= His Majesty's Hussar Life Guards Regiment =

His Majesty's Life Guards Hussar Regiment
- Лейб–гвардии Гусарский Его Величества полк
- Active: November 18, 1796 (1775) – 1918
- Country: Russian Empire
- Allegiance: Part of 2nd Guards Cavalry Division (Guards Corps, Petersburg Military District)
- Type: Hussar Regiment
- Garrison/HQ: Pavlovsk, Krasnoe Selo, Tsarskoe Selo (since 1815)
- Engagements: Russian–French Wars, including the Patriotic War of 1812, the Crimean War, the Russian–Turkish War of 1877–1878, the First World War

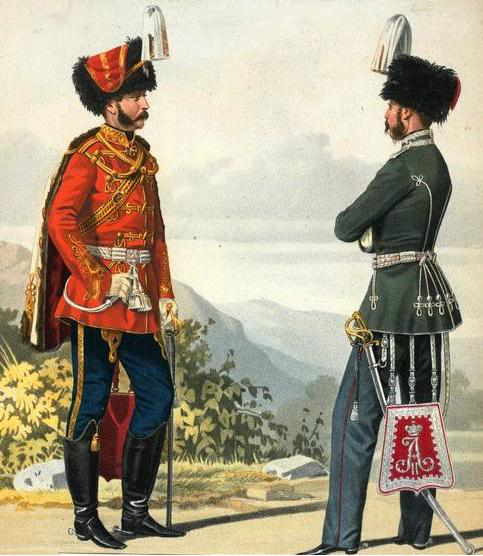
Karl Piratskiy. The Headquarters Officer of the Life Guards of Gusarsky and the Chief Officer of the Life Guards of the Grodno Hussars. 1858

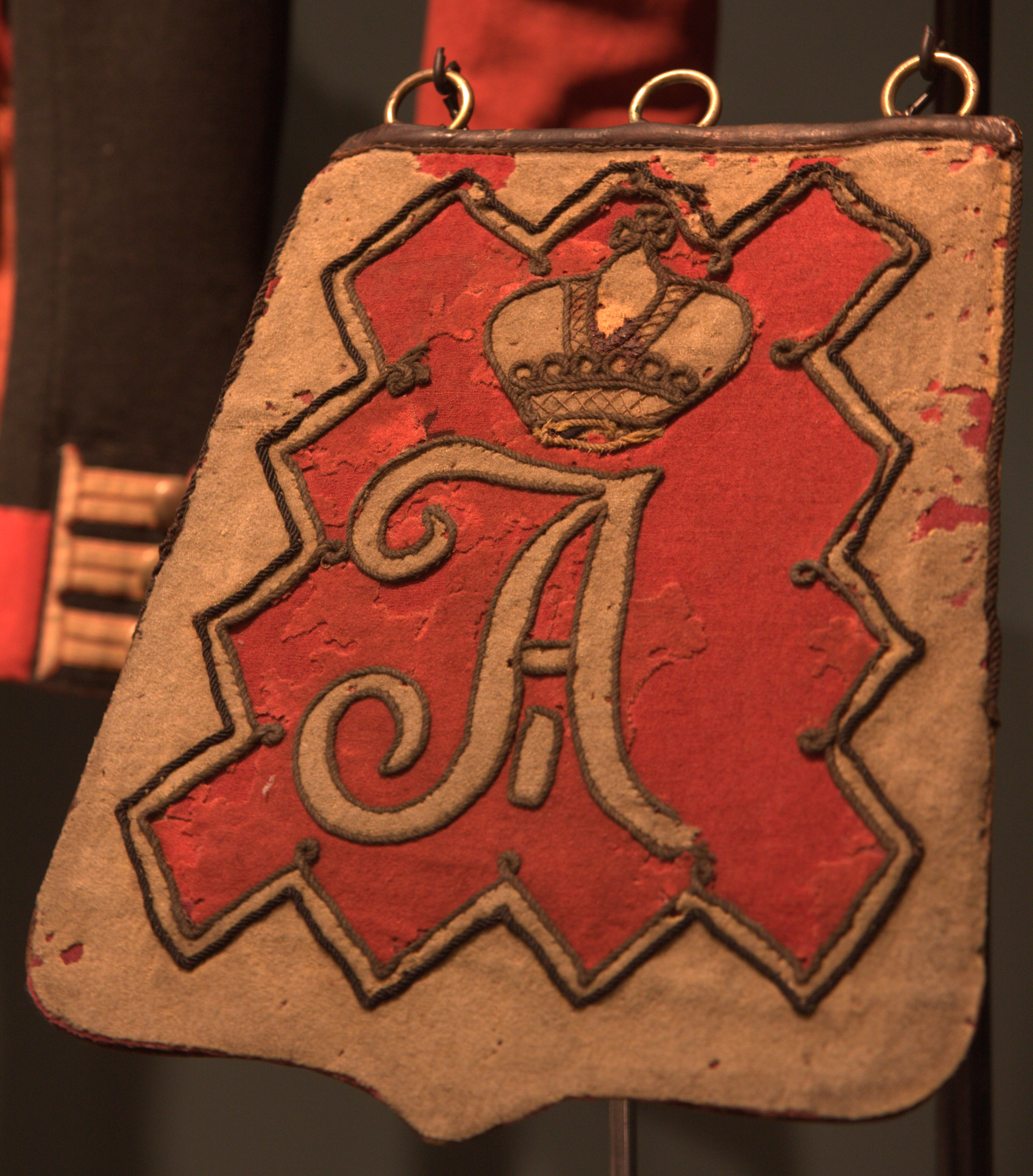
Tashka in the Life Guards Hussar Regiment, sample from 1802 to 1825, the monogram on the tashka changed due to the change of emperors

His Majesty's Life Guards Hussar Regiment (until 1855 – the Hussar Life Guards Regiment) was a Guards Hussar regiment of the Army of the Russian Empire.

== Organizational stages of the regiment's existence ==
At the end of 1774, Empress Catherine II ordered Prince Grigory Potemkin to form a hussar squadron of 130 people and two Cossack escort teams for service under Her Majesty; the squadron was named Leib Gusarsky, and the Cossack teams: one – Donskoy, the other – Chuguevskaya, and ordered to be at the highest court. In April 1775, the squadron was made up of Black (64 people), Yellow (25 people), Serbian (20 people), Moldavian (25 people), Wallachian (11 people) and Hungarian (two people) hussar regiments and was replenished with volunteers from the nobles, the best men of the army regiments and foreigners of beautiful appearance and tall stature. The contingent had to be made up of the best appearance and "living creatures", as well as honest and sober people. Throughout the reign of Catherine II, the squadron and escort teams carried the protection of Her Majesty.

On November 18, 1796, from the Life Hussar Squadron, the Cossack escort teams and the Hussar regiment and the Cossack squadron that were part of the Gatchina troops, a Consolidated Life Hussar Cossack Regiment was formed with the rights and advantages of the old guard. The regiment had 2 hussars and 2 cossack squadrons. On April 15, 1797, the 3rd Hussar Squadron was formed. On January 24, 1798, the Life Hussar Cossack Regiment was divided into 2 regiments: the hussar squadrons made up the Life Guards Hussar Regiment, and the Cossack ones – the Life Guards Cossack Regiment. On September 9, 1798, the Life Guards Hussar Regiment was reorganized into 2 battalions of 5 squadrons.

Upon the accession to the throne of Emperor Alexander I, the regiment was reorganized on December 29, 1802, into 5 squadrons and occupied the barracks in Krasnoe Selo and Pavlovsk. On January 6, 1813, the regiment was reorganized into 6 active and 1 reserve squadrons. Upon returning to Russia from a foreign campaign in 1814, the Life Hussars settled in Tsarskoe Selo, and the reserve squadron was abolished. On April 22, 1818, Grand Duke Alexander Nikolaevich (later Emperor Alexander II) was appointed chief of the Life Guards Hussar Regiment.

On April 6, 1836, the 7th Reserve Squadron was formed from the indefinite vacation of the lower ranks, and on January 25, 1842, it was ordered to have a frame for the 8th Reserve Squadron. In 1848, the 7th Reserve Squadron was named and the 8th Reserve Squadron was formed.

On February 19, 1855, on the occasion of the accession to the throne of Emperor Alexander II, who had been the chief of the regiment since 1818, the regiment was ordered to be called His Majesty's Life Guards Hussar Regiment. In 1856, His Majesty's Life Guards Hussar Regiment was assigned to 4 active and 1 reserve squadrons. On July 27, 1875, the reserve squadron was renamed.

During the reign of Emperor Alexander III, on August 6, 1883, the regiment was transferred to the 6–squadron, and the reserve squadron was reorganized into the Cadre Department of the Guards Cavalry Reserve.

On March 4, 1917, the regiment was renamed the Life Guards Hussar Regiment, and on May 8, 1918, it was disbanded.

During the Civil War, the regiment was revived in the Armed Forces of the South of Russia. Initially, the squadron of the regiment was part of the Consolidated Mountain Division. From December 30, 1919, the platoon and squadron of the regiment was included in the Consolidated Cavalry Brigade, from the beginning of January 1920 – in the Consolidated Guards Cavalry Regiment of the 1st Cavalry Division, and upon arrival in the Crimea from April 16, 1920, the Life Hussars formed a platoon of the Guards Cavalry Brigade. In the White Movement, the regiment lost 10 officers (two were shot, 7 killed and one died of disease).

In emigration, in France, a regimental association was created, which was part of the Russian General Military Union not directly, but only as a member of the Guards Association. In 1949–1951, the association numbered 26 people (including 18 in Paris and two in the United States), in 1958 – 21 people (including 13 in Paris), by 1962 – less than 10 people. Major General Dmitry Levshin and Major General Georgy Shevich were the chairmen of the association of the Life Guards Hussar Regiment.

== Participation in hostilities ==
=== Napoleonic Wars ===
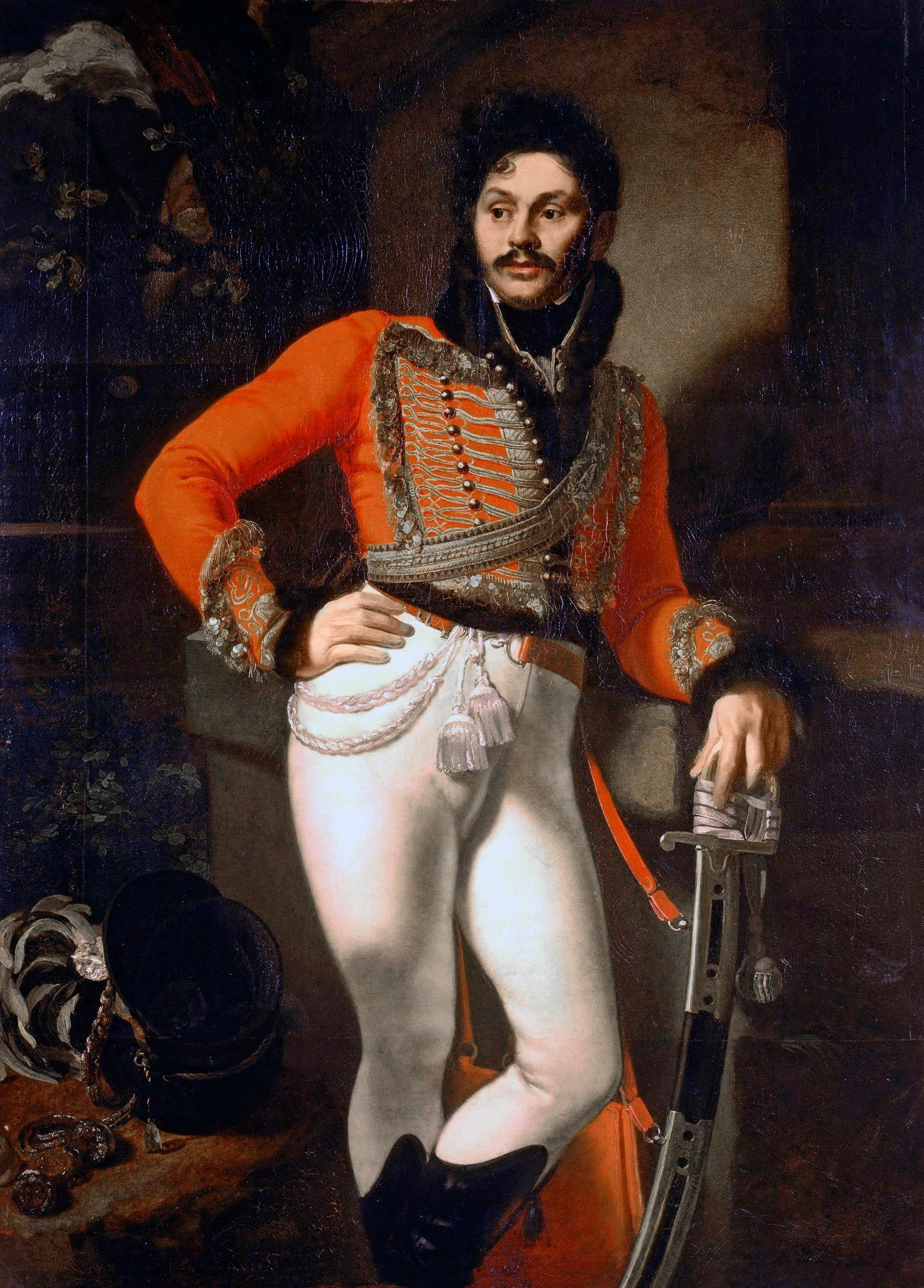
Evgraf Davydov, 1809. Colonel of the Life Guards Hussar Regiment

The regiment took part in the Napoleonic Wars. On June 2, 1807, the regiment distinguished itself near Friedland, where the Russian army, nevertheless, suffered one of the most crushing defeats.

In the history of the cavalry, the Friedland Battle is interesting because here, on a wide and level space in front of the city of Friedland, between the Sortlak and Domeraus Forests, a hand–to–hand fight of significant detachments of Russian and French cavalry took place (a total of 85 squadrons operated on the field). Moreover, the French army was represented by cuirassiers and dragoons, that is, heavy cavalry, and the Russian – by hussars, lancers and Cossacks, that is, light cavalry. In the course of a long battle, in which the infantry did not participate, the Russian horsemen prevailed, showing excellent training, courage and stamina.
...
Squadrons of the Life Guards of the Hussar Regiment took part in this cavalry battle: the Life Squadron under the command of Colonel Zagryazhsky, the squadron of Colonel Mandryka (commanded by Captain Troshchinsky) and the squadron of Colonel Tutolmin (commanded by Captain Selifontov). The Life Squadron especially distinguished itself: it attacked and overturned the enemy four times. During the oncoming attack of the division of General Latour–Mobourg, the squadron commander, Colonel Zagryazhsky, received several wounds and fell unconscious from his horse, then he was captured by the French dragoons who surrounded him. At this time, the captain Prince Abamelek immediately took command of the hussars left without a chief, encouraged his subordinates with personal fearlessness and rushed forward with them, stopped the enemy and, together with the staff captains Borozdin and Zabelin, took away three guns, which the French had previously captured from the Voronezh Musketeer Regiment.

Near Friedland, four Life Hussar officers were wounded: Colonel Zagryazhsky, Captain Troshchinsky (with a bullet in the leg), Lieutenant Korovkin (with a bullet in his left leg and a broadsword in his right arm) and Lieutenant Dekhanov, whose leg was blown off by a cannonball. The regiment lost 52 lower ranks and 88 combat horses killed. For the courage shown in battle, the Order of Saint George of the 4th Degree was received by Colonels Tutolmin and Zagryazhsky, captains Troshchinsky and Prince Abamelek, staff captains Prince Bagration and Count Saltykov.

On August 26, 1812, the regiment as part of the 1st Cavalry Corps of General Fyodor Uvarov distinguished itself in the Battle of Borodino.

At about twelve o'clock in the afternoon, Kutuzov ordered Uvarov's cavalry corps (28 squadrons, 12 mounted guns) to attack the left flank of the French. In the first line there were two regiments: Elisavetgrad Hussar and Life Guards Kazachy, in the second line: Life Guards Hussars, Life Guards Dragoons, Life Guards Ulansky and Nezhinsky Dragoons. The cavalry corps ford the Kolocha River near the village of Mal, attacked the cavalry division of General Ornano, overturned it and swiftly walked across the Voynu stream almost to the village of Borodino. Here the cavalrymen saw the division of General Delzon (four infantry regiments), which quickly formed into regimental squares.

All four squadrons of the Life Guards Hussar Regiment several times rushed into the attack against the infantry, but they failed to break through in the square. Horse artillery entered the action, and under its fire the 84th French Linear Regiment withdrew across the river, leaving one cannon to the hussars. Our horsemen could not go further than the village of Bezzubova and remained there until the evening.

In this combat episode, the officers of the Life Guards of the Hussar Regiment especially distinguished themselves: Colonel Troshchinsky (wounded by a bullet in the chest), Captain Andreevsky (wounded by buckshot), Captain Borozdin (seriously wounded by bullets, later died of wounds), Lieutenant Yushkov (wounded by a bullet in the chest), Staff Captain Dyakov 1st (shell–wounded). In addition, 2 non–commissioned officers, 1 trumpeter and 21 privates, 43 combat horses were killed.

=== Russian–Turkish Wars ===
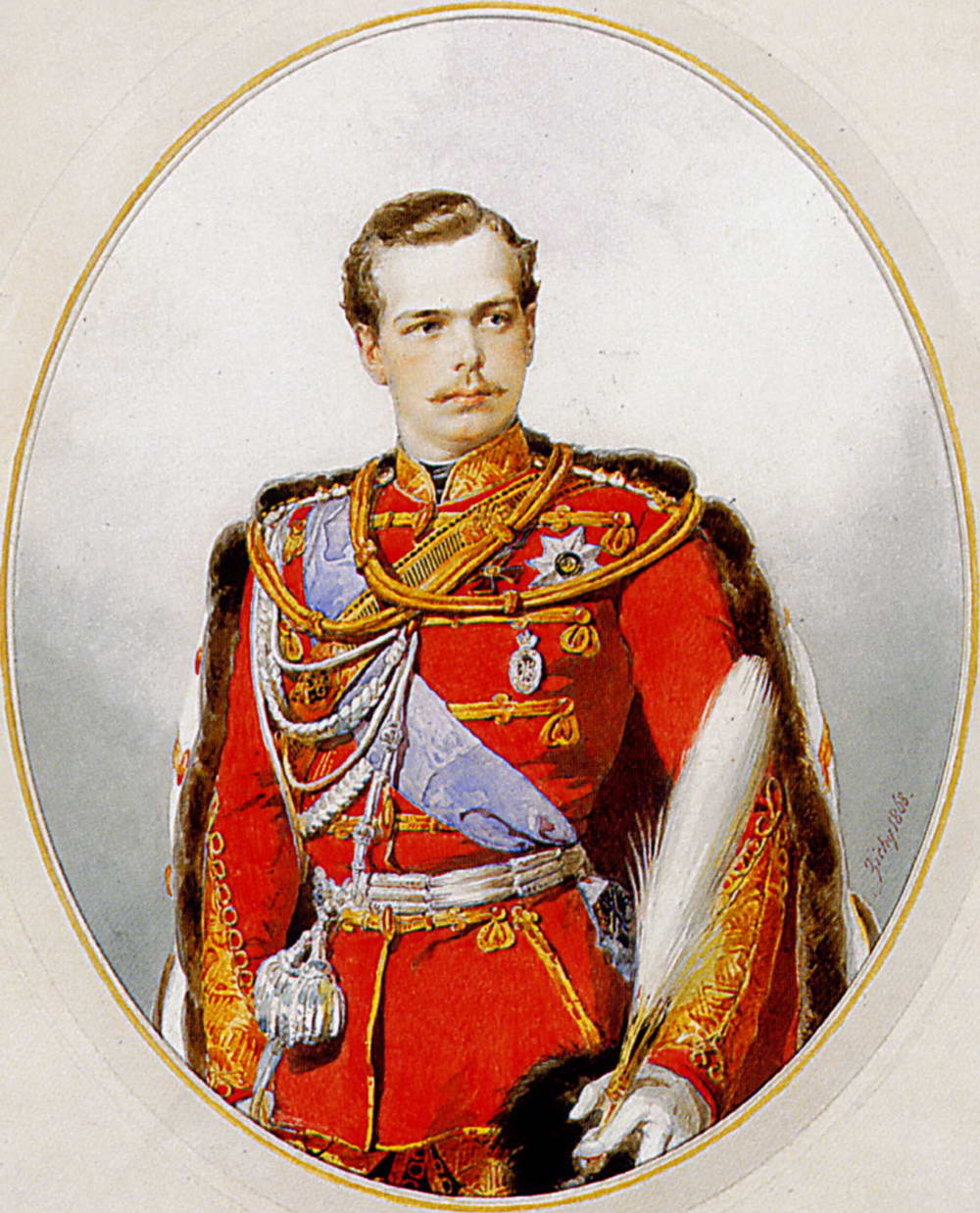
Portrait of the Heir Tsarevich Grand Duke Alexander Alexandrovich, Chief of the Life Guards Hussar Regiment, in the Uniform of the Regiment. 1868

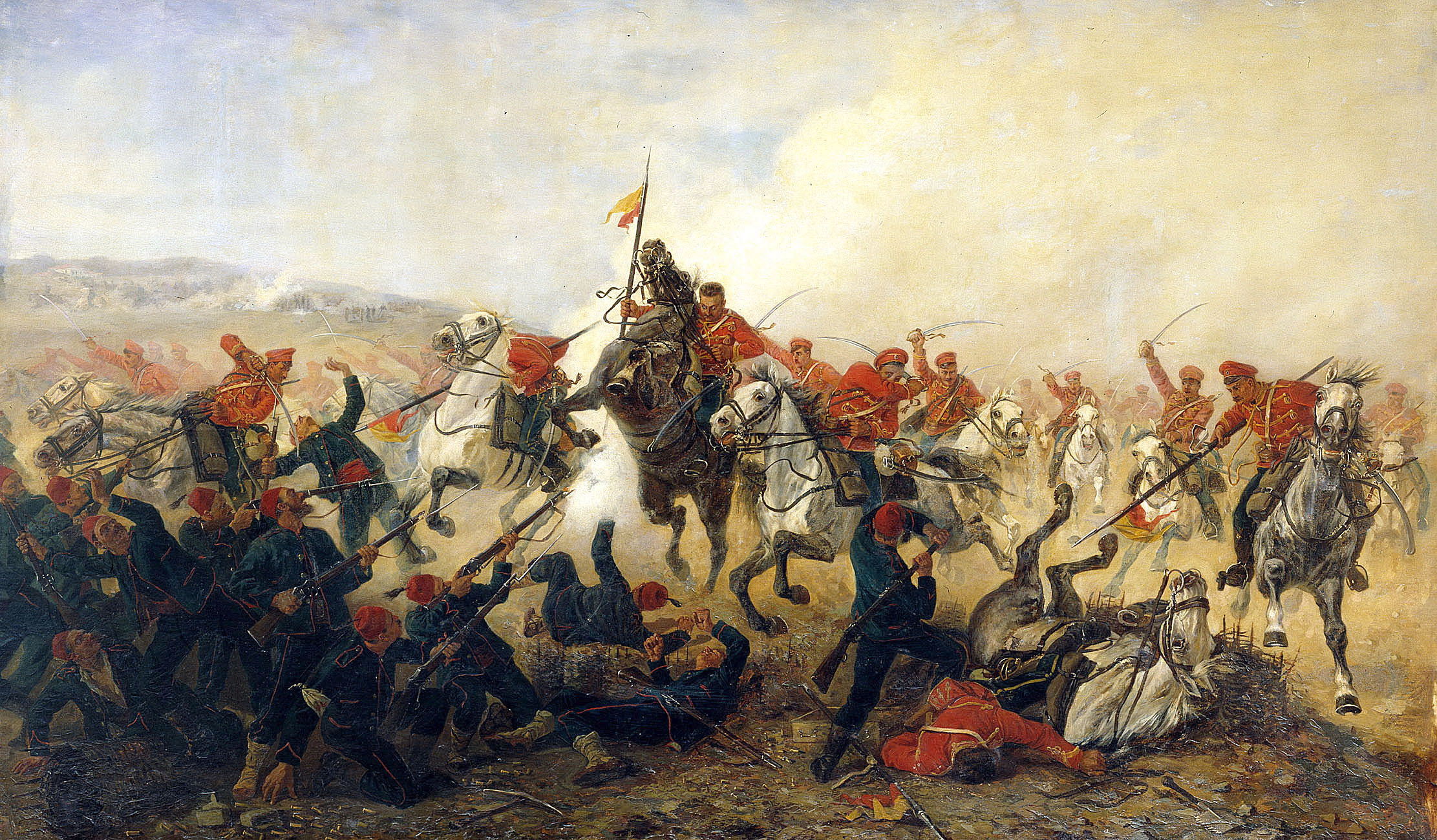
Attack of the Life Guards of the Hussar Regiment Near the Village of Telish, War of Independence, artist Viktor Mazurovsky

The regiment took part in the Russian–Turkish Wars.

- September 11–29, 1828 – participated in the siege of Varna;
- October 12–16, 1877 – battle near the village of Telish;
- January 2–5, 1878 – battles near Philippopolis.

The first successes of the Russian Army, crossing the Danube, the capture of the cities of Nikopol and Tyrnov, but defeats occurred on our right flank when Osman Pasha moved from the city of Viddin to Plevna and fell on the Russian troops. Before the arrival of reinforcements, the Russian Army went on the defensive, and on July 22, 1877, the mobilization of a part of the Guard was announced, including the 2nd Guards Cavalry Division, which included His Majesty's Life Guards Hussar Regiment.

The troops were sent in echelons by rail to the Zhmerynka Station, where the gathering point for arriving reinforcements was located. Arriving on August 20 at the Romanian border, the entire division lined up for a review carried out by the Chief of the Division, Major General Gurko.

On August 24, General Gurko, at the head of his division, crossed the Prut River into Turkish territory and followed forced marches to the Danube River.

Passing Rymnik and Focsani, recalling the glorious campaigns of the times of Suvorov and Dibich, passing through Bucharest, the regiment arrived at Yaimnitsa on the banks of the Danube on September 11.

Crossing the Danube, the Russian Army headed through Bulgaria and on September 17, the Division stopped at Gorny–Studna, where the main apartment of the Sovereign Emperor was, who inspected the arriving troops.

The current Russian Army under the High Command of Grand Duke Nikolai Nikolaevich the Elder, was divided into three detachments: the eastern one was under the command of the Heir to the Tsarevich, the southern one was commanded by General Radetzky, the western one was commanded by Prince, later King, Carol I of Romania, with an assistant General Adjutant Totleben.

The Turkish army was divided into three groups: Suleiman Pasha was in the Balkans in the south, Abdul Kerim Pasha was in the east – Ruschuk direction, and Osman Pasha in the west. The Russians had to fight in the fall and winter with difficult transportation. To cut off the supply of the Turkish army, it was necessary to cut off the Sofia Highway and overlay the city of Plevna. Osman Pasha was in Plevna with his troops.

The division marched in the indicated direction in brigade, behind the Life Guards Hussar regiment was the glorious 5th Battery, then the Life Dragoons followed. When they reached Dolyen Lipnice, everyone stopped there until October 6. At that time, General Gurko was appointed commander of all cavalry, controlling access to Plevna.

Moving towards Plevna, the movement slowed down. The regiment met the 3rd Guards Infantry Division. Narrow trails, ravines, and forests delayed progress. On the approaches closer to Plevna, the regiment again entered the command of Adjutant General Gurko. In this area, in addition to the besieged Plevna, there were fortified places: Gorny Dubnyak, Dolny Dubnyak and Telish, surrounded by redoubts and fortifications. Those had to be taken for further advancement.

There were large Turkish forces in this area, and Osman Pasha with 35 thousand troops. Against them were troops under the command of General Gurko – cavalry, and under the command of General Skobelev – Russian infantry. On October 10, a large reconnaissance was carried out between Telish and Dolny Dubnyak. On October 12, an order was given to the troops to move to the Plevno–Sofiyskoye Highway, take positions and Gorny Dubnyak and close the enemy blockade in Plevna. 2nd Brigade, 2nd Guards Cavalry Division, Life Guards Jaeger Regiment, our batteries and a hundred Cossacks – to advance and attack a position near the village of Telish.

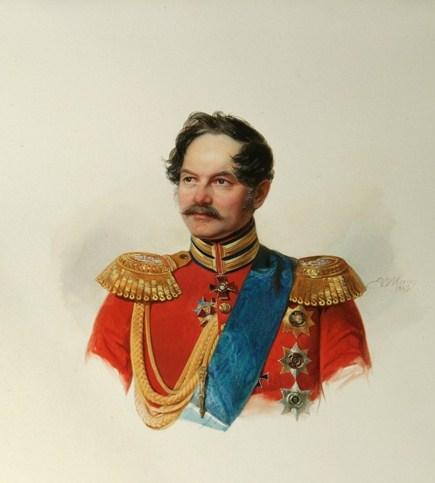
Baron Yegor Meyendorf (1794–1879)

At that time, His Majesty's Life Guards Hussar Regiment was commanded directly by the Adjutant Wing Baron Meyendorf. The division chief ordered our brigade and the 5th Horse Guards Battery to follow under the general command of the adjutant wing of Baron Meyendorff to the assembly point and, joining with the rangers, enter the adjutant wing of Colonel Chelishchev under the general command of their commander.

At midnight the river Vid was ford and at three o'clock in the morning the regiment approached Telish. According to the order of General Gurko, the Life Jägers were ordered to attack Telish head–on, the Life Hussars with 4 mounted guns – to reveal the enemy's forces and act on its right flank, covering and supporting the left flank of the Jägers, the Life Dragoons with 2 guns to occupy the Rakitnaya Hill and guard the rear and flank of the entire detachment in the event of a detour.

Hussars with 4 guns under the command of Baron Meyendorff went at full trot to Telish. There were huge corn fields three miles away, the Turks were firing hard, the Jaegers were moving forward, the 5th Battery opened fire.

The Life Dragoons headed for Rakitnaya Heights. The Jägers advanced intensively, the Life Hussars broke through the first chain and pursued the Turks, but then, under heavy gunfire, they returned. At eight o'clock, the Jägers went out into the corn field, but despite miracles of courage, they suffered heavy losses.

The 5th Battery and the Life Hussars attacked the Turks and put them to flight, but at 2 o'clock in the afternoon, according to the order, a general retreat was made. The Jägers with the banners returned back, but on October 12 Telish could not be taken.

Gorny Dubnyak was taken on October 13 by the Pavlovites, and the Turkish line Plevna–Sofia was cut. Many prisoners were taken, the Turkish convoys began to retreat, and the guns of the 5th Battery and the Life Hussars covered the retreat of the rangers with their swift attacks. The dragoons knocked down and forced the Turks to retreat at the Rakit Height. The Jaegers' banners were greeted by the trumpeters of the Life Dragoons and the Life Hussars, and the brigade commander Baron Meyendorff commanded "Attention, sabers out, gentlemen officers".

From October 13 to 15, the Turks strengthened Telish. The Leib Jägers were healing their wounds, but on October 16 the second battle for Telish began. Leib Lancers became the front to Telish on the left, and Horse Grenadiers on the right. The lancers attacked with their quarry, but, showered with bullets, they calmly and orderly retreated. Russian artillery fired at the enemy all the time, Sheiket's bashi–bazouks went to Telish's rescue, but after the attack they began to quickly retreat. Soon a white flag was raised over Telish. The life–hussars then set out on the fleeing, and all the units, having successfully completed this operation on the 16th, united on a bivouac in the village of Svinar. During these days of the battle, Osman Pasha lost more than 5,000 people, and the supply of his army was cut and stopped.

After the fall of the specified fortified area, the command decided to besiege Plevna, and send other units through the Balkans.

On October 24, the Tsar traveled around the Guards regiments near the Plevna and thanked them for the glorious deed near Telish. The Life Guards Hussar Regiment of His Majesty, received Badges for hats with the inscription: "For Telish – October 12, 1877".

On October 26, news was received that part of the troops, including the 2nd Guards Cavalry Division, were going to the Balkans. Horse Grenadiers occupied the city of Vratsa, on November 3, the Life Hussars and the 5th Battery celebrated a holiday in the village of Yablanitsa, from where congratulations were sent to the Life Jägers.

The regiment began to enter the foothills of heights and strongholds covered with snow and ice. From Yablunytsy, Life Lancers and Life Hussars with the 5th Guards Horse Battery, as part of the main forces under the command of Count Shuvalov, made the 1st transition to the city of Etropole. On November 19 we stood in Orhaniye, where steep ascents began, on November 29 we all learned about the fall of Plevna, and the Trans–Balkan Campaign began for everyone.

The ascent from the city of Vrachesh was very difficult, there was a severe frost and blizzards began, mountains and forests all around. Horses glided along the narrow paths, many fell into the gorges, people often had to bask in the fires.

Having passed the Arabakonak position of the Turks, the city of Umurgach, after which a steep descent began, sometimes even more difficult, whose past ascents. Arriving in Zhelyava, the division found itself in the rich Sofia Valley and attacked the fortified village of Tashkisen. On December 20, the cavalry was sent from Komartsovo to Petrichevo, and the Turks retreated to the village of Smolskoye. Christmas was celebrated in the village of Rakovitsa.

The passage through the small Balkans began: in three columns from Sofia to the Philippopolis Highway, to Butovo and Mechka, to the valley of the Maritsa River. In front of each column was the 1st Brigade of the Guards Cavalry, the 2nd was in the middle column along with the artillery. His Majesty's Life Guards Hussar Regiment passed through Priobren.

January 1, 1878 – the valley of the Maritsa River. The village of Kurukney was cleared of the Turks by the Hussars, and soon we saw the city of Philippopolis three miles away. The 2nd Squadron completely captured the enemy's convoy in the village of Stroyevo, and then, reaching the Karlovskoe Highway, on January 3 they moved to Philippopolis and at night they occupied part of the city.

On January 9, the cavalry began to overtake the infantry of General Skobelev and on the 11th approached Adrianople. General Dokhturov, chief of the cavalry vanguard, met our division at the entrance to this city. On January 14, the Life Hussars stopped in the city of Rodosto, on the Sea of Marmara.

On January 22, the news of the armistice was received, but most of the troops had to remain for almost seven months on the shores of the Sea of Marmara, and only the sick were allowed to be sent back to Russia. There were trainings, reviews, and only on August 2, the units began to be loaded onto steamers to leave for their homeland.

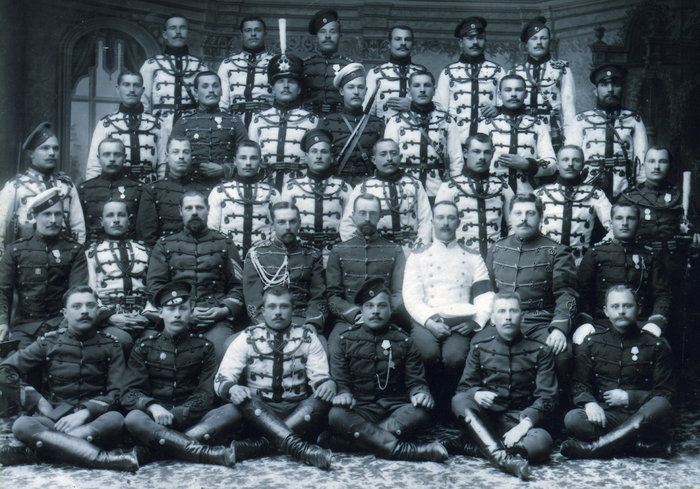
His Majesty's Life Guards Hussar Regiment, 2nd Squadron (1895), Tsarskoe Selo

=== Polish Campaign ===
The regiment took part in the Polish Campaign.

- May 5, 1831 – a battle near the village of Sokolovo;
- August 25–26, 1831 – the assault on Warsaw.

=== Japanese War of 1905 ===
The regiment took part in the Japanese War of 1905. During the war in the Far East, separate corps and divisions were sent there to replenish the Manzhurian Armies. The Guard, like most of the army corps in European Russia, remained in a peaceful position.

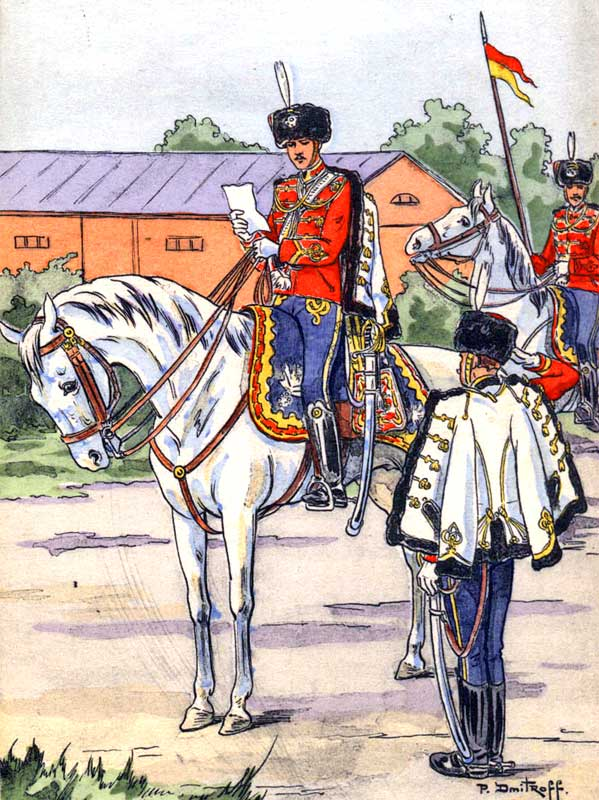
Full dress uniform of His Majesty's Life Guards Hussar Regiment in 1914

Many officers of the Life Guards of His Majesty's Hussar Regiment were transferred to the Active Army at their own request:

1. Colonel Plautin – commander of the Terek Kuban Horse Regiment;
2. Captain Narkozov – in the 2nd Verkhneudinsky Regiment;
3. Lieutenant Count Zelepolsky – in the Siberian Cossack Host;
4. Lieutenant Friederice – in the 1st Nerchinsk Cossack Regiment;
5. Cornet Naryshkin – to the Nerchinsk Cossack Regiment;
6. Cornet Count Stenbock–Fermor – to the Primorsky Dragoon Regiment;
7. Cornet Grevs – to the Tersko–Kuban Horse Regiment;
8. Cornet Roop – in the 1st Nerchinsk Cossack Regiment;
9. Cornet Count Tolstoy – in the Terek–Kuban Cavalry Regiment;
10. Cornet Prince Masalsky – in the Terek–Kuban Cavalry Regiment;
11. Cornet Raevsky – to the Chernigov Dragoon Regiment;
12. Cornet Greve – in the Terek–Kuban Cavalry Regiment;
13. Cornet Count Bennigsen – in the fleet;
14. Cornet Smetskoy – went with a machine–gun team;
15. Cornet Skaloy – from the reserve to the East Siberian Rifle Regiment.

He received the Order of Saint George, 4th Degree, for the fact that, when all the officers were killed, he continued to lead the successful firing of the battery.

=== World War I ===
The regiment took part in the First World War. The regiment as part of the 2nd Guards Cavalry Division was sent to the North–Western Front. Participated in the East Prussian, Lodz and Sein operations. It acted in the Lublin–Kholmsk Battle in July 1915. He operated on the Bug River, in particular, covering the withdrawal of the 13th Army.

== Appearance ==
The lower ranks of the regiment were staffed from well–built brown–haired men (His Majesty's Squadron of light–bearded). The colors of the horses differed by squadron: 1st, 2nd and 3rd Squadrons – gray color with a transition from dark gray to lighter ones, 2nd Squadron – bay with marks, 4th Squadron – white, 5th and 6th Squadrons – gray with a transition from light gray to darker.

== Uniform and weapon changes ==
Konstantin Manzey. "Drawings to the History of the Life Guards of His Majesty's Hussar Regiment", 1859
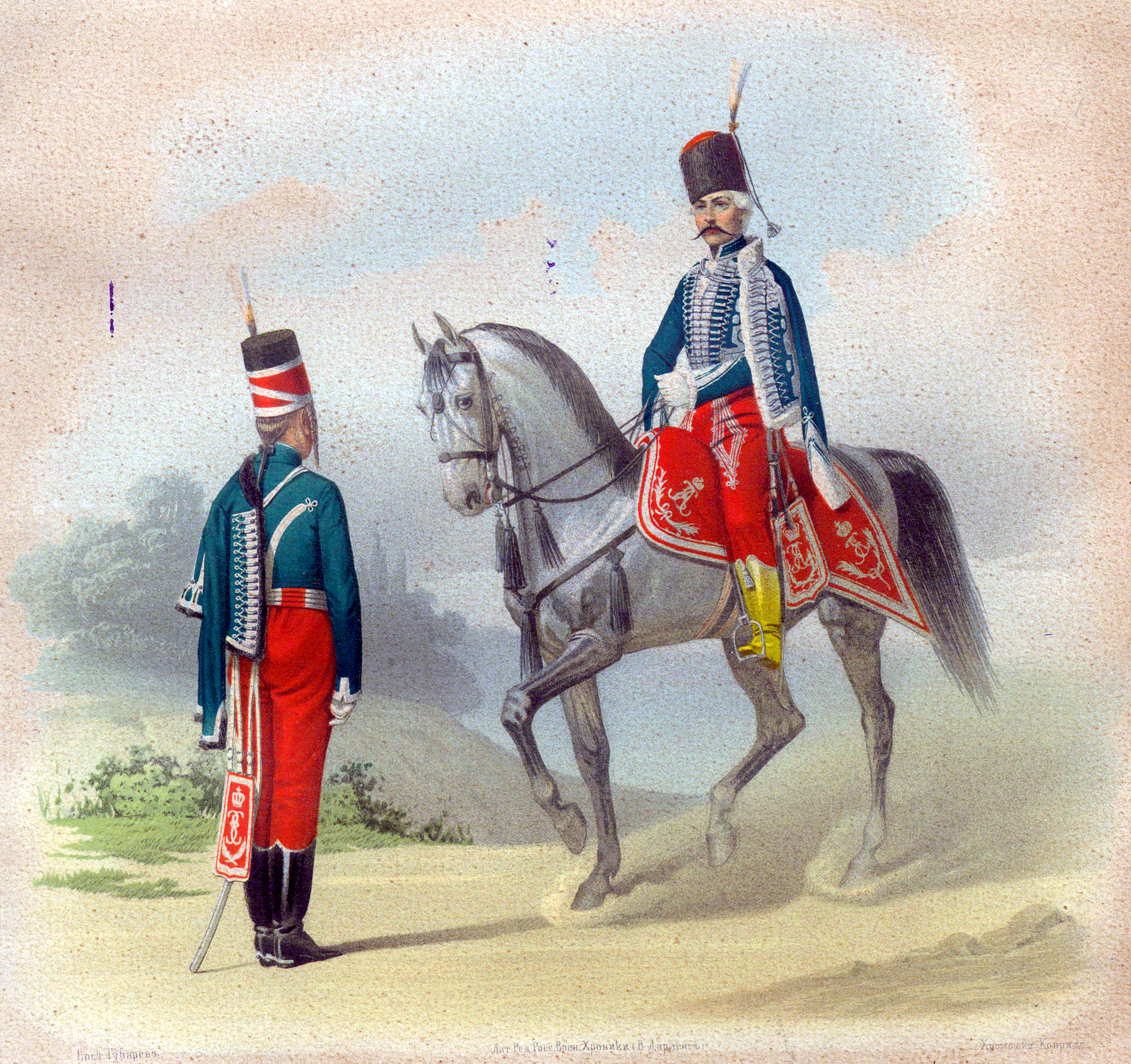
Chief Officer in full dress and Private in everyday uniform (1775–1795)

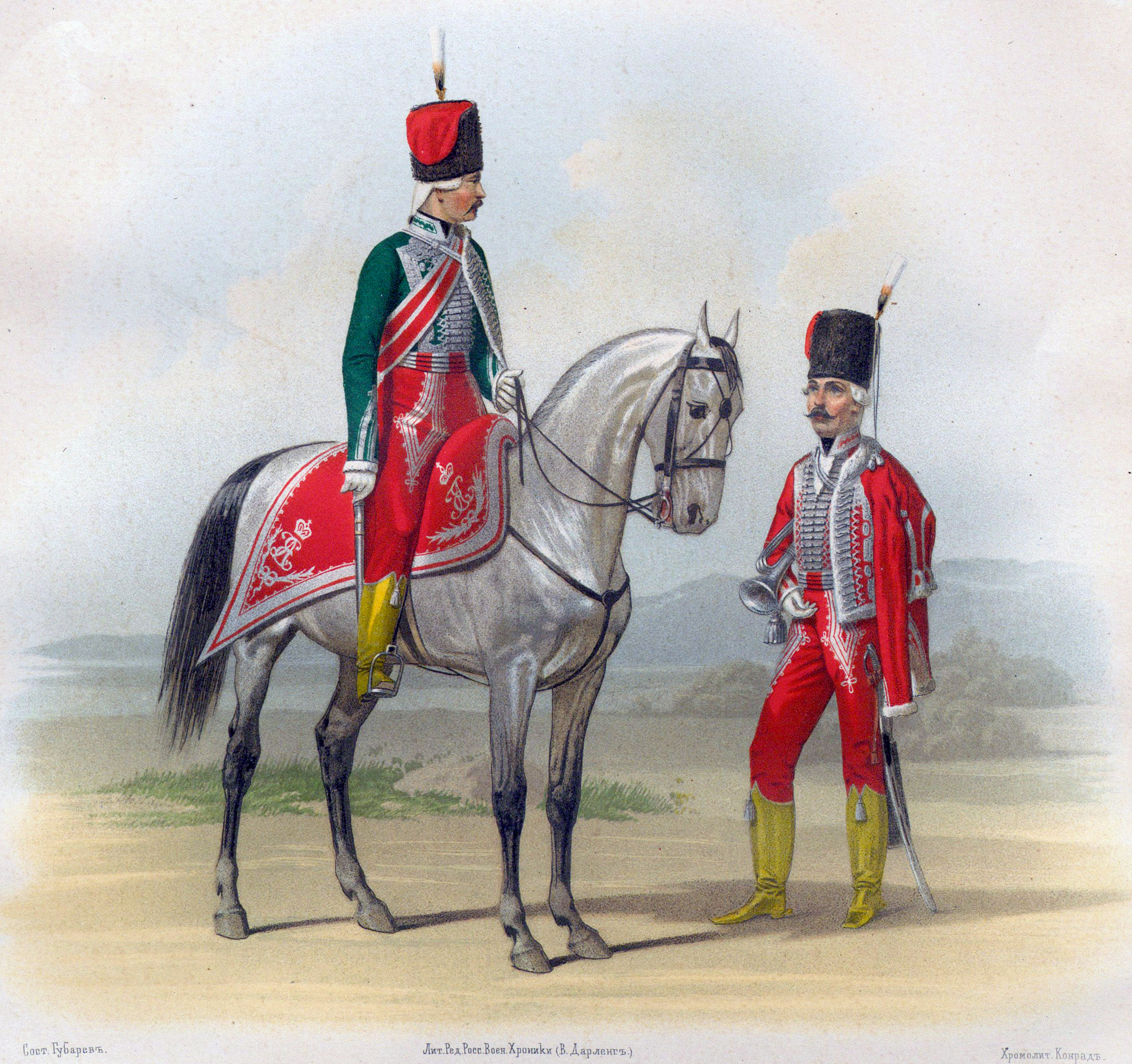
Private and Trumpeter in full dress (1775–1795)

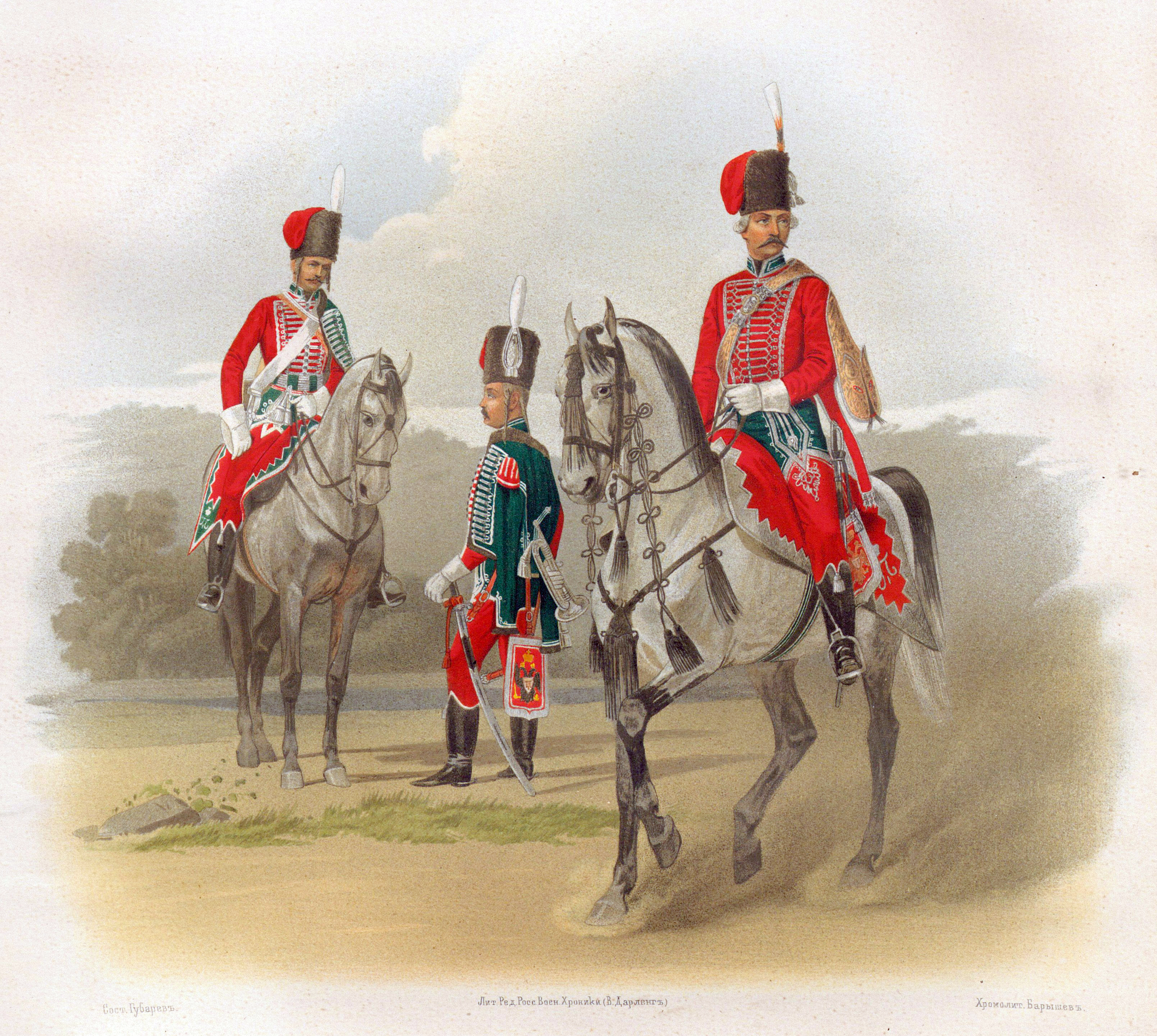
Chief Officer, Private and Trumpeter in full dress (1796–1799)

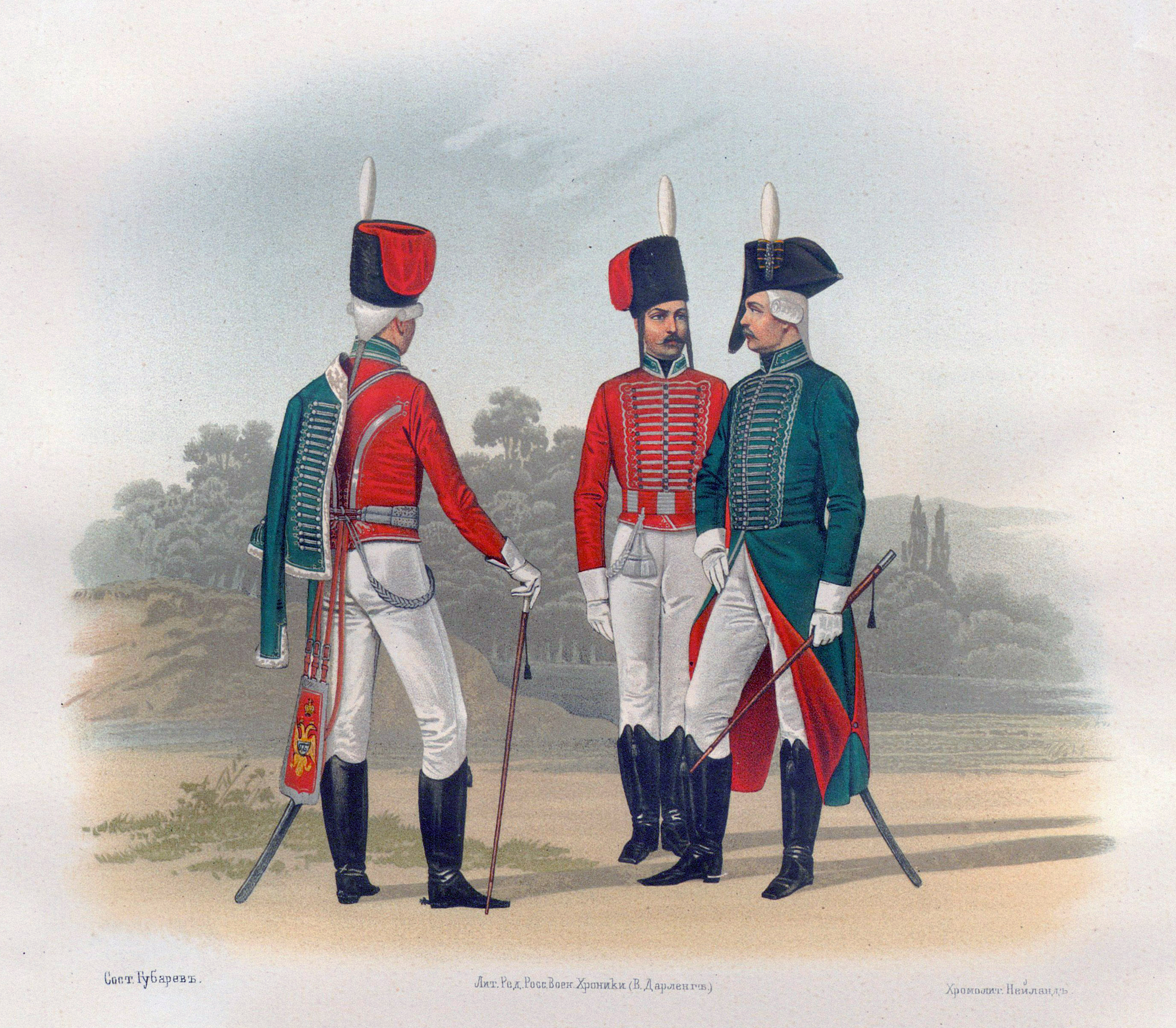
Chief Officer and Private Chief Officer in Hungarian (1796–1799)

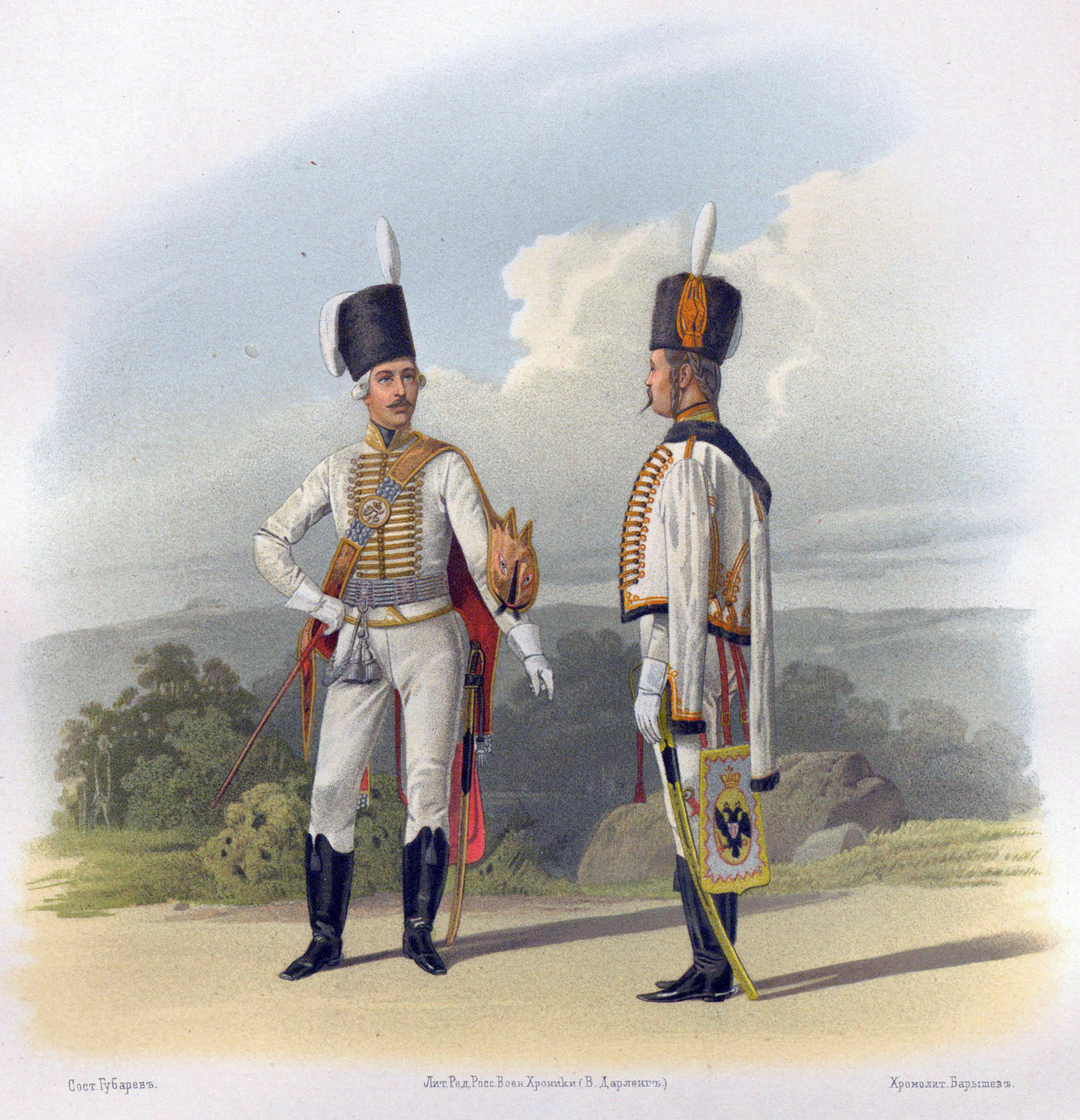
Chief Officer and Private in full dress (1799)

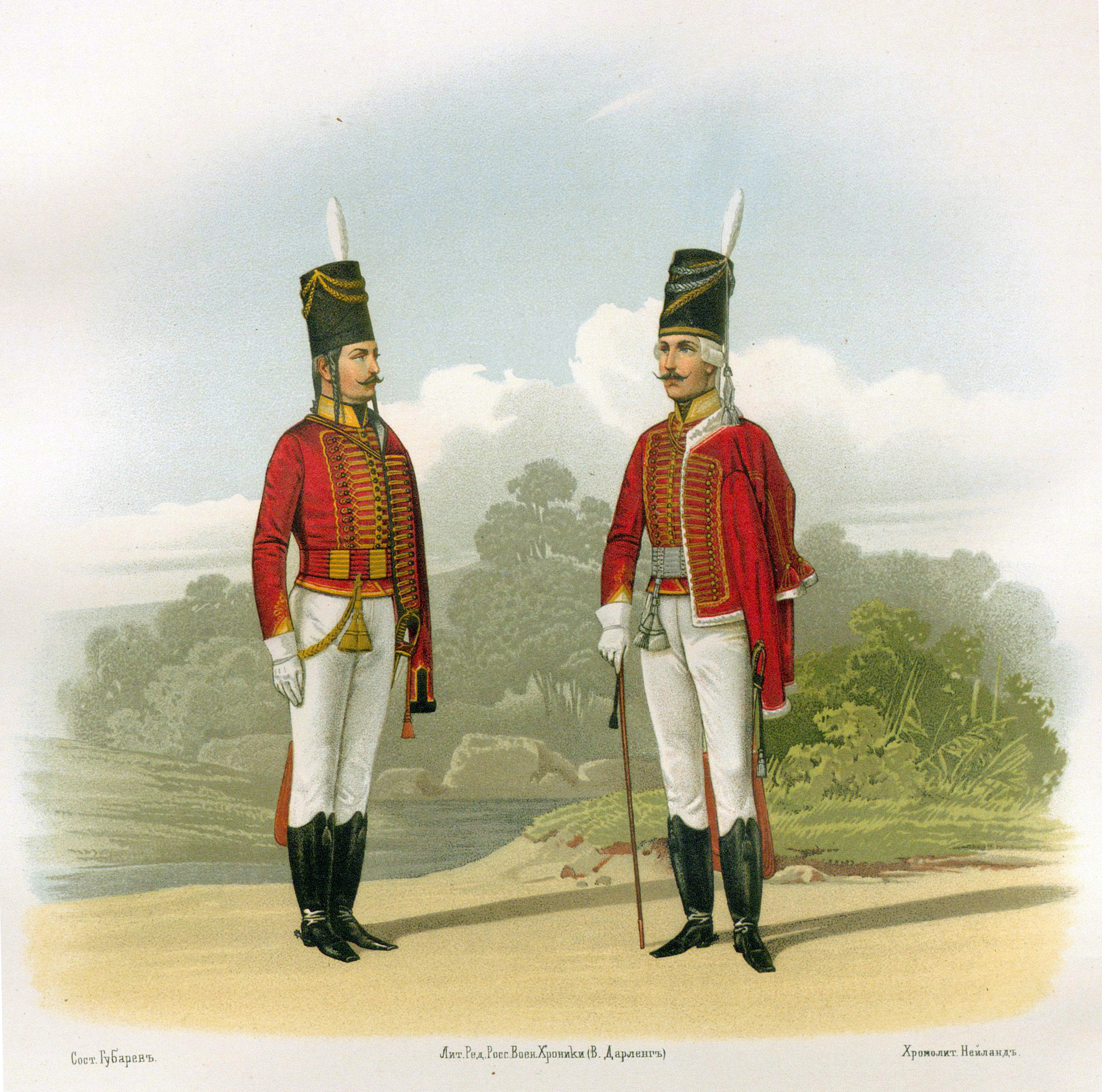
Chief Officer and Private in full dress (1799–1801)

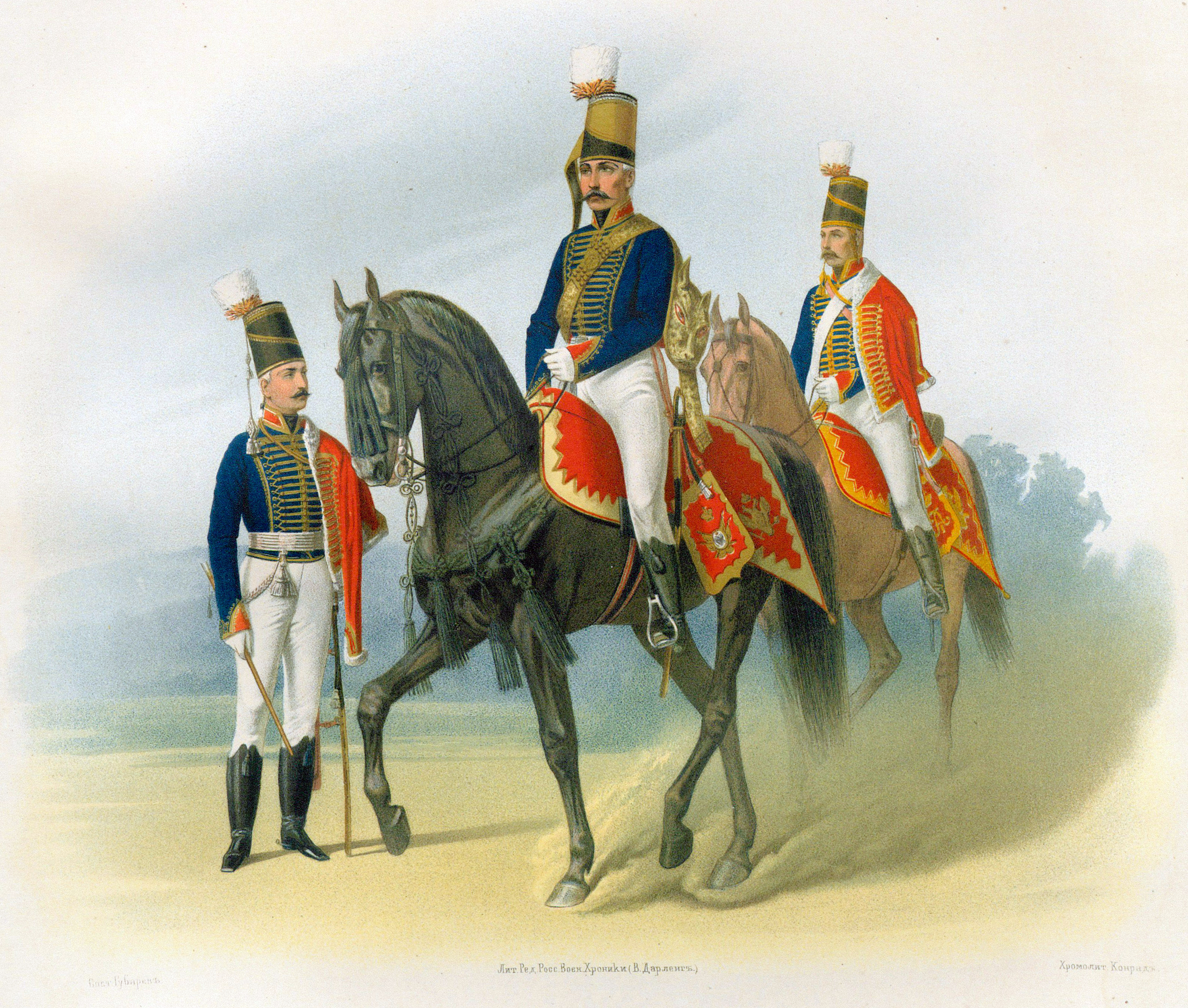
Chief Officer in full dress and Private Chief Officer in everyday uniform (1801–1803)

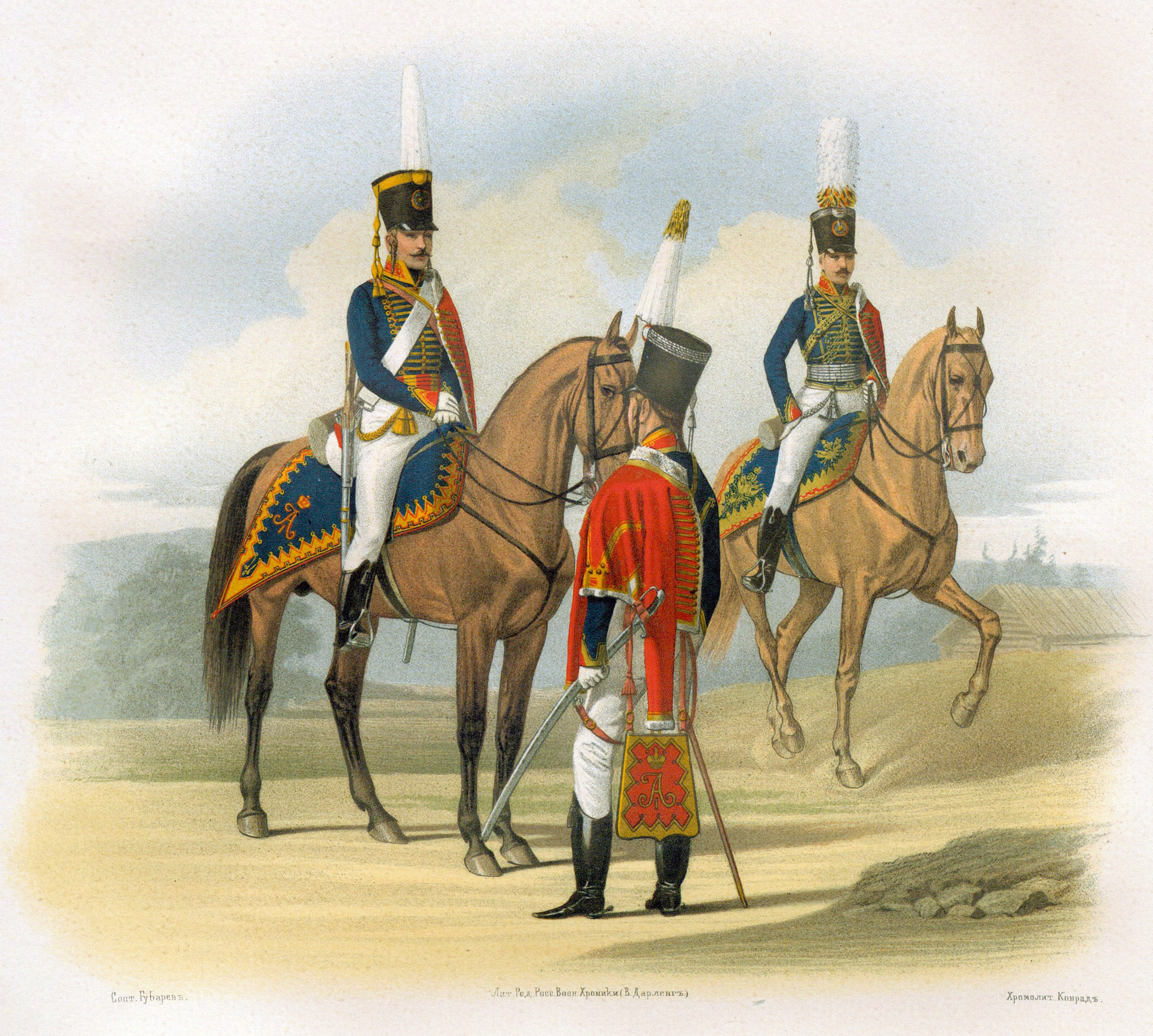
Chief Officer, Non–Commissioned Officer and Private in full dress (1803–1809)

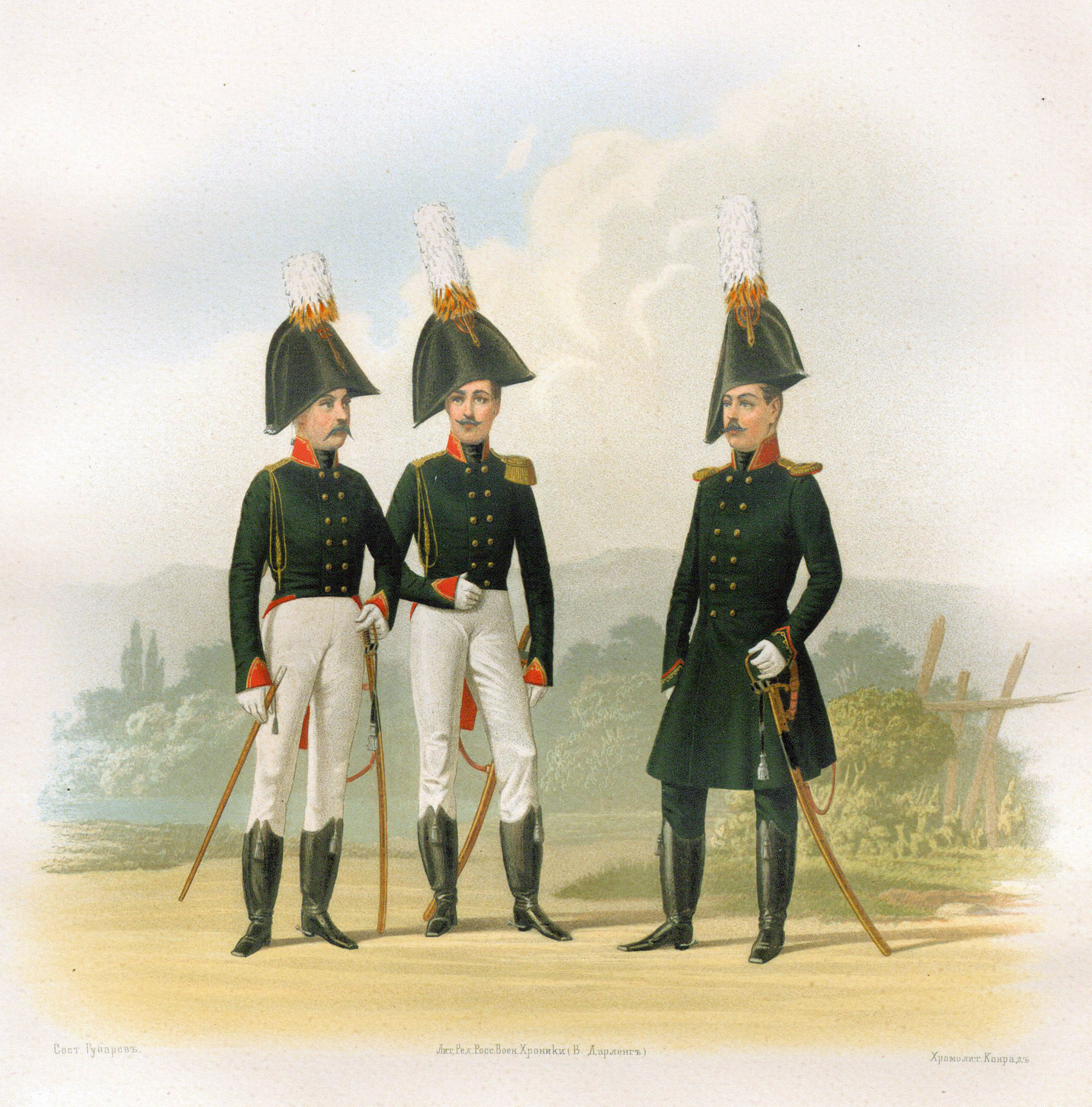
Headquarters and Chief Officer in vice uniforms (1801–1807–1809), Chief Officer in frock coat (1809–1812)

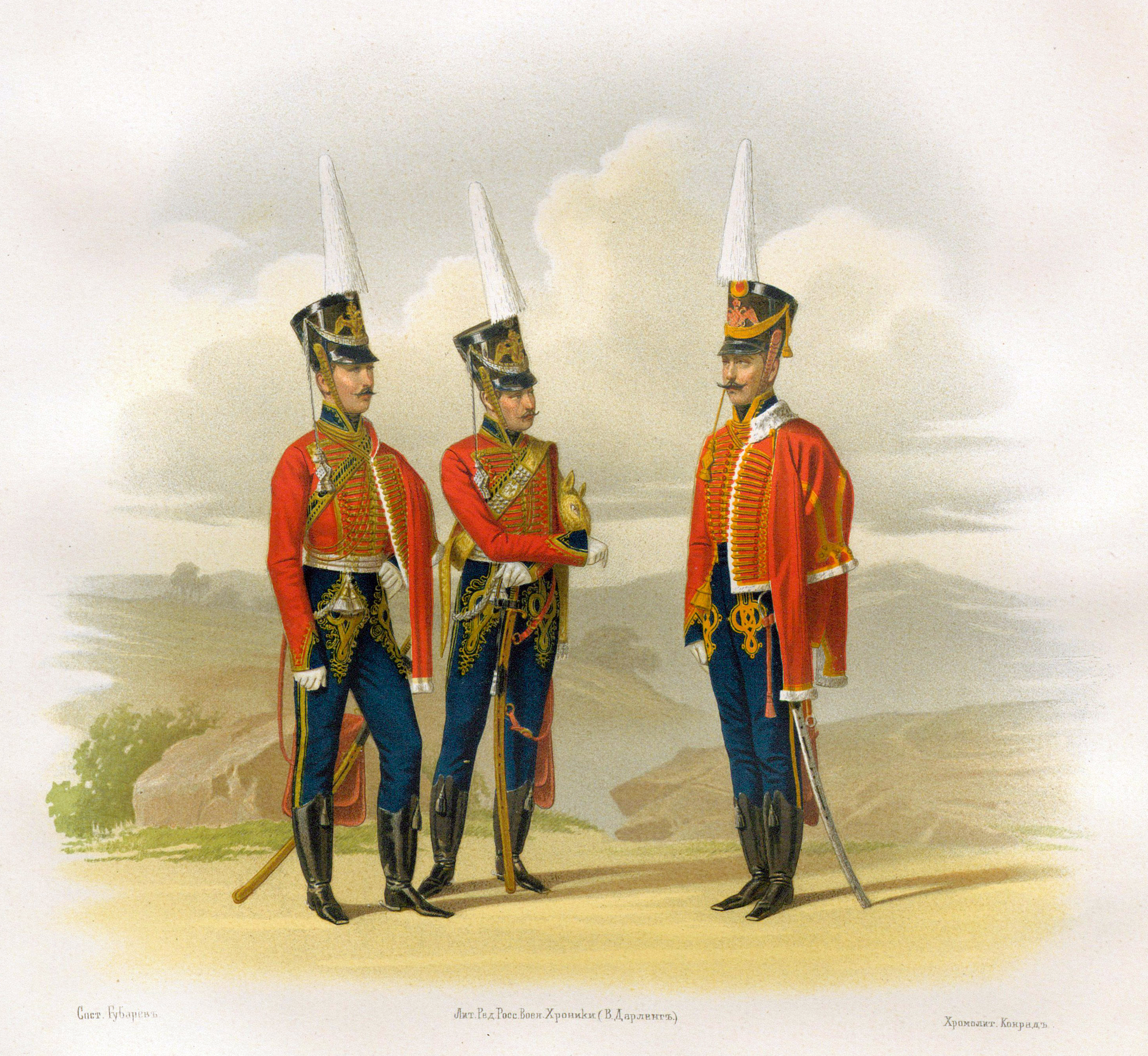
Chief Officers and Private in full dress (1809–1812)

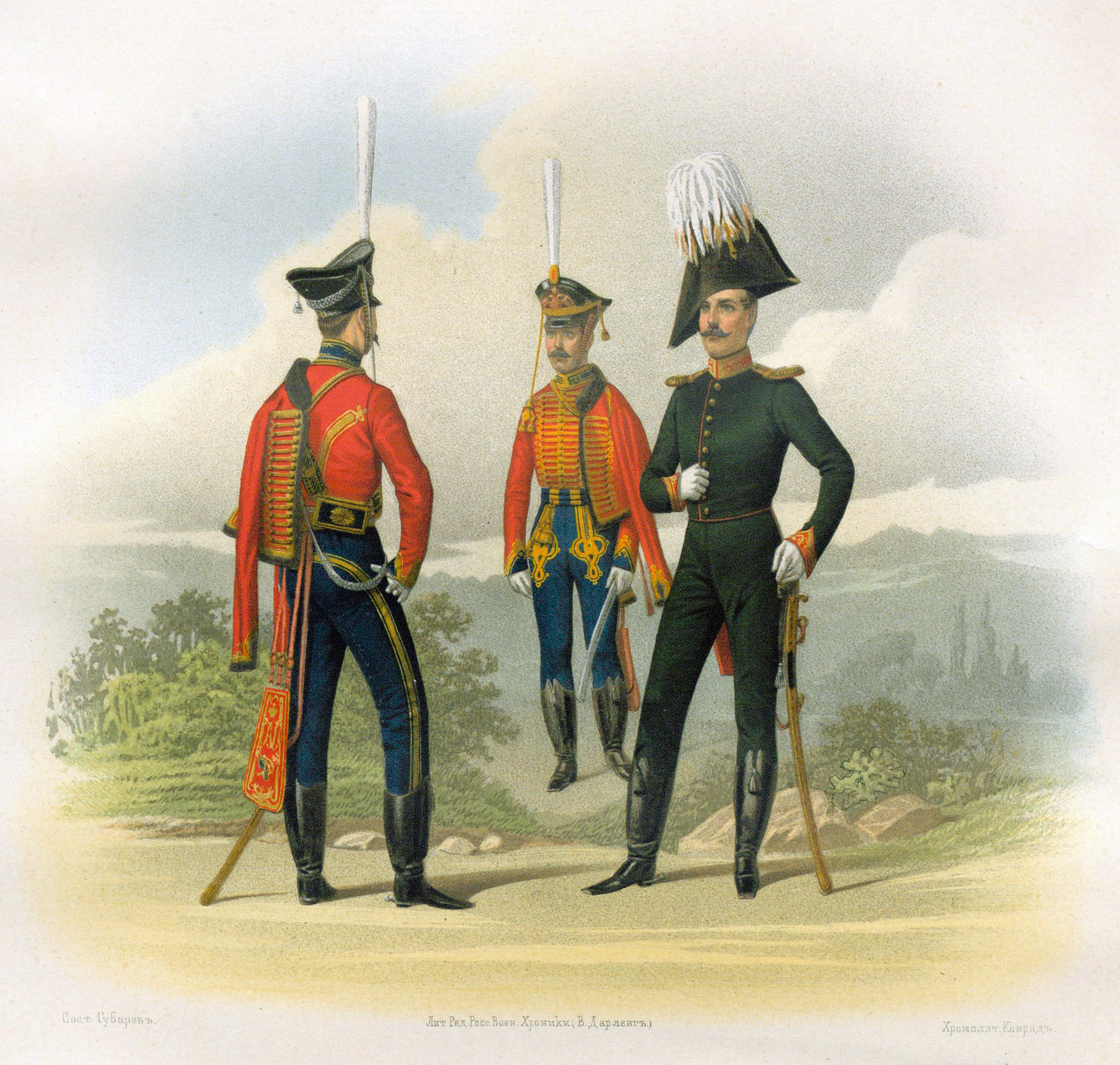
Chief Officer, Private in full dress (1812–1819), Chief Officer in vice uniform (1814–1819)

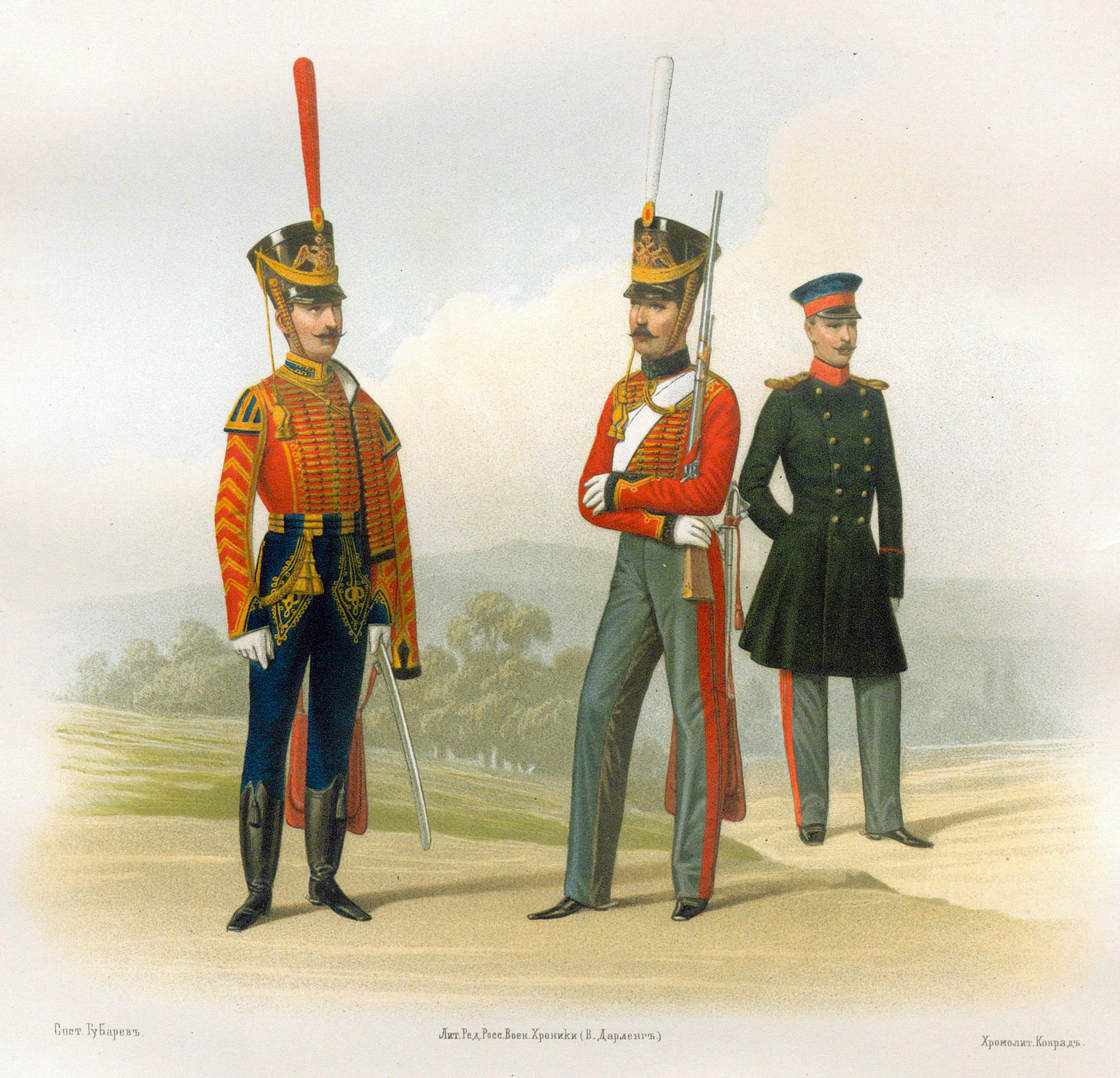
Trumpeter and Private in full dress and marching uniform (1817–1819), Chief Officer in a frock coat (1814–1818)

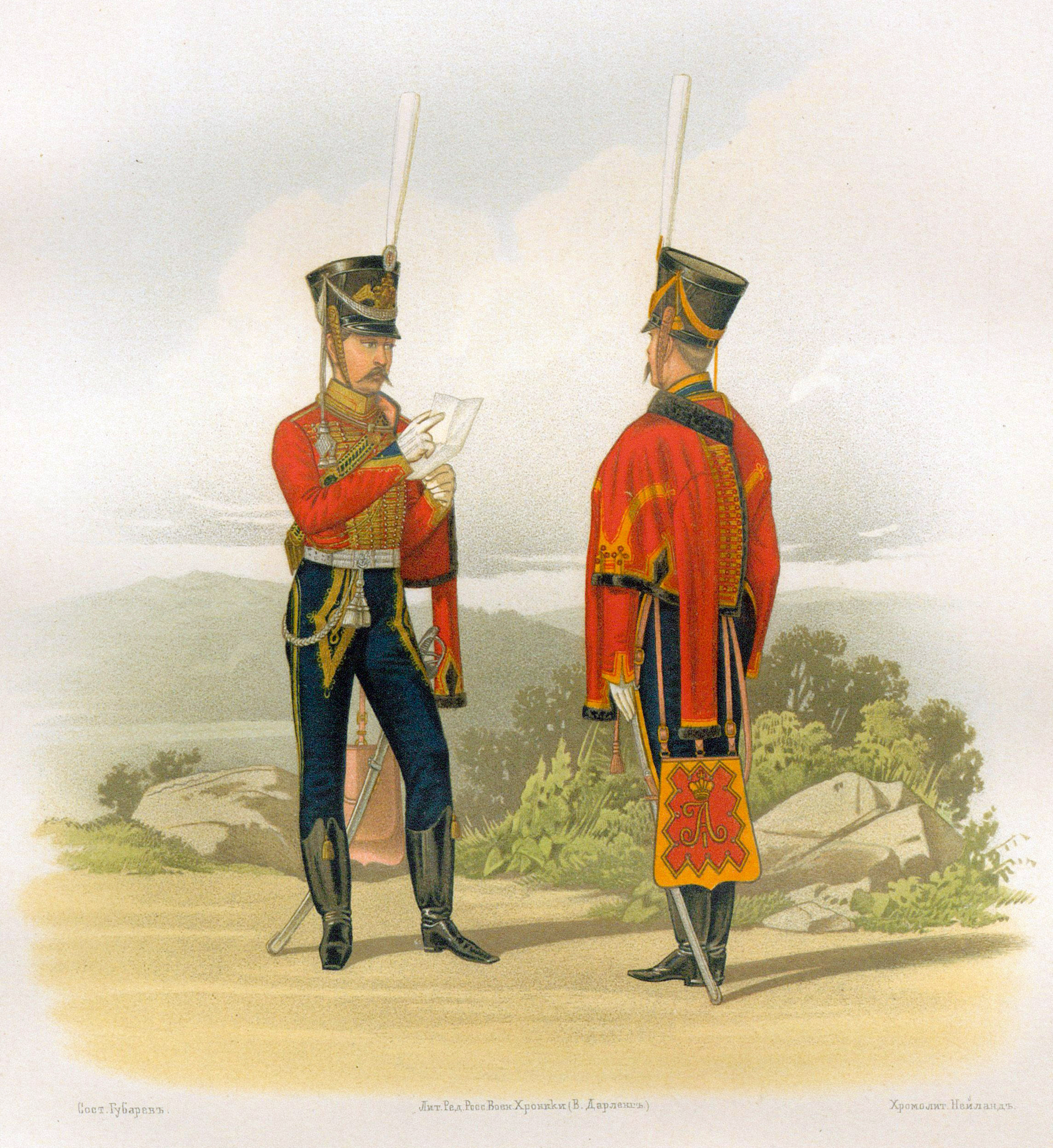
Chief Officer and Private in full dress (1816–1819)

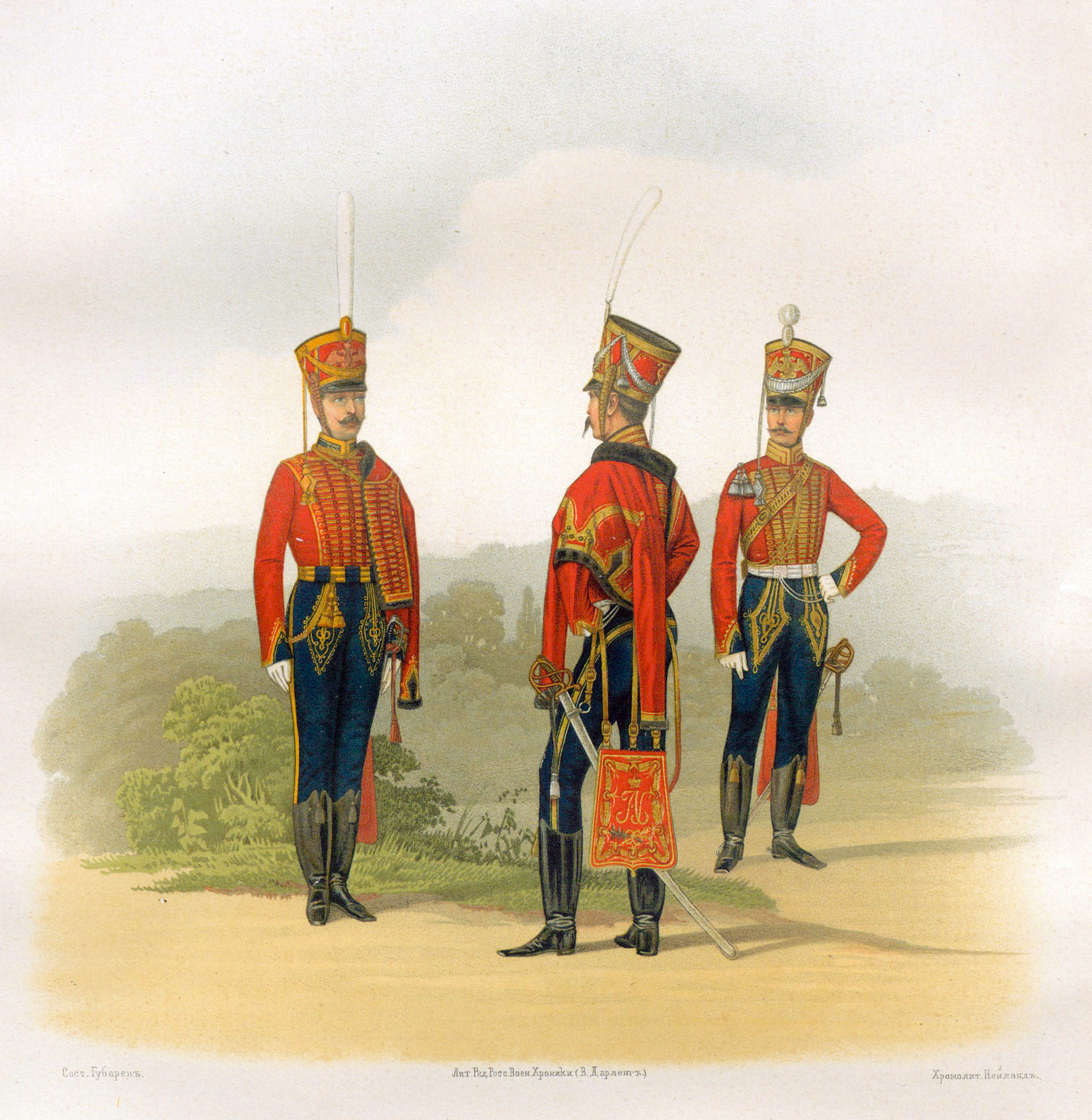
Chief Officer, Private (1819–1820), Chief Officer (1823–1825)

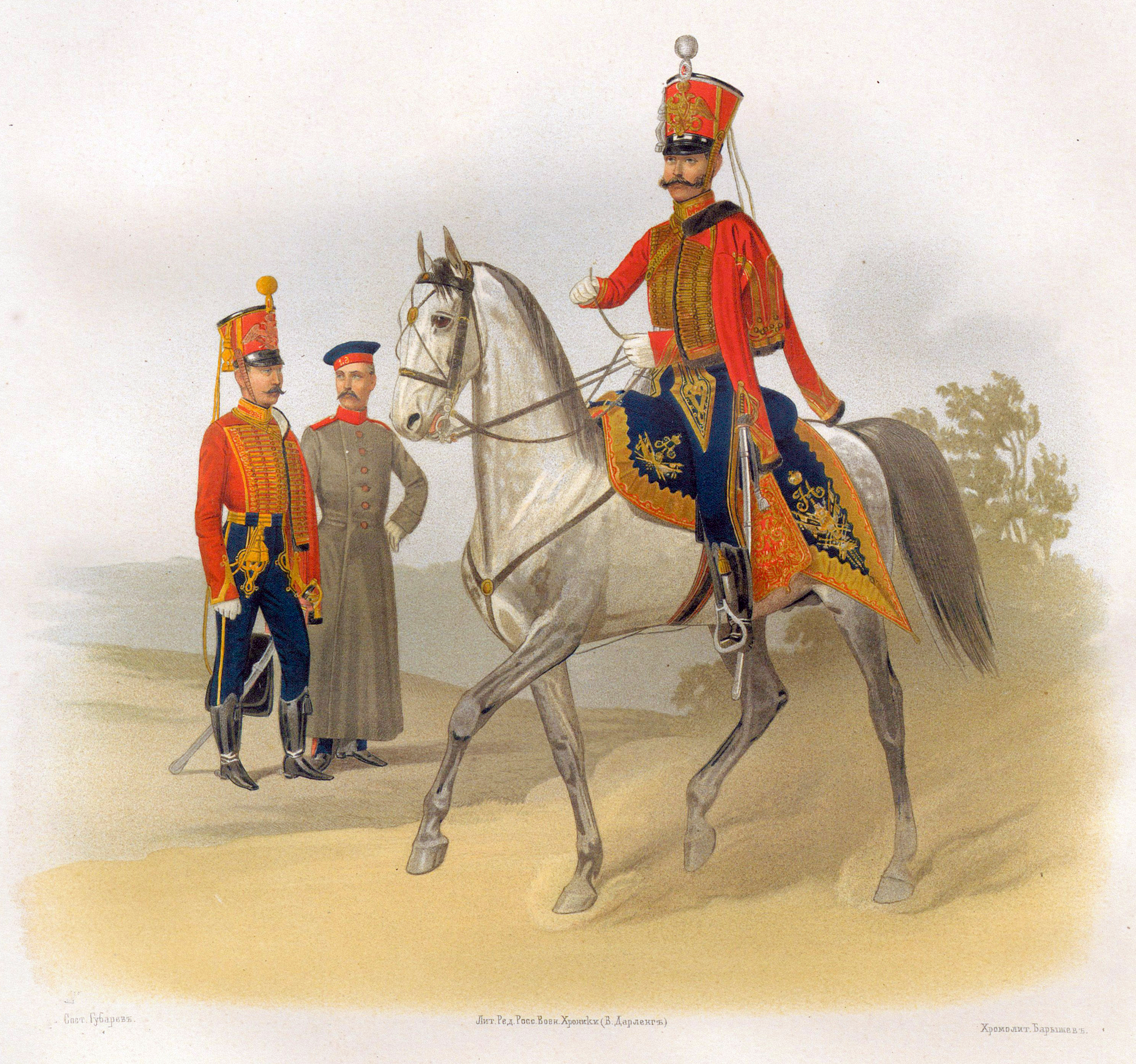
Staff officer, Private in full dress, Private in greatcoat (1827–1835)

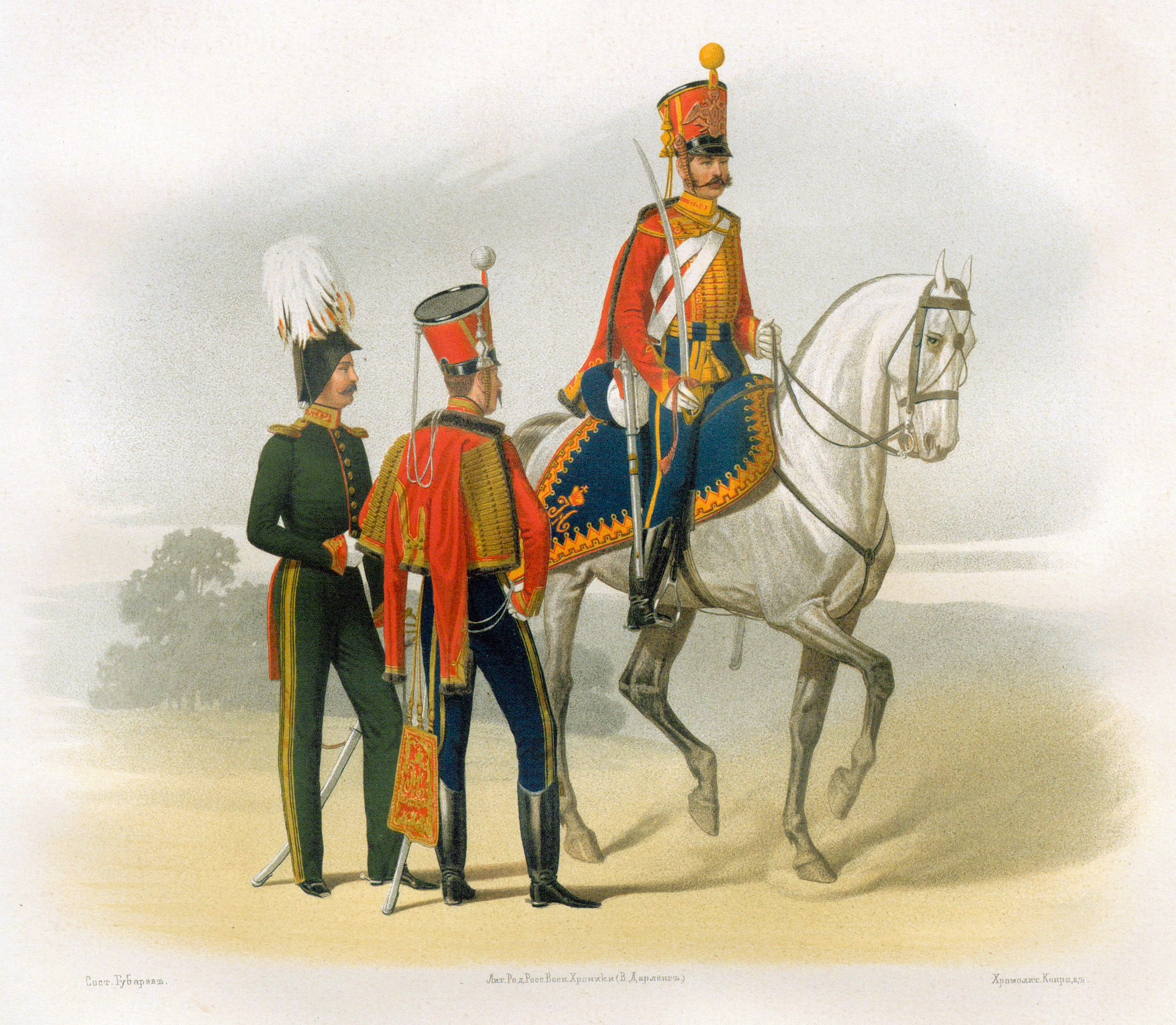
Chief Officer, Private in full dress (1835–1838), Chief Officer in vice uniform (1826–1833)

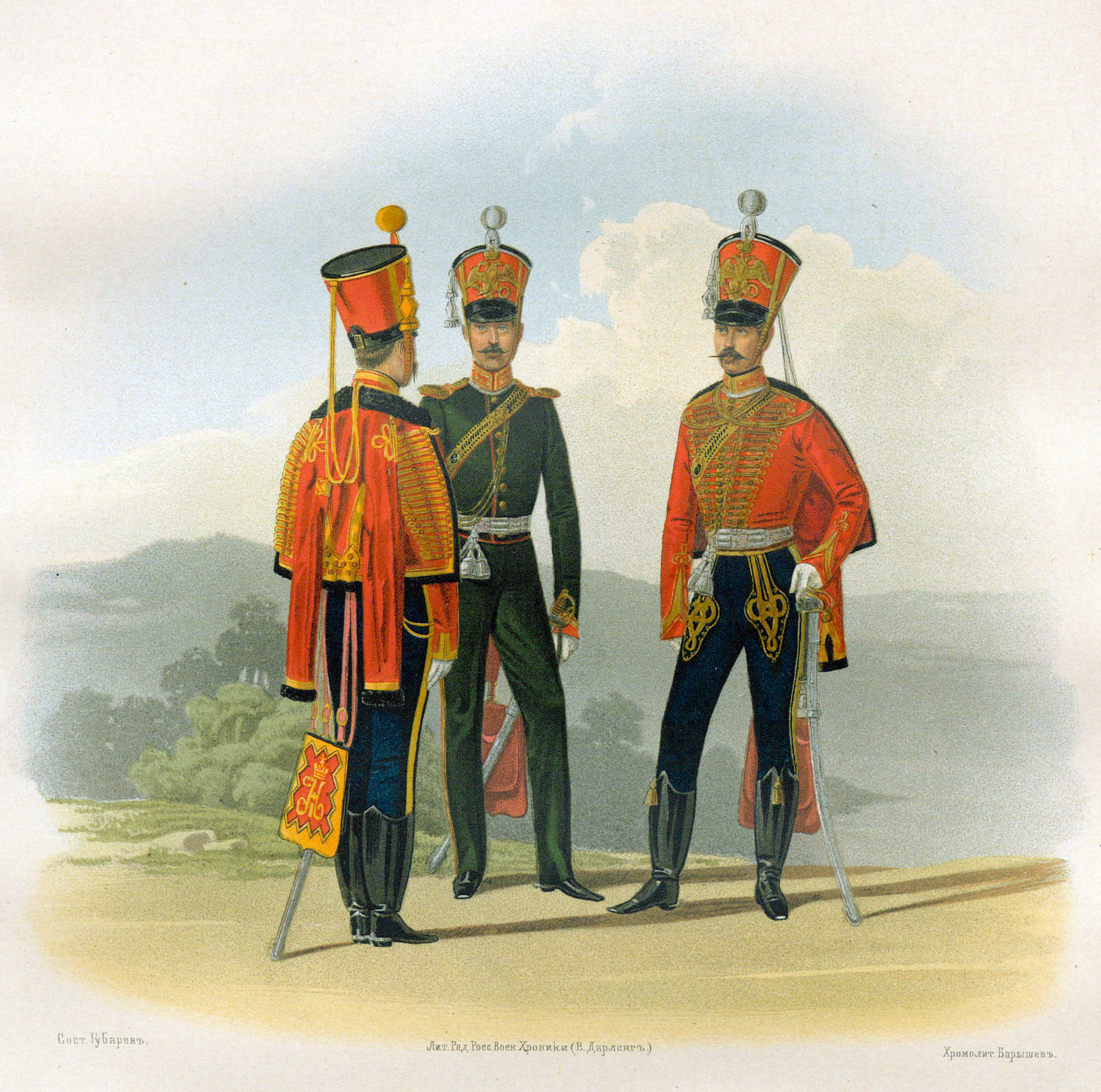
Chief Officer, Private in full dress (1838–1843), Chief Officer on duty (1843–1845)

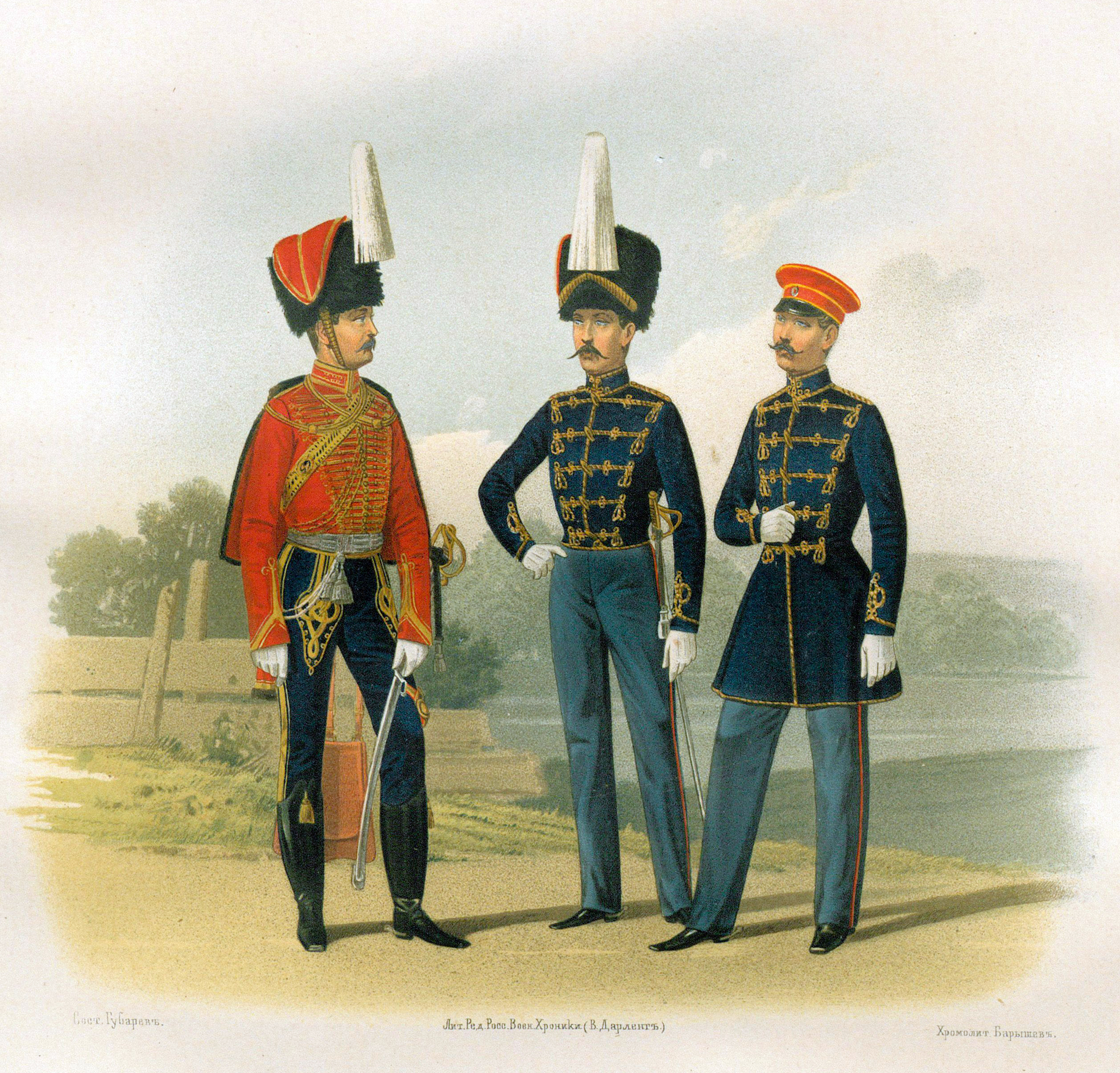
In full dress, in Hungarian, and in everyday uniform (1845–1855)

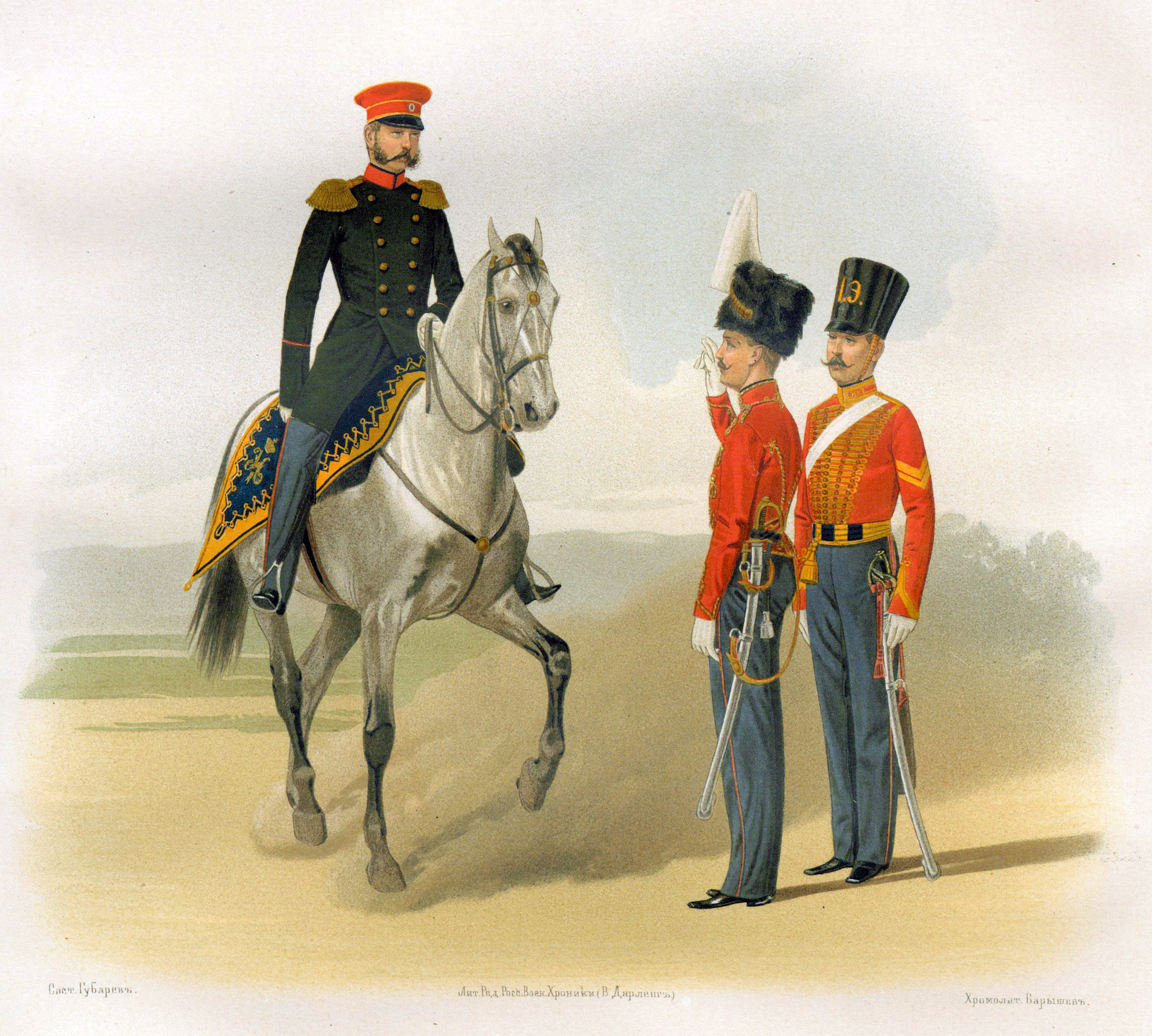
General in a frock coat (1844–54), Chief Officer in everyday uniform (1852–55), Private in marching uniform (1845–55)

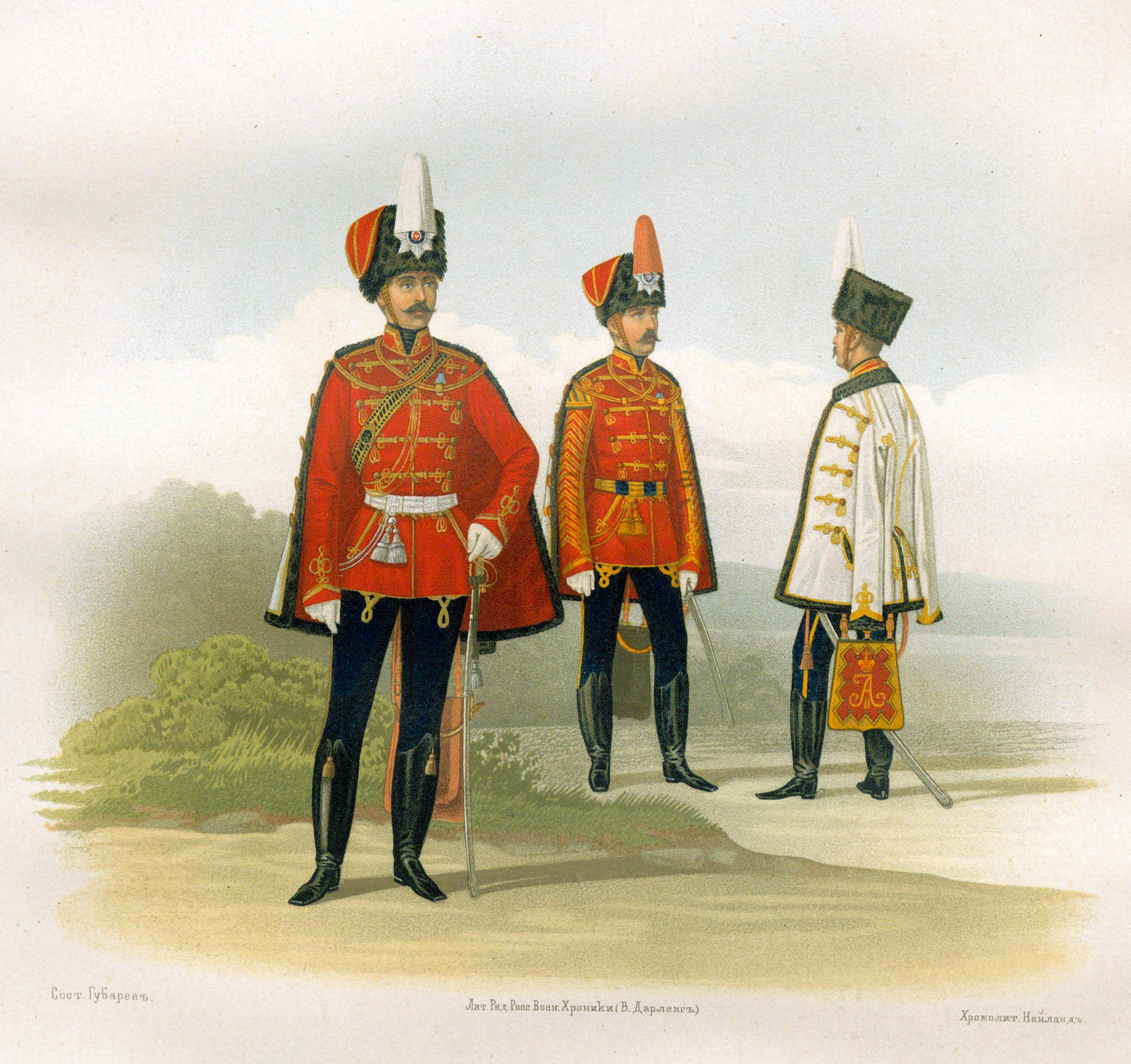
Chief Officer, Trumpeter and Private in full dress (1855–1857)

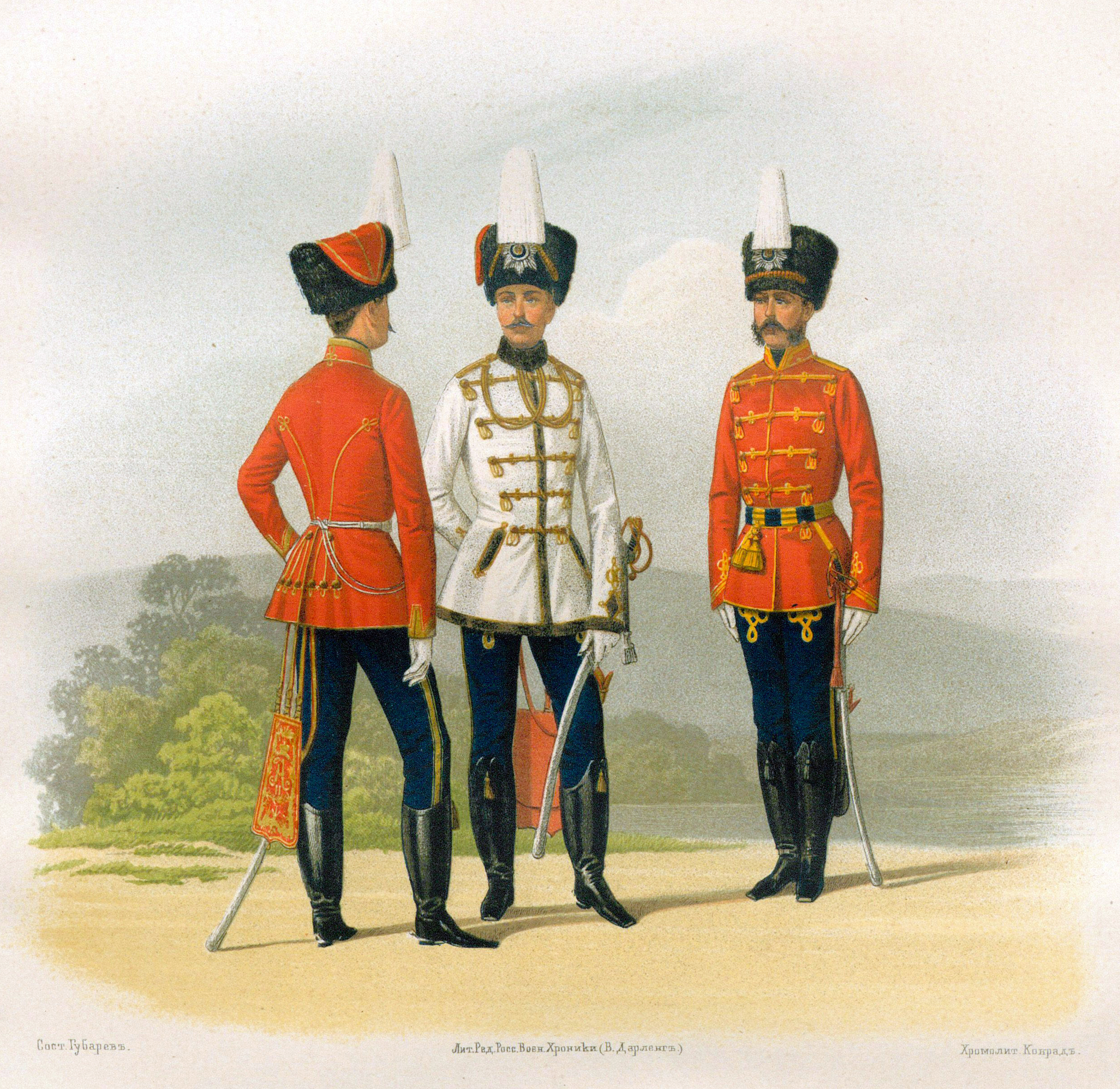
Chief Officers and Private in full dress (1855–1857)

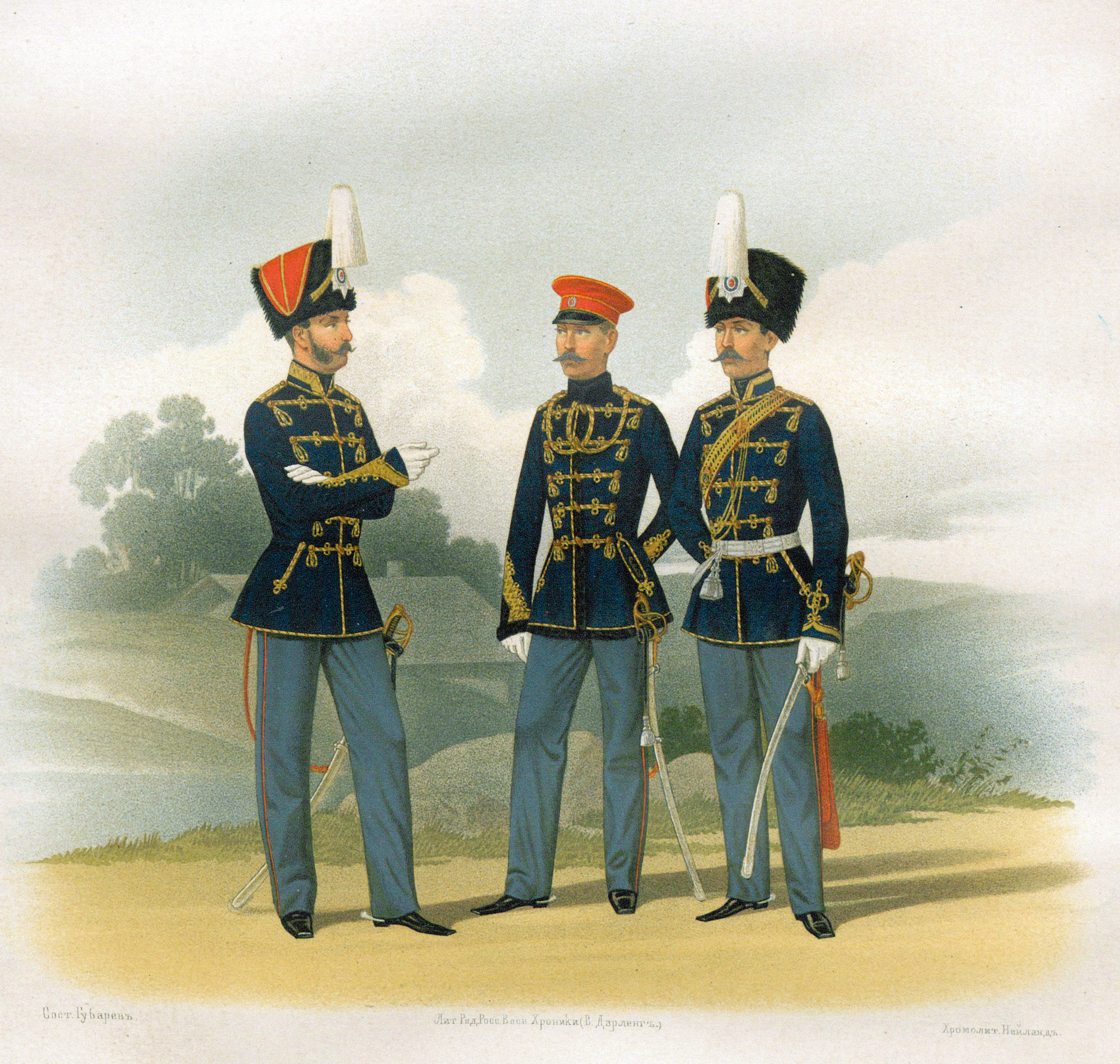
Staff Officers in daily uniform, in Hungarian and Chief Officer in duty uniform (1855–1857)

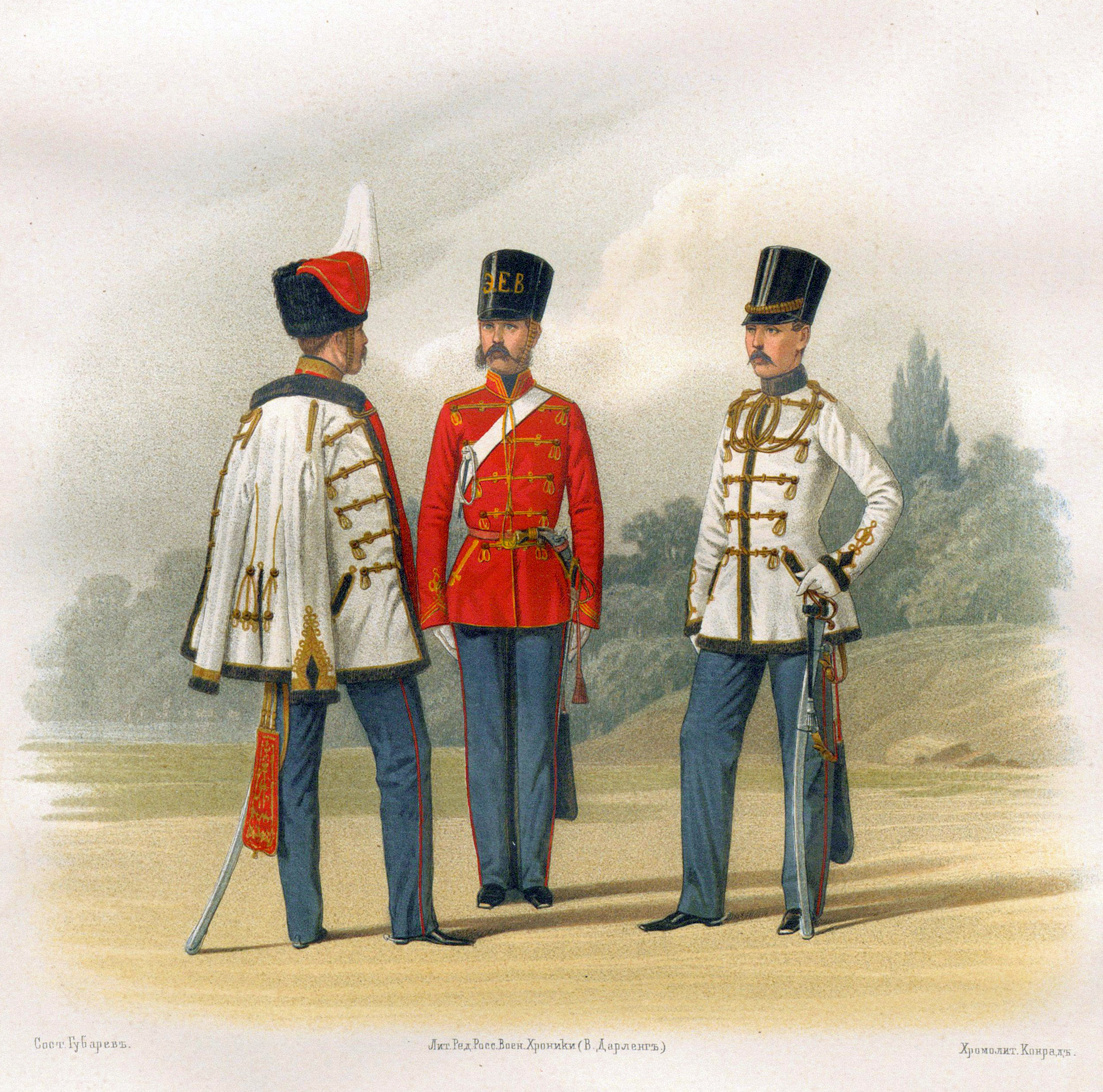
Headquarters and Chief Officers in full dress, Private in marching uniform (1855–1857)

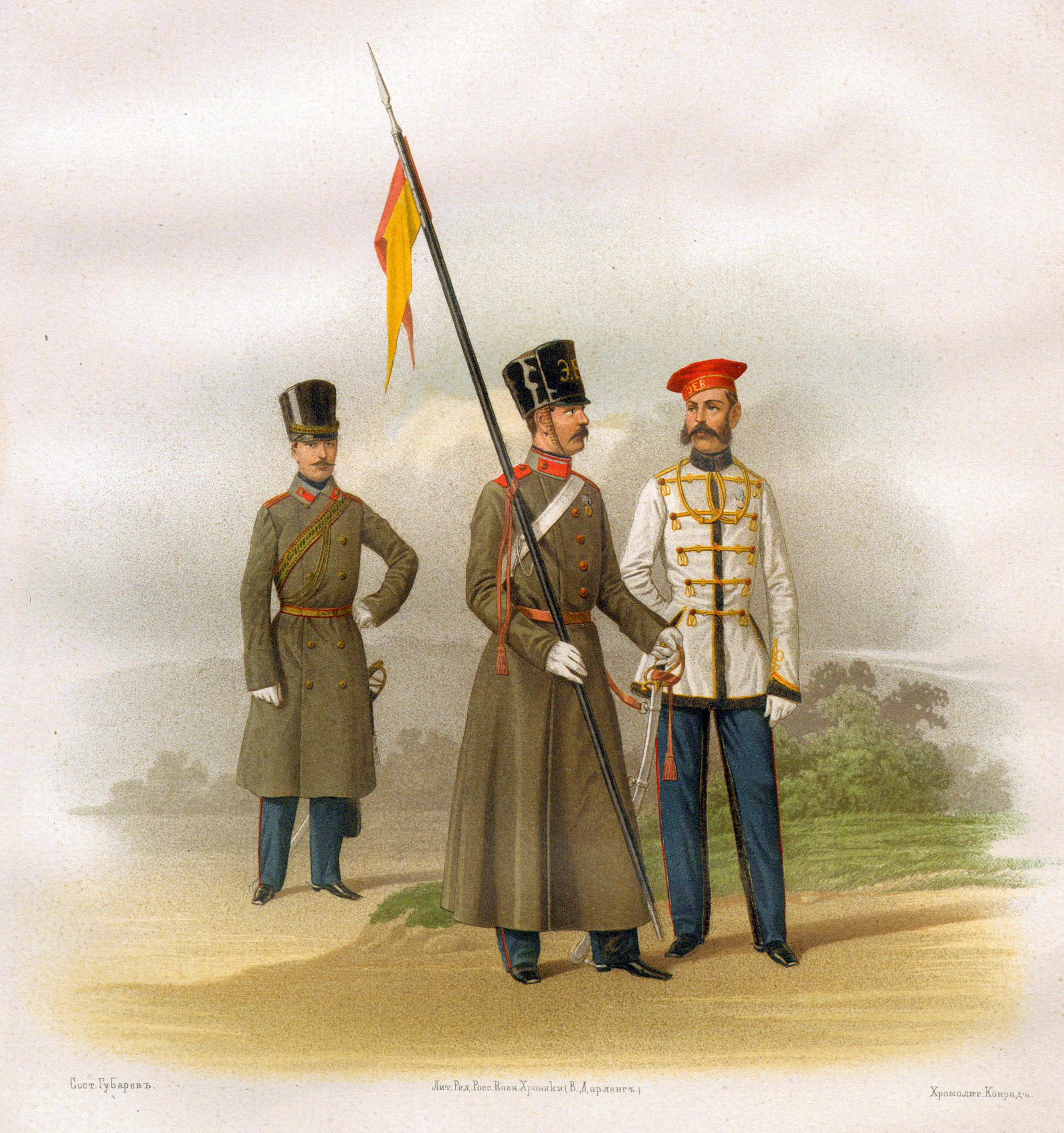
Chief Officer and Private in marching uniform, Private in everyday uniform (1855–1857)

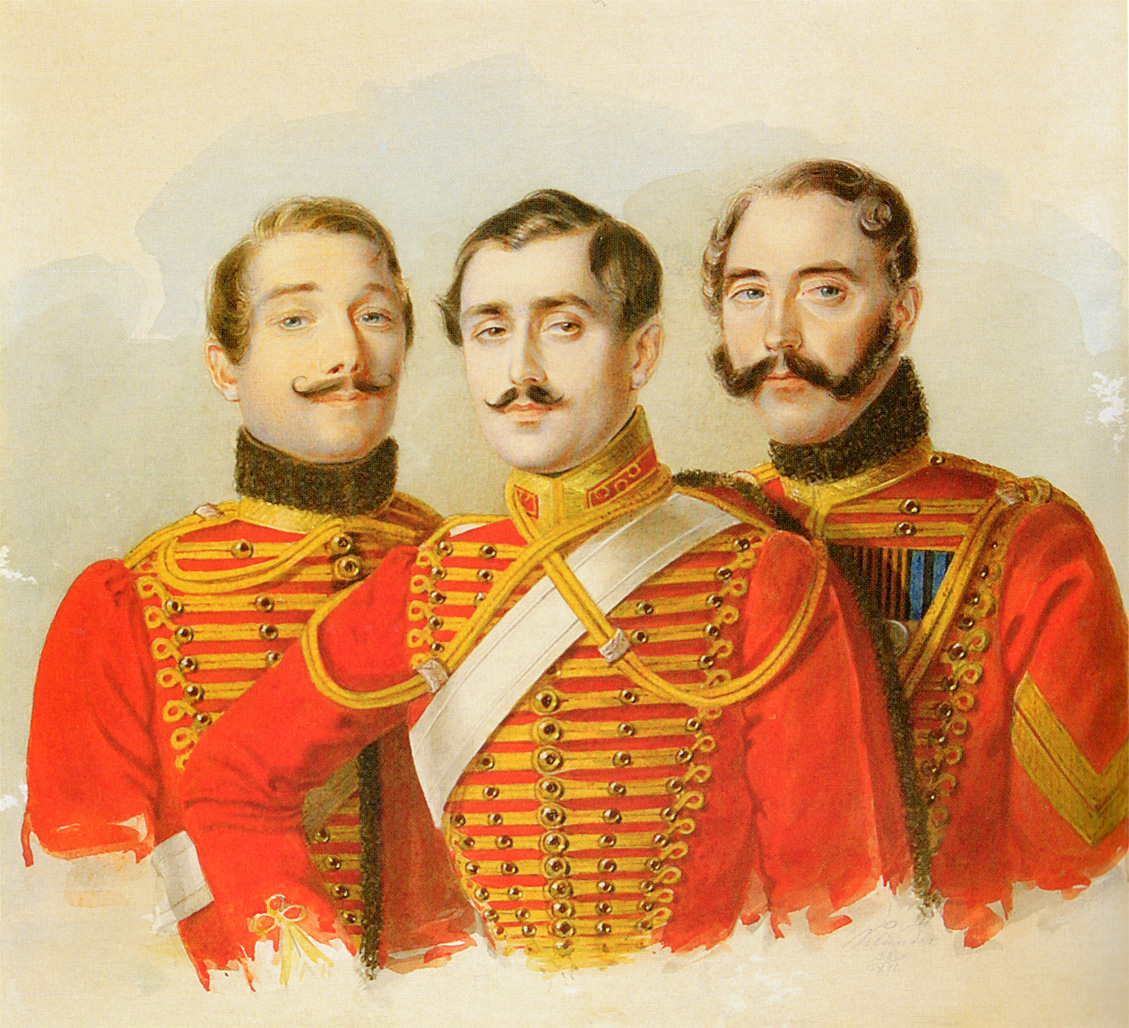
Non–Commissioned Officers of the Life Guards Hussar Regiment, 1830s

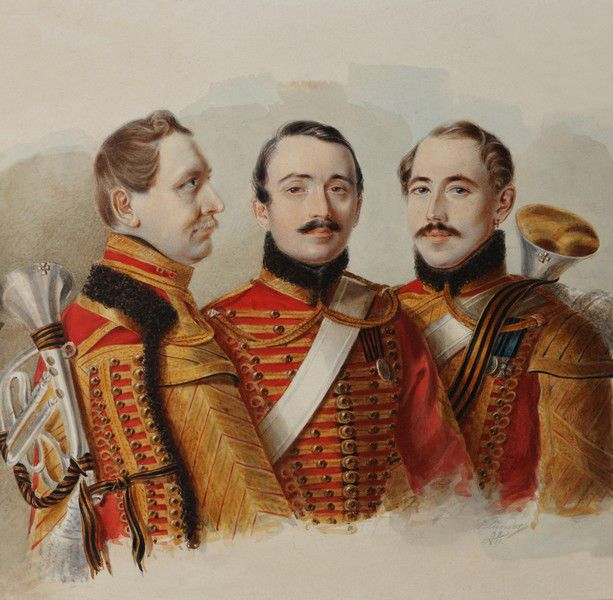
"Portrait of the Trumpeters of the Life Guards Hussar Regiment", 1836, Alexander Klinder

== 1914 uniform ==
General hussar. Doloman, crown, shlyk, band, shoulder straps, barbarians, valve – coat, greatcoat, lining – scarlet, mentik – white, metal device – gold.

=== Vane ===
Colors: top – scarlet, stripe – yellow, bottom – yellow.

== Marks of excellence ==
1. George's Standard with the Inscription "For Distinction in the Defeat and Expulsion of the Enemy From the Borders of Russia in 1812";
2. 23 George's Trumpets with the Inscription "For Warsaw on August 25 and 26, 1831";
3. Badges on Headdresses with the Inscription "For Telish on October 12, 1877";
4. Badges on Headdresses with the Inscription "For Tashkisen on December 19, 1877".

== Regiment colonels-in-chief ==
- November 7, 1796 – September 13, 1802 – Lieutenant Colonel (from November 8, 1796 – Colonel, from November 12, 1796 – Brigadier, from December 28, 1798 – Major General, from April 6, 1798 – Lieutenant General) Andrey Kologrivov;
- September 13, 1802 – April 24, 1807 – General of the Cavalry Ludwig, Duke of Württemberg;
- April 24 – October 24, 1807 – Lieutenant General Andrey Kologrivov;
- October 29, 1807 – April 22, 1818 – Major General (from December 12, 1807 – Lieutenant General, from October 22, 1812 – General of the Cavalry) Count Peter Wittgenstein;
- April 22, 1818 – March 1, 1881 – Grand Duke Tsarevich Alexander Nikolaevich (from February 19, 1855 – Emperor Alexander II);
- March 2, 1881 – October 21, 1894 – Emperor Alexander III (from October 28, 1866 – 2nd Chief);
- November 2, 1894 – March 4, 1917 – Emperor Nicholas II.

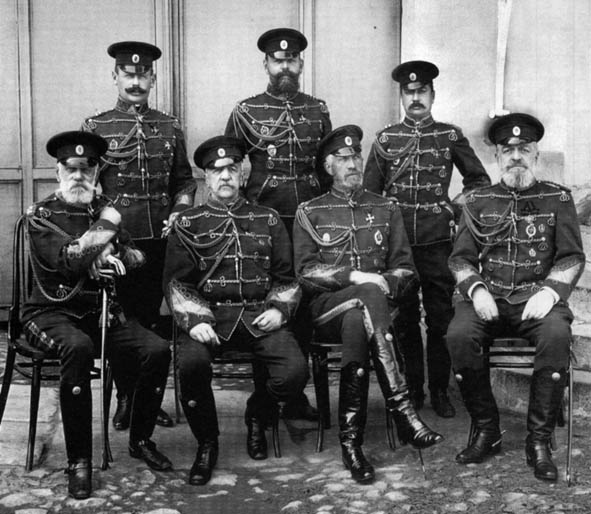
Regiment commanders of different years. From left to right: Feofil Meyendorf, Illarion Vorontsov–Dashkov, Grand Duke Nikolai Nikolaevich the Younger, Sergei Vasilchikov are sitting; standing Vladimir Voeikov, Pavel Engalychev, Boris Petrovo–Solovovo

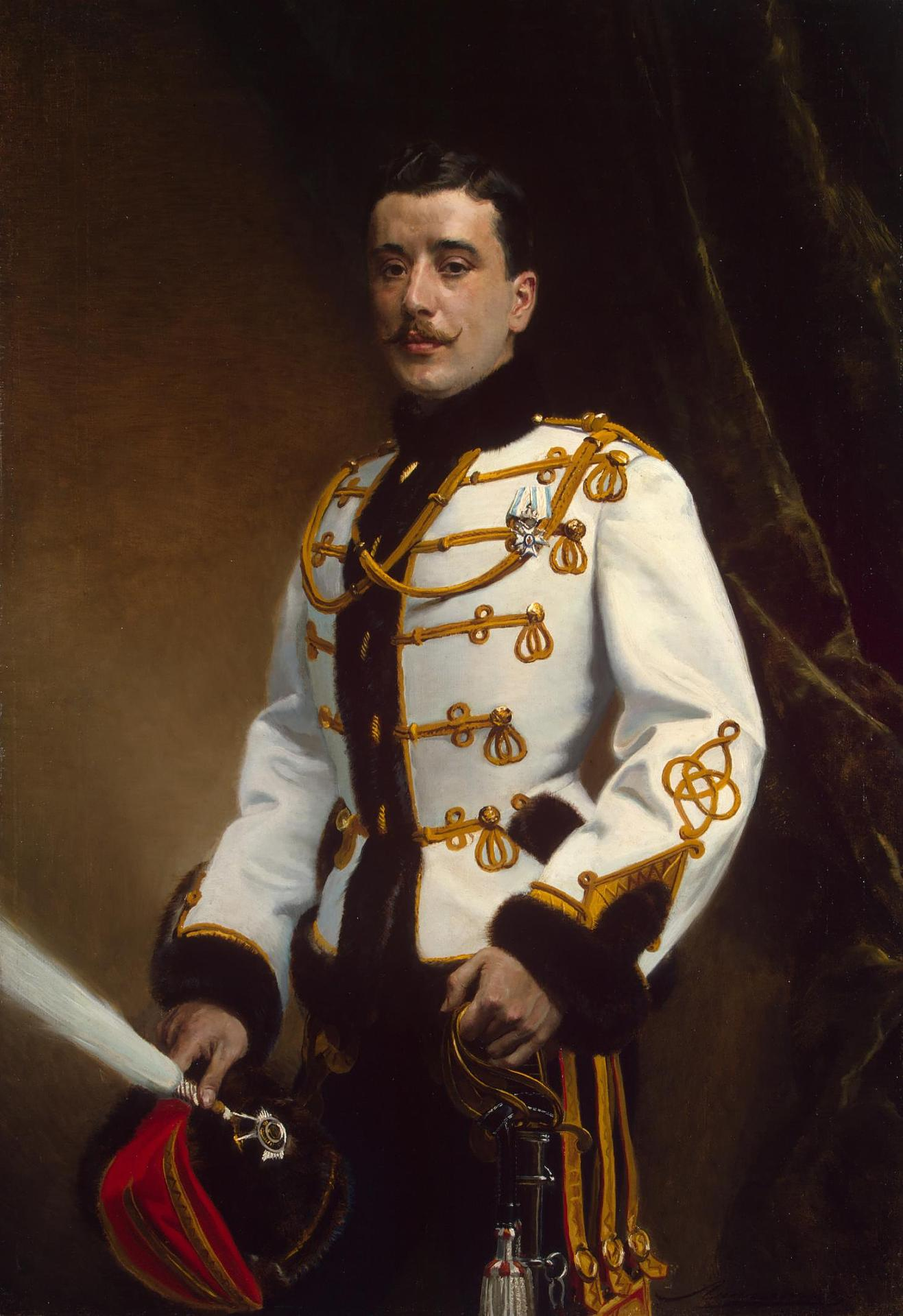
Portrait of the cornet of the Life Guards Hussar Regiment Pyotr Raevsky. 1913. Ernst Lipgart

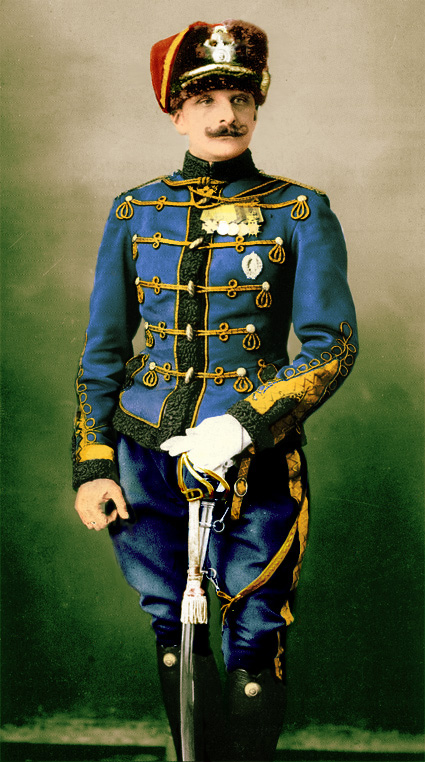
Colonel Boris Petrovo–Solovovo, regiment commander, 1905

== Commanders ==
- September 9, 1798 – January 12, 1800 – Major General Prince Semyon Salagov;
- January 12, 1800 – October 27, 1800 – Major General Anton Tomich;
- November 8, 1800 – November 29, 1801 – Major General Andrey Bolotnikov;
- September 13, 1802 – April 24, 1807 – Lieutenant General Andrey Kologrivov;
- November 28, 1808 – October 4, 1813 – Major General (from August 30, 1813 – Lieutenant General) Ivan Shevich;
  - Beginning of 1813 – September 7, 1813 – Colonel Davydov;
  - September 7, 1813 – September 17, 1813 – Colonel Ivan Troshchinsky;
  - September 17, 1813 – January 25, 1814 – (temporarily) Colonel Arseny Korovkin;
  - February 16, 1814 – April 25, 1814 – (temporarily) Colonel Nikolai Andreevsky;
- April 25, 1814 – May 23, 1822 – Major General (from February 18, 1817 – Adjutant General) Vasily Levashov;
- May 23, 1822 – May 17, 1824 – Major General Prince Stepan Khilkov;
- May 24, 1824 – July 1, 1826 – Adjutant General Vasily Levashov;
- July 1, 1826 – September 23, 1833 – Colonel (from December 2, 1826 – Major General) Baron Yegor Arpsgofen;
- September 23, 1833 – July 15, 1839 – Major General Mikhail Khomutov;
- July 25, 1839 – April 11, 1843 – Major General (from April 11, 1843 – Lieutenant General) Nikolai Plautin;
- April 11, 1843 – July 5, 1848 – Major General Baron Anton Engelhardt;
  - May 11, 1844 – November 9, 1844 – (temporarily) Major General Prince Alexander of Hesse–Darmstadt;
- July 5, 1848 – January 1, 1856 – Major General Baron Alexander Budberg;
- January 1, 1856 – November 26, 1858 – Major General (from November 6, 1857 – Major General of the Retinue) Baron Ferdinand Wintzengerode;
- November 26, 1858 – May 4, 1863 – Major General of the Retinue, Prince Vladimir Yashvil;
- May 4, 1863 – January 4, 1865 – Major General of the Retinue Pyotr Albedinsky;
- January 10, 1865 – October 15, 1867 – Major General Dmitry Tatishchev;
- October 15, 1867 – October 21, 1874 – Major General Count Illarion Vorontsov–Dashkov;
- November 6, 1874 – May 6, 1877 – Major General Baron Feofil Meyendorf;
- May 6, 1884 – November 10, 1890 – Adjutant Wing, Colonel (from August 30, 1885 – Major General) Grand Duke Nikolay Nikolaevich the Younger;
- November 10, 1890 – August 11, 1896 – Major General Prince Sergei Vasilchikov;
- August 11, 1896 – June 1, 1902 – Major General (from June 1, 1902 – Major General of the Retinue) Prince Alexander Gagarin;
- June 8, 1902 – September 6, 1905 – Major General of the Retinue, Prince Pavel Engalychev;
- September 7, 1905 – September 23, 1905 – Adjutant Wing, Colonel Ivan Eremenko;
- September 24, 1905 – August 11, 1907 – Adjutant Wing, Colonel (from November 6, 1905 – Major General of the Retinue) Boris Petrovo–Solovovo;
- August 11, 1907 – December 24, 1913 – Adjutant Wing, Colonel (from December 6, 1909 – Major General of the Retinue) Vladimir Voeikov;
- December 24, 1913 – August 4, 1915 – Major General (from March 22, 1915 – Major General of the Retinue) Georgy Shevich;
- August 5, 1915 – May 8, 1917 – Major General (from November 6, 1915 – Major General of the Retinue) Dmitry Levshin;
- May 8, 1917 – November 1917 – Major General Prince Vladimir Kantakuzen;
- November 1917 – Colonel Baron Vitaly Nettelgorst.

== George knights ==
- Gavriil Romanov, Lieutenant, Adjutant Wing, Life Guards Hussar Regiment – George's Weapon (Highest Order dated October 22, 1914); together with the 4th Squadron of the regiment left the encirclement in East Prussia at the end of August 1914;
- Nikolai Zvegintsov, Colonel, Life Guards Hussar Regiment – George's Weapon (Highest Order of November 10, 1914);
- Oleg Romanov, His Highness Prince, Cornet, Life Guards Hussar Regiment – Order of Saint George, 4th Degree (Highest Order of 1914);
- Igor Romanov, His Highness Prince, Cornet, Life Guards Hussar Regiment – George's Weapon (Highest Order of 1914); together with the 4th Squadron of the regiment left the encirclement in East Prussia at the end of August 1914;
- Boris Smetsky, Colonel, Life Guards Hussar Regiment – George's Weapon (Highest Order of May 5, 1915);
- Boris Golitsyn, Cornet, Life Guards Hussar Regiment – George's Weapon (Highest Order of June 10, 1915);
- Alexander Romanovsky–Leuchtenberg, Captain, Life Guards Hussar Regiment – George's Weapon (Highest Order of November 15, 1915);
- Vladimir Bezobrazov, Cornet, Life Guards Hussar Regiment – George's Weapon (Highest Order of 1915);
- Alexander Tolstoy, Colonel, Life Guards Hussar Regiment – George's Arms (Highest Order of January 24, 1917);
- Alexey Orlov, Staff Captain, Life Guards Hussar Regiment – George's Weapon (Highest Order of January 24, 1917).

== Distinguished soldiers of the regiment ==
- Iosif Pankratov was a Full George Cavalier, a senior non–commissioned officer.

== Famous Life Hussars ==
Major General (1822) Alexander Chechensky (Raevsky): "On August 12 at the village of Tefenbrike; on August 19 and 20 in the rear of the enemy army; on September 8, when the town of Cebrig was occupied and in driving the enemy from it to the city of Delicha, and he took more than 500 people prisoner, on October 5 near the city of Tolkhe, where he captured several officers and lower ranks, and for the distinction in these matters the Life Guards was transferred to the Hussar Regiment; in Westphalia during the pursuit of the enemy from Osnabrück, where he was wounded; on October 6 near Leipzig, on December 8 and 9 in Holland, during the capture of the fortress of Breda, from where he was sent with a regiment to the fortress of Vilemstat, where he forced the enemy to leave the fortress from which up to a hundred cannons and up to 60 rowing ships were taken, and was at all times watching the garrison of the fortress of Antwerp, for which he was awarded the order Saint Vladimir, 3rd Class. On February 2, 1814, in France during the capture of the city of Soissans, on February 22 and 23 at the town of Craon, on February 25 and 26 at the city of Laon, where he was twice wounded and awarded a diamond badge for excellence in these matters of Order of Saint Anna, 2nd Class and finally on March 18 at the city of Paris and for the distinction in this matter was promoted to colonel".

== Regimental church ==
The regimental church was Sophia Cathedral in Tsarskoe Selo.

== Horse breeds in the regiment ==
Until 1823, the Regiment was on horses of different colors, but from October 26, 1815, it was ordered to distribute the horses in squadrons by wool: in the Leib Squadron – gray, in the squadron of Colonel Korovkin (2) – black, in the squadron of Colonel Albrecht (3) – red, in the squadron of Colonel Andreevsky (4) – gray, in the squadron of Colonel Prince Abamelik (5) – bay, in the squadron of Major General Levashov (6) – bay. Trumpeters – dun and salted. In 1823, it was ordered in the Guards Cavalry, the regiments to have horses in wool. Hussar Life Guards – to have bay horses.

In 1827, the Life Guards Hussar Regiment had gray horses.

== Traditions ==
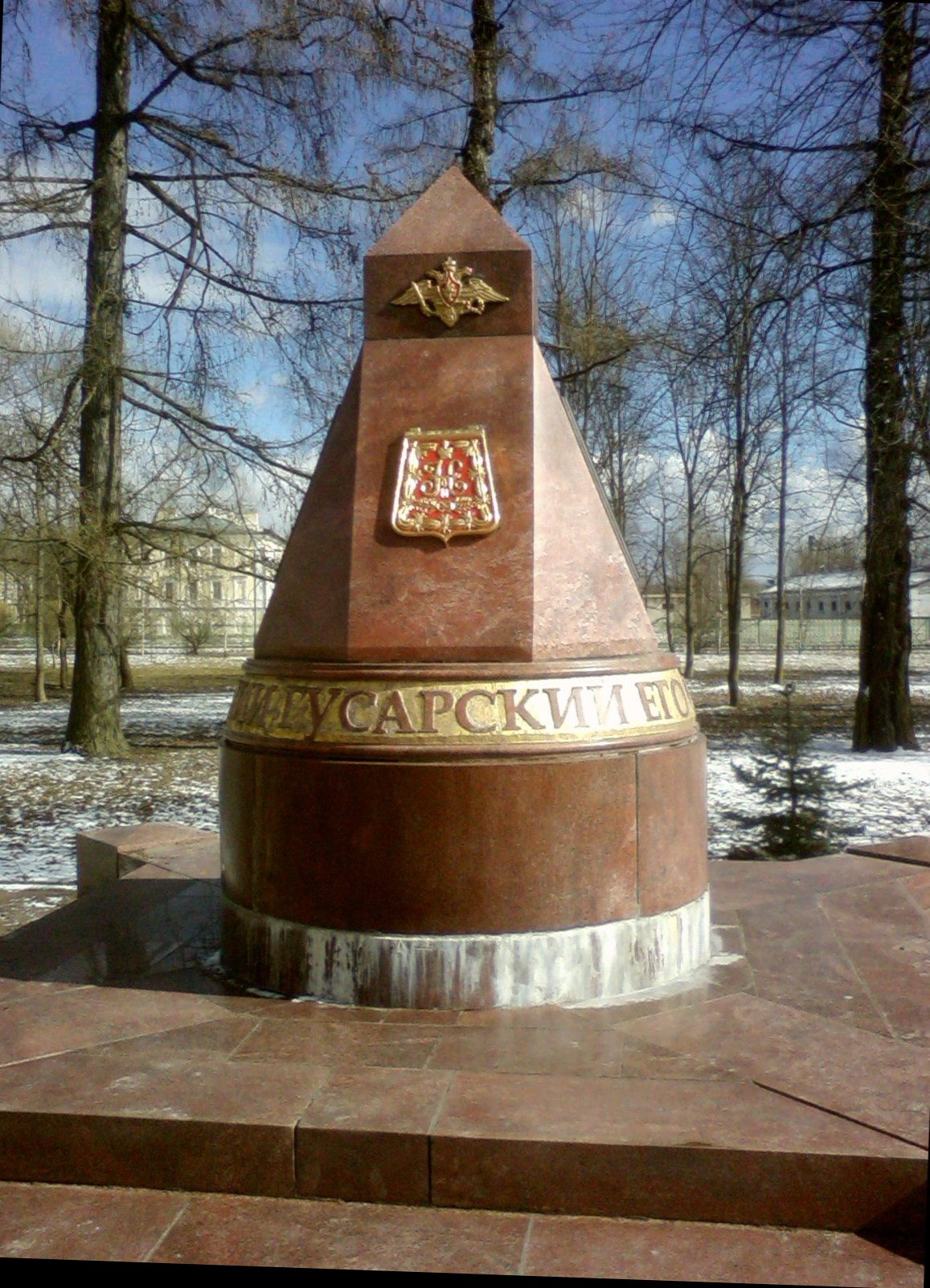
Commemorative sign

Regimental holiday: November 6 – the day of Saint Paul the Confessor.

Since the reign of Alexander I, the Life Guards Hussar Regiment has traditionally participated in the following parades:

– Annually on the day of Epiphany on January 6;

– On the day of Holy Easter;

– Annually at the beginning of summer and autumn, at general parades and the highest reviews for all regiments of the guard.

== Commemorative sign ==
In June 2003, a memorial sign for the regiment was erected on the territory of the Sophia Cathedral in Tsarskoe Selo.

The project manager was sculptor V. N. Filippov, chief architect V. V. Smolin, architect V. N. Golovkin. The military component of the creative group was represented by the head of the Department of the Saint Petersburg Military Engineering and Technical University, Candidate of Architecture Colonel E. E. Lavrushin and Professor of the Department of Architecture, Doctor of Architecture V. I. Mukhin.

The monument was erected in accordance with the program of the Ministry of Defense of the Russian Federation "Saint Petersburg – the Military–Scientific and Military–Industrial Center of the Country" with the support of the administration of the city of Saint Petersburg.
