= Order of Saint Anna =

Russian order of chivalry

Imperial Order of Saint Anna Орден Святой Анны
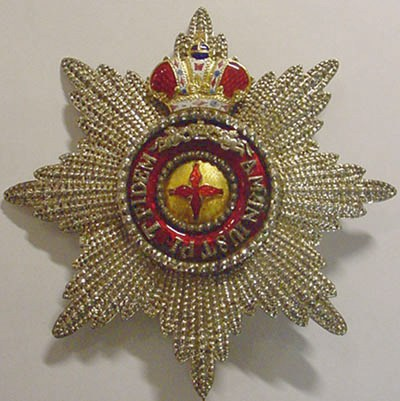
- Star of the Order

Awarded by Head of the House of Romanov
- Type: Dynastic Order
- Royal house: House of Romanov
- Religious affiliation: Russian Orthodox
- Motto: Amantibus Justitiam, Pietatem, Fidem; To those who Love Justice, Piety, and Fidelity
- Status: Rarely awarded
- Grades: 1st, 2nd, 3rd and 4th Class, with the Anna medal awarded for meritorious service.

Precedence
- Next (higher): Imperial Order of St. Prince Vladimir
- Next (lower): Imperial Order of St. Nicholas the Wonderworker
- Ribbon of the order

The Imperial Order of Saint Anna (Russian: Орден Святой Анны; also "Order of Saint Anne" or "Order of Saint Ann") was a Holstein ducal and then Russian imperial order of chivalry. It was established by Karl Friedrich, Duke of Holstein-Gottorp, on 14 February 1735, in honour of his wife Anna Petrovna, daughter of Peter the Great of Russia.

Originally, the Order of Saint Anna was a dynastic order of knighthood; but between 1797 and 1917 it had dual status as a dynastic order and as a state order. The Order of St. Anna continued to be awarded after the revolution by Grand Duke Kirill Vladimirovich, Grand Duke Vladimir Kirillovich, and Grand Duchess Maria Vladimirovna. Today, the Russian Imperial Order of St. Anna, awarded by Grand Duchess Maria Vladimirovna is recognized as an order of chivalry by the privately operated International Commission for Orders of Chivalry as a continuation of the pre-Revolutionary order, and has been approved for wear with military uniform by the Russian Federation, but not by some members of the Romanov Family Association.

Membership of the Order was awarded for a distinguished career in civil service or for valour and distinguished service in the military. The Order of Saint Anna entitled recipients of the first class to hereditary nobility, and recipients of lower classes to personal nobility. For military recipients, it was awarded with swords. It is now usually awarded for meritorious service to the Imperial House of Russia.

Recipients of the Order of St. Andrew (K.A.) (including grand dukes, who received the order at baptism, and princes of the Imperial blood, who received it at their majority) simultaneously received the first class of the Order of Saint Anna. The Emperor himself was the hereditary grand master of the Order.

The motto of the Order is "Amantibus Justitiam, Pietatem, Fidem" ("To those who love justice, piety, and fidelity"). Its festival day is 3 February (New Style, 16 February). The Head of the Imperial House of Russia always is Master of the imperial Order of Saint Anna.

== History ==
At first, the Order had but one class and was named the "Order of Anna". The statutes of the Order promulgated in 1735 established as the principal insignia a red-enameled gold cross, with an image of Saint Anne imposed upon the centre of the cross; the reverse bore the initials "A.I.P.F." (for "Anna Imperatoris Petri Filia": "Anna, Emperor Peter's daughter" in Latin). The same letters also abbreviate the Latin motto (as the letter "J" did not exist in Latin, "Iustitiam" was the original spelling of the word now rendered "Justitiam").

In 1742, Karl Peter Ulrich, Duke Karl Friedrich's son, was declared the Russian heir apparent. After arriving in Russia, he presented the Order to several courtiers. On 15 April 1797, his own son, Emperor Paul I of Russia, established the Order as part of the Imperial Russian system of honours and divided it into three classes, renaming it the "Order of Saint Anna". Emperor Alexander I added a fourth class in 1815.

The title of Chekhov's well-known story "Anna on the Neck" refers both to the Order and to the heroine.

In Chapter IV of Crime and Punishment, Raskolnikov guesses that Luzhin must have, "...the Anna in his buttonhole and that he puts it on when he goes to dine with contractors or merchants."

== Insignia ==
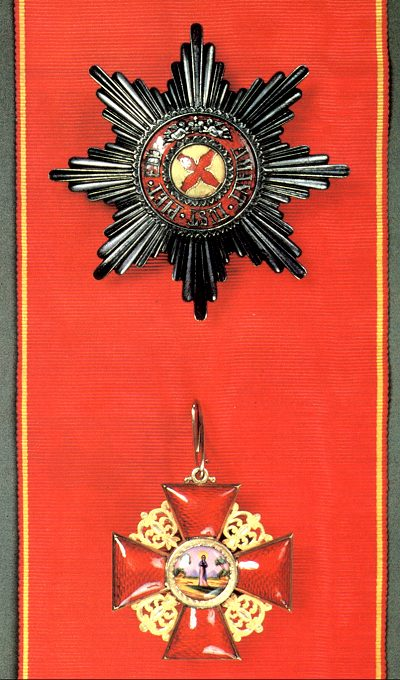
Order of St. Anna, 1st class

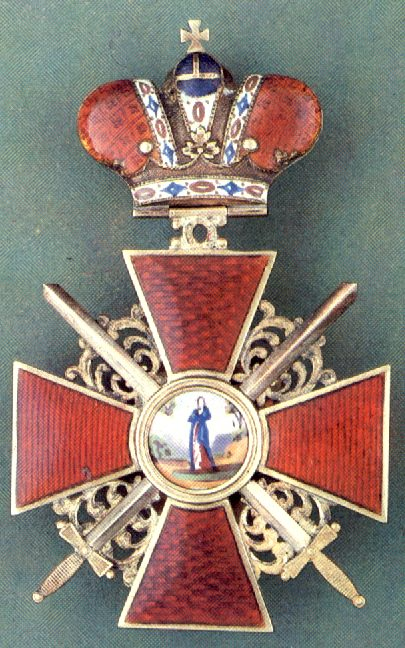
Order of St. Anna, 2nd class (The example shown is "with swords", for bravery in battle, and crown)

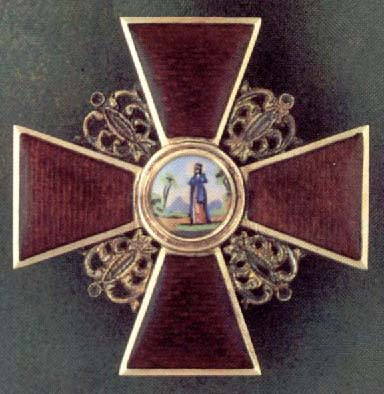
Order of St. Anna, 3rd class

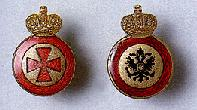
Order of St. Anna, 4th class (The insignia with imperial eagle would have been awarded to a non-Christian, for whom a Christian cross was deemed inappropriate)

== Methods of wear ==
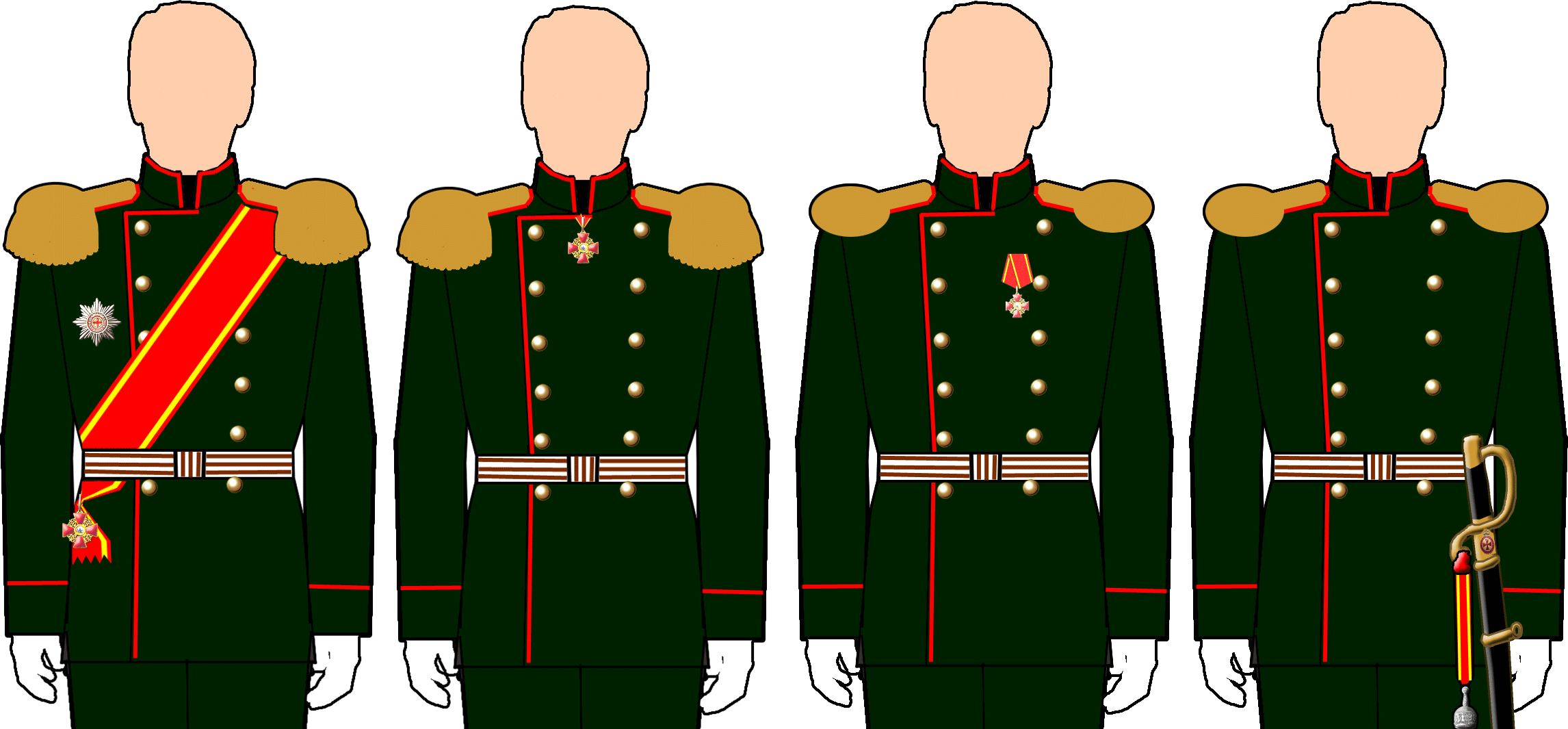

- 1st class: Cross worn at the bow of a broad ribbon (ten centimeters wide, worn over the left shoulder), on the right hip; star of the Order (about 95 millimeters in diameter) worn on the right breast
- 2nd class: Cross worn on a neck ribbon, 45 millimeters wide
- 3rd class: Cross worn on the left ribbon, suspended from a ribbon 28 millimeters wide
- 4th class: Cross borne on the pommel of an edged weapon, together with a silver-tasselled sword-knot of the ribbon of the Order

The medal ribbon was red with narrow yellow edging.

A recipient of higher classes of the Order would not wear the insignia of lower classes, unless he had also been awarded the fourth class (the insignia of which was borne on the hilt of a sword or other edged weapon).

== Notable recipients ==
List of recipients by class

1st Class

- Alexander Abaza
- Frederick Adam
- Adolphus Frederick V, Grand Duke of Mecklenburg-Strelitz
- Adrian Nepenin
- Hasan bey Agalarov
- Ahmad Shah Qajar
- Albert I of Belgium
- Prince Albert of Prussia (1809–1872)
- Archduke Albrecht, Duke of Teschen
- Albert, Prince Consort
- Mikhail Alekseyev
- Ilya I. Alekseyev
- Yevgeni Ivanovich Alekseyev
- Alexander I of Russia
- Alexander I of Yugoslavia
- Alexander II of Russia
- Alexander III of Russia
- Alexander Nikolaevich Golitsyn
- Alexander of Battenberg
- Prince Alexander of Hesse and by Rhine
- Duke Alexander of Oldenburg
- Duke Alexander of Württemberg (1771–1833)
- Alexei Arbuzov (general)
- Alexei Nikolaevich, Tsarevich of Russia
- Gyula Andrássy
- Teodor Andrault de Langeron
- Stepan Andreyevskiy
- Alexander Cambridge, 1st Earl of Athlone
- Prince August, Duke of Dalarna
- Prince August of Württemberg
- Prince Augustus of Prussia
- Theodor Avellan
- Karl Gustav von Baggovut
- Alexander Bagration of Mukhrani
- Pyotr Bagration
- Aleksei Baiov
- Mikhail Bakhirev
- Jafargulu Bakikhanov
- Pyotr Baluyev
- Alexander Barclay de Tolly-Weymarn
- Michael Andreas Barclay de Tolly
- Nikolai Bardovsky
- Edward Barnes (British Army officer)
- Pavel Bashutsky
- Mikhail Batyanov
- Vasili Bebutov
- Friedrich von Beck-Rzikowsky
- Alexander von Benckendorff (diplomat)
- Konstantin von Benckendorff
- Ilya Berezin
- Pyotr Bezobrazov
- Aleksandr Aleksandrovich Bibikov
- Alexander Alexandrovich von Bilderling
- Aleksei Birilev
- Otto von Bismarck
- Gebhard Leberecht von Blücher
- Georgy Bobrikov
- Nikolai Bobyr
- Woldemar von Boeckmann
- Alexander Bozheryanov
- Władysław Grzegorz Branicki
- Walther Bronsart von Schellendorff
- Aleksei Brusilov
- Pavel Bulgakov
- Prince Carl, Duke of Västergötland
- Carlos I of Portugal
- Charles XV
- Alexander Chavchavadze
- Grigori Chernozubov
- Alexander Chernyshyov
- Seraphim Chichagov
- Grigory Choglokov
- Christian IX of Denmark
- Grigoriy Pavlovich Chukhnin
- Andrzej Ciechanowiecki
- Prince Constantine of Imereti (1789–1844)
- Didi-Niko Dadiani
- Mikhail Pavlovich Danilov
- Dmitry Dashkov
- Henri Roussel de Courcy
- Dmitry Petrovich Dokhturov
- Leopold Wilhelm von Dobschütz
- Józef Dowbor-Muśnicki
- Alexander Drenteln
- Mikhail Drozdovsky
- Pavel Grigorievich Dukmasov
- Alexander Alexandrovich Dushkevich
- Andrei Eberhardt
- Edward VII
- Carl August Ehrensvärd (1858–1944)
- Johann Martin von Elmpt
- Grigori Engelhardt
- Nikolai Epanchin
- Ernest I, Duke of Saxe-Coburg and Gotha
- Ernest Louis, Grand Duke of Hesse
- Gaston Errembault de Dudzeele (died 1888)
- Gaston Errembault de Dudzeele (died 1929)
- Archduke Eugen of Austria
- Aleksei Evert
- Ferdinand I of Bulgaria
- Ferdinand II of Portugal
- Archduke Ferdinand Karl Joseph of Austria-Este
- Hans William von Fersen
- Nikolai Filatov
- Vladimir Nikolayevich Filipov
- Vasily Flug
- Dmitry Gustavovich von Fölkersahm
- Francis IV, Duke of Modena
- Franz Joseph I of Austria
- Archduke Franz Karl of Austria
- Frederik VIII of Denmark
- Frederick Francis III, Grand Duke of Mecklenburg-Schwerin
- Frederick I, Grand Duke of Baden
- Archduke Friedrich, Duke of Teschen
- Friedrich, Duke of Schleswig-Holstein-Sonderburg-Glücksburg
- Ivan Fullon
- Vasily Gabashvili
- Apollon Galafeyev
- Yermolay Gamper
- Ivan Ganetsky
- Ivan Gannibal
- Charles Gascoigne
- Gavriil Gagarin
- George V
- Aleksandr Gerngross
- Alexander Gertsyk
- Alexander von Güldenstubbe
- August Neidhardt von Gneisenau
- Johann Wolfgang von Goethe
- Vasily Golovnin
- Vladimir Gorbatovsky
- Eugène Goüin
- Ivan Grigorovich
- Oskar Gripenberg
- Gustaf V
- Gustaf VI Adolf
- Gustav, Prince of Vasa
- Haakon VII of Norway
- Sir Robert Hart, 1st Baronet
- Lodewijk van Heiden
- Prince Heinrich of Hesse and by Rhine
- Herbert Holman
- Dmitry Horvat
- Alexander Ievreinov
- Gavriil Ignatyev
- Illarion Vasilchikov
- Alexander Imeretinsky
- Yevgeni Iskritsky
- Nikola Ivanov
- Grigory Ivanovich Villamov
- Archduke John of Austria
- Prince Johann of Schleswig-Holstein-Sonderburg-Glücksburg
- John VI of Portugal
- Joseph, Duke of Saxe-Altenburg
- Georg von Kameke
- Kyprian Kandratovich
- Nikolay Karamzin
- Karl Anton, Prince of Hohenzollern
- Karl, Duke of Schleswig-Holstein-Sonderburg-Glücksburg
- Prince Karl Theodor of Bavaria
- Nikolai Kashtalinsky
- Alexander von Kaulbars
- Paisi Kaysarov
- Gustav von Kessel
- Terence Keyes
- Pyotr Kikin
- Jan Hendrik van Kinsbergen
- Vladimir Kislitsin
- Hans von Koester
- Alexander Kolchak
- Grand Duke Konstantin Konstantinovich of Russia
- Grand Duke Konstantin Nikolayevich of Russia
- Grand Duke Konstantin Pavlovich of Russia
- Konstantin Poltoratsky
- Konstantin of Hohenlohe-Schillingsfürst
- Apostol Kostanda
- Wincenty Krasiński
- Vasily Kravkov
- Gerhard Christoph von Krogh
- Aleksey Kuropatkin
- Aglay Dmitriyevich Kuzmin-Korovaev
- Kyrill (Dmitrieff)
- Sergey Stepanovich Lanskoy
- Pavel Pavlovich Lebedev
- Leonid Lesh
- Leopold I of Belgium
- Leopold II of Belgium
- Leopold IV, Duke of Anhalt
- Alexander Mikhailovich Lermontov
- George Maximilianovich, 6th Duke of Leuchtenberg
- Sergei Georgievich, 8th Duke of Leuchtenberg
- Kazimir Vasilevich Levitsky
- Émile Loubet
- Louis IV, Grand Duke of Hesse
- Prince Louis of Battenberg
- Friedrich von Löwis of Menar
- Archduke Ludwig Viktor of Austria
- Luís I of Portugal
- August von Mackensen
- Sir Charles Madden, 1st Baronet
- Safarbek Malsagov
- Mamia V Gurieli
- Manuel II of Portugal
- Grigorios Maraslis
- Grand Duchess Maria Vladimirovna of Russia
- Maximilian I of Mexico
- Leonid Maykov
- Duke William of Mecklenburg-Schwerin
- Duke Charles of Mecklenburg
- Feofil Egorovich Meyendorf
- Grand Duke Michael Nikolaevich of Russia
- Grand Duke Michael Alexandrovich of Russia
- Miguel I of Portugal
- Konstantin Mikhaylovsky
- Prince Mikheil of Georgia
- Milan I of Serbia
- Mikhail Miloradovich
- Prince Mirian of Georgia
- Mikhail Mirkovich
- Pavel Mishchenko
- Miura Gorō
- Sayyid Mir Muhammad Alim Khan
- Alexander von Moller
- Helmuth von Moltke the Elder
- Helmuth von Moltke the Younger
- Rudolf Montecuccoli
- Nikolay Mordvinov (admiral)
- Hendrik Pieter Nicolaas Muller
- Mikhail Nikitich Muravyov
- James Wolfe Murray
- Valentin Musin-Pushkin
- Ivan Nabokov
- Dmitry Nadyozhny
- Pavel Nakhimov
- Napoleon III
- Tovmas Nazarbekian
- Dmitry Neverovsky
- Vasily Nezabitovsky
- Nicholas II of Russia
- Nicholas Alexandrovich, Tsesarevich of Russia
- Grand Duke Nicholas Nikolaevich of Russia (1831–1891)
- Arkady Nikanorovich Nishenkov
- Vladimir Nikolayevich Nikitin
- Alexander Nikolaevich Volzhin
- Nikolai Stogov
- August Ludwig von Nostitz
- Nikolai Obolensky
- Peter Obolyaninov
- Georgy Orbeliani
- Alexey Fyodorovich Orlov
- David Ivanovich Orlov
- Oscar II
- Fabian Gottlieb von der Osten-Sacken
- Archduke Otto of Austria (1865–1906)
- Otto of Bavaria
- José Paranhos, Viscount of Rio Branco
- Viktor Pashutin
- Duke Paul Frederick of Mecklenburg
- Pedro V of Portugal
- Maurice Pellé
- Duke Peter of Oldenburg
- Racho Petrov
- Prince Philippe, Count of Flanders
- Dmitry Pikhno
- Georg Dubislav Ludwig von Pirch
- Mikhail Mikhailovich Pleshkov
- Carlo Andrea Pozzo di Borgo
- Mohammad Shah Qajar
- Mozaffar ad-Din Shah Qajar
- Naser al-Din Shah Qajar
- Fyodor Radetsky
- Evgeny Aleksandrovich Radkevich
- Nikolai Pavlovich Raev
- Kirill Razumovski
- Nikolai Reitsenshtein
- George Mikhailovich Romanov
- Christopher Roop
- Fyodor Rostopchin
- Nikolay Rtishchev
- Prince Rudolf of Liechtenstein
- Rudolf, Crown Prince of Austria
- Adam Rzhevusky
- Guillaume Emmanuel Guignard, vicomte de Saint-Priest
- Vladimir Viktorovich Sakharov
- Anton Yegorovich von Saltza
- Alexander Samsonov
- Pavel Savvich
- Johan Eberhard von Schantz
- Sergei Sheydeman
- Eduard Schensnovich
- Yakov Schkinsky
- Grand Duke Sergei Alexandrovich of Russia
- Ivan Ivanovich Shamshev
- Dmitry Shcherbachev
- Ivan Shestakov
- Aliagha Shikhlinski
- Dmitry Shuvayev
- Mikhail Skobelev
- Arkady Skugarevsky
- Vladimir Vasilyevich Smirnov
- Mikhail Sokovin
- Georg von Stackelberg
- Archduke Stephen of Austria (Palatine of Hungary)
- Hermann von Strantz
- Dejan Subotić
- Vladimir Sukhomlinov
- Felix Sumarokov-Elston
- Sylvester Stankievich
- Ludwig Freiherr von und zu der Tann-Rathsamhausen
- Alexander von Taube
- Arshak Ter-Gukasov
- Nikolai Tretyakov
- Johann Nepomuk von Triva
- Dmitry Troshchinsky
- Erast Tsytovich
- Georgy Tumanov
- Fyodor Tyutchev
- Paul Simon Unterberger
- Prince Valdemar of Denmark
- Sergei Vasilchikov
- Georgy Vasmund
- Nikolai Velyaminov
- Anthony Veselovsky
- Robert Viren
- Grand Duke Vladimir Alexandrovich of Russia
- Grand Duke Vladimir Kirillovich of Russia
- Nikita Volkonsky
- Illarion Vorontsov-Dashkov
- Nikolay Vuich
- Alfred von Waldersee
- Arthur Wellesley, 1st Duke of Wellington
- Wilhelm II, German Emperor
- William I, German Emperor
- William II of Württemberg
- Sergei Witte
- Ludwig von Wolzogen
- Duke Eugen of Württemberg (1788–1857)
- Sir James Wylie, 1st Baronet
- Nikolai Yanushkevich
- Aleksey Petrovich Yermolov
- Nikolai Yudenich
- Pavel Zelenoy
- Ferdinand von Zeppelin
- Arthur Zimmermann
- August zu Eulenburg
- Dmitry Zuyev
- Alexander Pietrov

2nd Class

- Alois Lexa von Aehrenthal
- Ilyas bey Aghalarov
- Akiyama Yoshifuru
- Harold Alexander, 1st Earl Alexander of Tunis
- Alexei Arbuzov (general)
- Alfred, 2nd Prince of Montenuovo
- Władysław Anders
- Nikolai Anderson
- Ivane Andronikashvili
- Dmitry Anuchin
- Christophor Araratov
- Pavel Argeyev
- Arsen of Tbilisi
- Pyotr Romanovich Bagration
- Jaques Bagratuni
- Nikolai Baratov
- Vasily Baumgarten
- John Charles Beckwith (British Army officer)
- Daniel Bek-Pirumian
- Sergey Vasilyevich Belyaev
- Mikhail Berens
- Vasily Berkov
- Albrecht Besserer von Thalfingen
- Vasily Biskupsky
- Herbert von Bismarck
- Wilhelm von Bismarck
- Georgy Bobrikov
- Nikolai Bobyr
- Woldemar von Boeckmann
- Petro Bolbochan
- Vasily Boldyrev
- Julius von Bose
- Eugene Botkin
- Frīdrihs Briedis
- Constantin Cantacuzino (died 1877)
- Leo von Caprivi
- Mateiu Caragiale
- Alexandru Cernat
- Alexander Chechenskiy
- Grigori Chernozubov
- Seraphim Chichagov
- Grigory Choglokov
- Sophus Christensen
- Peter Christophersen
- Nicolae Ciupercă
- Arthur Clifton
- Norman Coates
- Duke Constantine Petrovich of Oldenburg
- Francis Cromie
- Nikolai Dimitrievich Dabić
- Alexander Lvovich Davydov
- Evgraf Davydov
- Anton Denikin
- Mikhail Diterikhs
- Dmitry Petrovich Dokhturov
- Vasily Andreyevich Dolgorukov
- Ivan Alekseevich Dwigubski
- Alfred Mordaunt Egerton
- William George Keith Elphinstone
- Ivan Fyodorovich Emme
- Oskar Enqvist
- Nikolai Epanchin
- Ludwig von Falkenhausen
- Alexey Favorsky
- Thomas Fellowes (Royal Navy officer, born 1778)
- Frederick Field (Royal Navy officer)
- Vladimir Nikolayevich Filipov
- Carl Andreas Fougstad
- Ivan Fullon
- Ivan Ganetsky
- Robert Gardiner (British Army officer)
- Vasily Gavrilov
- Alexander Gertsyk
- Webb Gillman
- Vladimir Gittis
- Andrey Glebov
- Fyodor Gogel
- William Maynard Gomm
- Vladimir Gorbatovsky
- Mikhail Dmitrievich Gorchakov
- Pyotr Gorlov
- James Grierson
- Erich von Gündell
- Vasily Gurko
- Hovhannes Hakhverdyan
- Karl Eberhard Herwarth von Bittenfeld
- Max Horton
- Dmitry Horvat
- Reginald Hoskins
- John Hobart Caradoc, 2nd Baron Howden
- Dietrich von Hülsen-Haeseler
- Alexander Ievreinov
- Nikolay Ilminsky
- Karl Jessen
- Alexander Kazakov
- Mikhail Khilkov
- Boris Khreschatitsky
- Alexander Khristiani
- Friedrich von Kielmansegg
- Hugo W. Koehler
- Roman Kondratenko
- August Kork
- Lavr Kornilov
- Apostol Kostanda
- Stiliyan Kovachev
- Sergey Kravkov (agronomist)
- Vasily Kravkov
- Alexander J. Kravtsov
- Petr G. Kravtsov
- Aleksandr Krymov
- Julius Kuperjanov
- Aglay Dmitriyevich Kuzmin-Korovaev
- Vladimir Kuzmin-Karavayev
- Johan Laidoner
- Sergey Stepanovich Lanskoy
- Hans Leesment
- Alexander Mikhailovich Lermontov
- Alexander Karl Nikolai von Lieven
- Antoni Listowski
- Walter von Loë
- George Bingham, 3rd Earl of Lucan
- Fedir Lyzohub
- Pavel Maksutov
- Safarbek Malsagov
- Carl Gustaf Emil Mannerheim
- Vladimir May-Mayevsky
- Leonid Maykov
- Karim bey Mehmandarov
- Emmanuel von Mensdorff-Pouilly
- Mikhail Mirkovich
- Ernst von Mohl
- Stefan Mokrzecki
- Theodor Molien
- Dmitry Nadyozhny
- Tovmas Nazarbekian
- Vasily Nezabitovsky
- Alexander Nikolaevich Volzhin
- Amos Norcott
- Vasily Fedorovich Novitsky
- Nikolai Obolensky
- Ilia Odishelidze
- David Ivanovich Orlov
- Ivan Ozerov
- Dmitri Parsky
- Anatoly Pepelyayev
- Pavel Pereleshin
- Vasily Perfilyev
- Adolph Pfingsten
- Dmitry Pikhno
- Karl von Plettenberg
- Alexander Stepanovich Popov
- Kazimierz Porębski
- Ignacy Prądzyński
- Mikhail Promtov
- Amanullah Mirza Qajar
- Fyodor Radetsky
- Evgeny Aleksandrovich Radkevich
- Antoni Wilhelm Radziwiłł
- Wilhelm von Ramming
- Kirill Razumovski
- Aleksandr Vladimirovich Razvozov
- Paul von Rennenkampf
- Pyotr Ivanovich Ricord
- Christopher Roop
- Hew Dalrymple Ross
- Carlo Rossi (architect)
- Zinovy Rozhestvensky
- Friedrich von Rüdiger
- Adam Rzhevusky
- Vladimir Saitov
- Vladimir Viktorovich Sakharov
- Pavel Savvich
- Pavel Schilling
- Yakov Schkinsky
- Ioan Axente Sever
- Boris Shaposhnikov
- Aliagha Shikhlinski
- Sergey I. Shivtzov
- Fyodor Shubin
- Volodymyr Sikevych
- Alexander Sirotkin
- Boris Skibine
- Pavlo Skoropadskyi
- Jan Zygmunt Skrzynecki
- Vladimir Vasilyevich Smirnov
- Mikhail Sokovin
- Christian von Steven
- Sylvester Stankievich
- Pavel Sytin
- Pyotr Telezhnikov
- Robert Richard Torrens
- Robert Torrens (British Army officer)
- Richard M. Trevethan
- Charles Lawrence, 2nd Baron Trevethin
- Ivan Trutnev
- Erast Tsytovich
- Mikhail Tukhachevsky
- Georgy Tumanov
- Eustachy Tyszkiewicz
- Konstantin Vakulovsky
- Sergei Vasilchikov
- Georgy Vasmund
- Julius von Verdy du Vernois
- Vladimir Vernadsky
- Grigory Verzhbitsky
- Anthony Veselovsky
- Wilgelm Vitgeft
- Vladimir Vitkovsky
- John Waters (British Army officer, born 1774)
- Stanley Price Weir
- Alfred Welby
- Constantin Westchiloff
- Sergei Wojciechowski
- Lucjan Żeligowski
- Silvestras Žukauskas

3rd Class

- Adrian Nepenin
- Alexander Afanasyev
- Ilyas bey Aghalarov
- Prince Albert of Saxe-Altenburg
- Ambrozovics Dezső
- Nikolai Anderson
- Vladimir Arsenyev
- Jaques Bagratuni
- Aleksei Baiov
- Andrei Bakich
- Edward Bamford
- Alexander Barclay de Tolly-Weymarn
- Vasily Baumgarten
- Daniel Bek-Pirumian
- Vasily Biskupsky
- Georgy Bobrikov
- Woldemar von Boeckmann
- Petro Bolbochan
- Vasily Boldyrev
- Fyodor Bronnikov
- Jonas Budrys
- Grigori Chernozubov
- Seraphim Chichagov
- Grigory Choglokov
- Christopher Courtney
- Nikolai Dimitrievich Dabić
- Hubert Edward Dannreuther
- Alexander Alexandrovich Dushkevich
- Harold Elliott
- Nikolai Epanchin
- Gunther von Etzel
- Sergei Fyodorov
- Nikolai Filatov
- Vladimir Nikolayevich Filipov
- Vasily Flug
- Lev Galler
- Ivan Ganetsky
- Hamilton Gault
- Alexander Gertsyk
- Michael Lapinsky
- Vladimir Gorbatovsky
- Hovhannes Hakhverdyan
- John Hearson
- Dmitry Horvat
- Oleksander Hrekov
- Karol Hutten-Czapski
- Alexander Ievreinov
- Nikolai Ignatev
- Arnolds Indriksons
- Platon Ioseliani
- Anton Irv
- Ismayil bek Kutkashensky
- Leonard Jaczewski
- Alan Jerrard
- Jonas Juška
- Alexey Kaledin
- Kyprian Kandratovich
- Vladimir Kappel
- Dmitry Karbyshev
- Boris Khreschatitsky
- Alexander Khristiani
- Konstantinas Kleščinskis
- Nikolai Kolomeitsev
- August Kork
- Nikolai Kravkov
- Vasily Kravkov
- Alexander J. Kravtsov
- Petr G. Kravtsov
- Julius Kuperjanov
- Ants Kurvits
- Aglay Dmitriyevich Kuzmin-Korovaev
- Vladimir Kuzmin-Karavayev
- Hans Leesment
- Leonid Lesh
- Alexander Mikhailovich Lermontov
- Nikolai Linevich
- Antoni Listowski
- Ivan Loiko
- Einar Lundborg
- Donat Makijonek
- Safarbek Malsagov
- Karim bey Mehmandarov
- Feofil Egorovich Meyendorf
- Alfred Meyer-Waldeck
- Sergei Mezheninov
- Ivan Vladimirovich Michurin
- Mikhail Mirkovich
- Syla Mishchenko
- Stefan Mokrzecki
- Dmitry Nadyozhny
- Jan Nagórski
- Jafargulu Khan Nakhchivanski
- Jamshid Nakhchivanski
- Tovmas Nazarbekian
- Danail Nikolaev
- Vasily Fedorovich Novitsky
- Nikolai Obolensky
- Vladimir Olderogge
- Alexey Fyodorovich Orlov
- David Ivanovich Orlov
- Vasily Perfilyev
- Mikhail Mikhailovich Pleshkov
- Georgy Polkovnikov
- Peter Polovtsov
- Alexander Stepanovich Popov
- Mikhail Promtov
- Feyzullah Mirza Qajar
- Fyodor Radetsky
- Evgeny Aleksandrovich Radkevich
- Alexander Ragoza
- Yuri Rall
- Kirill Razumovski
- Alexander Rodzyanko
- Friedrich von Rüdiger
- Carl Rustad
- Adam Rzhevusky
- Vladimir Saitov
- Vladimir Viktorovich Sakharov
- Victor Zaharevich Savelyev
- Pavel Savvich
- Sergei Sheydeman
- Yakov Schkinsky
- Shafi Khan Qajar
- Rodion Shchedrin
- Dmitry Shcherbinovsky
- Pyotr Shchetinkin
- Aliagha Shikhlinski
- Javad khan Shirvanski
- Volodymyr Sikevych
- Alexander Sirotkin
- Boris Skibine
- Arkady Skugarevsky
- Ivan Smirnov (aviator)
- Vladimir Vasilyevich Smirnov
- Mikhail Sokovin
- Viktor Spiridonov
- Georgy Stepanov
- Mykola Stsiborskyi
- Sylvester Stankievich
- Pavel Sytin
- Marceli Tarczewski
- Alexander von Taube
- Vasily Tchernetzov
- Pyotr Telezhnikov
- Valentin Ternavtsev
- Vyacheslav Tkachov
- Fyodor Tolbukhin
- John Tovey, 1st Baron Tovey
- Hugh Trenchard, 1st Viscount Trenchard
- Vyacheslav Troyanov
- Ivan Trutnev
- Konstantin Tsiolkovsky
- Georgy Tumanov
- Leonid Ustrugov
- Konstantin Vakulovsky
- Sergei Vasilchikov
- Georgy Vasmund
- Vladimir Vitkovsky
- Tom Webb-Bowen
- Pyotr Wrangel
- Ivan Iosifovich Yakubovsky
- Alexander Zelenoy
- Mikhail Zoshchenko
- Silvestras Žukauskas

4th Class

- Mikhail Alafuso
- Alexei Arbuzov (general)
- Tarlan Aliyarbayov
- Vladimir Arsenyev
- Jaques Bagratuni
- Alexander Barclay de Tolly-Weymarn
- Mikhail Batorsky
- Daniel Bek-Pirumian
- Vasily Biskupsky
- Petro Bolbochan
- Seraphim Chichagov
- Nikolai Epanchin
- Ivan Fullon
- Yury Gilsher
- Hovhannes Hakhverdyan
- Arnolds Indriksons
- Ismayil bek Kutkashensky
- Aleksander Jaakson
- Mykola Kapustiansky
- Valentin Kataev
- Boris Khreschatitsky
- Konstantinas Kleščinskis
- Nikolay Kokorin
- Konstantin Poltoratsky
- August Kork
- Sergey Kravkov (explorer)
- Alexander J. Kravtsov
- Yevgraf Kruten
- Julius Kuperjanov
- Ants Kurvits
- Johan Laidoner
- Ernst Leman
- Ivan Loiko
- Donat Makijonek
- Safarbek Malsagov
- Evgeny Messner
- Sergei Mezheninov
- Aleksandr Mirkovich
- Syla Mishchenko
- Sava Mutkurov
- Jan Nagórski
- Jamshid Nakhchivanski
- Vladimir Nikolayevich Nikitin
- Garegin Nzhdeh
- David Ivanovich Orlov
- Ivan Orlov (aviator)
- Aleksandr Pishvanov
- Georgy Polkovnikov
- Feyzullah Mirza Qajar
- Alexander Ragoza
- Yuri Rall
- Kirill Razumovski
- Aleksandr Vladimirovich Razvozov
- Alfred Saalwächter
- Mikhail Safonov (pilot)
- Pavel Savvich
- Sergei Sheydeman
- Yakov Schkinsky
- Alexander Sedyakin
- Aliagha Shikhlinski
- Fyodor Shubin
- Volodymyr Sikevych
- Alexander Sirotkin
- Georgy Stepanov
- Vladimir Strzhizhevsky
- Mykola Stsiborskyi
- Jan Syrový
- Pavel Sytin
- Vasily Tchernetzov
- Leo Tolstoy
- Vyacheslav Troyanov
- Konstantin Vakulovsky
- Johannes Vares
- Vladimir Vitkovsky
- Vasili Yanchenko
- Mikhail Zoshchenko
- Silvestras Žukauskas
- Dmitry Zuyev
- Franciszek Żwirko

Other or Unknown Classes

- James Hamilton, 2nd Duke of Abercorn
- Prince Adarnase of Kartli
- Duke Adolf Friedrich of Mecklenburg
- David Murray Anderson
- John Asser
- Sir John Baddeley, 1st Baronet
- Poghos Bek-Pirumyan
- Francis Walter Belt
- Jacques Bergeret
- Pavel Bermondt-Avalov
- Andrew Bertie
- Peter von Bilderling
- Friedrich Wilhelm von Bismarck
- Afrikan P. Bogaewsky
- Adolf von Bonin
- Leimistin Broussan
- Alexander Romanovich Bruce
- Ernesto Burzagli
- Hayk Bzhishkyan
- Nicolae Condeescu
- Adam Kazimierz Czartoryski
- Xawery Czernicki
- Jan Henryk Dąbrowski
- Nicolae Dăscălescu
- Guy Dawnay (British Army officer)
- Léon de Witte de Haelen
- Radko Dimitriev
- Alexander Ivanovich Dmitriev-Mamonov
- Dmitry Bagration-Imeretinsky
- Franciszek Ksawery Drucki-Lubecki
- Henri du Couëdic de Kerérant
- John Lambton, 1st Earl of Durham
- Johann Dzierzon
- Harold Edwards (RCAF officer)
- Felix Funke
- Alexander V. Golubintzev
- Ernest Goüin
- Władysław Gurowski
- Thomas Noel Harris
- Helen Scott Hay
- Philip, Landgrave of Hesse-Homburg
- Carl von Hoffman
- David Edward Hughes
- Edgar Erskine Hume
- Prince Levan of Georgia
- John Paul Jones
- Karađorđe
- Nikolai Kashirin
- Aleksey Khovansky (publisher)
- Aleksey Korin
- Vladimir Kossogovsky
- Jan Kozietulski
- Alexey V. Kravtsov
- Mikhail Krechetnikov
- Alexey Kurakin
- Jacques-Joachim Trotti, marquis de La Chétardie
- Lev Lagorio
- Maksud Alikhanov
- Guglielmo Marconi
- Lucy Minnigerode
- Hugh Henry Mitchell
- Vincent Barkly Molteno
- Auguste de Montferrand
- Joachim Joseph André Murat
- Ludwik Narbutt
- Joseph Cornelius O'Rourke
- Mārtiņš Peniķis
- Constantin Poenaru
- Sir John Pollock, 4th Baronet
- Dighton Probyn
- Mohammad Taqi Mirza Rokn ed-Dowleh
- Eric Gascoigne Robinson
- Roman Vorontsov
- Alexey Schastny
- Fyodor Schechtel
- Alexei Senyavin
- Andrei Shkuro
- Boris Shteifon
- Josip Šokčević
- Constantin Stamati
- Curt von Stedingk
- Dmitry Strukov
- Jerzy Świrski
- Stanisław Tatar
- Samuel Hoare, 1st Viscount Templewood
- Constantin von Tischendorf
- Tomkyns Hilgrove Turner
- Haim Aharon Valero
- Albert Vizentini
- Ivan Illarionovich Vorontsov
- Baldwin Wake Walker
- Eric Sherbrooke Walker
- Nikolay Yung
- Nikanor Zakhvatayev
- Mikhail Zasulich
- Yakov Zhilinsky
- Theodoor Johan Arnold van Zijll de Jong
- Asad-bey Talyshkhanov

== Bibliography ==
- Alan W. Hazelton, The Russian Imperial Orders; New York: The American Numismatic Society, 1932 (Numismatic Notes and Monograms, No. 51).
- Guy Stair Sainty (ed.) World Orders of Knighthood and Merit London: Burke's Peerage, 2006.
