= 9th Cavalry Division (Russian Empire) =

- 9-я кавалерийская дивизия
- Active: 1914–1918
- Country: Russian Empire
- Branch: Russian Imperial Army
- Role: Cavalry

The 9th Cavalry Division (Russian: 9-я кавалерийская дивизия, 9-ya Kavaleriiskaya Diviziya) was a cavalry formation of the Russian Imperial Army.

== Organization ==
- 1st Cavalry Brigade
  - 9th Regiment of Dragoons
  - 9th Uhlan Regiment
- 2nd Cavalry Brigade
  - 9th Regiment of Hussars
  - 9th Regiment of Cossacks
- 9th Horse Artillery Division

== Commanders of the 2nd Brigade ==
- 1877–1878: Grigorij Fedorovitch Tchernozubov
- 1878: Alexander Mikhailovich Lermontov
- 1912: Abram Dragomirov
