= Sergei Vasilchikov =

Imperial Russian division commander

Sergei Illarionovich Vasilchikov
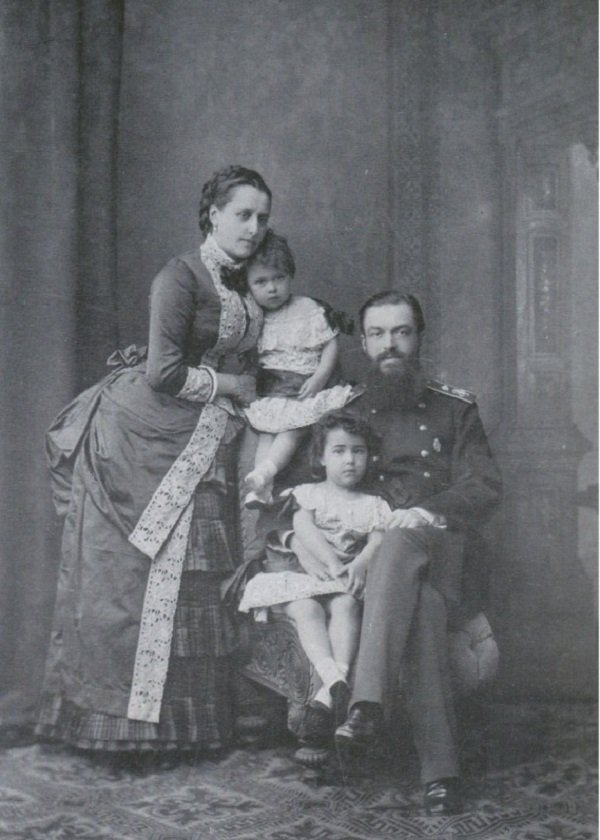
- Prince Sergei Illarionovich Vasilchikov (1849-1926), with his wife Maria Nikolaevna (1853-1922; ur. Isakov) and children - Illarion (1881-1969) and Sophia (1879-1927).
- Born: 9 September 1849; Kiev, Russian Empire
- Died: 27 August 1926 (aged 76); Versailles, Yvelines, France
- Military career
- Allegiance: Russian Empire
- Branch: Imperial Russian Army
- Rank: General of the cavalry
- Commands: 2nd Brigade, 2nd Guards Cavalry Division; 12th Cavalry Division; 1st Cavalry Division; 1st Guards Corps (Russian Empire)
- Conflicts: Russo-Turkish War

Sergei Illarionovich Vasilchikov (9 September 1849 – 27 August 1926) was an Imperial Russian division commander.He was born in Kiev in modern-day Ukraine. He was the son of Imperial Russian general Illarion Illarionovich Vasilchikov. He fought in the war against the Ottoman Empire. He was promoted to major general in 1891 and lieutenant general in 1899. He was the father of Hilarion Vassilchikov. After the October Revolution, he went into exile.

== Awards ==
- Order of Saint Anna, 3rd class, 1874
- Order of Saint Stanislaus (House of Romanov), 2nd class, 1877
- Order of Saint Anna, 2nd class, 1878
- Order of Saint Vladimir, 4th class
- Order of Saint Vladimir, 3rd class, 1888
- Order of Saint Stanislaus (House of Romanov), 1st class, 1894
- Order of Saint Anna, 1st class, 1896
- Order of Saint Vladimir, 2nd class, 1904
- Order of the White Eagle (Russian Empire), 1906
- Order of Saint Alexander Nevsky, 1913

Preceded by	Commander of the 2nd Brigade, 2nd Guards Cavalry Division; 1896–1898	Succeeded by
Preceded by David Ivanovich Orlov	Commander of the 12th Cavalry Division; 1898–1899	Succeeded by
Preceded by	Commander of the 1st Cavalry Division; 1899–1901	Succeeded by
Preceded by Grand Duke Paul Alexandrovich of Russia	Commander of the 1st Guards Corps; 1902-1906	Succeeded by Vladimir Danilov

== Sources ==
- Большая Российская энциклопедия:В 30т./Председатель науч.-ред. совета Ю. С. Осипов. Отв. ред. С. Л. Кравец. Т4. Большой Кавказ—Великий канал. — М.:Большая Российская энциклопедия, 2006. 751с.:ил.:карт. — С.649. (ISBN 978-5-85270-333-0 (Т.4)
- Волков С. В. Офицеры российской гвардии:опыт мартиролога. — М.:Русский путь, 2002. — 568 с. — С.91 (ISBN 978-5-85887-122-4)
- Биография на сайте «Русская императорская армия»
- "Sergei Vasilchikov" (in Russian). «Russian army in a Great war» project.
