= Aleksei Baiov =

Russian and Soviet general (1871–1935)

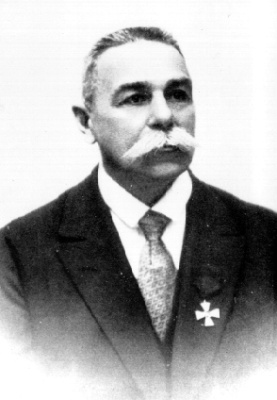
- Born: February 8, 1871; Uman, Ukraine, Russian Empire
- Died: May 8, 1935 (aged 64) Tallinn, Estonia
- Allegiance: Russian Empire; Russian Soviet Federative Socialist Republic; White movement Estonia
- Branch: Imperial Russian Army; Red Army; White Army; Estonian Army
- Service years: 1888–1917 (Russian Empire); 1918–1919 (Bolsheviks); 1919–1920 (White movement); 1920–1926 (Estonia)
- Rank: lieutenant general
- Commands: 42nd Infantry Division; 50th Army Corps; 2nd Army

Aleksei Baiov (February 8, 1871 – May 8, 1935) was an Imperial Russian division, corps and army commander. He was born in present-day Ukraine. He was made a Poruchik in 1894, a Stabskapitän in 1896, a Podpolkovnik (lieutenant colonel) in 1900, a Polkovnik (colonel) in 1905 and a major general in 1911. After the October Revolution, he briefly sided with the Bolsheviks before turning against them.

== Awards ==
- Order of Saint Stanislaus (House of Romanov), 3rd class, 1898
- Order of Saint Anna, 3rd class, 1905
- Order of Saint Stanislaus (House of Romanov), 2nd class, 1908
- Order of Saint Vladimir, 3rd class, 1912
- Order of Saint Vladimir, 3rd class with swords (November 19, 1914)
- Order of Saint Stanislaus (House of Romanov), 1st class (November 19, 1914)
- Gold Sword for Bravery (Saint George Sword) (February 24, 1915)
- The highest gratitude "for writings incurred the Tsar approved the Commission on organization of the celebration of 200 anniversary of victory of the Gangut" (March 16, 1915)
- Order of Saint Anna, 1st class (March 20, 1915)
- Order of Saint George, 4th degree (September 9, 1915)

== Works ==
- Leib-guards Jäger Regiment. Historical reminder for lower ranks. 1893
- Memo on tactics for non-commissioned officers Corps.
- Checklist for topographies for non-commissioned officers Corps.
- Military-geographical and statistical description of northern Korea. 1903
- Orders for Munnich 1736 – 1738 years. 1904
- The Russian army during the reign of IMP. Anna Ioannovna. The war of Russia with Turkey in 1736–1739, t. 1–2, St. Petersburg. 1906; Tom. 1. volume 2.
- A history of Russian martial art, 1–7, St. Petersburg. 1909-13:
- History of the Russian army, 1, St. 1912;
- History of martial arts as science, St. Petersburg. 1912
- Russia's contribution to the victory of the allies. 1924
- The origins of the great world of drama and its directors. 1927

Preceded by	Commander of the 42nd Infantry Division; April–June 1917	Succeeded by
Preceded by Nikolai Danilov	Commander of the 2nd Army; November 20 – December 24, 1917	Succeeded by A. Kiseylov

== Bibliography ==
- Незабытые могилы. Русское зарубежье: некрологи 1917–1999.// В 6 т. 8 книгах, под ред. В. Н. Чувакова. М. «Пашков Дом». 1999. т.1. «А-В». стр. 176.

== Sources ==
- Р. Абисогомян. Приложение к магистерск. диссертации Р.Абисогомяна «Роль русских военных деятелей в общественно и культурной жизни в Эстонской Республике в 1920—1930 гг. и их литературное наследие. Биографический справочник». Тарту. 2007.
- Эстонский сайт георгиевских кавалеров
