= Georgy Bobrikov =

Imperial Russian division commander

Georgy Ivanovich Bobrikov
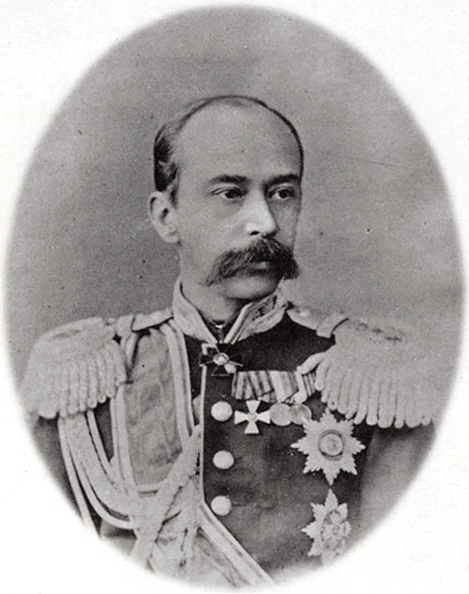
- Born: August 4, 1840; Saint Petersburg, Russian Empire
- Died: December 26, 1924 (aged 84) Switzerland
- Allegiance: Russian Empire
- Branch: Imperial Russian Army
- Commands: 1st Guards Infantry Division
- Conflicts: Russo-Turkish War

Georgy Ivanovich Bobrikov (Russian: Гео́ргий Ива́нович Бо́бриков, 1840 - 1924) was an Imperial Russian division commander. He was the brother of Nikolay Bobrikov. He had another brother, Ivan (1835-1880). He fought in World War I against the Ottoman Empire. After the October Revolution of November 1917, he emigrated to Switzerland.

== Awards ==
- Order of Saint Anna, 3rd class, 1868
- Order of Saint Stanislaus (House of Romanov), 2nd class, 1870
- Order of Saint Vladimir, 4th class, 1871
- Order of Saint Anna, 2nd class, 1874
- Order of Saint Vladimir, 3rd class, 1876
- Gold Sword for Bravery, 1877
- Order of Saint George, 1878
- Order of Saint Stanislaus (House of Romanov), 1st class, 1880
- Order of Saint Anna, 1st class, 1883
- Order of Saint Vladimir, 2nd class, 1886
- Order of the White Eagle (Russian Empire), 1891
- Order of Saint Alexander Nevsky, 1898
- Order of Saint Vladimir, 1st class, 1910

Preceded by Georgy Vasmund	Commander of the 1st Guards Infantry Division; 1898-1901	Succeeded by
