= Aglay Kuzmin-Korovaev =

Imperial Russian military officer

- Born: Aglay Dmitriyevich Kuzmin-Korovaev; 23 May 1864
- Died: 1918 (aged 53 or 54)
- Allegiance: Russian Empire
- Branch: Imperial Russian Army
- Commands: 1st Brigade, 5th Cavalry Division; 1st Don Cossack Division

Aglay Dmitriyevich Kuzmin-Korovaev (23 May 1864 – 1918) was an Imperial Russian lieutenant general and division commander. He was the younger brother of Vladimir Kuzmin-Karavayev.

== Awards ==
- Order of Saint Stanislaus (House of Romanov), 3rd class, 1895
- Order of Saint Anna, 3rd class, 1899
- Order of Saint Stanislaus (House of Romanov), 2nd class, 1903
- Order of Saint Anna, 2nd class, 1906
- Order of Saint Vladimir, 3rd class, 1909
- Order of Saint Stanislaus (House of Romanov), 1st class, 1912
- Order of Saint Anna, 1st class, 1915
- Order of Saint Anna, 1st class with swords, 1916

Preceded by	Commander of the 1st Brigade, 5th Cavalry Division; 1910-1914	Succeeded by
Preceded by Aleksei Lvovich Vershinin	Commander of the 1st Don Cossack Division; July–August 1914	Succeeded by Grigory Ivanovich Choglokov

== Bibliography ==
- Семь веков служат отечеству. Старинный род Кузьминых-Караваевых // Источник, No.5, 1995.

== Sources ==
- "Aglay Kuzmin-Korovaev" (in Russian). «Russian army in a Great war» project.
- Фрейман О. Р. Пажи за 183 года (1711–1894). Биографии бывших пажей с портретами. — Фридрихсгамн, 1894. — С. 711.
