= Fyodor Shubin =

Russian military officer (1783–1832)

Fyodor Kuzmich Shubin II
- Born: 1783
- Died: 1832 (aged 48–49)
- Allegiance: Russian Empire
- Branch: Imperial Russian Army
- Rank: Colonel
- Conflicts: Napoleonic Wars; French invasion of Russia
- Awards: Order of St. Anna, 4th class Order of St. Anna, 2nd class Order of St. Vladimir, 4th class

Fyodor Kuzmich Shubin II (Russian: Федор Кузьмич Шубин-второй; 1783 – 1832) was a military intelligence officer, explorer, and Colonel in the Imperial Russian Army during Napoleonic Wars.

At the age of 16, as he was born into a noble family, he became a sub-lieutenant through the cadet corps system.

At the age of 47, in 1830, he founded the Akmola fortress (now Astana).
