= 5th Cavalry Division (Russian Empire) =

- 5-я кавалерийская дивизия
- Active: 1875–1918
- Country: Russian Empire
- Branch: Russian Imperial Army
- Role: Cavalry
- Engagements: World War I; Battle of the Vistula River

The 5th Cavalry Division (Russian: 5-я кавалерийская дивизия, 5-ya Kavaleriiskaya Diviziya) was a cavalry formation of the Russian Imperial Army.

== Organization ==
- 1st Cavalry Brigade
  - Kargopol 5th Regiment of Dragoons
  - Lithuanian 5th Uhlan Regiment
- 2nd Cavalry Brigade
  - Alexandrian 5th Regiment of Hussars
  - 5th Regiment of Don Cossacks
- 5th Horse Artillery Battalion

== Commanders of the 1st Brigade ==
- 1910–1914: Aglay Dmitriyevich Kuzmin-Korovaev
