= Pavel Savvich =

Imperial Russian regimental, division and corps commander

Pavel Sergeyevich Savvich
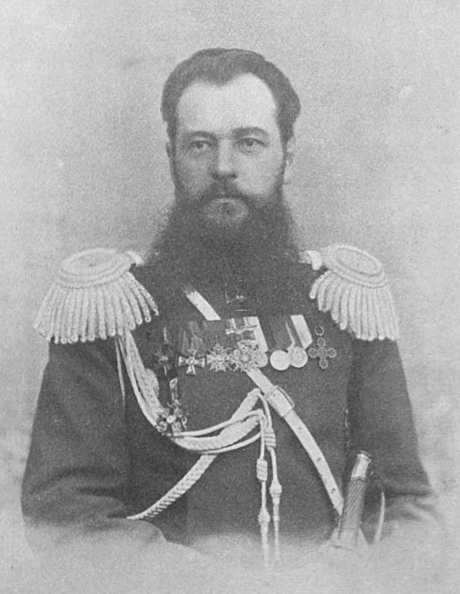
- Born: 15 February 1857
- Died: 1917 (aged 59–60)
- Allegiance: Russian Empire
- Branch: Imperial Russian Army
- Commands: 134th Infantry Regiment; 124th Infantry Regiment; 45th Infantry Division; 25th Infantry Division; 5th Siberian Army Corps
- Battles / wars: Russo-Turkish War

Pavel Sergeyevich Savvich (Russian, Павел Сергеевич Саввич, 15 February 1857 – 1917) was an Imperial Russian regimental, division and corps commander. He served twice as governor of Kiev Governorate in modern-day Ukraine.

== Biography ==
Pavel Sergeievich Savvich comes from a Russian line of nobles of the Kharkov province.The younger brothers Alexander and Sergei were also generals.

Baptized in the Russian Orthodox Church, Pavel completed his high school education in Kharkov and graduated from the Vladimir Kiev Cadet Corps (1873) and the Mikhailovsky Artillery School (1876), from where he was released as a second lieutenant in the 31st Artillery Brigade. He was consequently elevated to the ranks of lieutenant (1877), staff captain (1880), captain (1883), lieutenant colonel (1887), colonel (for distinction, 1891), major general (1900), lieutenant general (for distinction, 1907), general of infantry (for distinction, 1913).

Pavel took part in the Russian-Turkish war of 1877–1878, including the capture of the Nikopol fortress, the battle of Plevna and in the transition of the Balkans with General Iosif Gurko. For military distinctions and valor he was awarded a number of orders.

After graduating from the Nikolaev Academy of the General Staff in the 1st category in 1883, he was senior adjutant of the headquarters of the 10th Cavalry Division (1883–1884), chief officer for special assignments at the headquarters of the 10th Army Corps (1884–1887), senior adjutant of the headquarters of the Kharkov Military District (1887–1889) and, finally, staff officer for special assignments at the headquarters of the 10th Army Corps (1889–1894).

Then he was chief of staff of the 10th Cavalry Division (1894–1899), commander of the 134th Feodosian Infantry (1899–1900) and 124th Voronezh Infantry (1900) regiments. On December 12, 1900, for distinction, he was promoted to major general and appointed general for special assignments under the commander of the Kyiv Military District. In 1902, he was appointed district duty general of the Kyiv Military District headquarters.

On 7 September 1903, he was appointed governor of Kyiv. On8 October 1905, he was transferred to the same position in the Kostroma Oblast, but on 2 November without taking over the administration of the latter, he was returned to the post of Kyiv governor. In 1906 he was appointed chief of staff of the Irkutsk Military District. Then he was the head of the 45th Infantry (1908–1910) and 25th Infantry (1910–1911) divisions, commander of the 5th Siberian Army Corps (1911–1913).

On 28 December 1913, Pavel was appointed a member of the Military Council. On 22 September 1917, he was put on medical leave, but he died shortly after.

== Awards ==
- Order of Saint Anna, 4th class, 1877
- Order of Saint Stanislaus (House of Romanov), 3rd class, 1878
- Order of Saint Anna, 3rd class, 1879
- Order of Saint Stanislaus (House of Romanov), 2nd class, 1879
- Order of Saint Anna, 2nd class, 1885
- Order of Saint Vladimir, 4th class, 1894
- Order of Saint Vladimir, 3rd class, 1896
- Order of Saint Stanislaus (House of Romanov), 1st class, 1902
- Order of Saint Anna, 1st class, 1907
- Order of Saint Vladimir, 2nd class, 1911
- Order of the White Eagle (Russian Empire), 1914

Preceded by	Commander of the 134th Infantry Regiment; 1899–1900	Succeeded by
Preceded by	Commander of the 124th Infantry Regiment; 1900	Succeeded by
Preceded by Fyodor Trepov	Governor of Kiev Governorate; 1903–1905	Succeeded by Aleksandr Vatatsi
Preceded by Aleksandr Vatatsi	Governor of Kiev Governorate; 1905–1906	Succeeded by
Preceded by	Commander of the 45th Infantry Division; 1908–1910	Succeeded by
Preceded by	Commander of the 25th Infantry Division; 1910–1911	Succeeded by
Preceded by Nikolai Podvalnyuk	Commander of the 5th Siberian Army Corps; 1911–1913	Succeeded by Arkady Sychevsky
