= Safarbek Malsagov =

Russian general (1868–1944)

- Born: 1868; Vladikavkaz, Terek Oblast, Russian Empire
- Died: 1944; Warsaw, Poland
- Allegiance: Russian Empire
- Service / branch: Imperial Russian Army
- Commands: 1st Brigade, 3rd Caucasus Cossack Division
- Battles / wars: World War I Russian Civil War

Safarbek Tovsultanivich Malsagov (Note: Russian: Сафарбек Товсултанович Мальсагов, Ingush: Малсаганаькъан Товсолтий воӀ Сафарбик, romanized: Malsaganäqhan Tovsoltiy vow Safarbik; patronymic also spelled Tausultanovich (Таусултанович).) (26 July 1868 – 1944) was an Ingush-born Russian general. He was born in what is now the Republic of North Ossetia-Alania. After the end of the Russian Civil War, he went into exile in Poland.

== Awards ==
- Order of Saint Vladimir, 4th class
- Order of Saint Vladimir, 3rd class
- Order of Saint Anna, 1st class
- Order of Saint Anna, 2nd class
- Order of Saint Anna, 3rd class
- Order of Saint Anna, 4th class
- Order of Saint Stanislaus (House of Romanov), 1st class
- Order of Saint Stanislaus (House of Romanov), 2nd class
- Order of Saint Stanislaus (House of Romanov), 3rd class

| Preceded by | Commander of the 1st Brigade, 3rd Caucasus Cossack Division; 1916 | Succeeded by |
