= Nikolai Obolensky =

Imperial Russian division commander

Prince Nikolai Nikolayevich Obolensky
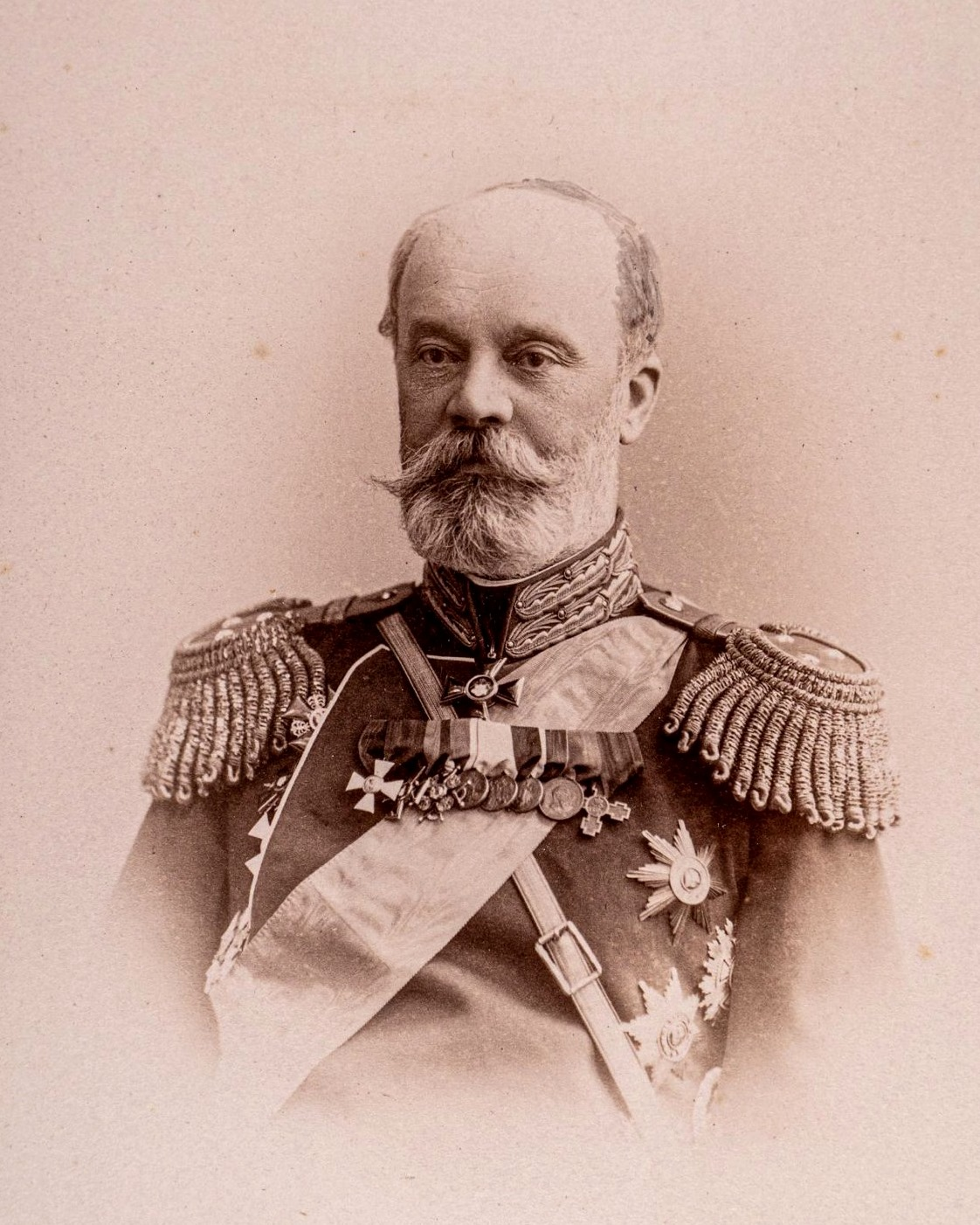
- Born: November 10, 1833 Simbirsk, Russian Empire
- Died: August 25, 1898 (aged 64) Saint Petersburg, Russian Empire
- Allegiance: Saint Petersburg
- Branch: Imperial Russian Army
- Commands: 1st Guards Infantry Division; 1st Guards Corps (Russian Empire)
- Conflicts: Crimean War; January Uprising; Russo-Turkish War

Prince Nikolai Nikolayevich Obolensky (November 10, 1833 – August 25, 1898) was an Imperial Russian division commander. He was born in what is now Ulyanovsk, Ulyanovsk Oblast. He fought in wars in the Crimea, Poland and against the Ottoman Empire. He had two sons, Vladimir and Alexander.

== Awards ==
- Order of Saint Stanislaus (House of Romanov), 3rd class, 1863
- Order of Saint Anna, 3rd class, 1865
- Order of Saint Stanislaus (House of Romanov), 2nd class, 1869
- Order of Saint Vladimir, 4th class, 1872
- Order of Saint Anna, 2nd class, 1875
- Gold Sword for Bravery, 1878
- Order of Saint Vladimir, 3rd class, 1878
- Order of Saint George, 4th degree, 1879
- Order of Saint Stanislaus (House of Romanov), 1st class, 1880
- Order of Saint Anna, 1st class, 1883
- Order of Saint Vladimir, 2nd class, 1886
- Order of the White Eagle (Russian Empire), 1891

== Sources ==
- Волков С. В. Генералитет Российской империи. Энциклопедический словарь генералов и адмиралов от Петра I до Николая II. Том II. Л—Я. М., 2009
- Исмаилов Э. Э. Золотое оружие с надписью «За храбрость». Списки кавалеров 1788–1913. М., 2007
- Милорадович Г. А. Список лиц свиты их величеств с царствования императора Петра I по 1886 год. Чернигов, 1886
- Список генералам по старшинству. Составлен по 1 мая 1897 года. СПб., 1896. — С. 189
- Старчевский А. А. Памятник Восточной войны 1877–1878 гг. СПб., 1878

Preceded by Mikhail Pavlovich Danilov	Commander of the 1st Guards Infantry Division; 1889-1897	Succeeded by Oskar Grippenberg
Preceded by	Commander of the 1st Guards Corps; 1897-1898	Succeeded by Grand Duke Paul Alexandrovich of Russia
