= Alexander Khristiani =

Alexander G Khristiani
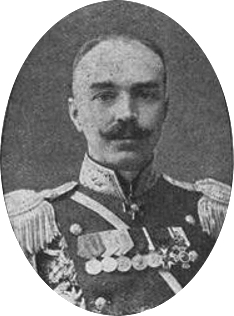
- Born: 22 October 1871
- Died: 1 November 1914 (aged 43)
- Military career
- Allegiance: Russian Empire
- Branch: Imperial Russian Army
- Service years: 1890–1914
- Rank: Polkovnik (colonel)
- Units: Lifeguard Jaeger Regiment; 2nd Guards Infantry Division (Russian Empire); 1st Guards Infantry Division (Russian Empire)
- Conflicts: World War I

Alexander G Khristiani (22 October 1871 – 1 November 1914) was an officer of the Imperial Russian Army in World War I.

== Life and career ==
Alexander Khristiani graduated from the Second Saint Petersburg Gymnasium in 1890 and the 2nd Military Konstantinovsky School in 1892. He exited as a Podporuchik in the Lifeguard Jaeger Regiment.

Ranks: Poruchik (1895), Staff Captain of the Guard with renaming as Captains of the General Staff (1898), Podpolkovnik (1902), Colonel (1907).

In 1898, he graduated from the General Staff Academy (Imperial Russia) with a silver medal (1st category).

He served as senior adjutant to the headquarters of the 2nd Guards Infantry Division (Russian Empire) in 1900 and the 1st Army Corps (Russian Empire) during 1900–1902. In 1900–1901, he served in the censored company command in the Lifeguard Jaeger Regiment. In 1902, he was the Chief Officer for assignments at the headquarters of the troops of the Guard and the Petersburg Military District (Russian Empire).

He served as a Headquarters Officer for special assignments at the Headquarters of the Guards Corps during 1902–1908. In 1906, he served the censored command of the battalion in the Life Guards Rifle Regiment. During 1908–1913, he remained the Chief of the Staff of the 1st Guards Infantry Division.

On 31 July 1913, he was appointed as the Commander of the 199th Kronstadt Infantry Regiment, with which he entered the First World War.

== Martyrdom ==
Khristiani attained martyrdom on 1 November 1914 and was awarded the St. George Sword posthumously in 1915.

“He commanded his regiment in a battle in November 1914. Despite being under strong artillery and rifle fire from the enemy side and being wounded in the arm, he continued to defend them and lead the battle. He led his regiment to counter-attack against the advancing enemy, setting an example of courage and valor to other ranks of the regiment. While attacking for the second time, he became seriously injured and ultimately martyred.”

He was buried in Pavlovsk, Saint Petersburg.

== Awards ==
- Order of Saint Stanislaus (House of Romanov), 3rd Art. (1899)
- Order of St. Anna, 3rd art. (1902);
- Order of Saint Stanislaus (House of Romanov), 2nd art. (1905);
- Order of St. Anna, 2nd art. (1910);
- Order of St. Vladimir 4th art. (1913);
- St. George Sword (posthumously, 18 March 1915)

Preceded by	Chief of Staff of the 1st Guards Infantry Division; 26 February 1908 – 31 July 1913	Succeeded by

== Sources ==
- "Military Order of the Holy Great Martyr and Victorious George. Biobibliographic Reference" RGVIA, M., 2004.
- List of senior military commanders, chiefs of staff: districts, corps, and divisions, and commanders of individual combat units. St. Petersburg. Military Printing House. 1913.
- List of the General Staff. Fixed on 6 January 1914. Petrograd, 1914
- Photo from the weekly supplement to the newspaper "New Time" No. 13908 of 29 November 1914.
- "New time" for 1914. Information provided by Ilya Mukhin (Moscow)
- Russian disabled person. No. 267, 1914 // Information provided by Konstantin Podlessky
- VP for the military department // Scout No. 1279, 5 December 1915
