= Arnolds Indriksons =

Latvian middle-distance runner (1893–1941)

Personal information
- Nationality: Latvian
- Born: 20 August 1893 Riga, Governorate of Livonia, Russian Empire
- Died: 27 June 1941 (aged 47) Butyrka prison, Moscow, Russian SFSR, Soviet Union

Sport
- Sport: Middle-distance running
- Event: 1500 metres

Arnolds Indriksons (20 August 1893 – 27 June 1941) was a Latvian middle-distance runner. He competed in the men's 1500 metres at the 1912 Summer Olympics, representing the Russian Empire.

== Personal life ==
Indriksons served as a captain in the Imperial Russian Army and was wounded once during the First World War and twice during the Russian Civil War. During his service, he was awarded the third and fourth classes of the Order of St. Anna, the Order of St. Stanislaus, and the fourth class of the Order of St. George. In September 1940, after the occupation of Latvia by Soviet forces, Indrikson was arrested and held at Butyrka prison. He was executed by shooting on 27 June 1941.
