= Georgy Tumanov =

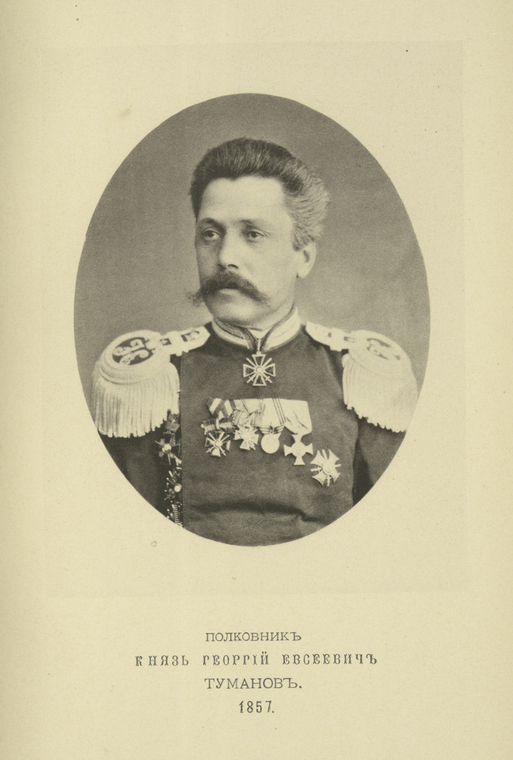
- Born: 16 March 1839
- Died: 30 May 1901 (aged 62)
- Allegiance: Russian Empire
- Branch: Imperial Russian Army
- Rank: General of the Infantry
- Commands: 32nd Infantry Division; 5th Infantry Division
- Conflicts: Caucasian War; Russo-Turkish War

Georgy Tumanov (Russian: Туманов, Георгий Евсеевич, Georgian: გიორგი თუმანიშვილი (Giorgi Tumanishvili), Armenian: Գեորգի Թումանով) (16 March 1839 – 30 May 1901) was member of the Georgian-Armenian royal house of Tumanishvili. He served as General of the Infantry as well as theorist and practitioner of military engineering in the Russian Empire. Tumanov was one of the most important specialists in that area at the time. He wrote numerous manuals for pioneer units on how to properly construct fortifications and other relevant military infrastructure.

== Awards ==
- Order of Saint Anna, 3rd class, 1864
- Order of Saint Vladimir, 4th class, 1864
- Order of Saint Vladimir, 3rd class, 1878
- Order of Saint Stanislaus (House of Romanov), 2nd class, 1865
- Order of Saint Anna, 2nd class, 1874
- Order of Saint Stanislaus (House of Romanov), 1st class, 1891
- Order of Saint Anna, 1st class, 1899

Preceded by	Commander of the 32nd Infantry Division; 1896–1897	Succeeded by
Preceded by	Commander of the 5th Infantry Division; 1897–1901	Succeeded by

== Sources ==
- Некрологи:
  - «Исторический вестник», 1901 г., т. 85, июль
  - «Новое время», 1901 г., № 9075
- Гогитидзе М. Грузинский генералитет (1699—1921). Киев, 2001
