= Sylvester Stankievich =

Imperial Russian corps commander

Sylvester Lvovich Stankievich
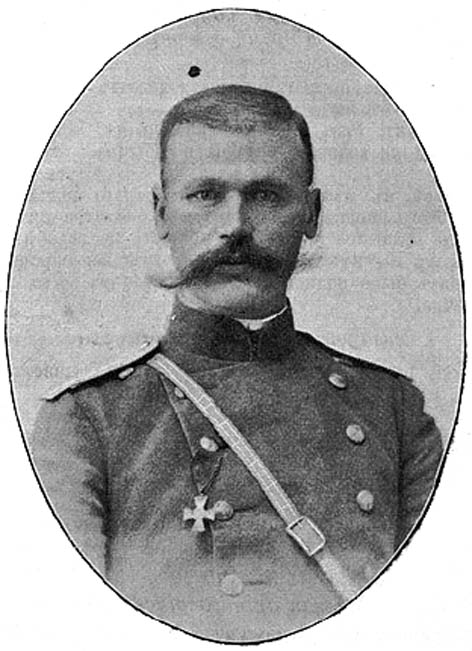
- Born: 31 December 1866
- Died: 11 March 1919 (aged 52) Taganrog
- Allegiance: Russian Empire (Russia) White Movement
- Branch: Imperial Russian Army; Armed Forces of South Russia
- Commands: 2nd Polish Corps
- Conflicts: Boxer Rebellion; Russo-Japanese War; World War I Russian Civil War

Sylvester Lvovich Stankievich (31 December 1866 – 11 March 1919) was a corps commander in the military of the Russian Empire. He fought in the war against the Empire of Japan. After the October Revolution, he fought against the Bolsheviks in the subsequent civil war.

== Awards ==
- Order of Saint George, 4th degree, 1900
- Order of Saint Anna, 3rd class, 1902
- Order of Saint Stanislaus (House of Romanov), 2nd class, 1903
- Order of Saint Anna, 2nd class, 1904
- Order of Saint Vladimir, 4th class, 1904
- Gold Sword for Bravery (February 9, 1907)
- Order of Saint Vladimir, 3rd class, 1913
- Order of Saint Stanislaus (House of Romanov), 1st class (April 5, 1915)
- Order of Saint George, 3rd degree (November 3, 1915)
- Order of Saint Anna, 1st class (May 14, 1916)
- Order of Saint Vladimir, 2nd class (August 23, 1916)
