= 25th Infantry Division (Russian Empire) =

- 25-я пехотная дивизия
- Active: 1914–1918
- Country: Russian Empire
- Branch: Russian Imperial Army
- Role: Infantry

The 25th Infantry Division (Russian: 25-я пехо́тная диви́зия, 25-ya Pekhotnaya Diviziya) was an infantry formation of the Imperial Russian Army. It formed part of the 3rd Army Corps.

== Organization ==
- 1st Brigade
  - 97th Infantry Regiment Livonia (headquarters Dvinsk)
  - 98th Infantry Regiment Yuriev (headquarters Dvinsk)
- 2nd Brigade, (headquarters Dvinsk)
  - 99th Infantry Regiment of Ivangorod (headquarters Dvinsk)
  - 100th Infantry Regiment Ostrovsky (headquarters Dvinsk)
- 25th Artillery Brigade

== Commanders ==
- 08/15/1863 - 1864 - Lieutenant General Babkin, Grigory Danilovich
- until 05.25.1865 - Major General Likhutin, Mikhail Dorimedontovich
- 05.24.1865 - 02.19.1877 - Major General (from 08.30, 1865 Lieutenant General) Samsonov, Gavriil Petrovich
- 02/22/1877 - 04/05/1878 - Major General (from 01/01, 1878 Lieutenant General) Kuzmin, Ilya Alexandrovich
- 04/05/1878 - 01/23/1883 - Major General (from 08/30, 1881 Lieutenant General) Iolshin, Mikhail Alexandrovich
- 02/18/1883 - 03/16/1883 - Lieutenant General Trotsky, Vitaly Nikolaevich
- 03/22/1883 - 07/06/1885 - Lieutenant General Rerberg, Pyotr Fedorovich
- хх.хх.1885 - 08.26.1888 - Lieutenant General Paul, Alexander Petrovich
- 09/29/1888 - 05/29/1891 - Lieutenant General Ofrosimov, Evfimy Yakovlevich
- June 17, 1891 - March 31, 1896 - Lieutenant General Nikolay Turbin
- 04/08/1896 - 09/27/1901 - Major General (from 05/14/1896 Lieutenant General) Baron Osten-Drizen, Nikolai Fedorovich
- 13.10.1901 - 02.08.1906 - Lieutenant General Pnevsky, Vyacheslav Ivanovich
- 08/16/1906 - 11/07/1907 - major general (from 04/22/1907 lieutenant general) Pelzer, Ivan Karlovich
- 11/07/1907 - 05/02/1910 - Lieutenant General Muffel, Vladimir Nikolaevich
- 1910-1911: Pavel Savvich
- 1911-1914: Pavel Bulgakov
- 1915: Mikhail Sokovin

== Chiefs of Staff ==
- 08/30/1863 - after 05/03/1865 - Colonel Afanasyev, Dmitry Fedorovich
- 1866 -? - Lieutenant Colonel Parfyonov, Alexander Demidovich
- earlier 08.02.1869 - until 20.11.1870 - Colonel Dragat, Ludomir Iosifovich
- earlier 03/15/1872 - 11/13/1877 - Colonel Myagkov, Ivan Vasilievich
- 12/14/1877 - 01/07/1886 - Colonel Sunnerberg, Georgy Fedorovich
- 02/07/1886 - 07/03/1889 - Colonel Parutsky, Vasily Ignatievich
- 07/14/1889 - 11/06/1896 - Colonel Nechaev, Nikolai Ivanovich
- 11.22.1896 - 02.24.1900 - Colonel Zegelov, Alexander Alexandrovich
- 04/05/1900 - 03.24.1904 - Colonel Borisov, Vyacheslav Evstafievich
- 03.24.1904 - 07.29.1904 - Colonel Kalachov, Nikolai Khristoforovich
- 09/28/1904 - 05/23/1905 - Colonel Genishta, Vladimir Ivanovich
- 09/03/1905 - 07/04/1914 - lieutenant colonel (from 04/22/1907 colonel) Sokalsky, Ivan Alekseevich
- 09.09.1914 - 06.08.1915 - Colonel Romanovsky, Ivan Pavlovich
- 08/15/1915 - 04/09/1916 - Colonel Plekhanov, Sergei Nikolaevich
- 11/27/1916 - 10/15/1917 - Lieutenant Colonel (from 12/06/1916 Colonel) Vitkovsky, Konstantin Konstantinovich
- 10/26/1917 - etc. Lieutenant Colonel Reut, Alexey Ivanovich
