= Pyotr Telezhnikov =

Russian and Soviet general (1863 - after 1920)

Pyotr Dmitryvich Telezhnikov
- Born: March 31, 1863
- Died: Unknown
- Allegiance: Russian Empire
- Branch: Imperial Russian Army
- Rank: lieutenant general
- Commands: 17th Infantry Division; 9th Army Corps; 2nd Army
- Battles / wars: Russo-Japanese War; World War I

Pyotr Dmitryvich Telezhnikov (birth surname Schreider; born 31 March 1863) was an Imperial Russian division, corps and army commander. He was made a Poruchik in 1886, a Stabskapitän in 1890, a captain in 1892, a Podpolkovnik (lieutenant colonel) in 1896, a Polkovnik (colonel) in 1900 and a major general in 1909. He fought in the war against the Empire of Japan. He retained his original German surname until the war against the German Empire and Austria-Hungary, when changed it to a Russian one. In October 1917, he left Minsk for Petrograd. After the October Revolution, he offered his services to the Soviet Red Army, where he was stationed at Yaroslavsky District, Yaroslavl Oblast from January to December 1919. He retired on August 7, 1920.

== Awards ==
- Order of Saint Stanislaus (House of Romanov), 3rd class, 1898
- Order of Saint Stanislaus (House of Romanov), 2nd class, 1899
- Order of Saint Stanislaus (House of Romanov), 1st class, 1912
- Order of Saint Anna, 3rd class, 1895
- Order of Saint Anna, 2nd class, 1915
- Order of Saint Vladimir, 4th class, 1904
- Order of Saint Vladimir, 3rd class, 1905
- Gold Sword for Bravery, 1906

== Sources ==
- "Pyotr Telezhnikov" (in Russian). «Russian army in a Great war» project.

| Preceded by | Commander of the 17th Infantry Division; March 1915 – April 1917 | Succeeded by |
| Preceded by Nikolay Kiselevsky | Commander of the 9th Army Corps; May–September 1917 | Succeeded by Andrei Snesarev |
| Preceded by Nikolai Danilov | Commander of the 2nd Army; August 6–22, 1917 | Succeeded by Nikolai Danilov |
