= Michael Lapinsky =

Russian neurologist and psychiatrist

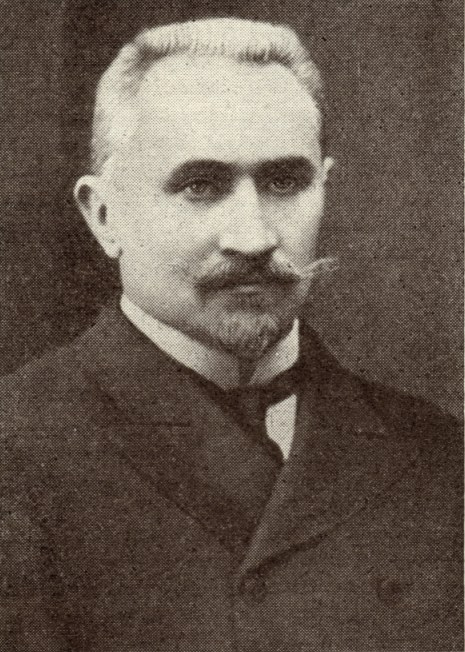
- Born: 5 November 1862; Smoligovka, Chernigov Governorate
- Died: 1947 (aged 84–85); Argentina
- Citizenship: Russian Empire; Yugoslavia
- Education: Saint Vladimir Imperial University of Kiev
- Awards: Order of Saint Vladimir, 4th class Order of Saint Anna, 2nd class Order of Saint Stanislaus, 2nd class
- Scientific career
- Fields: Neurology and psychiatry
- Workplaces: Imperial University of Kiev, University of Zagreb
- Academic advisors: Ivan Sikorsky
- Notable students: Boris Mankovsky

Michael Lapinsky (Russian: Михаил Никитич Лапинский; 1862 – 1947) was a Russian neurologist and psychiatrist. He was a professor at the Imperial University of Kiev and later founded the Department and Clinic for Nervous and Mental Diseases at the University of Zagreb. He authored over 150 scientific publications in Russian, French and German. and played a key role in shaping the early development of neurology education in Kiev. Lapinsky was widely regarded as one of the most prominent Russian neurologists of his time.

== Biography ==
Lapinsky was born on November 5, 1862 in the wealthy family of a college assessor in the village Smolygivka, province of Chernigov, northern Ukraine. He graduated from the Chernigov Gymnasium with a silver medal in 1881 and from the medical faculty of St. Volodymyr University in Kiev with honors in 1891. In 1893, he remained at the university to prepare for a professorship under the mentorship of Ivan Sikorsky. He interned at the Charité clinic in Berlin and studied under the renowned psychiatrist Friedrich von Jolly. In 1897, he defended his doctoral dissertation titled "On Vascular Diseases in Afflictions of Primary Nerve Trunks or Peripheral Nerves." Afterward, he received a two-year assignment to study with leading German psychiatrists and neurologists.

In 1899, he was permitted to lecture at Kiev University as a privatdozent. He combined teaching with clinical practice at the university's clinic for nervous and mental diseases, serving as a resident and assistant. In 1901, he acquired the mansion of Baron Steingel on Bulvarno-Kudryavskaya Street, where he established a physiotherapeutic sanatorium with a hydrotherapy facility, implementing his own methods of hydrotherapy.

In 1904, he was appointed extraordinary professor, and in 1908, full professor of psychiatry and neuropathology at Kiev University, a position he held until 1918. Lapinsky became the first head of the Department of Nervous Diseases at the Medical Faculty of the University of St. Volodymyr in Kyiv. During academic breaks, he regularly visited Berlin and Paris on assignments (1907–1914). In 1910, he participated in the International Congress on Radiology and Electricity in Brussels.

Besides his work at Kiev University, he taught at the Samaritan Women's Courses and the Women's Medical Courses, and headed the neurology department at the City Hospital of Tsarevich Alexander. He also served as deputy chairman of the Psychiatric Society at Kiev University (from 1912) and chairman of the Physical-Medical Society. He was an active member of the Kiev Club of Russian Nationalists.

Lapinsky taught at the University of Kyiv at the time when Mikhail Bulgakov was studying there. Some saw the prototype of Doctor Stravinsky from The Master and Margarita in the figure of Professor Lapinsky.

In 1919, he emigrated to Yugoslavia and settled in Zagreb. The University of Zagreb School of Medicine invited him to organize a department and clinic for nervous and mental diseases in 1920. In February 1921, he was appointed professor of this department. He retired in 1928, and was named professor emeritus and the interim lead of the clinic. His assistants Josip Breitenfeld, Đuro Vranešić and Viktor Ostrovidov took over the day-to-day running of the Clinic. He left for Belgrade in 1930 where he joined the University of Belgrade School of Medicine. In 1931 he joined the Russian Red Cross Clinic, before leaving for Argentina in 1934.

While in exile, he published in the journal "Notes of the Russian Scientific Institute in Belgrade" (1918–1937) and contributed several scientific reports to Soviet medical journals. He authored over 150 works on experimental and clinical neuropathology, including publications in French and German. He maintained connections with the German psychiatrist and neuropathologist Alois Alzheimer, and Soviet neurologists Grigory Rossolimo and Vladimir Bekhterev.

Michael Lapinsky died in 1947 in Argentina.

== Family ==
Their son, Nikita Mikhailovich Lapinsky, was born in 1901, according to the metric book of the Sretenskaya Church in Kiev. His godparents were hereditary honorary citizen Grigory Mikhailovich Minaev and noblewoman Maria Mikhailovna Lapinskaya. At the time of his son's birth, M. N. Lapinsky was recorded in the metric book as a doctor of medicine and privatdozent at St. Vladimir University.

Their daughter, Anna Mikhailovna Lapinskaya (1900–1989), married Alexander Kugushev. Her husband, Alexander Alexandrovich Kugushev (1898–1935), was the son of the Ufa governor and noble leader Alexander Alexandrovich (1862–1919) and nephew of Viatcheslav Kugushev. After 1917, the family emigrated to France. Following her husband's suicide, Anna Mikhailovna moved with her son Alexander Kugushev (born 1931) to her father's residence in Yugoslavia, later living in Austria, Argentina and eventually in Menlo Park, California.

== Awards ==
- Order of Saint Stanislaus, 3rd class;
- Order of Saint Anna, 3rd class (1907);
- Order of Saint Stanislaus, 2nd class (1911);
- Order of Saint Anna, 2nd class (1914);
- Order of Saint Vladimir, 4th class — "for services to the Red Cross Society under wartime conditions" (1915);
- Medal "In Commemoration of the 300th Anniversary of the Reign of the House of Romanov."

== Bibliography ==
- "On the Lumen of Brain Capillaries" — Kiev, University News, 1895, No. 10, Part II; separate reprint.
- "On the Casuistry of Spastic Spinal Paralysis" — Kiev: G. T. Korchak-Novitsky Printing House, 1895.
- "An Introduction to the Study of Spastic Paralysis" — Kiev, 1895.
- "On the State of the Capillaries of the Cerebral Cortex in Arteriosclerosis of Large Vessels" — St. Petersburg: Ya. Trey Printing House, 1896.
- "On the Structure of Capillaries in the Cerebral Cortex" — Questions of Neuro-Psychiatric Medicine, 1896, Vol. II.
- "On the So-Called Fibrous Degeneration of Capillaries (Periarteritis and Endarteritis) of the Brain (Cortex)" — St. Petersburg: M. M. Stasyulevich Printing House, 1896.
- "On Post-Mortem Blood Filling of Cerebral Cortex Capillaries" — Kazan: University Printing House, 1896.
- "On Vascular Diseases in Afflictions of Peripheral Nerve Trunks" — Dissertation for the Degree of Doctor of Medicine. Kiev, 1897.
- "On Circulatory Disorders in Paralyzed Nerves" — Kazan: Imperial University Printing House, 1899.
- "On Nervous System Diseases in Diabetes Mellitus" — Kazan: Imperial University Printing House, 1901.
- "State of Reflexes in Paralyzed Body Parts with Total Spinal Cord Disruptions" — Kiev: Kushnerev & Co. Printing House, 1901.
- "On the Etiology of Vascular Diseases" — Surgery, 1902, Vol. XI.
- "On Motor Neuron Lesions in Tabes Dorsalis" — Kiev: Kushnerev & Co. Printing House, 1902.
- "On the Localization of Motor Functions in the Spinal Cord" — Kiev: Kushnerev & Co. Printing House, 1903.
- "On the Causes of Motor Disorders in Posterior Root Damage and the Distribution of Collateral Branches in the Spinal Cord's Gray Matter" — Kazan: Imperial University Printing House, 1902.
- "On the Suppression of Reflex Acts in Paralyzed Body Parts with Spinal Cord Compression in Upper Sections" — Kazan: Imperial University Printing House, 1902.
- "On the Structure of Capillaries in the Cerebral Cortex" — Kiev: University Printing House, 1903.
- "On the Innervation of Brain Vessels" — Journal of Neuropathology and Psychotherapy, 1903, No. 3.
- "On Degeneration and Regeneration of Peripheral Nerves" — Kiev: Kushnerev & Co. Printing House, 1904.
- "On the Relationship of Ear and Carotid Artery Vasomotors to the Cervical Sympathetic Nerve" — Kiev: Kushnerev & Co. Printing House, 1905.
- "Clinical and Diagnostic Features of Idiopathic and Symptomatic Facial Neuralgia" — [No publication details], [19--].
- "Lesser-Known Forms of Acute Dementia Developing After Trauma" — Kazan: Neurological Bulletin, 1912, Vol. XVIII, Issue 2.
- "On the Mechanism of Sciatic Root Neuralgias" — Russian Physician, 1915, No. 11.
- "On Sensitivity, Reflexes, Motor and Trophic Spheres in (So-Called Root) Sciatic Neuralgia and the Role of Inhibitory and Excitatory Mechanisms from Pelvic Organs" — Moscow: Kushnerev & Co. Printing House, 1915.
- "On the Development of Personality in Women: Public Lecture" — Kiev, 1915.
- "On Pains in the Back of the Neck and Shoulder Area and Their Relation to Pelvic Organ Disorders" — Moscow, 1915.
- "The Role of the Liver in the Etiology of Nervous System Diseases" — Journal of Neuropathology and Psychiatry, 1927, No. 2.
- "Pain and Its Vascular Mechanism" — Notes of the Russian Scientific Institute in Belgrade, 1935, Issue 6.
- "On the Involvement of the Striatal System in the Mechanism of Neurasthenia" — Notes of the Russian Scientific Institute in Belgrade, 1935, Issue 10.
- Ueber das Nervensystem, welches die inneren Organe mit dem Rückenmark verbindet, und die verschiedenen während der visceralen Erkrankungen vorkommenden Reflexvorgänge vermittelt. 1927
- Zur Frage über das Bestehen lokaler Gefäβzentren. (1927)
- Nervöse Symptome auf Grund von Gallenleiden und ihre Behandlung. Münch. med. Wschr 72, s. 1560, 1925
- Über Irradiationen bei Erkrankung des Ostium abdominale tubae Fallopii oder Uterus masculinus. (1926)
- Ueber Meralgie. Deutsche Zeitschrift für Nervenheilkunde 94, ss. 293-311, 1926
- Der Zustand der Reflexe in paralysirten Körpertheilen bei totaler Durchtrennung des Rückenmarkes. Archiv für Psychiatrie und Nervenkrankheiten (1906)
- Zur Frage über die Beteiligung der Nervenstamme der hinteren Extremität an der vasomotorischen Innervation der distalen Gebiete derselben und über die Veränderung der vasomotorischen Elemente sowie der Gefässe selbst der Hinterpfote nach Beschädigung des N. ischiadicus (1906)
- Über die Gefässinnervation der Hundepfote (1904)
- Zur Frage der spinalen Zentren einiger peripherer Nerven beim Hunde. 1903
- Zur Frage der Veränderungen in den peripherischen Nerven bei der chronischen Erkrankung der Gefässe der Extremitäten (1898)
- Deux cas de dégénérescence trophique des vaisseaux consécutive à la névrite périphérique (dégénérescence dite névropathique). Archives de médecine expérimentale et d'anatomie pathologique 11 (1899)
- Ueber Veränderungen der Nerven bei acuter Störung der Blutzufuhr. Deutsche Zeitschrift für Nervenheilkunde 15 (1899)
- Ein Beitrag zur Kenntnis der anatomischen Veränderungen im Cerebralnervensystem bei cerebraler Kinderlähmung. (1900)
- Ueber acute ischämische Lähmung, nebst Bemerkungen über die Veränderungen der Nerven bei acuter Ischämie. Deutsche Zeitschrift für Nervenheilkunde (1900)
- Ueber den Ursprung des Halssympathicus im Rückenmark. (1900)
- Ueber den normalen Bau und über pathologische Veränderungen der feinsten Gehirncapillaren. 1894
- К вопросу о просвете капилляров мозга. Университетские известия 10, 2, 1895
- Zur Frage über den Zustand der kleinen Capillaren der Gehirnrinde bei Arteriosclerose der grossen Gefässe. Neurologisches Centralblatt 15, ss. 921-925, 1896

== Sources ==
- Kalchenko, T. V. Kyiv Club of Russian Nationalists: A Historical Encyclopedia. — Kyiv: Kyivskie Vedomosti, 2008. — p. 158.
- Kugushev, A. (2011). Under the Wheel of History: A Woman's Journey Through the Twentieth Century. (n.p.): CreateSpace Independent Publishing Platform.
- Brief biography by S. Vavilov Institute for the History of Science and Technology (in Russian)
