= Mikhail Sokovin =

Russian Army commander (1863–1943)

- Born: 18 October 1863
- Died: 1943 (aged 79–80) Moscow, Soviet Union
- Allegiance: Russian Empire
- Branch: Imperial Russian Army
- Commands: 1st Brigade, 27th Infantry Division; 25th Infantry Division; 1st Army; 8th Army
- Conflicts: Boxer Rebellion; Russo-Japanese War; World War I

Mikhail Sokovin (Russian, Михаил Алексеевич Соковнин, 18 October 1863 – 1943) was an Imperial Russian army commander. He served in China and fought in the war against the Empire of Japan. He was promoted to polkovnik (colonel) in April 1902 and major general in April 1908.

== Awards ==
- Order of Saint Stanislaus (House of Romanov), 3rd class, 1893
- Order of Saint Anna, 3rd class, 1896
- Order of Saint Stanislaus (House of Romanov), 2nd class, 1899
- Order of Saint Anna, 2nd class, 1900
- Order of Saint Vladimir, 4th class, 1902
- Order of Saint Vladimir, 3rd class (November 26, 1904)
- Order of Saint Stanislaus (House of Romanov), 1st class (December 6, 1912)
- Order of Saint Anna, 1st class, 1914
- Order of Saint Vladimir, 2nd class, 1916
- Order of the White Eagle (Russian Empire), 1917

Preceded by	Commander of the 1st Brigade, 27th Infantry Division; 1913–1914	Succeeded by
Preceded by	Commander of the 25th Infantry Division; 1915	Succeeded by
Preceded by Ilia Odishelidze	Commander of the 1st Army; April 22 – July 30, 1917	Succeeded by Gleb Vannovsky
Preceded by	Commander of the 8th Army; July 30 – October 17, 1917	Succeeded by
