= Anthony Veselovsky =

Imperial Russian division, corps and army commander (1866–1939)

Anthony Andreevich Veselovsky
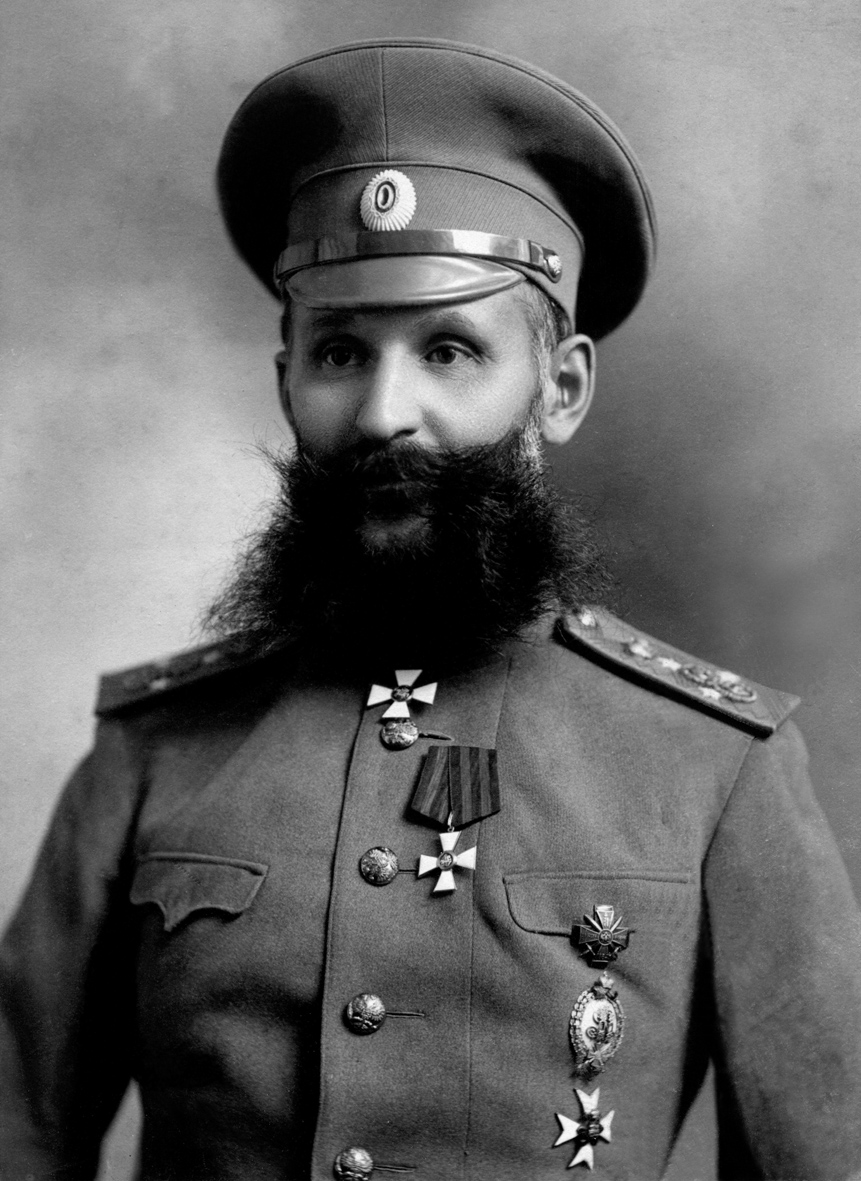
- Native name: Антоний Андреевич Веселовский
- Born: 7 March 1866; Russian Empire
- Died: 26 October 1939 (aged 73) Vladikavkaz, Soviet Union
- Allegiance: Russian Empire; Russian Republic (from 1917)
- Branch: Imperial Russian Army; Russian Army (from 1917)
- Service years: 1885–1917
- Rank: lieutenant general
- Commands: 46th Infantry Division; 44th Infantry Division; 19th Army Corps; 2nd Army
- Conflicts: World War I

Anthony Andreevich Veselovsky (Russian: Антоний Андреевич Веселовский; 7 March 1866 – 26 October 1939) was an Imperial Russian division, corps and army commander.

== Life ==
Veselovsky was born 7 March 1866. He was educated at the Pskov Cadet Corps, an entered service in 1885. H graduated from the Nikolaev Engineering School in 1887 and graduated as a second lieutenant with seniority from 11 August 1886 in the 3rd Railway Battalion. In 1890 he was promoted to lieutenant. In 1896 he was promoted to staff captain, in 1898 to captain, and 1901 to lieutenant colonel. He taught at the Tiflis Cadet Corps. From 1904 he commanded a battalion stationed in Tehran.

== Awards ==
- Order of Saint Stanislaus (House of Romanov), 2nd class, 1892
- Order of Saint Anna, 2nd class, 1909
- Order of Saint Vladimir, 4th class, 1912
- Order of Saint Vladimir, 3rd class, 1914
- Order of Saint George, 4th degree, 1915
- Gold Sword for Bravery (Saint George Sword), 1915
- Order of Saint George, 3rd degree, 1915
- Order of Saint Stanislaus (House of Romanov), 1st class, 1915
- Order of Saint Anna, 1st class, 1915
- Order of Saint Vladimir, 2nd class, 1916
- Order of the White Eagle (Russian Empire), 1917

== Bibliography ==
- Варшавско-Ивангородская операция. Сборник документов мировой империалистической войны на русском фронте (1914—1917). М., 1938.
- «Военный орден святого великомученика и победоносца Георгия. Биобиблиографический справочник» РГВИА, М., 2004.
- Волков С. В. Генералитет Российской империи: Энциклопедический словарь генералов и адмиралов от Петра I до Николая II, в 2-х т. Центрполиграф: Москва, 2009.
- Список старшим войсковым начальникам, начальникам штабов: округов, корпусов и дивизий и командирам отдельных строевых частей. С.-Петербург. Военная Типография. 1913.
- Список генералам по старшинству. Составлен по 15.04.1914. Петроград, 1914
- Список генералам по старшинству. Составлен по 10.07.1916. Петроград, 1916
- Сухарева О. В. Кто был кто в России. — М., АСТ., 2005. — ISBN 5-17023261-6

| Preceded by | Commander of the 46th Infantry Division; February – August 1915 | Succeeded by Stepan Mikhailovich Solunskov |
| Preceded by Sergey Fedorovich Dobrotin | Commander of the 44th Infantry Division; August – November 1915 | Succeeded by Januarius Tsikhovich |
| Preceded by Dmitry Alexandrovich Dolgov | Commander of the 19th Army Corps; November 1915 – April 1917 | Succeeded by Vladimir Vasilievich Antipov |
| Preceded by Vladimir Vasilyevich Smirnov | Commander of the 2nd Army; 8 April – 12 July 1917 | Succeeded by Nikolai Danilov |
