= Alexander Sirotkin =

Soviet military commander (1890–1965)

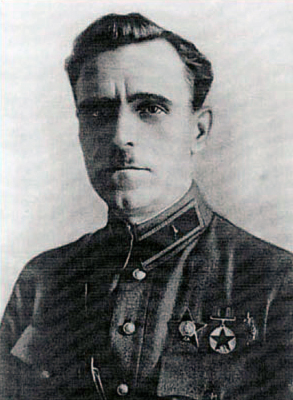
- Born: 6 August 1890; Bochatino village, Tikhvinsky Uyezd, Novgorod Governorate, Russian Empire
- Died: 17 January 1965 (aged 74); Moscow, Soviet Union
- Military career
- Allegiance: Russian Empire; Soviet Union
- Branch: Imperial Russian Army; Soviet Red Army
- Service years: 1910–1917 (Russian Empire); 1917–1959 (Soviet Union)
- Rank: Lieutenant general
- Commands: 15th Rifle Division
- Conflicts: World War I Russian Civil War; World War II

Alexander Savelyevich Sirotkin (Russian: Александр Савельевич Сироткин; August 6, 1890 – January 17, 1965) was a Soviet lieutenant general and division commander.

Sirotkin was born in Bogatino village in the Novgorod Governorate on 6 August [19 August N.S.] 1890. After education in a local school he went to Saint Petersburg to seek employment and was there drafted into the 4th Finnish Rifle Regiment. In April 1914 he voluntarily re-enlisted to become a senior non-commissioned officer.

He fought for the Imperial Russian Army in World War I. He received the Cross of St. George, the Order of Saint Vladimir, the Order of Saint Anna, and the Order of Saint Stanislaus (House of Romanov). For his service he was commissioned as an ensign and then promoted to lieutenant. He was in hospital in Kharkov at the time of the [[[February Revolution]]. In August 1917 he transferred to the 189th Reserve Infantry Regiment at Mtsensk to serve as company commander.

After the October Revolution in November 1917, his regiment went over to the Bolsheviks as the 1st Mtsensk Regiment of the Red Army and Sirotkin fought for them in the subsequent civil war in the Eastern, South-Eastern and Southern theatres. In July 1918 he became chief of staff of the 1st Brigade of the 15th Inza Rifle Division and later rose to command the unit. Sirotkin became senior inspector of the Donetsk Division of the All-Russian Extraordinary Commission, guarding coal mines in Donetsk.

From 1936 he was head of the Border and Internal Security Directorate of the NKVD of the West Siberian Military District. During the Second World War he was chief of the NKVD troops assigned to the protection of important industrial sites. From 1951 to 1954 he was head of the Escort Guard Directorate of the USSR Ministry of Internal Affairs and later served in senior roles commanding the ministry's internal troops. He died on 17 January 1965 in Moscow and is buried at Novodevichy Cemetery alongside his wife Sirotkina Alexandra Nikolaevna (1901–1976).

He was awarded the Order of Lenin, the Order of the Red Banner, the Order of the Red Star, and, for his participation in the Great Patriotic War, the Order of Suvorov.

Preceded by Yan Latsis	Commander of the 15th Rifle Division; November 1919	Succeeded by Mikhail Sangursky
