= Feofil Egorovich Meyendorf =

Imperial Russian military leader

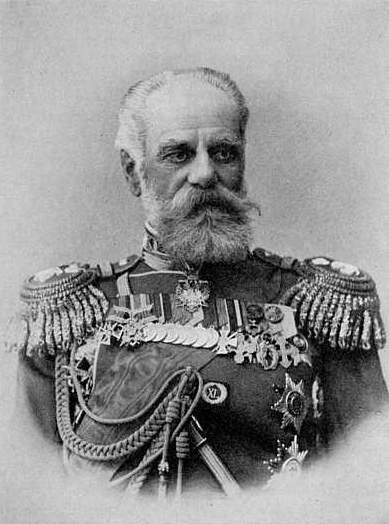
- Born: Bogdan Theophil von Meyendorff; 4 August 1838
- Died: 18 October 1919 (aged 81); Mikhailovskoye, Moscow, Russian SFSR
- Military career
- Allegiance: Russian Empire
- Branch: Imperial Russian Army
- Commands: 2nd Cavalry Division; 1st Army Corps
- Conflicts: Caucasian War; Russo-Turkish War; Russo-Japanese War

Baron Feofil Egorovich (von) Meyendorf (Russian: Феофи́л Его́рович (фон) Мейендо́рф; German: Bogdan Theophil Freiherr von Meyendorff; 4 August 1838 – 18 October 1919) was an Imperial Russian military leader of Baltic German descent. He fought in the Caucasus and against the Ottoman Empire and the Empire of Japan, as well as in the Balkans (Battle of Rahova).

== Awards ==
- Order of Saint Stanislaus (House of Romanov), 3rd class, 1861
- Order of Saint Anna, 3rd class, 1861
- Order of Saint Stanislaus (House of Romanov), 2nd class, 1862
- Order of Saint Vladimir, 4th class, 1869
- Order of Saint Vladimir, 3rd class, 1870
- Order of Saint Stanislaus (House of Romanov), 1st class, 1878
- Gold Sword for Bravery, 1878
- Order of Saint Anna, 1st class, 1883
- Order of Saint Vladimir, 2nd class, 1889
- Order of the White Eagle (Russian Empire), 1894
- Order of Saint Alexander Nevsky, 1901
- 2nd Gold Sword for Bravery, 1905
- Order of Saint George, 4th degree, 1908
- Order of Saint Vladimir, 1st class, 1910
- Crossing of the Danube Cross (Kingdom of Romania)

== Children ==
- son Nikolai Meyendorff (1887-1969)

| Preceded by | Commander of the 2nd Cavalry Division; 1884-1892 | Succeeded by |
| Preceded by Mikhail Pavlovich Danilov | Commander of the 1st Army Corps; 1896–1905 | Succeeded by Nikolay Iudovich Ivanov |
