= Nikolai Epanchin =

Imperial Russian division and corps commander

Nikolai Alexeyevich Epanchin
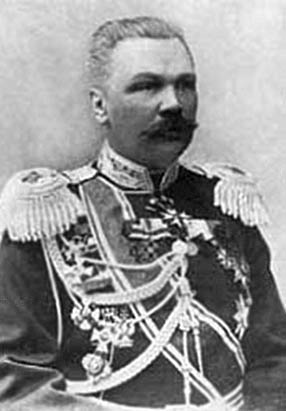
- Born: January 29, 1857
- Died: February 12, 1941
- Allegiance: Russian Empire
- Service / branch: Imperial Russian Army
- Commands: 42nd Infantry Division; 3rd Army Corps
- Battles / wars: Russo-Turkish War; World War I

Nikolai Alexeyevich Epanchin (Russian, Николай Алексеевич Епанчин, 1857 - 1941) was an Imperial Russian division and corps commander. He fought in World War I against the Ottoman Empire.

== Awards ==
- Order of Saint Anna, 4th class, 1878
- Order of Saint Stanislaus (House of Romanov), 3rd class, 1878
- Order of Saint Anna, 3rd class, 1884
- Order of Saint Stanislaus (House of Romanov), 2nd class, 1887
- Order of Saint Anna, 2nd class, 1890
- Order of Saint Vladimir, 4th class, 1894
- Order of Saint Vladimir, 3rd class, 1896
- Order of Saint Stanislaus (House of Romanov), 1st class, 1902
- Order of Saint Anna, 1st class, 1906
- Order of Saint Vladimir, 2nd class, 1910

Preceded by	Chief of Staff of the 1st Guards Infantry Division; 1895-1900	Succeeded by
Preceded by	Commander of the 42nd Infantry Division; 1907-1913	Succeeded by
Preceded by Paul von Rennenkampf	Commander of the 3rd Army Corps; 1913-1915	Succeeded by AA Zegelov
