= 45th Infantry Division (Russian Empire) =

- 45-я пехотная дивизия
- Active: 1914–1918
- Country: Russian Empire
- Branch: Russian Imperial Army
- Role: Infantry

The 45th Infantry Division (Russian: 45-я пехотная дивизия, 45-ya Pekhotnaya Diviziya) was an infantry formation of the Russian Imperial Army.

== Organization ==
It was part of the 16th Army Corps.

- 1st Brigade
  - 177th Infantry Regiment
  - 178th Infantry Regiment
- 2nd Brigade
  - 179th Infantry Regiment
  - 180th Infantry Regiment
- 45th Artillery Brigade

== Commanders ==
- 1906-1907: Alexander Iosafovich Ievreinov
- 1908-1910: Pavel Savvich
