= Illarion Vasilchikov =

Russian general (1805–1862)

Illarion Illarionovich Vasilchikov
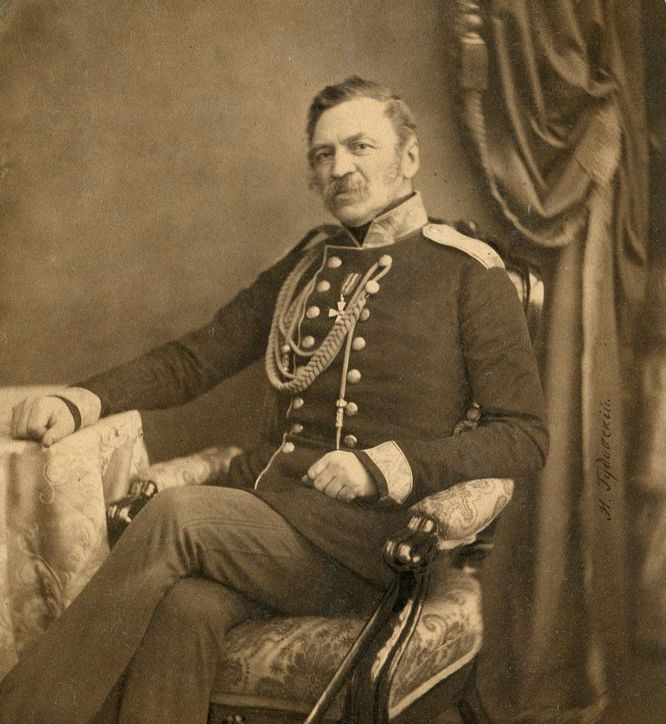
- Illarion I. Vasilchikov in 1850s
- Born: 1805
- Died: 12 November 1862 (aged 56–57) Kiev, Russian Empire
- Allegiance: Russian Empire
- Branch: Imperial Russian Army
- Rank: lieutenant general
- Commands: Chief of Staff to general Menshikov's Crimea command, 1855. Kiev Military District

Illarion Illarionovich Vasilchikov (1805 – 12 November 1862) was an Imperial Russian general and the great grandson of emperor Alexander I of Russia. He was the son of Illarion Vasilyevich Vasilchikov and Vera Vasilchikova. He was the father of Sergei Vasilchikov. One of his daughters married Alexander Meyendorf. He was a recipient of the Order of Saint Alexander Nevsky, the Order of Saint Anna, the Order of Saint Vladimir and the Order of the White Eagle (Russian Empire). He is buried at Kiev Pechersk Lavra in Ukraine.

Preceded by	Commander of the Kiev Military District; July–November 1862	Succeeded by
