= 17th Infantry Division (Russian Empire) =

- 17-я пехотная дивизия
- Active: 1914–1918
- Country: Russian Empire
- Branch: Russian Imperial Army
- Role: Infantry

The 17th Infantry Division (Russian: 17-я пехо́тная диви́зия, 17-ya Pekhotnaya Diviziya) was an infantry formation of the Russian Imperial Army.

== Organization ==
- 1st Brigade
  - 65th Infantry Regiment
  - 66th Infantry Regiment
- 2nd Brigade
  - 67th Infantry Regiment
  - 68th Infantry Regiment
- 17th Artillery Brigade

== Commanders ==
- March 1915-April 1917: Pyotr Telezhnikov
