= Nikolai Danilov =

Russian and Soviet general (1867–1934)

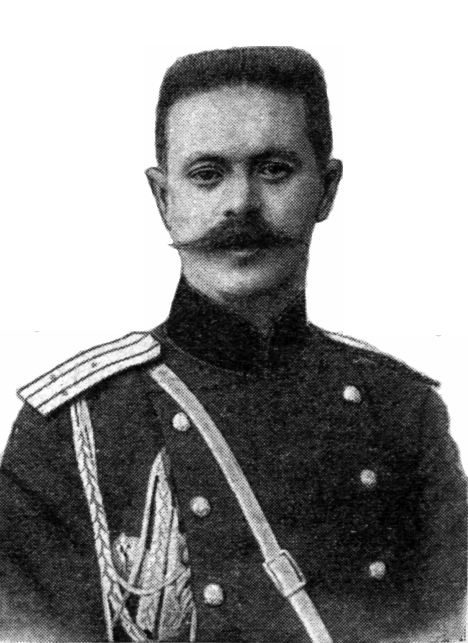
- Born: April 25, 1867 Moscow, Russian Empire
- Died: May 1934 (aged 67) Leningrad, Soviet Union
- Allegiance: Russian Empire
- Branch: Imperial Russian Army
- Rank: General of the Infantry
- Commands: 10th Army Corps; 2nd Army
- Battles / wars: World War I

Nikolai Danilov (April 25, 1867 – May 1934) was an Imperial Russian corps and army commander. He was promoted to Podpolkovnik (lieutenant colonel) in 1898, Polkovnik (colonel) in 1902, major general in 1908 and lieutenant general in 1911. After the October Revolution, he entered the service of the Soviet Red Army.

== Works ==
- Historical overview of the development of military governance in Russia. ST. PETERSBURG, 1902.
- Historical overview of the activities of the Office of the Ministry of war. ST. PETERSBURG, 1909.
- The role of infantry in modern battle. ST. PETERSBURG, 1911.
- The influence of the great world war on the economic situation in Russia: lectures, chitannye in the military engineering Academy at 1920-21 Stud. year. -PG, 1922.
- Hybrid operation in the Gulf of Riga in June–August 1916, g.-l., Naval Academy of the RKKA, 1927.

== Bibliography ==
- "Данилов Николай Александрович". Список генералам по старшинству. Часть I, II и III. Составлен по 1 июля 1909 года. СПб.: Военная типография. 1909. p. 792.
- Залесский К. А. (2003). Кто был кто в Первой мировой войне (5000 экз ed.). Moscow: АСТ; Астрель. ISBN 5-17-019670-9 (ACT); ISBN 5-271-06895-1 (Астрель)

== Sources ==
- Биография Данилова Н.А. на сайте «Хронос»
- "Nikolai Danilov" (in Russian). «Russian army in a Great war» project.
- Воспоминания Г. И. Шавельского

Preceded by	Commander of the 10th Army Corps; 1916–1917	Succeeded by Januariusz Cichowicz
Preceded by Anthony Veselovsky	Commander of the 2nd Army; July 12 – August 7, 1917	Succeeded by Pyotr Telezhnikov
Preceded by Pyotr Telezhnikov	Commander of the 2nd Army; August 22 – November 20, 1917	Succeeded by Aleksei Baiov
