= Alexander Mikhailovich Lermontov =

Russian division commander

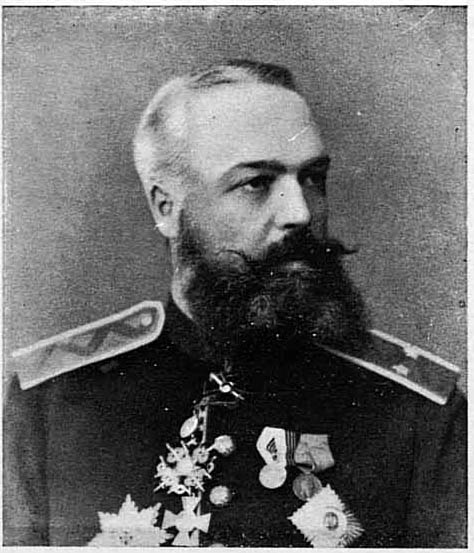
- Born: 27 February 1838
- Died: 26 December 1906 (aged 68); Saint Petersburg, Russian Empire
- Allegiance: Russian Empire
- Service / branch: Imperial Russian Army
- Commands: 12th Cavalry Division
- Battles / wars: Russo-Turkish War

Alexander Mikhailovich Lermontov (27 February 1838 – 26 December 1906) was an Imperial Russian division commander. He participated in the war against the Ottoman Empire.

== Awards ==
- Order of Saint Anna, 3rd class, 1863
- Order of Saint Stanislaus (House of Romanov), 2nd class, 1867
- Order of Saint Stanislaus with Imperial Crown, 1869
- Order of Saint Anna, 2nd class, 1871
- Order of Saint Vladimir, 4th class, 1873
- Gold Sword for Bravery, 1878
- Order of Saint Stanislaus (House of Romanov), 1st class, 1867
- Order of Saint Vladimir, 3rd class, 1882
- Order of Saint Anna, 1st class, 1882
- Order of Saint Vladimir, 2nd class, 1885
- Order of the White Eagle (Russian Empire), 1890
- Order of Saint Alexander Nevsky, 1897
- Order of the Red Eagle, 2nd class, 1875
- Order of the Crown (Prussia), 2nd class, 1880

Preceded by Victor Fedorovitch Winberg	Commander of the 12th Cavalry Division; 1886–1896	Succeeded by David Ivanovich Orlov

== Sources ==
- Раритетная библиотека исторических фактов
- Памятник Восточной Войны 1877—1878 гг. Составил: А. А. Старчевский. Издание: М. Г. Назимовой. С.—Петербург. Типография Б. Г. Янпольского, Демидов пер., дом № 5, 1878.
- Паметниците на града — духовни мостове във времето (in Bulgarian)
- Список генералам по старшинству 1905 года.
