= 12th Cavalry Division (Russian Empire) =

- 12-я кавалерийская дивизия
- Active: 1875–1918
- Country: Russian Empire
- Branch: Russian Imperial Army
- Role: Cavalry

The 12th Cavalry Division (Russian: 12-я кавалерийская дивизия, 12-ya Kavaleriiskaya Diviziya) was a cavalry formation of the Russian Imperial Army.

== Organization ==
- 1st Cavalry Brigade
  - 12th Regiment of Dragoons
  - 12th Uhlan Regiment
- 2nd Cavalry Brigade
  - 12th Regiment of Hussars
  - 12th Regiment of Cossacks
- 12th Horse Artillery Division

== Commanders ==
- 1878–1886: Victor Fedorovitch Winberg
- 1886–1896: Alexander Mikhailovich Lermontov
- 1896–1898: David Ivanovich Orlov
- 1898–1899: Sergei Vasilchikov
- 1912-1915: Alexey Kaledin
- 1915-1917: Carl Gustaf Emil Mannerheim
