= Petr G. Kravtsov =

Kravtsov Petr Gavrilovich
- Born: January 21, 1861; Ragozina Balka, Don Host Oblast
- Died: January 12, 1919 (aged 57); Tsaritsyn
- Military career
- Allegiance: Russia
- Branch: Russian Imperial Army Don Army
- Service years: 1879–1919
- Rank: Russian Imperial Army: Yesaul 1898; Voiskovoi Starshina 1908; Don Army: Colonel January 1915; Major General December 1918
- Commands: 16th Special Escadron of 14th Army; 3rd Cossack Division of the Don Army
- Conflicts: World War I; Eastern Front; Russian Civil War; Battle for Tsaritsyn
- Awards: Order of St. Anna of 2nd degree Order of St. Anna of 3rd degree Order of Saint Stanislaus of 3rd degree Order of Saint Stanislaus of 2nd degree

Petr Gavrilovich Kravtzov (Russian: Пётр Гаври́лович Кравцо́в; January 21, 1861 – January 21, 1919) was an officer of the Russian Imperial Army and major general of the Don Army. During the First World War he was a commander of the Sixteenth Special Don Cossack Regiment, and after his promotion to major general from April 1917 to January 1918 Commander of the 3rd Don Cossack Division.

== Biography ==
Petr Kravtzov was born into a Don Cossacks family of Kravtzov on January 21, 1861, in Rogozina Balka Estate. His father was a Don Cossacks khorunzhyi, Gavriil Pavlovich Kravtzov and his mother was from the pomeschik family, Natalia P. Selavanova (ru:Селивановы). The family were great friends of Anton Chekhov after his first visit to the steppe in 1876 to the Kravtzov's country house in Rogozina Balka. Anton Chekhov privately tutored Petr Kravtzov before his student days in Taganrog

== Military career ==
Kravtzov reported for active duty on September 1, 1879, and was assigned to the 20th Don Cossacks Cavalry Regiment stationed at Don Host Oblast. Between 1882 and 1887, Kravtzov served with the 5th Don Cossack Cavalry Regiment at various postings in Poland and in the West Ukraine.

On April 15, 1898, he was promoted to Yesaul and took command of a troop of the 15th Don Cossack Cavalry Regiment. When World War I began, he was reverted to the rank of colonel in the Russian Imperial Army to which he had been promoted on July 2, 1915. He was placed in command of the 16th Special Escadron of the 14th Army Corps.

In the Russian Civil War he commanded the 3rd Don Division in the Cossack corps of the Don Army of Generals Alexander V. Golubintzev and Mamontov K.K. General Petr Kravtzov was killed by Bolsheviks under command of Semyon Budyonny in the Battle of Tsaritsyn on January 21, 1919, where he fought in the field until out of ammunition, and remained until the Bolsheviks made their final assault to give time for his men to escape. He was killed and his body was sabred until unrecognizable.
