= Mikhail Pavlovich Danilov =

Imperial Russian general and corps commander

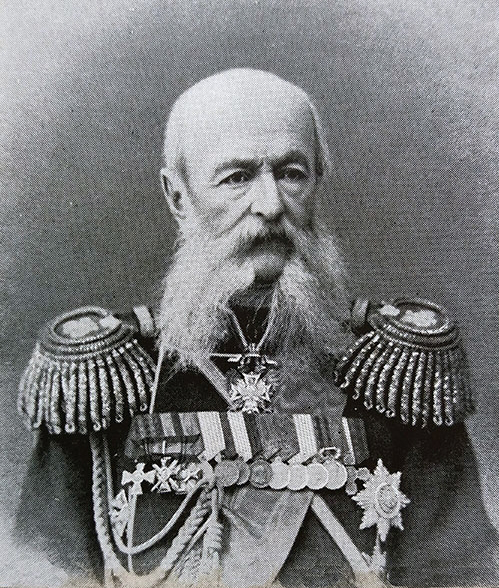
- Born: 15 May 1825
- Died: 17 January 1906 (aged 80)
- Allegiance: Russian Empire
- Branch: Imperial Russian Army
- Commands: 1st Guards Infantry Division; 1st Army Corps
- Conflicts: Crimean War; January Uprising; Russo-Turkish War

Mikhail Pavlovich Danilov (Russian: Михаи́л Па́влович Дани́лов; 15 May 1825 – 17 January 1906) was an Imperial Russian general and corps commander. He fought in the Crimean War, the January Uprising in Poland and the Russo-Turkish War of 1877–1878.

== Rank ==
- Second Lieutenant: 1846
- Poruchik: 1848
- Stabskapitän: 1851
- Captain: 1854
- Colonel: 1859
- Major general: 1868
- Lieutenant general: 1878
- General: 1898

== Awards ==
- Order of Saint Vladimir, 4th class, 1854
- Order of Saint Stanislaus (House of Romanov), 1st class, 1870
- Order of Saint Anna, 1st class, 1874
- Order of Saint George, 4th degree, 1877
- Order of Saint Vladimir, 2nd class, 1879
- Order of the White Eagle (Russian Empire), 1880
- Order of Saint Alexander Nevsky

Preceded by Duke Alexander Petrovich of Oldenburg	Commander of the 1st Guards Infantry Division; 1884–1889	Succeeded by Nikolai Obolensky
Preceded by Alexander Petrovich Barklai de-Tolli-Veimarn	Commander of the 1st Army Corps; 1888–1896	Succeeded by Feofil Egorovich Meindorf
