= Victor Fedorovitch Winberg =

Russian general

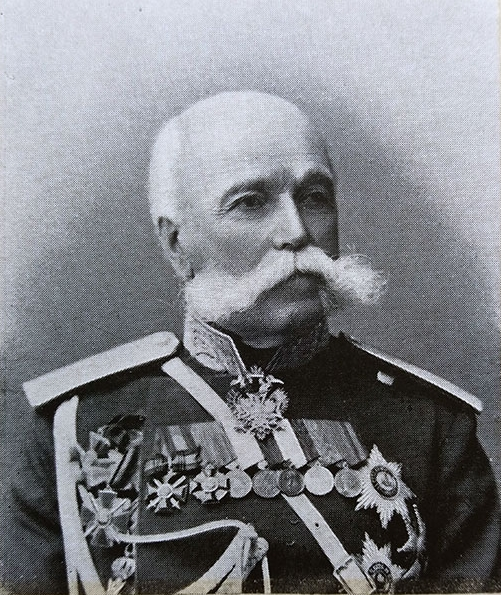
- Born: 16 June 1832
- Died: 19 August 1918 (aged 86)
- Allegiance: Russian Empire
- Branch: Imperial Russian Army
- Rank: General of the cavalry
- Commands: 12th Cavalry Division; 2nd Guards Cavalry Division; 10th Army Corps
- Battles / wars: January Uprising; Russo-Turkish War

Victor Fedorovitch Winberg (Russian: Виктор Фёдорович Винберг; 16 June 1832 – 19 August 1918) was an Imperial Russian division commander. He was the father of Fyodor Viktorovich Vinberg. He participated in the suppression of the 1863 uprising in Poland as well as the war against the Ottoman Empire.

Preceded by	Chief of Staff of the 2nd Guards Infantry Division; 1863-1865	Succeeded by Kozen
Preceded by	Commander of the 12th Cavalry Division; 1878–1886	Succeeded by Alexander Mikhailovich Lermontov
Preceded by	Commander of the 2nd Guards Cavalry Division; 1886-1890	Succeeded by
Preceded by	Commander of the 10th Army Corps; 1890–1901	Succeeded by

== Sources ==
- Альманах современных русских государственных деятелей. СПб.: Тип. Исидора Гольдберга. 1897. pp. 887–888.
