= Grigori Chernozubov =

Russian brigade commander

Grigori Fyodorovich Chernozubov
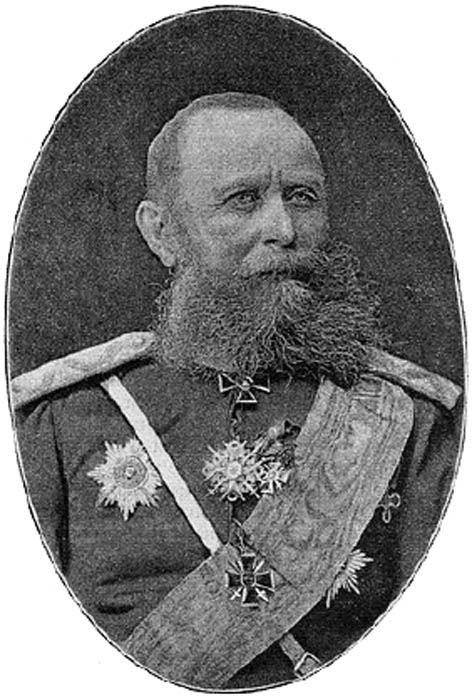
- Born: January 30, 1835
- Died: Unknown
- Allegiance: Russian Empire
- Branch: Imperial Russian Army
- Battles / wars: Crimean War; Russo-Turkish War

Grigori Fyodorovich Chernozubov (Russian: Григо́рий Фёдорович Чёрнозу́бов; January 30, 1835 – ?) was an Imperial Russian brigade commander. He fought in the Crimean War and the Russo-Turkish War of 1877–1878. He was the father of Fyodor Chernozubov.

== Awards ==
- Order of Saint Anna, 3rd class, 1864
- Order of Saint Anna, 2nd class, 1874
- Order of Saint Vladimir, 4th class, 1877
- Gold Sword for Bravery, 1878
- Order of Saint Vladimir, 3rd class, 1878
- Order of Saint Stanislaus (House of Romanov), 1st class, 1879
- Order of Saint Anna, 1st class, 1879
- Order of Saint Vladimir, 2nd class, 1884

Preceded by Viktor Alekseyevich Rodionov	Commander of the 2nd Brigade, 1st Don Cossack Division; 1878–1889	Succeeded by Luizov

== Sources ==
- Краткая биография Г. Ф. Чернозубова
- Список генералам по старшинству. Составлен по 1 сентября 1896 года. СПб., 1896
