= Grigory Choglokov =

Commander of the Imperial Russian Army

Grigory Ivanovich Choglokov
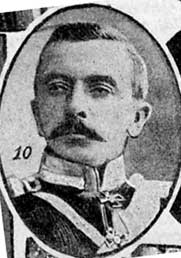
- Born: November 4, 1867
- Died: June 27, 1921 (aged 53) Constantinople, Ottoman Empire
- Allegiance: Russian Empire
- Branch: Imperial Russian Army
- Rank: lieutenant general
- Commands: 1st Don Cossack Division
- Conflicts: World War I

Grigory Ivanovich Choglokov (November 4, 1867 – June 27, 1921) was a division commander of the Imperial Russian Army. At the beginning of World War I, he was a major general. He was promoted in 1915. After the October Revolution, he opposed the Bolsheviks and emigrated to Turkey.

== Awards ==
- Order of Saint Anna, 3rd class, 1899
- Order of Saint Stanislaus (House of Romanov), 2nd class, 1904
- Order of Saint Anna, 2nd class, 1908
- Order of Saint Vladimir, 3rd class, 1912
- Order of St. George, 4th class, 1915
- Gold Sword for Bravery, 1915
- Order of Saint Anna, 1st class, 1916
- Order of Saint Vladimir, 2nd class, 1917

Preceded by Aglay Dmitriyevich Kuzmin-Korovaev	Commander of the 1st Don Cossack Division; 1914–1916	Succeeded by Pyotr Ivanovich Greeks

== Sources ==
- Р. Г. Гагкуев, В. Ж. Цветков, С. С. Балмасов Генерал Келлер в годы Великой войны и русской смуты // Граф Келлер М.: НП «Посев», 2007 ISBN 5-85824-170-0
- "Grigory Choglokov" (in Russian). «Russian army in a Great war» project.
