= Leonard Jaczewski =

Polish geologist and explorer (1858–1916)

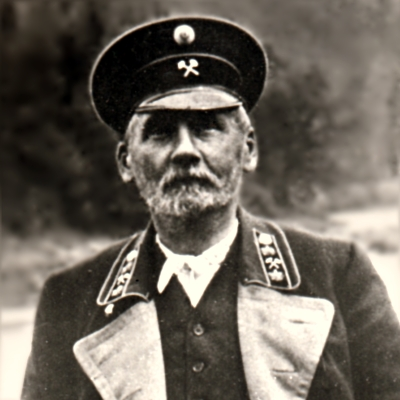
L. Jaczewski

Leonard Jaczewski (Russian: Леонард Антонович Ячевский; Polish: Leonard Jaczewski;; 1858–1916) was a Polish geologist, geographer, engineer and explorer of Siberia. He was one of the pioneers in the study of permafrost.

== Biography ==
After graduating from high school in Warsaw Jaczewski began his studies at the St. Petersburg Mining Institute, graduating in 1883. Following this, he worked in Irkutsk, taking part in an expedition to the summit of Mönkh Saridag and acting as an expert in to the gold mining industry in Transbaikal. He is credited with discovering and naming several glaciers, as well as making many geomorphological and meteorological observations. In addition to this he spent time studying the geology of the shores of Lake Khövsgöl in Mongolia.

Jaczewski is known as one of the first researchers in the world to discover the relationship of the thickness of snow cover to the depth of a layer of permafrost. He also clarified the location of the southern boundary of the permafrost in Siberia. Until 1890 he took part in the classification of deposits (bituminous coals, for example) in the Semipalatinsk area, the Urals, and Kazakhstan, then moved to the Yenisei, where he was hired by Jenisejskim District Operation Gold.

From 1893 to 1894, Jaczewski worked in a group of geologists and engineers alongside Charles Bohdanowcza, on the Achinsk - Baikal stretch of the Trans-Siberian railway. At the same time he investigated the area for mineral deposits and water. Jaczewski was co-author of a geological map of the areas adjacent to this section of the railway.

From 1895 to 1898, Jaczewski set out individually to look for jade, and in 1896 he discovered riverside deposits. In 1905, he was head of a geological expedition in the region of Minusinsk (Tuva). In 1908, he was requested by the authorities to develop the first Russian Geological Survey in Siberia, which was founded in 1918. In 1913, Jaczewski was elected as a member of the St. Petersburg Committee of Geology.

Towards the end of his life, he became professor of mineralogy at the School of Mining in Yekaterinburg in the Urals, where he became the chair of mineralogy. He published mainly in Russian, but also in Polish as he liked to strongly emphasize his Polishness, and was known for his criticism of the tsarist regime.

== Literature ==
- Obituary — Spencer L. J. Biographical Notices of Mineralogists Recently Deceased. (Second Series.) Mineralogical Magazine. 1924. N 20. P. 252-275.

== Links ==
- "Ячевский, Леонард Антонович" . Brockhaus and Efron Encyclopedic Dictionary (in Russian). 1906.
- (in Polish) Leonard Jaczewski, biography
- Analecta: studia i materiały z dziejów nauki. Wydawnictwo IHNOIT PAN. 1999. p. 102.
