= Nikolai Filatov =

Russian firearms designer (1862–1935)

Nikolai Mikhailovich Filatov
- Born: Nikolai Mikhailovich Filatov; October 9, 1862
- Died: February 24, 1935 (aged 72)
- Occupation: Scientist

Nikolai Mikhailovich Filatov (Russian: Никола́й Миха́йлович Фила́тов; 27 October [O.S. 15 October] 1862 – 24 February 1935) was a Russian scientist in the field of theory of shooting from small arms.

Filatov graduated from the Mikhailovskaya Artillery Academy in 1887 and became a teacher at the Moscow Infantry School. In 1892–1917, he taught at the Oranienbaum Officer Shooting School and tested automatic small firearms at the firing range on school premises, which he had founded in 1905. Nikolai Filatov was the one to support the work of the first Russian inventors and automatic weapons designers, such as Vladimir Fyodorov, Fedor Tokarev, Yakov Roshchepey, Vasily Degtyaryov and others.

Filatov rose to the rank of lieutenant-general in the Imperial Russian Army and was chief of a department of the artillery committee of the Main Artillery Directorate. He designed a three-wheeled armoured car that was produced at Oranienbaum from 1916.

After the October Revolution, Nikolai Filatov assisted in preparing the first Soviet infantry officer personnel. In 1918, he was appointed director of the Higher Shooting School of the Red Army, created on the basis of the Oranienbaum Officer Shooting School. In 1922, Nikolai Filatov became chairman of the shooting committee of the Red Army and then infantry inspection member. He authored the Notes on the Theory of Shooting ("Записки по теории стрельбы"; 1897) and many other works. Nikolai Filatov was awarded the Order of the Red Banner of Labour.
