= Volodymyr Sikevych =

Ukrainian general (1870–1952)

Volodymyr Vasylovych Sikevych
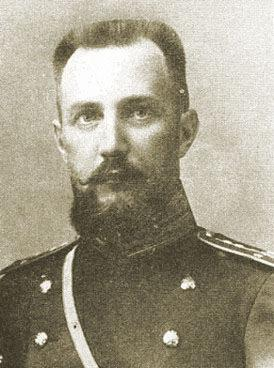
- Born: September 4, 1870; Tarashcha, Kiev Governorate, Russian Empire
- Died: July 27, 1952 (aged 81); Toronto, Ontario, Canada
- Military career
- Allegiance: Russia (1888-1917); Ukraine; Canada (1924-1952)
- Branch: Imperial Russian Army; Ukrainian People's Army
- Service years: 1888–1919
- Rank: General Khorunzhy
- Commands: Haydamatsky Kish (Zaporizhia Division)
- Conflicts: World War I; Ukrainian–Soviet War

Volodymyr Vasylovych Sikevych (Ukrainian: Сікевич Володимир Васильович), September 4, 1870 – July 27, 1952, was a General Khorunzhy of the Ukrainian People's Army of the Ukrainian People's Republic (UNR) during the Ukrainian-Soviet War.

== Biography ==
Volodymyr Sikevych was born in village Tarashcha, Kiev Governorate. He served as a colonel in the general staff of the Russian Imperial Army. During the Ukrainian War of Independence (1917–20) he was the brigadier general of the Army of the Ukrainian People's Republic and head of the Repatriation Commission of the UNR consulates in Hungary and Austria (1919–20). In 1924 he moved to Canada (Winnipeg and Toronto) and was active in Ukrainian veterans' organizations. Sikevych is an author of book Storinky iz zapysnoï knyzhky.
