= Vladimir Kuzmin-Karavayev =

Russian politician (1859–1927)

- Владимир Кузьмин-Караваев
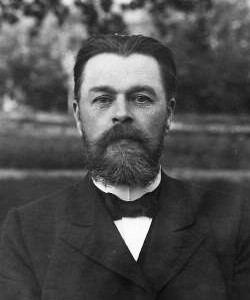

Member of the State Duma
- In office 1906–1907

Personal details
- Born: 9 September [O.S. 28 August] 1859 Boriskovo, Bezhetsky Uyezd, Tver Governorate, Russian Empire
- Died: 17 February 1927 (aged 67) Paris, France
- Relatives: brothers: Dmitry, Aglay

Vladimir Dmitriyevich Kuzmin-Karavayev (Russian: Влади́мир Дми́триевич Кузьми́н-Карава́ев; 9 September 1859 – 17 February 1927) was a Russian legal scholar and liberal politician.

== Biography ==
Graduate of His Majesty's Page Corps and of the Alexander Military Law Academy. Professor in the Military Law Academy, 1890, and in the Nicholas Academy of General Staff, 1899–1903; professor at St. Petersburg University, 1909–1913.

Active participant in zemstvo congresses, 1904–1905. One of the founders of the Party of Democratic Reform; member of St. Petersburg City Duma; member of the First and Second Dumas. Barrister in St. Petersburg Court of Appeals, 1913. He was an active member of the irregular freemasonic lodge, the Grand Orient of Russia’s Peoples.

During the Russian Civil War he was member of Yudenich's Political Conference.

Kuzmin-Karavaev died in Paris.
