= 42nd Infantry Division (Russian Empire) =

- 42-я пехотная дивизия
- Active: 1914–1918
- Country: Russian Empire
- Branch: Russian Imperial Army
- Role: Infantry

The 42nd Infantry Division (Russian: 42-я пехотная дивизия, 42-ya Pekhotnaya Diviziya) was an infantry formation of the Russian Imperial Army.

== Organization ==
The 42nd Infantry Division was part of the 9th Army Corps.

- 1st Brigade
  - 165th Infantry Regiment
  - 166th Infantry Regiment
- 2nd Brigade
  - 167th Infantry Regiment
  - 168th Infantry Regiment
- 42nd Artillery Brigade

== Commanders ==
- 1907-1913: Nikolai Epanchin
