= Georgy Vasmund =

Imperial Russian division commander

Georgy Robertovich Vasmund
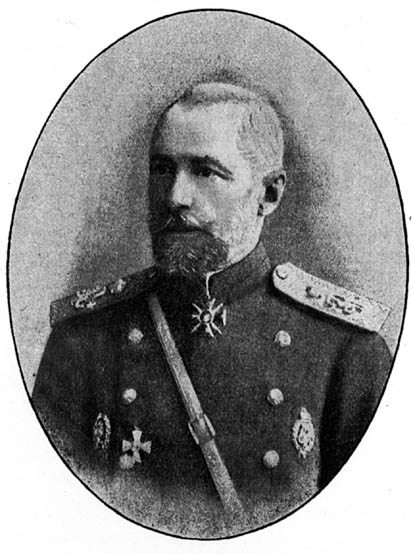
- Born: 25 December 1840
- Died: 30 May 1904 (aged 63) Bern, Switzerland
- Allegiance: Russian Empire
- Branch: Imperial Russian Army; Lieutenant general
- Commands: 1st Brigade, 1st Guards Infantry Division; 1st Guards Infantry Division
- Conflicts: January Uprising; Russo-Turkish War

Georgy Robertovich Vasmund (Russian, Георгий Робертович Васмунд, 25 December 1840 - 30 May 1904) was an Imperial Russian division commander, lieutenant general. He took part in the suppression of the uprising in Poland and the war against the Ottoman Empire. In 1877 he was made the Commander of His Majesty's Life-Guards 1st Rifle Regiment and in 1898 he was made the Chief of Staff of the Life-Guards Headquarters and the St. Petersburg Military District

== Awards ==
- Order of Saint Stanislaus (House of Romanov), 3rd class, 1863
- Order of Saint Anna, 3rd class, 1864
- Order of Saint Vladimir, 4th class, 1872
- Order of Saint Stanislaus (House of Romanov), 2nd class, 1876
- Order of Saint George, 4th degree, 1877
- Order of Saint Vladimir, 3rd class, 1878
- Gold Sword for Bravery, 1878
- Order of Saint Anna, 2nd class, 1879
- Order of Saint Stanislaus (House of Romanov), 1st class, 1889
- Order of Saint Anna, 1st class, 1892
- Order of Saint Vladimir, 2nd class, 1894
- Order of the White Eagle (Russian Empire), 1898
- Order of Saint Alexander Nevsky, 1902

Preceded by	Commander of the 1st Brigade, 1st Guards Infantry Division; 1893-1898	Succeeded by
Preceded by Oskar Grippenberg	Commander of the 1st Guards Infantry Division; 1898	Succeeded by Georgy Bobrikov
