= Vasily Nezabitovsky =

Russian scholar

- Russian: Василий Андреевич Незабитовский; Ukrainian: Василь Андрійович Незабітовський
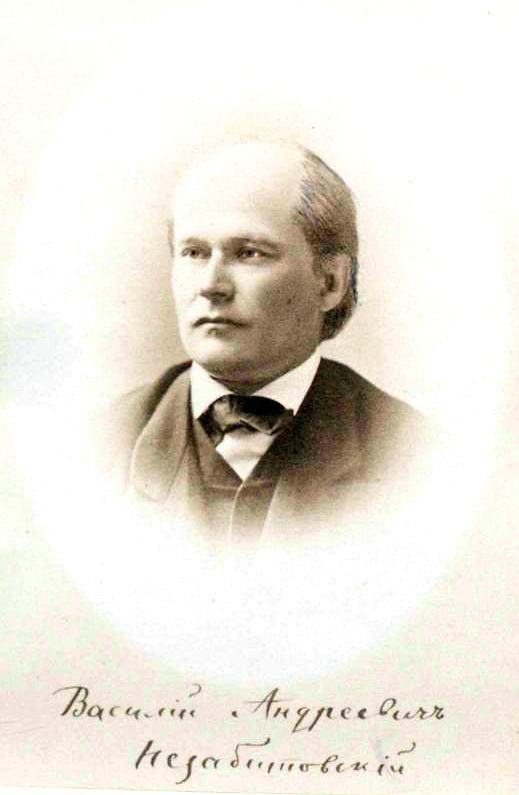
- Born: 1824
- Died: 1883 (aged 58–59)

Academic background
- Education: Kyiv University

Academic work
- Discipline: legal studies
- Main interests: international law

Vasily Andreyevich Nezabitovsky (Russian: Василий Андреевич Незабитовский; Ukrainian: Василь Андрійович Незабітовський; 1824 — 1883) was a jurist, born in Radomyshl in the Kiev Governorate of the Russian Empire (present-day Ukraine). He graduated from Kyiv University of St. Vladimir. In 1853, Nezabitovsky transferred to the faculty of international law at Kyiv University.

== Contributions ==
Nezabitovsky is best known for his study of international law and his conception of a global law versus an international law, in the sense of law between nations. Global law or general / omnisocial law meant to protect an individual against allegiance to a given government or state. Omnisocial law was thus one of the first manifestations of international human rights law. Nezabitovsky saw international law as merely the protection of state's rights vis a vis other states. Omnisocial law was meant to act as a limit on international law.
