= David Ivanovich Orlov =

Imperial Russian lieutenant general and division commander

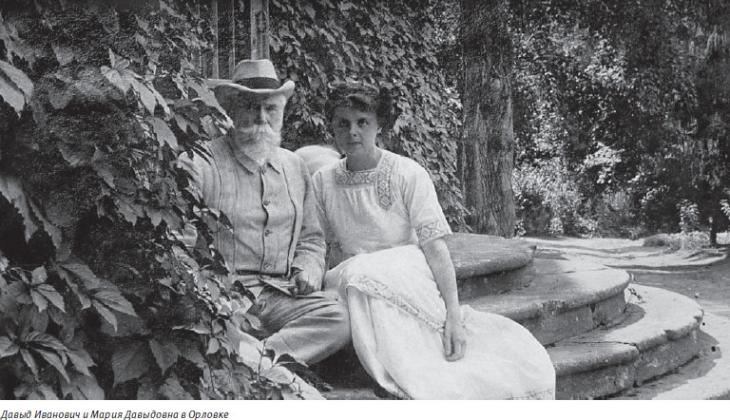
- Orlov with his daughter Mary.
- Born: 6 July 1840
- Died: 24 August 1916 (aged 76)
- Allegiance: Russian Empire
- Service / branch: Imperial Russian Army
- Commands: 12th Cavalry Division; 1st Don Cossack Division
- Battles / wars: January Uprising; Russo-Turkish War

David (Davyd) Ivanovich Orlov (Russian: Давид (Давыд) Иванович Орлов; 6 July 1840 – 24 August 1916) was an Imperial Russian lieutenant general and division commander. His son Ivan (1870–1918) married Elena de Struve, daughter of Karl von Struve. His daughter Varvara Davydovna (1870–1915) married the son of Illarion Ivanovich Vorontsov-Dashkov.

== Awards ==
- Order of Saint Anna, 4th class, 1863
- Order of Saint Anna, 3rd class, 1866
- Order of Saint Stanislaus (House of Romanov), 2nd class, 1869
- Order of Saint Anna, 2nd class, 1872
- Order of Saint Vladimir, 3rd class, 1877
- Gold Sword for Bravery, 1877
- Order of Saint Stanislaus (House of Romanov), 1881
- Order of Saint Anna, 1st class, 1883
- Order of Saint Vladimir, 2nd class, 1885
- Order of the White Eagle (Russian Empire), 1897

Preceded by Alexander Mikhailovich Lermontov	Commander of the 12th Cavalry Division; 1896–1898	Succeeded by Sergei Vasilchikov
Preceded by Ivan Alexeyevich Andriyanov	Commander of the 1st Don Cossack Division; 1898–1900	Succeeded by Hippolyte Apollonovich Pozdeev

== Sources ==
- Милорадович Г. А. Список лиц свиты их величеств с царствования императора Петра I по 1886 год. Чернигов, 1886, с.88.
- Список генералам по старшинству. Составлен по 1 мая 1901. СПб., с.205.
- Список генералам по старшинству. Часть I, II и III. Составлен по 1-е января 1910. СПб., 1910, с. 114.
- Д. И. Орлов
