= List of Russian aviators =

This list of Russian and Soviet aviators includes the noteworthy aviators of the Russian Empire, the Soviet Union and the Russian Federation. The majority of pilots listed here served in the Imperial Russian Air Force, the Soviet Air Force or the modern Russian Air Force (or continue to serve in the latter).

The aircrew members listed below either performed notable feats in aviation, held senior positions in Russian military aviation, and/or received national or international decorations for their aviation service.

== Alphabetical list ==
=== A ===
- Vsevolod Abramovich, pioneer aviator killed on crash, inventor of Abramovich Flyer
- Sergey Anokhin, Soviet test pilot, Hero of the Soviet Union
- Pavel Argeyev, Russia's third most successful fighter ace during World War I in Russia and France

=== B ===
- Yekaterina Budanova, World War II pilot, one of the world's two female fighter aces

=== C ===
- Valery Chkalov, flew the first transcontinental flight by airplane over the North Pole, Hero of the Soviet Union

=== D ===
- Mikhail Devyatayev, World War II flying ace, awarded the Order of Lenin, Order of Red Banner, Order of the Patriotic War and Hero of the Soviet Union
- Mariya Dolina, female dive bomber pilot, Hero of the Soviet Union

=== F ===
- Viktor Federov, flying ace, received the Légion d'honneur and two other French decorations during World War I

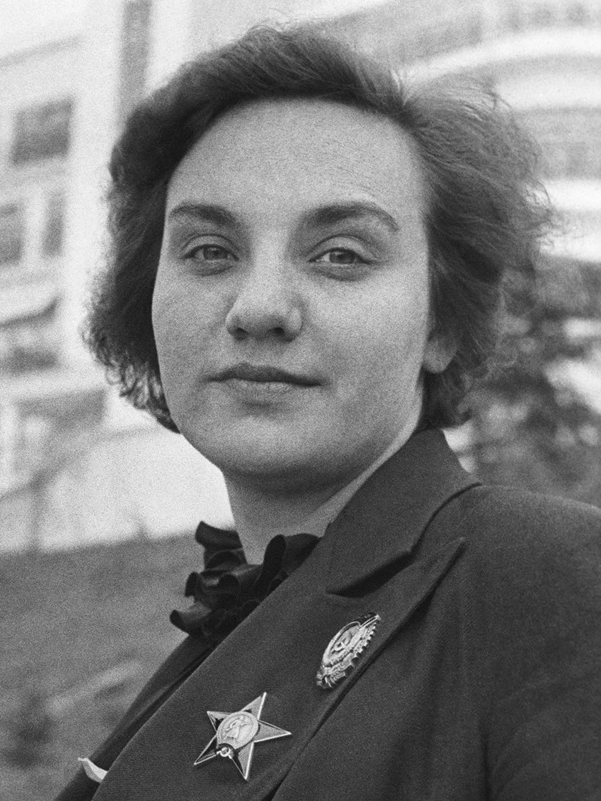
Grizodubova

=== G ===
- Nikolai Gastello, the first Soviet pilot to direct his burning aircraft at a ground target, Hero of the Soviet Union
- Polina Gelman, World War II bomber pilot, one of the Night Witches, Hero of the Soviet Union
- Juri Gilsher, World War I flying ace amputee, awarded four decorations for valor
- Alexander Golovanov, Chief Marshal of Aviation at the end of World War II, Commander of Long Range Aviation
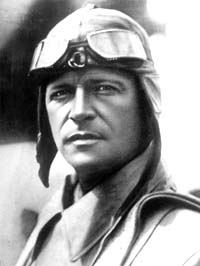
  Gromov
- Sergey Gritsevets, fighter ace during the Spanish Civil War and the Battle of Khalkhin Gol, & the first to be recognised twice as Hero of the Soviet Union
- Valentina Grizodubova, one of the first Soviet female pilots and Heroes of the Soviet Union, set a record for woman's ultralong flights
- Mikhail Gromov, set a record during the transcontinental flight over the North Pole, founded the Gromov Flight Research Institute, Hero of the Soviet Union

=== I ===
- Vladimir Ilyushin, test pilot for OKB Sukhoi, Hero of the Soviet Union

=== K ===
- Nikolai Kamanin, polar aviator, among the first to be decorated as Hero of the Soviet Union, trained the first ever cosmonauts, including Yuri Gagarin, Gherman Titov and Alexei Leonov
- Rafael Kaprelyan, test pilot, holder of 10 world records for helicopters, Hero of the Soviet Union
- Alexander Kazakov, the most successful Russian flying ace of World War I, the first to perform an aerial ramming and survive
- Timofey Khryukin, fighter ace during Spanish Civil War, Second Sino-Japanese War and World War II, double Hero of the Soviet Union
- Sergei Khudyakov, Marshal of Aviation during World War II, chief of staff of the Soviet Air Force
- Vladimir Kokkinaki, test pilot, set twenty-two world records, later President of the Fédération Aéronautique Internationale, Hero of the Soviet Union (twice)
- Nikolai Kokorin, World War I flying ace, winner of three awards for valor
- Zinaïda Kokorina, pilot and flight instructor, in 1925 became the world's first military pilot
- Galina Gavrilovna Korchuganova, test pilot and first women's world aerobatics champion
- Ivan Kozhedub, Allied "Ace of Aces" in World War II, credited with sixty-four victories, three-time Order of Lenin earner
- Sergei Kramarenko, fighter ace in World War II and the Korean War, Hero of the Soviet Union
- Stepan Kretov, long-range bomber pilot during World War II, double Hero of the Soviet Union
- Yevgraph Kruten, World War I fighter ace flew for, and won decorations from, both Imperial Russian and French Air Forces
- Nikolai Kuimov, chief test pilot for Ilyushin, Hero of the Russian Federation
- Pavel Kutakhov, World War II fighter ace, Chief Marshal of Aviation during the Leonid Brezhnev era, double Hero of the Soviet Union

=== L ===
- Ernst Leman, World War I flying ace, recipient of four gallantry medals
- Sigismund Levanevsky, polar aviator, among the first to receive the honour of Hero of the Soviet Union, died in a transpolar flight attempt
- Anatoly Liapidevsky, polar aviator, the first person to receive the honour of Hero of the Soviet Union, General Major of Aviation
- Lydia Litvyak, World War II pilot, one of the world's two female fighter aces, Hero of the Soviet Union
- Ivan Loiko, World War I flying ace, recipient of five awards for valor

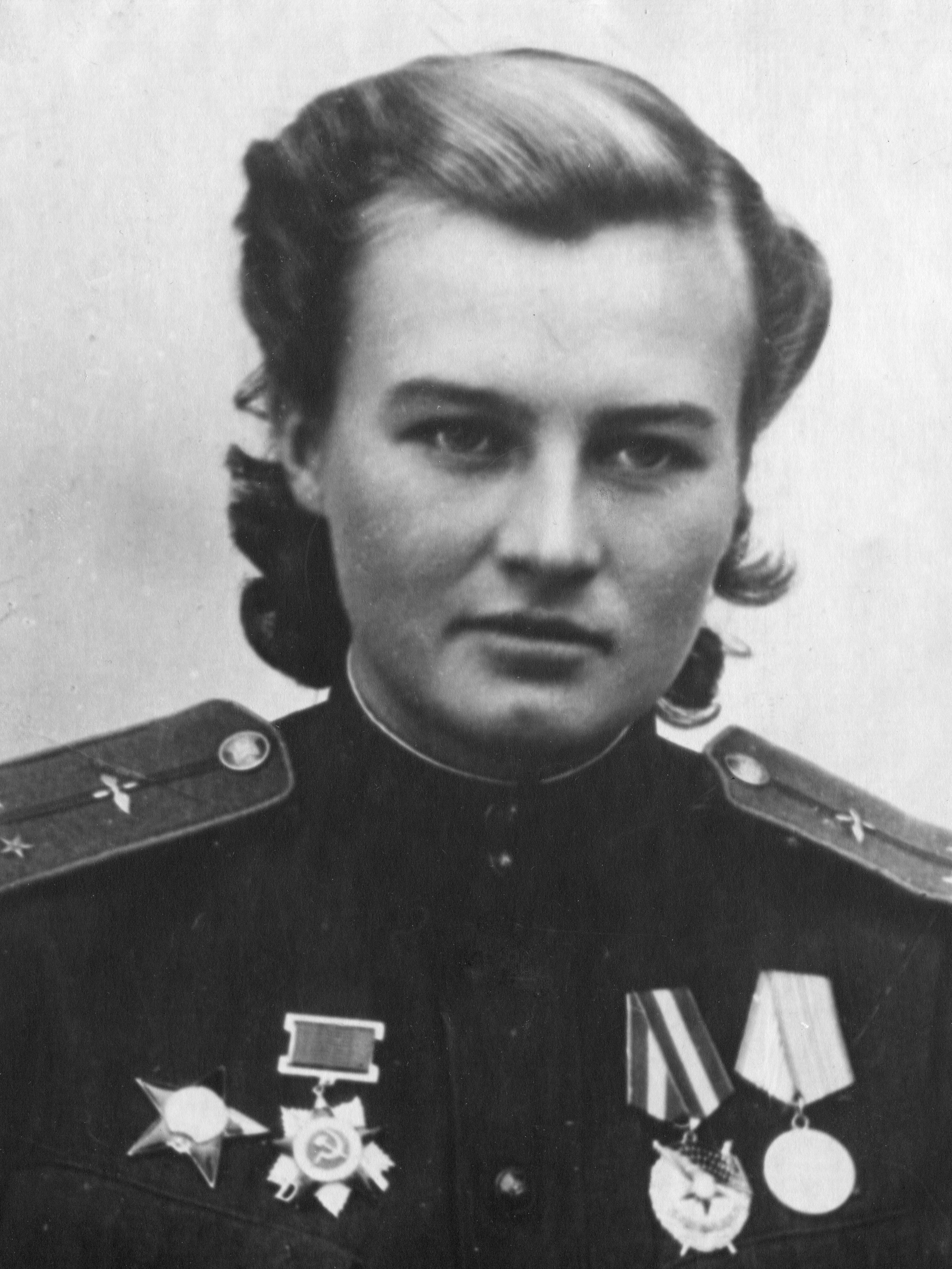
Meklin

=== M ===
- Donat Makijonek, flying ace of the Imperial Russian Air Service in World War I and recipient of 15 decorations for valor
- Alexey Maresyev, World War II fighter ace, Hero of the Soviet Union, the prototype for The Story of a Real Man
- Natalya Meklin, World War II bomber pilot & one of the Night Witches, Hero of the Soviet Union

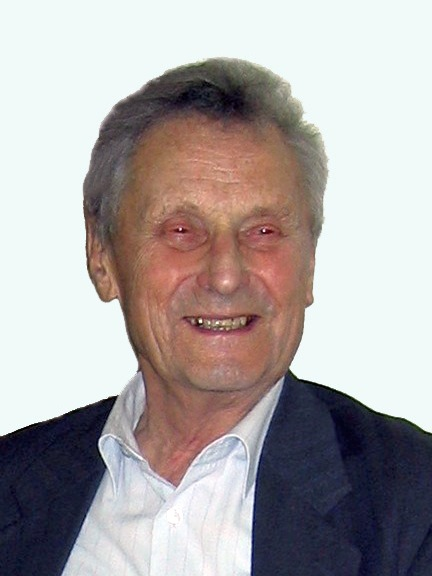
Mironov

- Arseny Mironov, aerospace engineer and aviator, scientist in aircraft aerodynamics and flight testing
- Vasily Molokov, polar aviator, among the first to receive the honour of Hero of the Soviet Union, General Major of Aviation

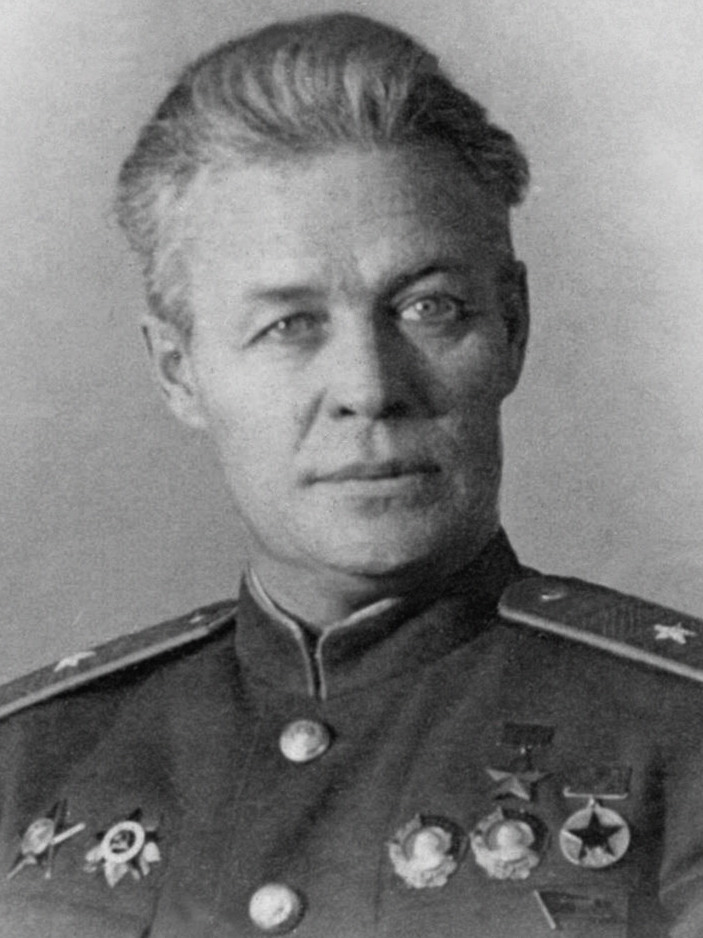
Molokov

=== N ===
- Ivan Nagurski, first polar aviator
- Pyotr Nesterov, inventor and pioneer of aerobatics, the first pilot to perform the aerobatic loop, died while scoring the world's first air combat victory by aerial ramming an Austrian plane during World War I
- Alexander Novikov, Chief Marshal of Aviation during World War II, double Hero of the Soviet Union
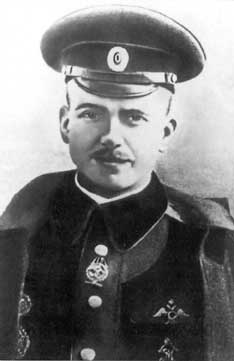
  Nesterov

=== O ===
- Prince Alexander Obolensky, "the Flying Slav", Russian émigré World War II RAF pilot
- Ivan Orlov, World War I flying ace, served with, and received decorations for valor from both the Imperial Russian and French governments
- Vasily Osipov, World War II bomber pilot, double Hero of the Soviet Union

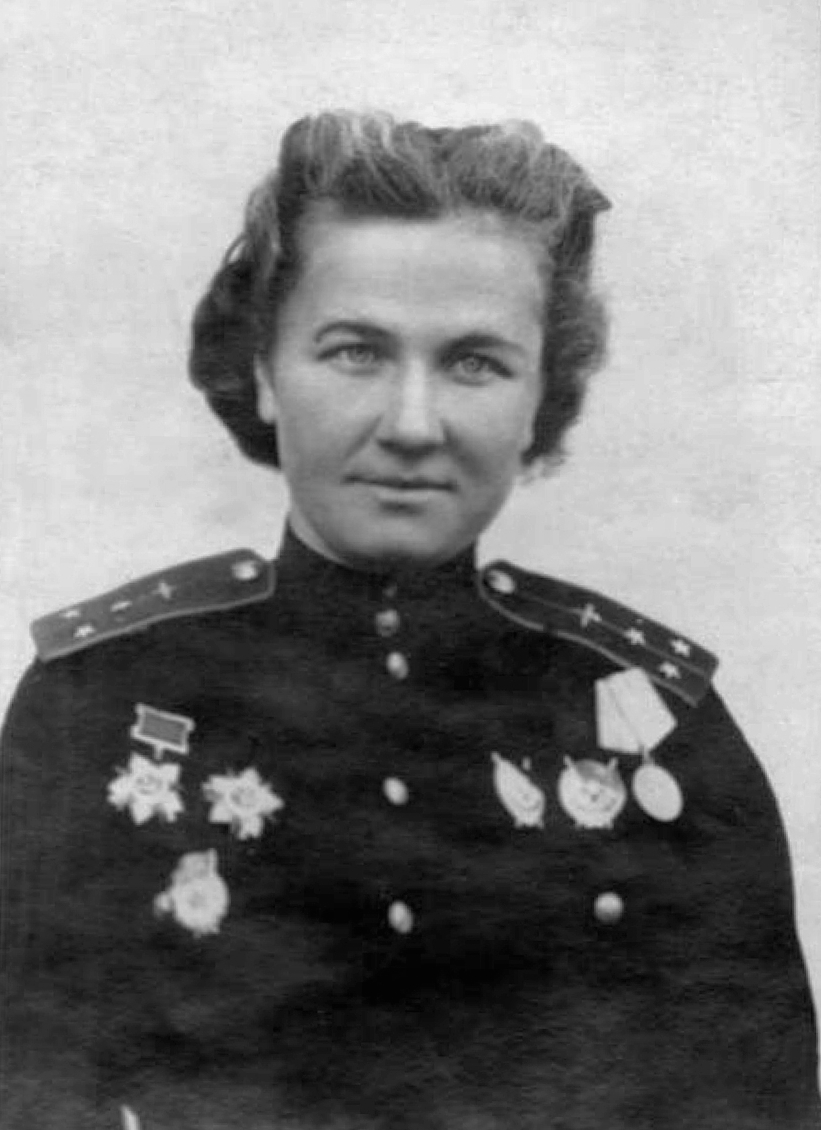
Popova

=== P ===
- Yevgeny Pepelyaev, top Soviet fighter ace in the Korean War, Hero of the Soviet Union
- Alexander Pishvanov, World War I flying ace, recipient of five decorations for valor
- Viktor Pokrovsky, World War I flying ace, the first Russian pilot to capture an enemy plane and pilot
- Alexander Pokryshkin, World War II fighter ace, credited with 59 individual victories, thrice Hero of the Soviet Union, Marshal of Aviation
- Nadezhda Popova, Squadron Leader in the Night Witches
- Vitaly Popkov, one of the top World War II fighter aces, credited with 41 individual victories, double Hero of the Soviet Union
- Alexander Prokofiev de Seversky, World War I naval aviator, Russian-American aviation pioneer and inventor
- Georgy Prokofiev, balloonist who coordinated military stratospheric balloon program in 1930s, set world record in altitude on USSR-1
- Viktor Pugachyov, test pilot and pioneer of supermaneuverability, the first to show Pugachev's Cobra maneuver of Su-27
- Eduard Pulpe, World War I flying ace, recipient of awards for valor from both the Imperial Russian and French governments
- Endel Puusepp, long-range bomber pilot, famous for flying a Soviet delegation over the front line from Moscow to Washington D.C. and back to negotiate the opening of the Western Front, Hero of the Soviet Union

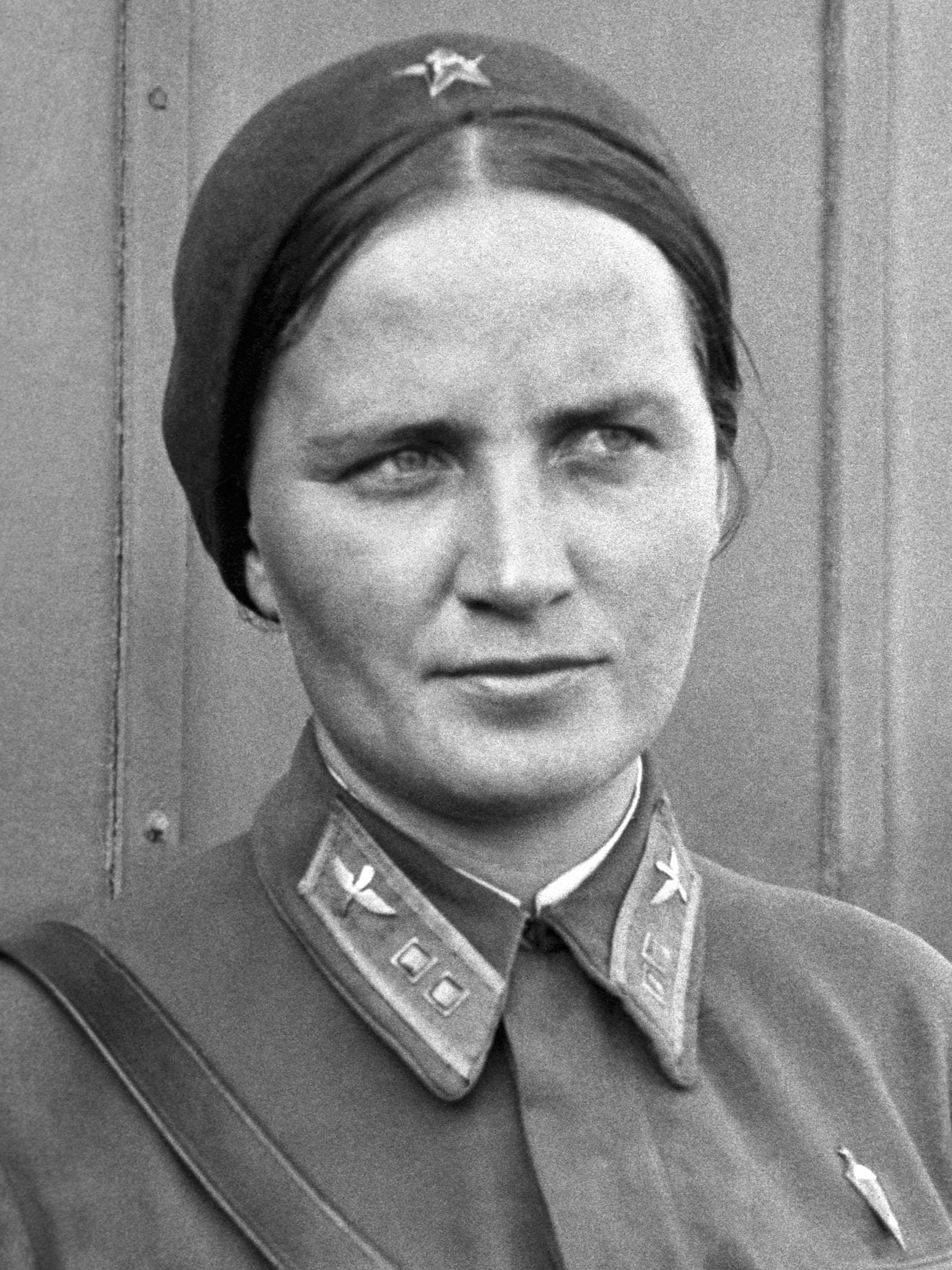
Raskova

=== R ===
- Marina Raskova, navigator, founder of the three female air regiments during World War II, Hero of the Soviet Union
- Grigoriy Rechkalov, one of the top World War II fighter aces, credited with 56 individual victories, double Hero of the Soviet Union
- Yevgeniya Rudneva, senior navigator of the Night Witches, Hero of the Soviet Union

=== S ===
- Mikhail Safonov, World War I flying ace, recipient of two decorations for valor
- Yevgeniy Savitskiy, World War II fighter ace, Marshal of Aviation, double Hero of the Soviet Union
- Irina Sebrova, World War II bomber pilot, one of the Night Witches, Hero of the Soviet Union
- Yevgeniya Shakhovskaya, the first woman military pilot
- Lev Shestakov, top Soviet fighter ace during the Spanish Civil War, Hero of the Soviet Union
- Mark Shevelev, Commander of Soviet Polar aviation during World War II, Hero of the Soviet Union
- Ivan Smirnov, recipient of five Russian and two foreign military decorations, fourth ranking fighter ace of the Imperial Russian Air Service during World War I
- Yakov Smushkevich, Commander of the Soviet aviation in the Spanish Civil War and in the Battle of Khalkhin Gol, double Hero of the Soviet Union
- Nelson Stepanyan, World War II dive bomber pilot, destroyed scores of enemy ships, tanks, cars, planes and guns, double Hero of the Soviet Union
- Vladimir Strizhesky, recipient of the Cross of St. George and the Order of the Crown of Romania, victor of seven aerial battles during World War I
- Amet-khan Sultan, World War II fighter ace, double Hero of the Soviet Union, test pilot who died in a plane crash

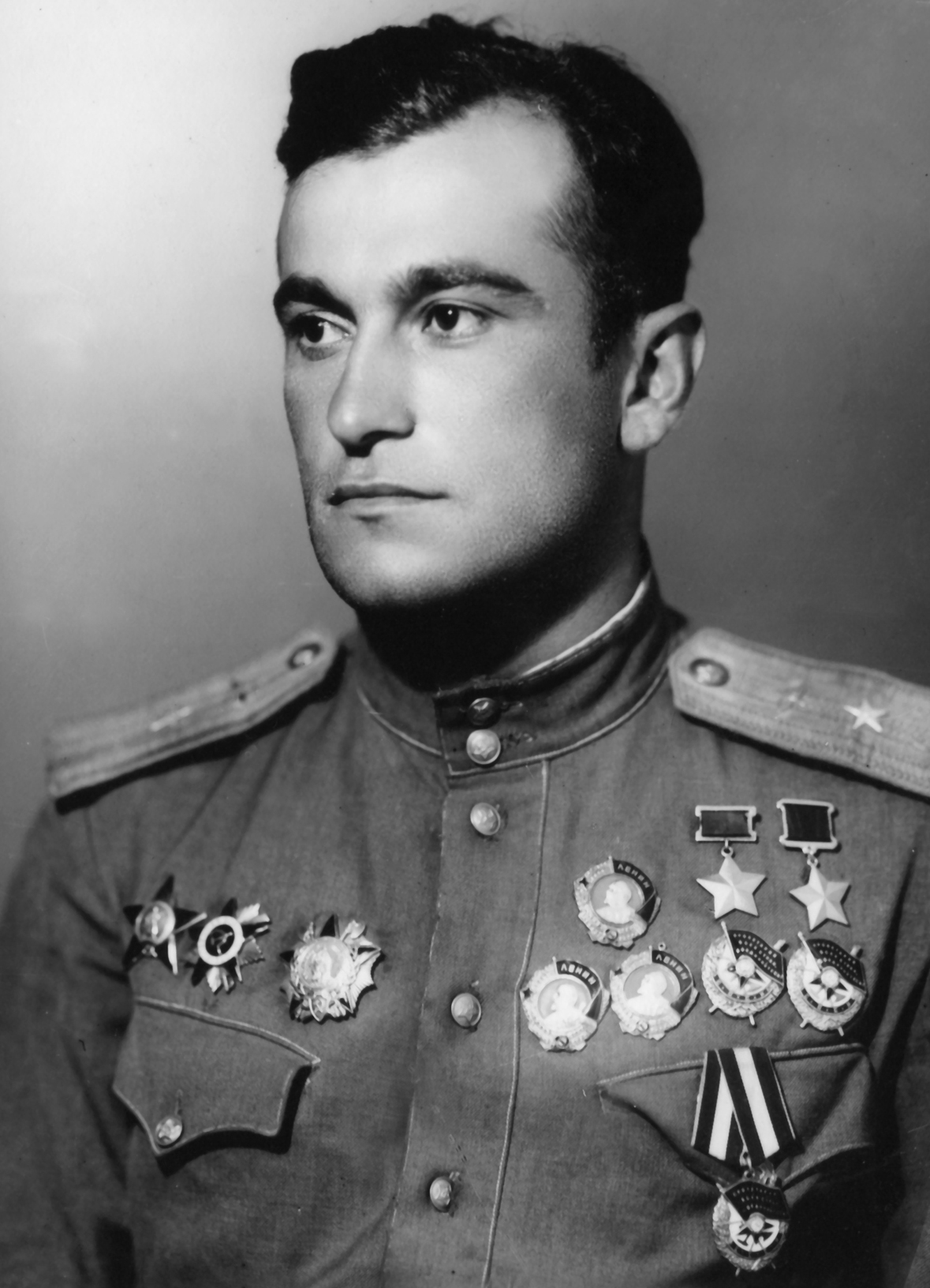
Sultan

- Nikolay Sutyagin, top Korean War Soviet fighter ace, Hero of the Soviet Union

=== T ===
- Victor Talalikhin, World War II fighter ace, among the first to perform aerial ramming at night, Hero of the Soviet Union
- Igor Tkachenko, Commander of the Russian Knights

=== V ===
- Konstantin Vakulovsky, World War I fighter ace, recipient of three gallantry awards
- Andrey Vitruk, World War II fighter ace, General Major of Aviation, honoured as Hero of the Soviet Union and Hero of Yugoslavia
- Pavel Vlasov, test pilot, Hero of the Russian Federation

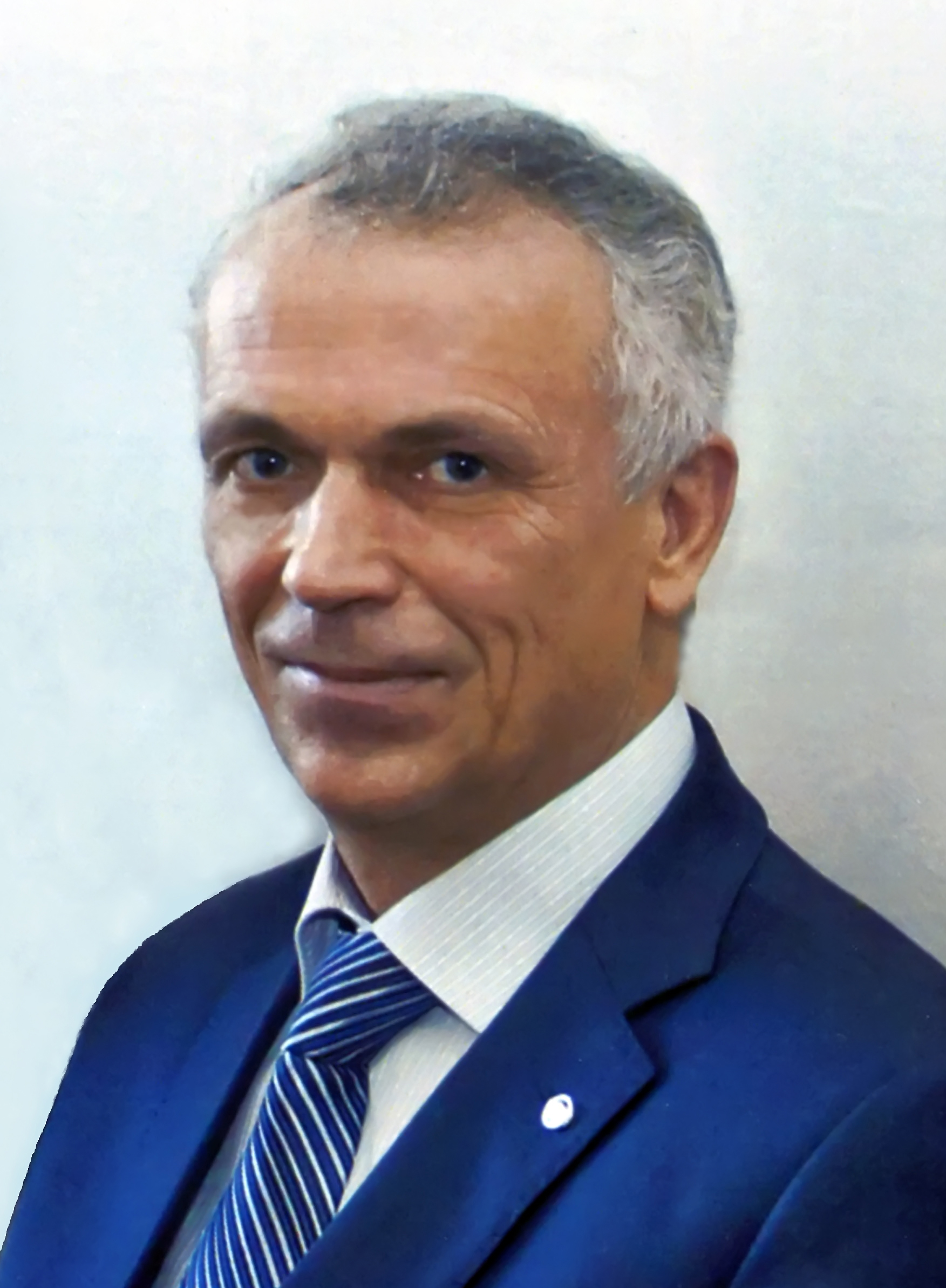
Vlasov

- Igor Volk, test pilot, cosmonaut, Hero of the Soviet Union

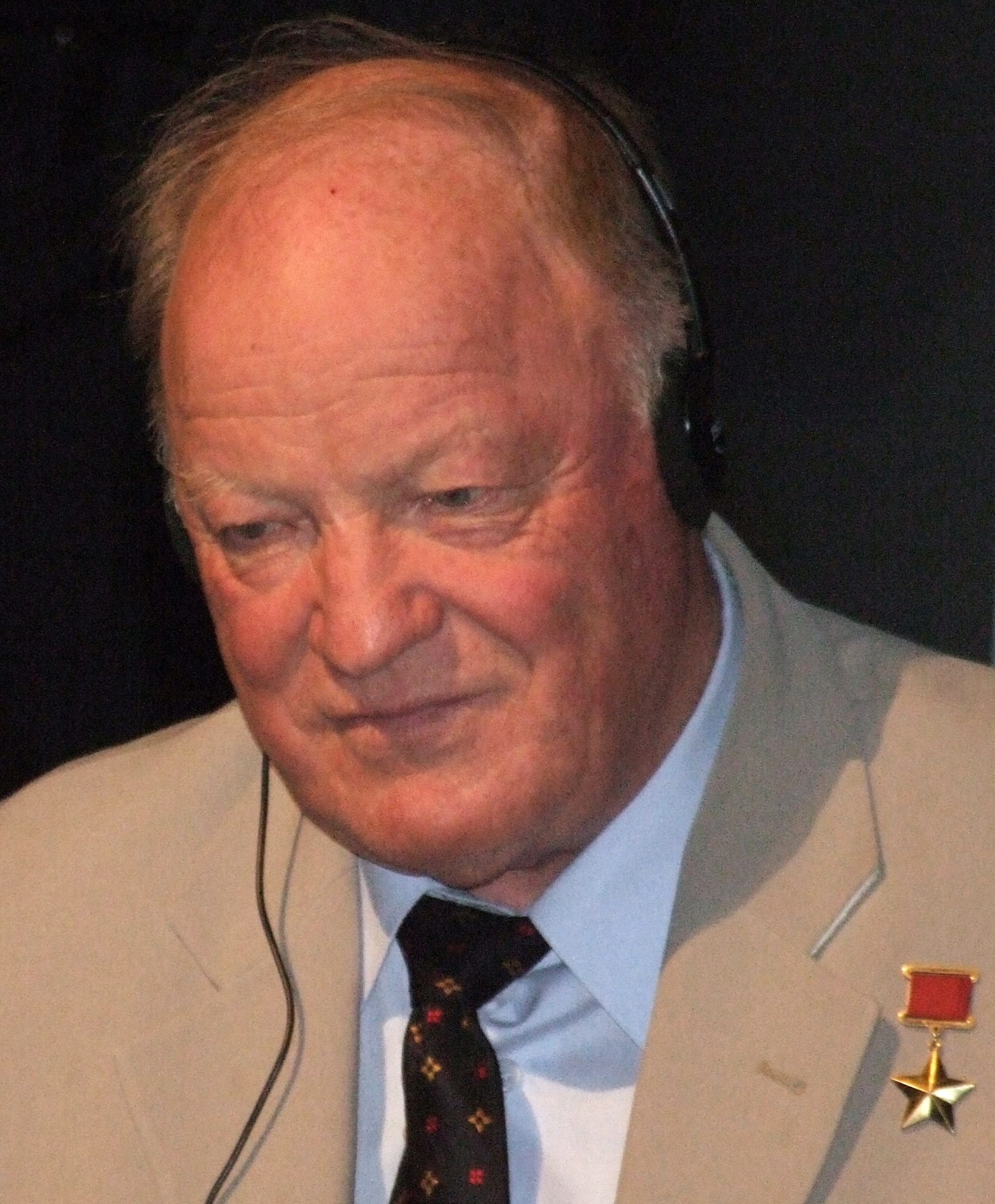
Volk

- Mikhail Vodopyanov, polar aviator, Hero of the Soviet Union, commanded the first Soviet air raid on Berlin in 1941

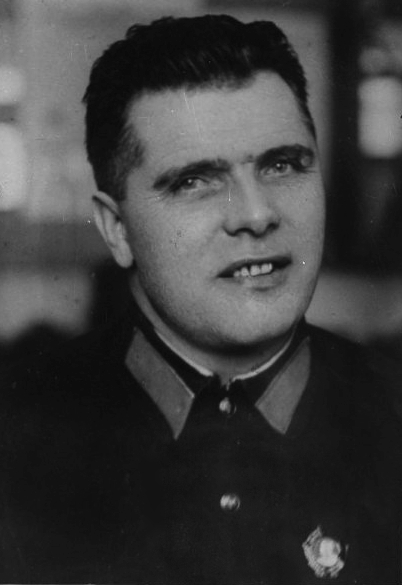
Vodopyanov

=== Y ===
- Vasili Yanchenko, second-scoring Russian flying ace of World War I
- Anna Yegorova, World War II bomber pilot, Nazi concentration camp survivor, Hero of the Soviet Union
- Ruben Yesayan, test pilot, Hero of the Russian Federation
- Kirill Yevstigneev, one of the top World War II fighter aces, credited with 53 individual victories, double Hero of the Soviet Union

=== Z ===
- Yekaterina Zelenko, World War II pilot, the only woman ever alleged to have to have performed an aerial ramming, Hero of the Soviet Union

== See also ==
- List of aviators
- List of cosmonauts
- List of World War II aces from the Soviet Union
