= Pesya =

Pesya or Pesia (Russian: Песя) is an Eastern Ashkenazi feminine given name, a diminutive of Paulina or Polina. Ist hypocoristic/baby form is Pes(s)ele(h). The name gave rise to the Jewish matronymic surname Pesin.

A number of notable Jews had family members with the name Pesya, including Naftoli Trop, Mikhail Abramovich, Mikhail Goldstein, Boris Goldstein, Moshe Soloveichik, Asher Weiss, Yitzchak Meir Alter, Vilna Gaon Elijah ben Solomon Zalman, Gershon Edelstein, Yitzhak Perlstein, Sholom Rivkin, Mendele Mocher Sforim, etc.

Notable people with the name include:

- Pesya Faerman, birth name of Laura Hidalgo (1927–2005), Argentine actress
- Pesya Epstein, birth name of Pauline Wengeroff
- Pesya Giberman, birth name of Polina Lurie-Giberman (1862– after 1916), Russian doctor and ttranslator of medical literature

== Fictional characters ==
- Aunt Pesya in Russian TV series Liquidation
