= Vladimir Strzhizhevsky =

Russian flying ace (1894–1940)

Vladimir Ivanovich Strzhizhevsky (alternate spellings: Strizhevsky, Strishzhevskii)
- Born: 26 December 1894; Mogilev, Russian Empire (located in present day Belarus)
- Died: 22 August 1940 (aged 45); Medak
- Burial place: Belgrade New Cemetery
- Military career
- Allegiance: Russia; Kingdom of Yugoslavia
- Branch: Imperial Russian Air Service; Red Air Force; White Air Force; Royal Yugoslav Air Force
- Service years: 1914-1917 (IRAS); 1918 (Red Air Force); 1919-1920 (White Air Force); 1920 onwards (RYAF)
- Rank: Captain
- Units: 16th Corps Air Detachment, 9th Corps Fighter Detachment, 10th Corps Fighter Detachment
- Awards: Cross of Saint George All four classes; Order of Saint Anna Fourth Class "For Bravery"; Order of Saint George Fourth Class; Order of Saint Vladimir Fourth Class with Swords and Ribbon; Kingdom of Romania's Order of the Crown with Swords
- Other work: Joined Yugoslavian air force and became Yugoslav citizen

Captain Vladimir Ivanovich Strzhizhevsky (26 December 1894 – 22 August 1940) was a World War I flying ace. He volunteered for military service on 14 October 1914, after graduation from Petrograd Technical Institute. Incomplete and confusing records credit him with eight confirmed and four unconfirmed aerial victories during his 1916-1917 combat on the Romanian Front. His second wound ended his tally of aerial victories. The advent of the October Revolution saw him co-opted into the Red Air Force for the end of the war. On 4 November 1918, he defected to the White Russian Army, and served with them for two years. When they were expelled from Russia, Strzhizhevsky accompanied them. He became a Yugoslav citizen and joined their air force.

== Biography ==
Vladimir Ivanovich Strzhizhevsky was born into gentry on 26 December 1894 in Mogilev. He was raised in the Russian Orthodox faith. He attended Petrograd Technical Institute, majoring in electro-mechanical engineering, until volunteering for military service on 14 October 1914. Four days later, he began training in the theory of aviation at the Saint Petersburg Polytechnical Institute. He graduated on 2 January 1915, and was forwarded to Gatchinsky Military Air Force School for practical training.

After aviation training, he graduated from Flying School in Sevastopol on 29 July 1915. His initial posting was to the 16th Korpusnoi Aviatsionniy Otryad (Corps Aviation Detachment) on 10 August 1915. He arrived at the 16th KAO on 5 September; on 14 September 1915, he was promoted to Podporuchik. By January 1916, Strzhizhevsky had flown 43 combat sorties for a flight time of 65 hours 44 minutes. During this period, he was awarded all four classes of the Cross of Saint George and promoted to Praporshchik on 10 February 1916.

On 9 March 1916, while on patrol, Strzhizhevsky's aircraft engine failed and brought him down into a crashlanding. The machine was a write-off, and Strzhizhevsky suffered serious injuries to his right leg and face. He was hospitalized until 24 June 1916, and sent for physical therapy in Odessa until July. He would not return to battle until 24 August 1916, when he joined the 9th Aviatsionniy Otryad Istrebitlei (Fighter Aviation Detachment). His first assignment there was to run the photo lab; it may have been in deference to his health issues. At any rate, he did not fly again until December 1916. Over the next three months, he gradually flew a slowly increasing number of missions as his health improved. When the combined Austro-Hungarian and German forces broke open the Romanian front in early 1917, the 9th Fighter Aviation Detachment moved its base to Săucești. From this airfield, only 13 kilometers behind their own fighting lines, Strzhizhevsky gained his aerial successes and was awarded the Fourth Class Order of Saint George for his bravery. On 17 March 1917, he scored his first aerial victory. He would score three more times in April 1917, twice while on escort missions and once while on patrol. His victory tally ended on 18 July 1917, when he was hit in the right leg by two bullets while engaging the enemy and shooting down Augustin Novák. When Strzhizhevsky returned to base, he was again medically evacuated. He had never been recommended for honors by his squadron commander, Ivan Loiko; however the Romanians bequeathed him their Order of the Crown.

Strzhizhevsky returned to his unit in late September or early October 1917. In October, he flew only four sorties, all in a new Spad VII, serial number S1435. He was then transferred to the 10th Fighter Aviation Detachment. On 11 November 1917, he was promoted to Podporuchik.

As the October Revolution threw the Russian war effort into chaos, Strzhizhevsky was co-opted into the Red Air Force as the commander of the First Voronezh Aviation Group. However, on 4 November 1918, he deserted across the lines to join the White Russian Army; he also served in the Armed Forces of South Russia. On 21 July 1920, he was promoted to Captain. In November 1920, he left Russia with the fleeing White Army. From the Crimea, he found his way to the Kingdom of Yugoslavia and joined their air force.

Vladimir Ivanovich Strzhizhevsky died at South Velebit's Visočica Peak on 22 August 1940. He was buried in the Belgrade's New Cemetery.

== List of aerial victories ==
Most aviation historians list seven confirmed victories for Strzhizhevsky; the most recent text states five. The below list is a compilation of his victory claims. Confirmed victories are numbered and listed chronologically. Unconfirmed victories are denoted by "u/c".

See also Aerial victory standards of World War I, List of World War I flying aces from the Russian Empire

No.	Date/time	Aircraft	Foe	Result	Location	Notes
u/c	9 November 1915	Morane-Saulnier L serial number MS496	Enemy observation balloon	Dropped bombs and flechettes	Southwest of Vaga	Balloon sagged to ground
u/c	20 February 1916	Morane-Saulnier MS507	Enemy aircraft	Forced down	Zastaki	
1	17 March 1917	Nieuport 21 s/n N1719	Enemy aircraft	Fell out of sight	Herzh region (Oituz River Valley)	Russian ground troops reported aircraft impact close behind opposing lines
2	11 April 1917	Spad VII s/n 1446	LVG C-Class two-seater	Set afire	Siret, Kingdom of Romania	Crashed in trenches of the Romanian 5th Infantry Division
u/c	16 April 1917 @ 0915 hours	Spad VII s/n 1446	Hansa-Brandenburg D.I			
3	17 April 1917	Nieuport 17 s/n 1448	Enemy aircraft	Spun down into forest	Racoasa	
4	23 April 1917	Nieuport 17 s/n N1448	LVG C-Class two-seater	Crashlanded near Russian troops	Vicinity of Siret	Aircrew from Flieger-Abteilung 42 captured
u/c	11 May 1917	Nieuport 17 s/n N1448	Enemy aircraft	Bogda-Neshti		
5	17 May 1917	Spad VII s/n 1446	Hansa-Brandenburg D.I	Crashed	Bacau, Kingdom of Romania	Air crew killed in action
6	17 June 1917 @ 1230 hours	Spad VII	Fokker Eindekker		Usa River Valley	
7	18 June 1917	Nieuport 17 s/n N1448	Hansa-Brandenburg C.I s/n 67.54	Crashed into ravine; destroyed	West of Poiana Uzului	Aircrew from Austro-Hungarian Fliegerkompanie 39 captured
8	18 July 1917	Nieuport 17 s/n N1448	Enemy two-seater/Hansa-Brandenburg C.I s/n 67.52	Forced landing behind own lines	Near Magyaros	Observer KIA; pilot WIA/with Loiko

== Honors and awards ==
- Cross of Saint George All four classes
- Order of Saint Anna Fourth Class "For Bravery": March 1917
- Order of Saint George Fourth Class: 12 July 1917
- Order of Saint Vladimir Fourth Class with Swords and Bow: 19 November 1917
- Kingdom of Romania's Order of the Crown with Swords
