= Mikhail Safonov =

Mikhail Safonov may refer to:

- Mikhail Safonov (pilot) (1893–1924), Russian pilot
- Mikhail Safonov (diver) (born 1947), Russian Olympic diver
