= List of World War I flying aces from Russia =

This is a list of World War I flying aces from Russia. All aces served in the (Imperial) Russian Air Force unless otherwise noted.

English name	Russian name	No. of victories	Birthplace	Notes
Alexander Kazakov	Александр Александрович Казаков	20	Kherson Governorate	
Vasili Yanchenko	Василий Иванович Янченко	16	Nikolsk-Ussuriski	
Pavel Argeyev	Павел Владимирович Аргеев	15	Yalta	Served in the French Aéronautique Militaire as well as the Imperial Russian Air Force
Ivan Smirnov	Иван Васильевич Смирнов	11	Vladimir Governorate	
Grigory Eduardovich Suk, alias Grigory Suk	Григорий Эдуардович Сук	10	Rassudovo	
Ivan Loiko, alias Ivan Loyko	Иван Александрович Лойко	8	Minsk	
Donat Makijonek	Донат Адамович Макеенок	8	Vitebsk Region	
Vladimir Strzhizhevsky	Владимир Иванович Стрижевский	8	Mogilev	
Yevgraph Kruten	Евграф Николаевич Крутень	7	Kiev	Served in the French Aéronautique Militaire as well as the Imperial Russian Air Force
Alexander P. de Seversky	Александр Николаевич Прокофьев-Северский	6	Tiflis	
Konstantin Vakulovsky	Константин Константинович Вакуловский	6	Dagestan, Russian Turkestan	
Jaan Mahlapuu	Ян Махлапу	5 or 6	Valga, Russian Estonia	
Victor Fyodorov, alias Viktor or Victor Federov, Fedoroff, or Fyodoroff	Виктор Георгиевич Фёдоров	5	Almaty	Served primarily in the French Aéronautique Militaire
Juri Gilsher	Юрий Владимирович Гильшер	5	Moscow	
Nikolay Kokorin	Николай Кириллович Кокорин	5	Khlebnikovo	
Ernst Leman	Эрнст Крисланович Леман	5	Latvia	
Ivan Alexandrovich Orlov	Иван Александрович Орлов	5	Saint Petersburg	
Alexander Pishvanov	Александр Михайлович Пишванов	5	Novocherkassk	
Eduard Pulpe	Эдуард Мартынович Пульпе	5	Riga	Scored victories while in the French Aéronautique Militaire
Mikhail Safonov	Михаил Иванович Сафонов	5	Ostrogozhsk	
Viktor Utgof	Виктор Викторович Утгоф	5	Novoradansk	Imperial Russian Navy aviation of the Black Sea Fleet
