= Abramovich Flyer =

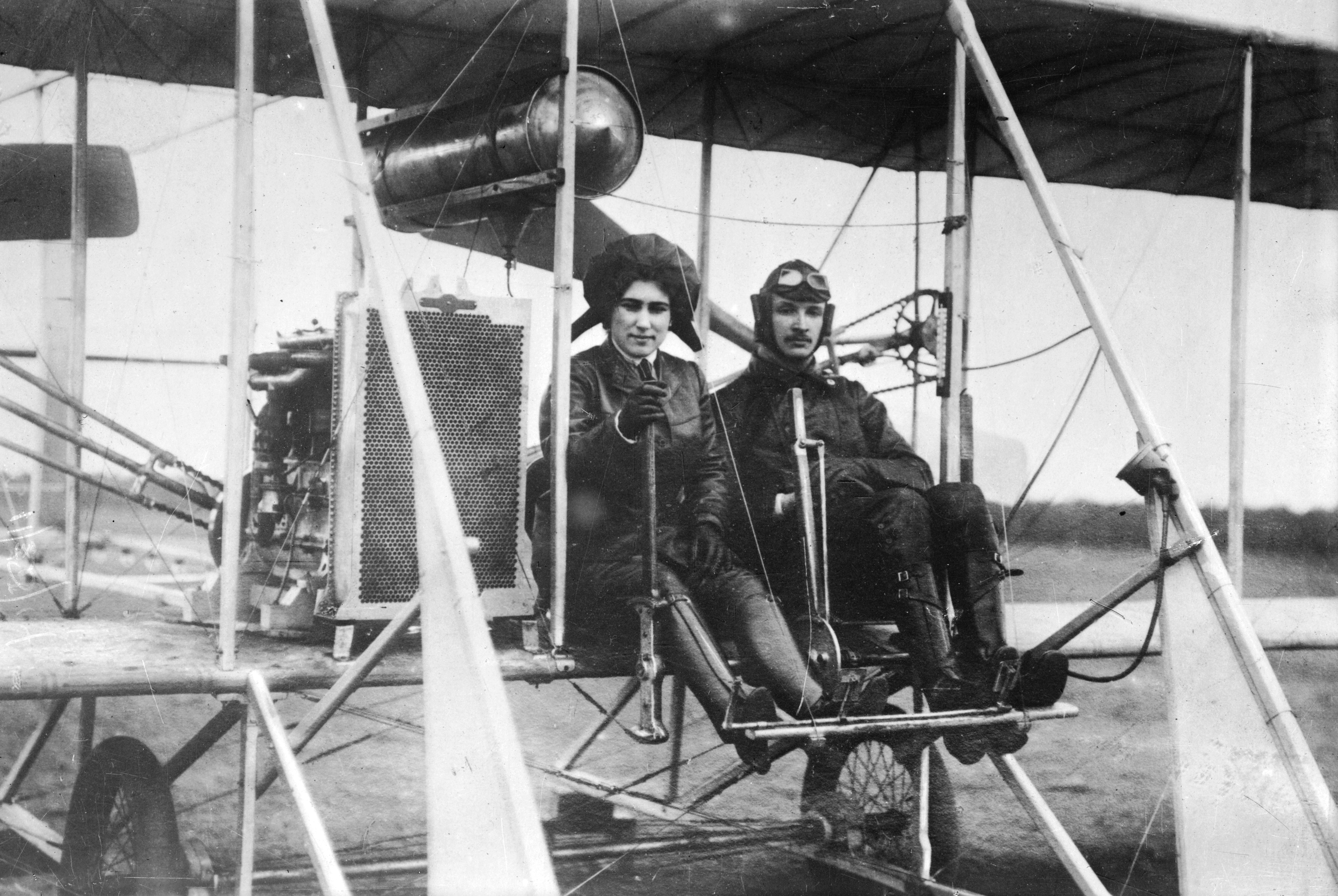
- Eugenia Mikhailovna Shakhovskaya and Vsevolod Mikhailovich Abramovich in 1913

General information
- Type: Pioneer aircraft
- National origin: Russia
- Manufacturer: Vsevolod Mikhailovich Abramovich

History
- Introduction date: 1912

The Abramovich Flyer was an early aircraft built by Russian aviator Vsevolod Mikhailovich Abramovich in 1912, based on the Wright brothers' designs he had seen while working for their German subsidiary. Differences from the Wright designs of the time included wheeled undercarriage and conventional empennage replacing the canard the Wrights used. Abramovich retained the wing warping technique the Wrights used for banking the aircraft, but controlled this with a control stick rather than the hip-controlled harness of the Wrights' design. Using this aircraft, Abramovich was successful in setting many early aviation records in Russia, including carrying several passengers.

== Specifications ==
General characteristics

- Crew: 1
- Capacity: 1
- Length: 8.3 m (27 ft 3 in)
- Wingspan: 11.8 m (38 ft 9 in)
- Wing area: 50 m^{2} (540 sq ft)
- Empty weight: 480 kg (1,058 lb)
- Gross weight: 720 kg (1,587 lb)
- Powerplant: 1 × NAG 4-cyl in-line piston engine, 75 kW (101 hp)

Performance

- Wing loading: 14 kg/m^{2} (2.9 lb/sq ft)
- Power/mass: 0.1 kW/kg
