= Konstantin Vakulovsky =

Russian flying ace (1894–1918)

Konstantin Konstantinovich Vakulovsky
- Born: 28 October 1894; Dagestan, Russian Turkestan
- Died: Summer 1918
- Military career
- Allegiance: Russian Empire
- Branch: Imperial Russian Air Service
- Rank: Captain
- Unit: 33rd Corps Detachment
- Commands: 1st Corps Fighter Detachment
- Awards: Order of Saint George, Fourth Class; Gold Sword for Bravery; Order of Saint Vladimir, Fourth Class; Order of Saint Stanilas, Fourth, Third, and Second Class; Order of Saint Anne, Fourth, Third, and Second Classes; French Croix de Guerre

Captain Konstantin Konstantinovich Vakulovsky (born 28 October 1894, died summer 1918) was a World War I flying ace credited with six aerial victories. A major general's son, he volunteered for aviation duty on 8 August 1914, six days after graduating from university. He taught himself to fly, and became one of Russia's first military pilots on 13 June 1915. After escaping the fall of the Novogeorgievsk Fortress in a hazardous flight, Vakylovsky flew reconnaissance missions, some through heavy ground fire. Given command of the newly formed First Fighter Detachment, he became a flying ace credited with six aerial victories. He died in a flying accident during summer 1918.

== Biography ==
Konstantin Konstantinovich Vakulovsky was a major general's son, born on 28 October 1894 in Dagestan. When young, he served in the Vladikavkaz Cadet Corps. However, he was schooled in Saint Petersburg at the Military Engineering-Technical University, graduating on 2 August 1914. Beginning 8 August 1914, he served as an aerial observer with the air detachment at the Novogeorgievsk Fortress. While doing so, he enrolled in basic aviation courses and taught himself to fly. After flying 50 training flights without an instructor, he passed his graduation flight with distinction. On 13 June 1915, he was appointed a military pilot by the Supreme Commander in Chief of the Imperial Russian Army.

On 20 August 1915, the Novogeorgievsk Fortress fell to the invading Germans. Vakulovsky departed the siege in a hazardous low level flight through ground fire and foul foggy weather. After five hours flying, he reached friendly forces with news of the fortress' fall, and with the battle standards of the fort. The feat earned the gallant pilot the Order of Saint George Fourth Class.

Vakulovsky and the other surviving pilots from the fallen fort were formed into the 33rd Corps Detachment of the Imperial Russian Air Service on 29 October 1915. They flew reconnaissance missions throughout the winter of 1915/1916. On 18 February 1916, Vakulovsky flew an aerial photography mission over Bushof through heavy anti-aircraft fire. On 10 April 1916, by order of the czar, he was granted the Gold Sword for Bravery; the citation took special notice of the Bushof sortie.

On 16 July 1916, Vakulovsky was promoted to Poruchik. Within the week, he was given command of the nascent First Fighter Detachment, on the recommendation of Grand Duke Alexander.

Vakulovsky scored his first aerial victory on 7 September 1916. On the 19th, he was so severely stunned by the blast of an antiaircraft shell over Postav that he was sidelined for some weeks. He returned to duty 25 October 1916, and scored his second victory three days afterward. He came under fire immediately after that, his craft suffering a shattered propeller and splintered frame. On 28 October, he flew four sorties; on the last one, he scored a victory, but crashlanded afterwards at his own airfield.

Vakulovsky recorded no more victories for some months, but continued to fly combat. He was promoted to Stabskapitän on 12 April 1917; two days later, he scored his third victory. On 12 May 1917, he participated on a raid on an enemy aerodrome at Kabilnichachby and claimed a victory that went unconfirmed. His reconnaissance patrols also had its hazards; on 13 June 1917, for instance, he flew an aerial photography mission over the enemy's third line trenches over Baldohn at 500 meters. Antiaircraft fire set his plane afire, and he glided to a flaming landing on Dalen Island under artillery fire. Although scorched, wounded, and shocked, he escaped the wreckage.

Vakulovsky scored his next victory on 21 August 1917. He would have another pair of victories accredited to him on 1 September 1917. On that day, he fought on 16 separate occasions. The following month, a few Sopwith Triplanes were delivered to the First Air Division, and he requested one of them for his personal craft.

Konstantin Konstantinovich Vakulovsky died in a flying accident in the summer of 1918.

== List of aerial victories ==
See also Aerial victory standards of World War I, List of World War I flying aces from the Russian Empire

Confirmed victories are numbered and listed chronologically.

No.	Date/time	Aircraft	Foe	Result	Location	Notes
1	7 September 1916	Nieuport 11 serial number 1295	Enemy aircraft	Fell in a steep banking curve	Lake Krakshta	Vakulovsky crashlanded at own airfield after combat
2	28 October 1916	Nieuport 11 s/n 1295	Albatros	Albatros dove toward own lines after being attacked thrice	Lake Vishnevsky	
3	14 April 1917	Morane-Saulnier s/n 741	Enemy two-seater	Crashed and burned	Northeast of Budslav	Enemy air crew killed in action
u/c	12 May 1917		Enemy aircraft		Kabilnichachby Airfield	
4	21 August 1917	Nieuport 17 s/n 1450	Schneider-type enemy fighter	Splashed into Gulf of Riga	Near Tukums, Latvia	
u/c	21 August 1917	Nieuport 17 s/n 1450	Enemy aircraft		Vicinity of Kavgern and Assern	
5	1 September 1917	Nieuport 23 s/n 3747	Enemy aircraft		Vicinity of Ikskul	
6	1 September 1917	Nieuport 23 s/n 3747	Enemy aircraft	Fell behind German lines	Vicinity of Iskul	

== Honors and awards ==
- Order of Saint Stanilas Fourth Class with Crossed Swords and Bow
- Order of Saint Anna Fourth Class for Bravery
- Order of Saint Anna Third Class with Crossed Swords and Bow
- Order of Saint Anna Second Class with Crossed Swords
- Order of Saint Stanilas Third Class with Crossed Swords and Bow
- Order of Saint Stanilas Second Class with Crossed Swords and Bow
- Order of Saint Vladimir Fourth Class with Crossed Swords and Bow
- Order of Saint George Fourth Class
- Gold Sword for Bravery
