= Nikolay Kokorin =

WW1 Russian fighter ace

Nikolay Kirillovich Kokorin
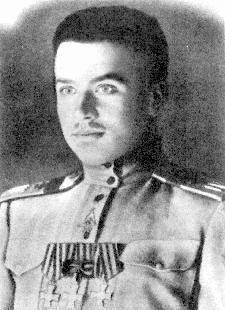
- Born: 21 May 1889; Khlebnikovo, Russian Empire
- Died: 29 May 1917 (aged 28); Pidhaitsi
- Military career
- Allegiance: Russian Empire
- Branch: Engineers; Imperial Russian Air Service
- Service years: 1910–1917
- Rank: Podporuchik
- Unit: 4th Corps Fighter Detachment
- Awards: Cross of Saint George, Gold Sword for Bravery, Order of Saint George, Order of Saint Anna, Order of Saint Stanilas

Nikolay Kirillovich Kokorin (Russian: Никола́й Кири́ллович Коко́рин; 21 May 1889 – 16 May 1917) was one of the most successful Russian flying aces and fighter pilots during World War I, credited with five aerial victories.

== Biography ==
=== Early life ===
Nikolai Kirillovich Kokorin was born into a working-class family in Khlebnikovo (near Moscow) on 21 May 1889. He received primary education in a small Russian Orthodox school before beginning work as a laborer. Though he was energetic and hardworking, he felt his limited education offered him no chance for advancing himself in life working in a factory.

Kokorin joined the Russian military on 23 December 1910, serving first with the Vislyanskaya Mine battalion. He applied for a transfer to the newly formed Siberian Aeronautics Battalion for pilot's training in June 1912 and was assigned to its motor pool. He did not begin pilot's training until 21 January 1914. On 20 September 1914, Kokorin qualified as a pilot on a Nieuport and was promoted to Starshyi Unter-Officer (a senior noncommissioned rank).

=== Involvement in World War I ===
Kokorin was forwarded to the 4th Corps Fighter Detachment in December 1914. After gaining flying experience with them, he was sent to the Moscow Aviation School for advanced training on 19 July 1915. He returned to his unit on 4 September. He also flew daring reconnaissance and bombing missions with such brio that he had earned all four classes of the Cross of Saint George by December 1915. Kokorin was engaged in aerial combat on several occasions while flying reconnaissance and bombing missions but failed to score any victories. He was aggressive enough that in his first combat, on 14 April 1916, it was noted that he and his observer attacked and drove off a German Albatros with pistol fire, though return machine gun fire wounded Kokorin's observer.

On 25 August 1916, Kokorin was raised to Praporshik by order of his commander-in-chief. Also in August 1916, his unit was moved to Luzk, where he flew the SPAD VII and later the Nieuport 11. He served under command of Alexander Kazakov while they flew defensive sorties during the Siege of Ternopol.

Kokorin scored his first win on 25 November 1916. He would not succeed again until 2 January 1917. His third victory did not come until 14 April 1917. Kokorin went on leave on 20 April 1917. He scored his fourth victory the day after he returned to duty. He became an ace the day after that, 26 May. On 29 May 1917, Nikolai Kokorin took on three enemy airplanes at 0600 hours. He took a bullet through his chest from shoulder to shoulder. His remains and his aircraft fell to the east of Pidhaitsi (present day Ukraine).

On 22 July 1917, Kokorin was promoted to Podporuchik.

== List of aerial victories ==
See also Aerial victory standards of World War I, List of World War I flying aces from the Russian Empire

Confirmed victories are numbered and listed chronologically.

No.	Date/time	Aircraft	Foe	Result	Location	Notes
1	25 November 1916	Nieuport 11 serial no. N1102	Enemy aircraft	Forced to land	Between Rozhishche and Kol Mikhailin	
2	2 January 1917	Morane-Saulnier H	Enemy two-seater	Shot down	Vicinity of Luzk (present day Ukraine)	Bullet-riddled air crew dropped out of falling aircraft
3	14 April 1917	Morane-Saulnier H	Albatros C.III	Forced down; plane overturned	Uvse	Shared victory
4	25 May 1917 @ 1210 hours	Nieuport 21 s/n N1810	Hansa-Brandenburg C.I s/n C I 64.62	Dropped into steep dive and fell out of sight	Between Shabalin and Brezany (present day Slovakia)	Aircrew victims from Austro-Hungarian Fliegerkompanie 11 WIA
5	26 May 1917	Nieuport 21 s/n N1810	Hansa-Brandenburg C.1	Shot down. German pilot killed; observer fell to death.	Northwest of Kosovo near Teofipulka	Shared victory; victim from Austro-Hungarian Fliegerkompanie 9

== Honors and awards ==
- Cross of Saint George All four classes: By December 1915
- Gold Sword for Bravery: 31 July 1917 (posthumously)
- Order of Saint George Fourth Class: 31 July 1917 (posthumously)
- Order of Saint Anna Fourth Class for Bravery: 26 January 1917
- Order of Saint Stanilas Third Class with Crossed Swords and Bow: 13 April 1917
