= Victor Fyodorov =

Russian flying ace (1885–1922)

Viktor Georgiyevich Fyodorov
- Born: 11 November 1885; Alma-Ata, Russian Turkestan, Russian Empire
- Died: 4 March 1922 (aged 36); Saint-Cloud, France
- Military career
- Allegiance: Russian Empire
- Branch: French flying service (Aéronautique Militaire); Imperial Russian Air Service
- Service years: 1914 - 1918
- Rank: Lieutenant
- Nickname: "Air Cossack of Verdun"
- Units: France: Escadrille 42, Escadrille 26, Escadrille 89; Romania: Escadrila N3, Russia: 11th Korpusnoi Aviatsionniy Otryad (Corps Aviation Detachment)
- Conflicts: Battle of Verdun
- Awards: Legion d'honneur, Medaille militaire, Croix de Guerre

Lieutenant Viktor Georgiyevich Fyodorov (11 November 1885 - 4 March 1922) was a Russian World War I flying ace credited with five aerial victories while flying with the French military air service. Having left Russia for Belgium in 1908, with a further move to France, Fyodorov was still living in the latter when World War I began. On 21 August 1914, he volunteered for the French Foreign Legion, and served with them until wounded and invalided from infantry service. After preliminary duty as a chauffeur, he became a pilot on 27 November 1915. After acquiring Pierre Lanero as his mechanic, aerial observer, and gunner, Fyodorov scored three aerial victories in March 1916 with Lanero manning the twin engine Caudron G4's guns.

They were shot down and wounded on 1 April 1916. Upon recovery, Fyodorov wangled an assignment to the Kingdom of Romania in October. While they were there, he managed a transfer in the Imperial Russian Air Service for the two of them by the end of 1916. However, Fydorov's stint in Russia during 1917 was unsuccessful; he fell ill without scoring any aerial victories. By the time he recovered, through Lanero's ministrations, the Russian Revolution had taken Russia out of the war. "The Air Cossack of Verdun" and his mechanic returned to France in March 1918. By June, Fyodorov returned to combat, flying for the French. He scored two more victories as the war roared to a close, and was wounded for the third time on 16 October 1918. It was the end of his war.

Fyodorov remained in France postwar, swearing lifelong friendship for Lanero. However, Viktor Georgiyevich Fyodorov died in Saint-Cloud, France on 4 March 1922.

== Biography ==
=== Early life and military service ===
Viktor Georgiyevich Fyodorov was born in Alma-Ata, Russian Turkestan on 11 November 1885. It was a region in straitened circumstances, being dependent on cattle husbandry and farming. Fyodorov left it behind when he departed for the University of Kharkov; he became one of only 12,500 college students in the entirety of Russia. While at university, he became imbued with Social Democratic Party politics. As those views were considered revolutionary at the time, Fyodorov moved to Belgium in 1908. From there, he went on to France, and found life there enjoyable.

When World War I erupted, he was still in France. On 21 August 1914, he volunteered for military service in the 2nd Regiment of the French Foreign Legion. He was assigned to Battalion F, and committed to front line service on 24 October 1914. On 21 November, he was promoted to Caporal.

=== Transfer to aviation service ===
On 23 March 1915, he was wounded in action and hospitalized. His wound was so severe that he was unfit for further infantry duties. He implored the Russian military attaché for help transferring to aviation duty. After his discharge from hospital, he joined French aviation as a chauffeur on 8 May 1915. He was subsequently recommended for, and received, pilot's training at Buc and d'Amberieux. On 27 November 1915, he received Military Pilot's Brevet No. 2004. His first flying assignment, on 21 January 1916, was to Escadrille C42 as a Caudron pilot. His first task was to find a satisfactory mechanic. After several candidates had been found wanting, Fyodorov was sent "...a kid from the Class of '16....Dirty, not groomed, unshaven, swimming in those large blue pants, drenched in oil...." After flying a Caudron tuned by young Caporal Pierre Lanero, Fyodorov landed to proclaim, "Now I am able to be at ease, my back does not hurt and does not vibrate. I can walk wonderfully." Fyodorov had found his mechanic for the rest of his war.

On 21 February 1916, Fyodorov was promoted to sergeant, even as the Battle of Verdun erupted. His flights were in support of the ongoing ground action. He gained the reputation of being cheerfully willing for a fight, and eager to press home an attack in the air. On 14 March, he took Lanero along as an observer/gunner. It was the young mechanic's first combat sortie. Fyodorov dove on four German airplanes crossing into friendly territory. In the ensuing gun battle, Lanero shot down a German plane, and the Caudron suffered 17 bullet holes. Lanero and Fyodorov had scored their first victory.

Lanero would continue as Fyodorov's usual gunner for flights through the balance of March. Several times, they tackled superior numbers of German planes; they shot down enemy planes on both the 21st and 30th, while repelling enemy formations on other occasions. They posted victory claims for six enemy aircraft; three were verified. On 22 March 1916, both of them were nominated for the Médaille militaire for their courageous feats. Four days later, they were mentioned in despatches.

On 1 April 1916, their luck ran out. They were shot down in combat with three German planes, with a wounded Fyodorov barely able to pull off a crashlanding through some wire fences in a mountain meadow. Lanero was also wounded by bullet fragments in his back. Fyodorov was medically evacuated to Melun on 3 April. By then, the Germans had nicknamed the Russian the "Air Cossack of Verdun".

In the midst of this, on 2 April, Fyodorov's award of the Médaille militaire came through. When he discovered Lanero had not been similarly decorated, Fyodorov protested to no avail. He was informed that one medal per squadron per day would suffice.

=== Romanian and Russian service ===
A promotion into the officer's ranks, as a Sous lieutenant, came on 9 August 1916, with a personal thanks for his service rendered by General Joffre. Now well again, Fyodorov was reassigned to Escadrille 26, a relatively inactive Nieuport squadron. This unit would become one of the famous Les Cigognes, and known as a premier squadron, but Fyodorov was not happy there. A strain of homesickness inhabited his correspondence at that time as he applied to join the French Military Mission to Romania. He was accepted, and on 10 October 1916, he and Lanero began their journey to the Romanian front. They would join the Franco-Romanian Escadrila N3 under the command of Capitaine Maurice Gond. They would operate from an airfield near Bucharest until forced to retreat on 8 December 1916 by advancing German and Bulgarian advances. When the six pilots of the understrength squadron relocated to Tecuci, Fyodorov was close enough to Russia to apply for instatement into the Imperial Russian Air Service. Fydorov was accepted at a salary of 600 rubles per month with a travel allowance of 2200 rubles, while Lanero received 300 rubles per month with travel stipend of 500.

In December 1916, they were forwarded to Odessa to train Russian pilots. Fyodorov objected to rear echelon duties, and was returned to combat, posted to the 11th Korpusnoi Aviatsionniy Otryad (Corps Aviation Detachment) commanded by Alexander Kazakov. Lanero became well known for his mechanical skills while maintaining Fyodorov's Nieuport 17 with its squadron insignia of the Star of David. After failing to score any further aerial victories, Fyodorov was reassigned to instructor duty, this time at Sevastopol. He then fell ill and was confined to hospital in Moscow. Lanero found him out, nursed him night and day, scrounged up medicines for his pilot. Fyodorov believed no brother could have taken better care. When Fyodorov became heartsick over the events of the ongoing Russian Revolution, his young mechanic comforted him. By the time Fyodorov was discharged, Russia had quit fighting and was engaged in the Russian Civil War.

=== Return to France ===
Fyodorov and Lanero left Russia in March 1918. When they had returned to Russia, they had been promised a departure travel allowance of 775 rubles for the pilot and 300 for the mechanic; it is unknown if they collected this. However, they arrived back in France on 10 April 1918. After a wait for reassignment, Fyodorov joined Escadrille 89, a SPAD squadron, in June 1918, and became a temporary Lieutenant on 9 August 1918. On 12 August, he was honored with an award of the Legion d'honneur: the citation read: "Magnificent example of patriotism, bravery, and sense of duty. Wounded in the infantry, then transferred to the aviation service, distinguished himself by his bravery and his brilliant combats during which he shot down four enemy planes. After the campaigns of Romania and Russia, returned to the French front being always in combat a model of spirit, courage, and tenacity."

Escadrille 89 was one of the French squadrons whose operational control was assigned to American General John J. Pershing's command, the First Army. It was placed under the direct command of Colonel Billy Mitchell on 7 September 1918. The Saint Mihiel offensive kicked off five days later. On 18 September, while overflying the battle, he was a member of a patrol of five credited with shooting down a German two-seater.

The squadron shifted bases on 29 September 1918 to support the Meuse-Argonne offensive. On 9 October 1918, while on a bomber escort sortie, Fyodorov shot down a German fighter for his fifth accredited victory. A week later, he was once again wounded and evacuated to hospital. It was the end of his combat career.

An award citation of 7 November 1918 eloquently outlined his wartime service: "Victor Federov, Sous-Lieutenant in the Foreign Regiment, pilot in the squadron Spa.89, courageous officer. Although in action for a period of four years, was never discouraged by fatigue and injuries. On October 16, 1918, attacked by three Fokkers and wounded during the combat, successfully brought back his bullet-riddled plane to our lines."

Viktor Georgiyevich Fyodorov lived on Veronese Street in Paris after his recovery. He swore lifelong friendship for Lanero. However, Fyodorov died at Saint-Cloud, France on 4 March 1922.

== List of aerial victories ==
See also Aerial victory standards of World War I for French victory standards, as well as List of World War I flying aces from the Russian Empire.

Confirmed victories are numbered and listed chronologically.

No.	Date/time	Aircraft	Foe	Result	Location	Notes
1	14 March 1916	Caudron	Enemy aircraft		Cernay, France	Victory shared with aerial observer Pierre Lanero
2	21 March 1916	Caudron	Enemy two-seater		West of Douaumont, France	Victory shared with Lanero
3	30 March 1916	Caudron	Enemy aircraft		Moranville, France	Victory shared with Lanero
4	18 September 1918	SPAD	Enemy two-seater		Belrupt, France	Victory shared with four other pilots
5	9 October 1918	SPAD	Enemy fighter		Damvillers, France	
