= Yevgraf Kruten =

World War I flying ace

Yevgraf Nikolaevich Kruten
- Евграф Николаевич Крутень
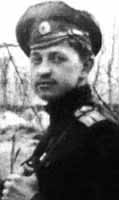
- Born: 29 December 1890; Kiev, Russian Empire
- Died: 19 June 1917 (aged 26); Plotychy, Russia
- Burial place: Luk'yanovskoe Cemetery, Kiev
- Military career
- Allegiance: Russian Empire
- Branch: Imperial Russian Air Service
- Service years: 1908–1917
- Rank: Podpolkovnik
- Units: 24th Corps Aviation Detachment; 21st Corps Aviation Detachment; 2nd Army Air Detachment, French Aéronautique Militaire: Escadrille 3
- Commands: 2nd Fighter Aviation Detachment, 2nd Battle Aviation Group
- Awards: Order of Saint George, Order of Saint Stanislas, Order of Saint Anne, Order of Saint Vladimir, Gold Sword for Bravery, French Croix de Guerre

Podpolkovnik Yevgraf Nikolaevich Kruten was a World War I flying ace credited with seven aerial victories. He began World War I as an aerial observer with three years experience in military aviation. After a year's seasoning, he was recommended for, and graduated from, pilot's training in September 1914. He rose through the ranks, to be appointed as his unit's commander on 6 June 1916. With his victory tally at three, he was forwarded to service with the French Aéronautique Militaire. While learning French aerial tactics, Kruten shot down a German aircraft during February 1917. After his return to Russia in March 1917, he shared his new-found knowledge in a flurry of booklets on military aviation. He commanded his battle group of three detachments, and ran his victory total to seven before dying in a landing accident on 19 June 1917.

== Early life and service ==
Yevgraf Kruten was born into a family with a military tradition; both his father and his mother's father were colonels. He entered the world on 29 December 1890 in Kiev. In 1901, aged 11, he attended the Kiev Military Cadet Corps School. He was forwarded to horse artillery in 1908 as an ensign. In 1911, he was commissioned with the rank of podporuchik upon graduation from Konstantin Artillery School. In April 1912, he was transferred to Kiev. He was selected in June 1913 for a study of the potential use of heavier-than-air by the Imperial Russian Army. The test of five airplanes was conducted by the leader of the pilot contingent at Brovary, Pyotr Nesterov. Kruten was required to fly as part of Russia's maiden attempt at artillery spotting. The several flights he took sparked his interest. He found his way to the Third Air Company, which was located at Sviatoshyn Airfield in Kiev near his duty station. By August 1913, he was flying as an aerial observer in military maneuvers. He made six flights in foggy rainy weather with Nesterov, including one at night. As a result of his friendship with Nesterov, the aviator wrote a letter recommending Kruten's admission to aviation training.

Kruten was one of the spectators when Nesterov flew the first aerial loop in history on 9 September 1913. In January 1914, Kruten began aviation training at the Katchinsky military school near Sevastopol. His natural talent can be seen in his flying his own loops on 23 August 1914. Kruten graduated as a military pilot in September 1914.

== Flying service in World War I ==
At the outbreak of war, Kruten began flying reconnaissance and bombing missions as a member of the 21st Corps Air Detachment. He reached the front and began flying combat in October 1914. He flew reconnaissance and bombing missions; by February 1915, he had flown over 40 sorties without crossing paths with any enemy aircraft. He switched to the 2nd Army Air Detachment; when he scored his first aerial victory on 6 March 1915, piloting a Voisin he was awarded the Order of Saint Anne Fourth Class. His observer/gunner, Captain Ducimetier of the General Staff, both shot down the plane and confirmed the victory. The successful duo flew back through crippling antiaircraft fire that stopped their engine and forced their landing near the Russian 2nd Caucasian Corps.

The following month, April 1915, saw Kruten fly more than 25 long range missions. On the 18th, he partook in his unit's first night bombing sortie. Kruten continued to serve in the unit as it was redesignated as the 2nd Fighter Aviation Detachment. On 5 June, Captain Ducimeter was again his observer when they suffered a runaway propeller on their aircraft. Kruten got them home safely; the staff captain's report on the incident recommended Kruten's promotion to Captain. A month later, he received his captaincy, as well as the Order of St. Vladimir Fourth Class with Swords and Ribbon.

In early 1916, Kruten's unit re-equipped with Nieuport 11s. During his orientation on the new machine, he realized that other pilots were unready for aerial battle. For them, Kruten wrote the first of several little pamphlets on the subject. It defined the assault sequence as: Altitude—Speed—Maneuver—Fire.

In April 1916, Kruten was ordered to Smolensk to test fly aircraft for the new fighter groups being formed. He was brought back to Smolensk a second time, on 20 May 1916. He was given command of the brand new 2nd Boevaya Aviatsionnaya Gruppa (Battle Aviation Group) on 6 June. When the group was formed from the detachments from the 3rd, 7th, and 8th Corps, it was still short pilots. It would not be completed and committed to action until late July 1916; it reached its base at Nesvizh on 7 August.

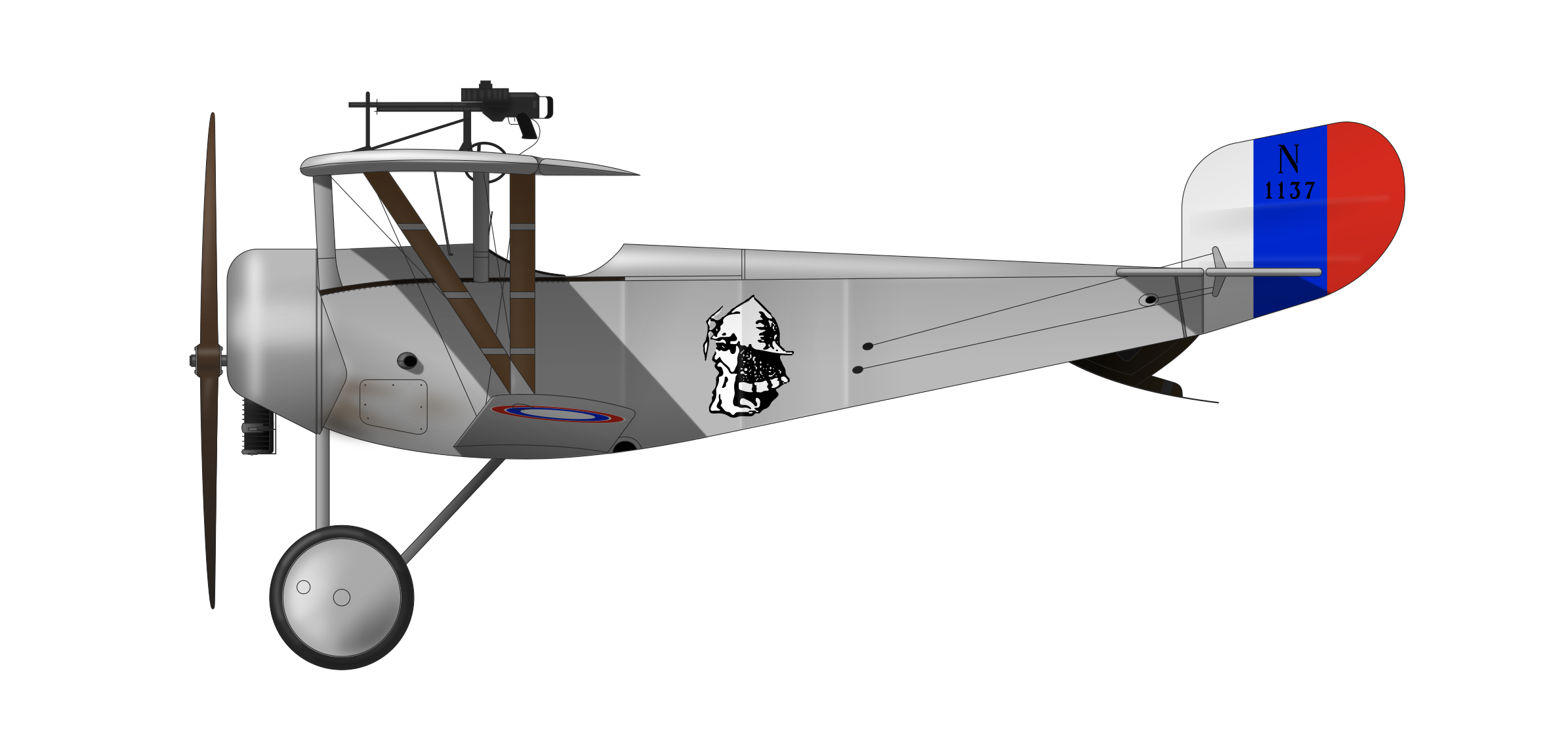
Yevgraf Kruten's Nieuport 11, July–August 1916.

Kruten led from the front, scoring two more victories in August 1916. On 13 November, he was selected as one of a party assigned to the Western Front for cross-training with French aviators. He was posted to Pau in January 1917; later, he transferred to the flying school at Cazau. In February, he was serving with Felix Brocard's Escadrille 3; he was credited with a victory while with them. He returned to Russia in March 1917, after hearing of Czar Nicholas's abdication. The French had awarded him a Croix de Guerre for his victory.

The assignment to the French left him of the opinion that, "There is nothing about flying that we could learn from foreigners...." When he arrived back in Russia on 24 March 1917, he began writing a pamphlet, Invasion of Foreigners, protesting French aid to the Russians. This was the second of his pamphlets on Russian use of air power; he wrote at least eight booklets on the subject. In the meantime, he reassumed command of the 2nd BAG in early April 1917. The group was equipped with a mix of Nieuport 17 and Nieuport 21 fighters. One of each was reserved for Kruten's use. Both Nieuport 17 serial number 2232 and Nieuport 21 number 4572 were marked with Kruten's insignia of a medieval knight.

From mid-April 1917, his Battle Group was stationed in Plotych, ten kilometers north of Tarnopol. Kruten threw himself into combat, leading from the front. On 30 May 1917, for instance, he fought six times without result. Interspersed with his dogfights were photo-reconnaissance and artillery adjustment missions. He would score three more victories during May and June 1917. His final victory, on 6 June 1917, was unusual; he ran out of fuel during his attack, but still managed to down his foe while gliding to a forced landing.

On 19 June 1917 at 0925 hours, while returning from a combat mission, as his landing Nieuport sank through 100 meters altitude, Yevgraf Kruten spun in and crashed. Once removed from the wreckage, he lingered only a short while after the crash. He was posthumously promoted to Podpolkovnik. He was buried at the Nicholsky Military Cathedral in Kiev. In 1930, he was reinterred in Luk'yanovskoe Cemetery, still in his native Kiev.

== List of aerial victories ==
See also Aerial victory standards of World War I, List of World War I flying aces from the Russian Empire

Confirmed victories are numbered and listed chronologically.

No.	Date/time	Aircraft	Foe	Result	Location	Notes
1	6 March 1915	Voisin LA serial number 42	Enemy aircraft	Descended at steep angle	Ravka	
2	11 August 1916	Nieuport 11 s/n N1137	Albatros C.III s/n 422	Captured	Svoyatichi	Victim was from Austro-Hungarian Fliegerkompanie 31
3	14 August 1916	Nieuport 11 s/n N1137/1582	Rumpler two-seater s/n 615	Captured after deadstick landing	Nesvizh	Victim was from Austro-Hungarian Fliegerkompanie 31
4	February 1917	Spad VII	Enemy aircraft		France	
5	31 May 1917 @ 0750 hours	Nieuport 17 s/n N2232	Hansa-Brandenburg C.I s/n 69.78	Crashed in flames; air crew killed in action	Northeast of Berezhany	Victim was from Austro-Hungarian Fliegerkompanie 18
6	5 June 1917 @ 0630 hours	Nieuport 17 s/n N2232	Enemy two-seater	Escaped via a steep dive	Tarnopol	Observer KIA
7	6 June 1917	Nieuport 17 s/n N2232	Hansa-Brandenburg C.I s/n 64.55	Shot down; air crew captured	Marianka	Victim from Austro-Hungarian Fliegerkompanie 18

== Honors and awards ==
- Order of Saint Anna Fourth Class: 6 April 1915
- Order of Saint Vladimir Fourth Class with Swords and Bow
- Order of Saint Stanislas Third Class
- Order of Saint George Fourth Class
- Order of Saint Stanilas Second Class with Crossed Swords
- Gold Sword for Bravery
- Order of Saint George Third Class (posthumous)
- French Croix de Guerre
