= Viktor Utgof =

Russian aviator

Viktor Viktorovich Utgoff
- Виктор Викторович Утгоф
- Born: July 14, 1889; Novoradansk, Radom Governorate, Russian Empire
- Died: October 11, 1930 (aged 41); Massachusetts, United States
- Military career
- Allegiance: Russian Empire
- Branch: Imperial Russian Navy
- Service years: 1906–1917
- Rank: Senior Lieutenant
- Unit: Black Sea Fleet
- Conflicts: World War I
- Awards: Order of St. George

Viktor Viktorovich Utgoff (also sometimes spelled Uthof, Russian: Виктор Викторович Утгоф; 14 July 1889 — 11 October 1930) was a Russian naval aviator who became a seaplane ace during World War I with five aerial victories, while serving in the Black Sea Fleet of the Imperial Russian Navy.

== Biography ==
Utgoff was born in a village in the Radom Governorate in 1889, being part of a family of hereditary Russian nobility. His father had also been a military officer. He entered service in 1906, then graduated from the Sea Cadet Corps in 1910 before finishing the officer aviation school of the Air Fleet in 1912. He became deputy commander of the Black Sea Fleet aviation and stressed the need to develop ships that were capable of carrying aircraft, seaplanes in particular. During the war he mainly flew reconnaissance missions and reported on Ottoman Navy movements before shooting down five enemy aircraft in aerial combat, becoming the first Russian naval aviator to earn the Order of St. George. He later emigrated to the United States after the Russian Revolution, having been assigned as assistant military attaché to the Russian embassy in Washington in 1917. Utgoff later died in an aviation accident in 1930. He had three sons. All three sons enlisted in various military positions. His son Vadim went on to serve as an officer and pilot in the United States Navy in World War II, fighting in the Pacific Theater.

== Sources ==
=== Books ===
- Oliver, David (2005). Airborne Espionage: International Special Duty Operations in the Second World War. The History Press Press. ISBN 9780752495521.
