= Mikhail Safonov (pilot) =

Russian pilot

Mikhail Ivanovich Safonov, alias Mikko Vuorenheimo
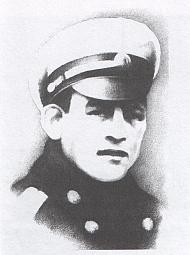
- Born: 13 November 1893; Ostrogozhsk, Russian Empire
- Died: May 1924 (aged 30); Ming River, China
- Military career
- Allegiance: Russian Empire
- Branch: Aviation
- Service years: 20 September 1893 – March 1918
- Rank: Lieutenant
- Units: Russian cruiser Gromoboi, Battleship Sevastopol, First Air Detachment (Glagol) of the 2nd Air Division, 2nd Land Fighter Detachment
- Awards: Bronze Medal marking 300 years rule by the House of Romanov, Bronze Medal commemorating the hundredth anniversary of the Fatherland War, Order of Saint Anne Fourth Class with inscription "For Bravery", Order of Saint Stanilas Third Class with Swords and Bow, Order of Saint Vladimir Fourth Class with Swords and Ribbon, Order of Saint Vladimir Third Class with Swords and Ribbon
- Other work: Flew in Finnish Civil War and in RAF.

Lieutenant Mikhail Ivanovich Safonov (13 November 1893 – May 1924) was a World War I flying ace credited with five aerial victories. He began his naval service on 20 September 1909, when he entered Saint Peterburg's Imperial Russian Naval Academy. When Safonov applied for aviation training in September 1915, he was a professional sailor with six years naval training and seagoing service.

On 1 December 1915, he soloed. On 2 April 1916, he was classified as a naval pilot. He was posted to pilot Grigorovich M-9 flying boats that mounted a Madsen machine gun. After two aerial victories while piloting flying boats, with consequent decorations for valor, Safonov was appointed to command his Glagol Detachment on 14 July 1917. He gained access to a Nieuport fighter, which he used for his third victory on 7 September 1917. After a promotion to Senior Lieutenant on 25 October, he married while on a brief leave. He returned to command the 2nd Fighter Detachment and score two more aerial victories with the Nieuport. He was mustered out in March 1918.

Safonov then became an itinerant aerial mercenary in the Finnish Civil War. In 1919, he changed loyalties to join the White Russians. After travelling with his wife through Persia and India, he joined Britain's Royal Air Force. In May 1924, he was killed in a flying accident in China.

== Biography ==
=== Early life and service ===
Mikhail Ivanovich Safonov was born into nobility on 13 November 1893 in Ostrogozhsk, the Russian Empire. He was a Russian Orthodox adherent. As a child, he was educated in the Ostrogozhsk Gymnasium. He entered Saint Peterburg's Imperial Russian Naval Academy on 20 September 1909. He would serve on half a dozen ships while training. On 21 February 1913, he received a Bronze Medal marking 300 years rule by the House of Romanov; in April 1913, he received another Bronze Medal commemorating the hundredth anniversary of the Fatherland War.

=== World War I service ===
He graduated as a Warrant Officer in May 1914, and was posted to the battleship Gromoboi on 2 August 1914. On 30 September 1914, he was transferred to another battleship, the Sevastopol. In September 1915, he applied for a transfer to aviation service.

On 24 November 1915, he was assigned to the Officer's School of Naval Aviation for the Baltic Fleet and forwarded to the Polytechnic Institute of Peter the Great in Saint Petersburg to study aerodynamics. After mastering this, he moved to the winter location of the school in Baku to pass all the examinations to qualify as a pilot. On 1 December 1915, he soloed.

On 24 February 1916, Safonov was posted to the Liaison/Signal Service Corps of the Baltic Fleet. During March, he polished his piloting skills at the Tallinn Naval Air Station. He was then tasked to fly Farman MF.11 float plane serial no. 31 for the local Third Air Station. On 2 April 1916, he was classified as a naval pilot at the annual salary of 960 rubles. The Air Arm of the Baltic Fleet was organised into two Air Divisions. Safonov was assigned to the First Air Detachment (Glagol) of the 2nd Air Division on 11 August 1916. The Grigorovich M-9 flying boats equipping this detachment mounted a Madsen machine gun.

After several air combats, including his first aerial victory on 9 September 1916, he was awarded the Order of Saint Anne Fourth Class and the Order of Saint Vladimir Third Class with Swords and Bow. He was wounded in action on 13 September 1916 while flying Grigorovich M-9 serial no. 39.

Safonov was appointed as a lieutenant on 10 July 1917. He was selected to command the Glagol Detachment on 14 July 1917. He scored his second aerial victory that day, this time using a Grigorovich M-15, even though the enemy plane was not seen to crash. At 1140 hours on 7 September, Safonov used Nieuport serial no. NR-1 in an attack on an enemy two-seater. He closed to 50 meters range, and fired a short burst for his third victory. On 25 October, Safonov was promoted to Senior Lieutenant and granted a short leave. He married Ludmila Tschebotarioff. Upon his return to duty, he was posted to command the 2nd Land Fighter Detachment at Kuivastoin.

He scored two more aerial victories on successive days, 16 and 17 November 1917. However, the Russian Revolution ended his war then; Safonov was inactive until discharged from the military by the Bolsheviks in March 1918. As Russia was wracked by revolution, Finland declared its independence on 6 December 1917. Safonov was one of five Russian pilots approached by a cabal of Finnish activists; they offered 25,000 rubles and Finnish citizenship if the pilots would serve in General Mannerheim's air force.

On 11 April 1918, the newly civilianised Safonov tucked his wife into a Nieuport 10 and took off to join the Finns. While flying reconnaissance flights in the Finnish Civil War, he used the nom de guerre Mikko Vuorenheimo. However, by summer 1918, the distrustful Finns had not kept their bargain, so Safonov wangled the permits needed to transit German-occupied Russia and join the White Russians' Volunteer Army.

=== Post-World War I ===
By 1919, Safonov was serving in the Volunteer Army of the White Russians' under General Anton Denikin. After their defeat, continuing his career as an itinerant pilot, Safonov and wife moved on to Persia and India; Safonov joined the Royal Air Force in the latter. After that, he ended up in China in 1924, organising aviation training for the Chinese Navy. In May 1924, while testing a flying boat over the Ming River, he was killed in a flying accident. Some years later, his widow and two orphans resettled in the United States.

== List of aerial victories ==
See also Aerial victory standards of World War I, List of World War I flying aces from the Russian Empire

Confirmed victories are numbered and listed chronologically.

No.	Date/time	Aircraft	Foe	Result	Location	Notes
1	9 September 1916	Grigorovich M-9	Enemy seaplane	Forced landing	Irben River, off Gulf of Riga	
2	14 July 1917	Grigorovich M-15	German two-seater	Lost altitude	Gulf of Riga	
3	7 September 1917 @ 1140 hours	Nieuport serial no. NR-1	German two-seater	Shot down	Arenburg	
4	16 November 1917 @ 0915 hours	Nieuport NR-1	Enemy aircraft	Shot down	Moon Island	Crashed onto Moon Island
5	17 November 1917 @ 0900 hours	Nieuport NR-1	German two-engine bomber		Moon Island	

== Honors and awards ==
- Bronze Medal marking 300 years rule by the House of Romanov: 21 February 1913
- Bronze Medal commemorating the hundredth anniversary of the Fatherland War: April 1913
- Order of Saint Anne Fourth Class with inscription "For Bravery": 19 September 1916
- Order of Saint Stanilas Third Class with Swords and Bow: 19 October 1916
- Order of Saint Vladimir Fourth Class with Swords and Ribbon: 14 November 1916, by order no. 380 by Commander in Chief of the Naval Staff
- Order of Saint Vladimir Third Class with Swords and Ribbon: 5 February 1917
