= Zinaida Kokorina =

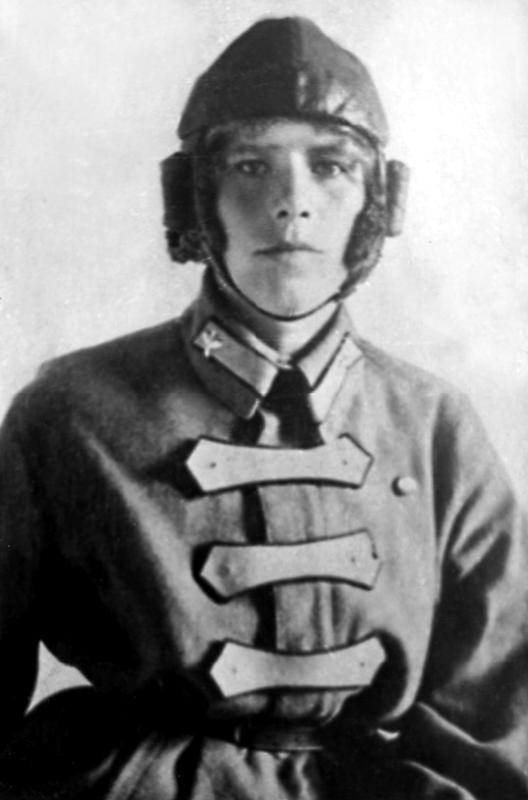

Zinaida Petrovna Kokorina (Russian: Зинаида Петровна Кокорина; 1898 – 1980) was a Russian schoolteacher and aviator. In 1925, she became the world's first female military pilot when she graduated from the Military Aviation School in Yegoryevsk near Moscow. Although she wanted to become a fighter pilot, given her excellent examination results, she was encouraged stay on at the school as an instructor, training some of Russia's most successful female World War II pilots, including Nina Raspopova. She later spent 30 years as headmistress of a village school at Cholpon-Ata in Kyrgyzstan. On her retirement, she returned to Moscow.

== Biography ==
Born at the turn of the 20th century, Zinaïda Kokorina was the daughter of a gold prospector in the Ural Mountains. Brought up in Perm, she lived in a poor home but as a bright child, she was admitted to secondary school. In 1916, she moved to Petrograd to attend university, graduating as a teacher in 1921.

Shortly afterwards, while in Kiev she experienced a plane flying over her for the first time. She was so impressed, she immediately decided she wanted to fly herself. She took up a job as librarian at the flying school in Kacha, Crimea. There she was trained by the Estonian Albert Poel, with whom she fell in love. They had planned to marry but Poel died when his plane crashed a couple of days before the wedding they had planned.

After the disaster, those at the school agreed she could train as a military pilot at Yegoryevsk near Moscow. She was about to be dismissed by a commander but she successfully sought support from Mikhail Kalinin, the Soviet head of state. She first flew solo on 3 May 1924 and soon afterwards received her military licence. Although she was keen to become a fighter pilot, in view of her exceptional skills she was persuaded to stay at the school and become an instructor. During World War II, she trained many pilots, several of them women.

She later spent 30 years as a schoolteacher and headmistress at Cholpon-Ata in Kyrgyzstan. On retirement, she returned to Moscow.
