= Mikhail Abramovich =

Russian poet and translator

Mikhail Solomonovich Abramovich
- Born: 1859; Berditchev, Kiev Governorate, Russian Empire
- Died: 1940 (aged 80–81); Brussels, Belgium
- Children: Vsevolod Abramovich
- Parent: Mendele Mocher Sforim
- Writing career
- Pen name: M. A., Fantazer
- Language: Russian

Mikhail Solomonovich Abramovich (Russian: Михаил Соломонович Абрамович, Yiddish: מאיר אבראמאוויטש; 1859–1940) was a Russian poet and translator. He was the son of Mendele Mocher Sforim.

== Biography ==
Mikhail Abramovich was born in Berditchev to Pesya (née Levin) and S. Y. Abramovich (Mendele Mocher Sforim). He was educated at the Zhitomir gymnasium, though he did not graduate.

In the fall of 1878 he went to St. Petersburg to enrol in the Military Medical Academy. Being implicated in a revolutionary movement, however, he was banished to the Archangel Governorate, then to Samara and Kazan. On his return, he graduated from the Faculty of Law of the University of Saint Petersburg in 1887, and from 1901 practised law.

His earliest poems appeared in Voskhod, Nedyelya, and other periodicals, on general and Jewish subjects. A collection of his poetry was published in book form in 1889. Soon after, Abramovich informally married the playwright Manefa de Fréville, daughter of the provincial secretary of the State Loan Bank in Riga. Years later, however, when their son Vsevolod was refused admission to school on the basis of the law on illegitimate children, Abramovich decided to be baptized so that they could legally marry. According to some sources, he returned to Judaism after their divorce.

Abramovich left Russia after the October Revolution. He died in Brussels in 1940.

== Reception ==
Abramovich's poetry does not appear to have won critical acclaim. In the Jewish Encyclopedia, Herman Rosenthal comments that "excepting those devoted to Judaism or that treat of Biblical subjects his poems do not exhibit much originality." Literary critic Sophia Dubnow-Erlich writes, "He was clearly imitating Frug, but the monotonous rhyming reflections lacked the lightness and melody that characterized the best of Frug's poems."

== Publications ==
- Stikhotvoreniya [Poems]. Saint Petersburg: A. E. Landau. 1889.
