= Vsevolod Abramovich =

Russian inventor

Vsevolod Mikhaylovich Abramovich
- Всеволод Михайлович Абрамович
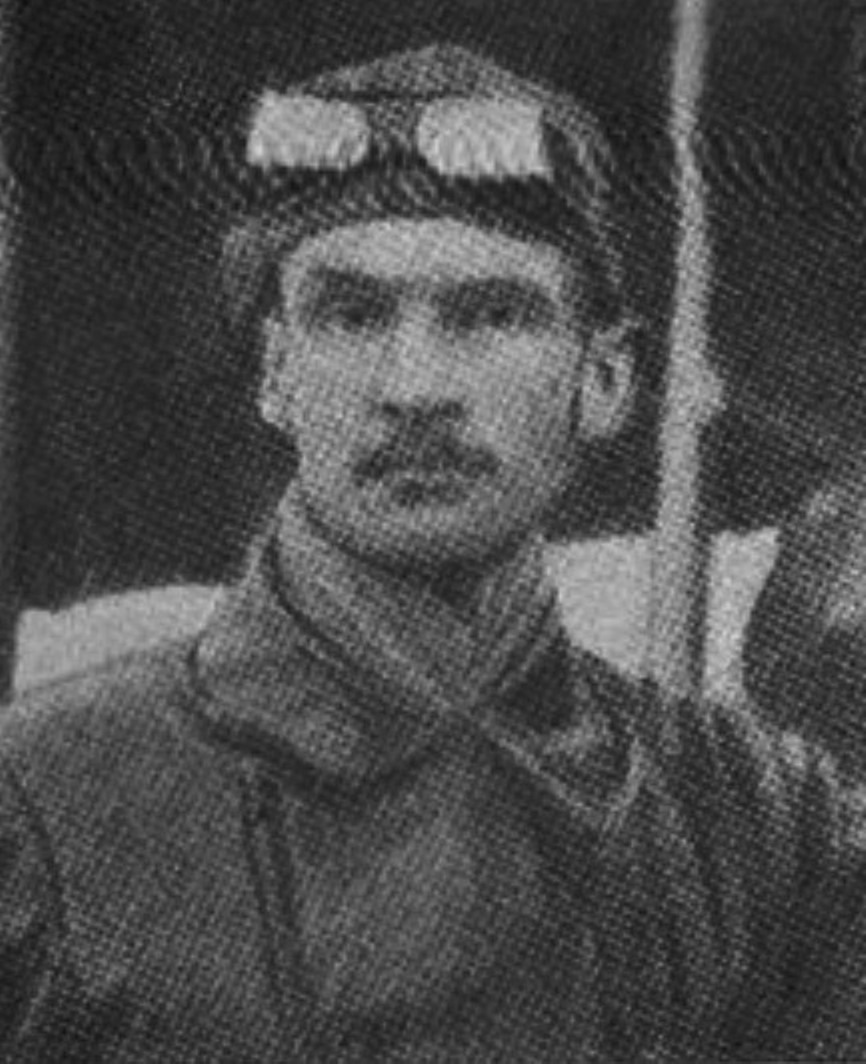
- Born: August 11, 1890; Odessa, Russian Empire
- Died: April 24, 1913 (aged 22); Johannisthal Air Field, German Empire
- Occupations: Aviator, inventor

Vsevolod Mikhaylovich Abramovich (Russian: Всеволод Михайлович Абрамович; August 11, 1890 – April 24, 1913) was a pioneering aviator.

== Biography ==
Abramovich was born on August 11, 1890, in Odessa, son of poet Mikhail Abramovich and grandson of the Yiddish writer Mendele Mocher Sforim. He studied at the Technische Hochschule in Charlottenburg (now Technische Universität Berlin). In 1911, he earned a pilot's licence. He began working for the Wright brothers' German subsidiary, Flugmaschinen Wright in Johannisthal, and became their chief test pilot.

In 1912, Abramovich built his own aircraft, the Abramovich Flyer, based on what he had learned at the Wright factory. He flew it to Saint Petersburg, Russia, to participate in a military aircraft competition.

The same year, he set a world altitude record of 2,100 meters (6,888 feet) and an endurance record for carrying four passengers for 46 minutes and 57 seconds. He was killed in an aviation accident while instructing a student pilot, Evgeniya Shakhovskaya, at Johannisthal on April 24, 1913.
