= Ivan Loiko =

World war I fighter pilot

Ivan Alexandrovich Loiko
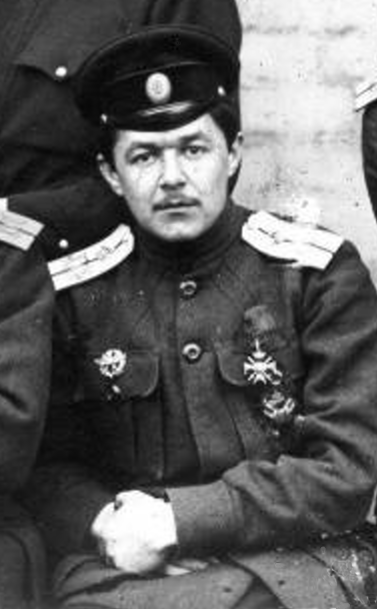
- Born: 6 February 1892; Minsk, Russia
- Died: Probably April 1936
- Military career
- Allegiance: Russia
- Branch: Infantry; aviation
- Service years: 1909 - ca 1918
- Rank: Polkovnik
- Unit: 30th Corps Aviation Detachment
- Commands: 9th Fighter Aviation Detachment
- Awards: Order of Saint George; Order of Saint Vladimir; Order of Saint Stanilas; Order of Saint Anne; Order of the Star of Romania
- Other work: Later served in air forces of the White Russians, Kingdom of Yugoslavia, and the Soviet Union

Polkovnik Ivan Alexandrovich Loiko (Russian: Ива́н Алекса́ндрович Ло́йко; born 6 February 1892, date of death unknown) was a World War I flying ace credited with six confirmed aerial victories by the scanty and confusing records still existent. He rose to command a fighter unit, the 9th Fighter Aviation Detachment. After serving his czar faithfully until the October Revolution, in December 1918 Loiko joined the White Russian movement to reinstate his sovereign. When they were defeated by the Bolsheviks, Loiko turned to service in the Kingdom of Yugoslavia's air force in 1921. Two years later, he defected back to Russia in a Yugoslavian Breguet 19. From 1924-1929, Loiko served in the Red Army Air Force. In 1929, he was convicted of espionage on behalf of Romania and sentenced to ten years imprisonment. He served five years on Vaygach Island, and remained there after his release from captivity. He is believed to have committed suicide in April 1936.

== Biography ==
=== Early life and military service ===
Ivan Loiko was born into a middle-class family in Minsk on 6 February 1892. After his lower level education was complete, he enrolled in the Alexeyevsky Military School in 1909. In 1912, he graduated from there ranked as a Podpraporschik and was posted to the 59th Infantry Reserve Battalion. His military performance was such that he was promoted to Praporshik by mid-1913. On 14 October 1914, he was promoted to Podporuchik; his recommendation noted his valorous leadership. In November, he requested training at the Sevastopol Military Flying School. He began classes there on 10 December 1914. On 20 April 1915, he graduated military pilot training.

=== Aviation service in World War I ===
On 1 May 1915, he was posted to the 30th Corps Air Detachment near Przemysl, flying reconnaissance missions in Voisins and Farmans. He soon earned the respect of his fellow pilots for his performance as pilot and officer. On 30 May 1915, he was granted the right to wear the military pilot's breastplate insignia on his uniform. Over the next 13 months, Loiko flew over 100 sorties in Voisins. He was considered for command of his unit, but instead on 20 July 1916 was given command of a fighter detachment then forming, the 9th Aviatsionniy Otryad Istrebitlei (Fighter Aviation Detachment). Loiko's leadership was of the hardnosed variety seldom seen in Russian units. He assigned the best aircraft in his unit to the most aggressive pilots. On the other hand, pilots who fouled up in some way would find themselves relegated to older machines.

When the Kingdom of Romania declared war on the Central Powers on 27 August 1916, it triggered the tactical reassignment of the 9th AOI, effective 2 September 1916. They did not reach their base at Okna until early October. Loiko did not fly his initial fighter mission until 26 October 1916. While trailing two wingmen, Loiko closed to pointblank machine gun fire on an enemy aircraft. The stricken foe rolled onto its side and plummeted to earth near Russian troops. Loiko scored once more that year, on 27 December.

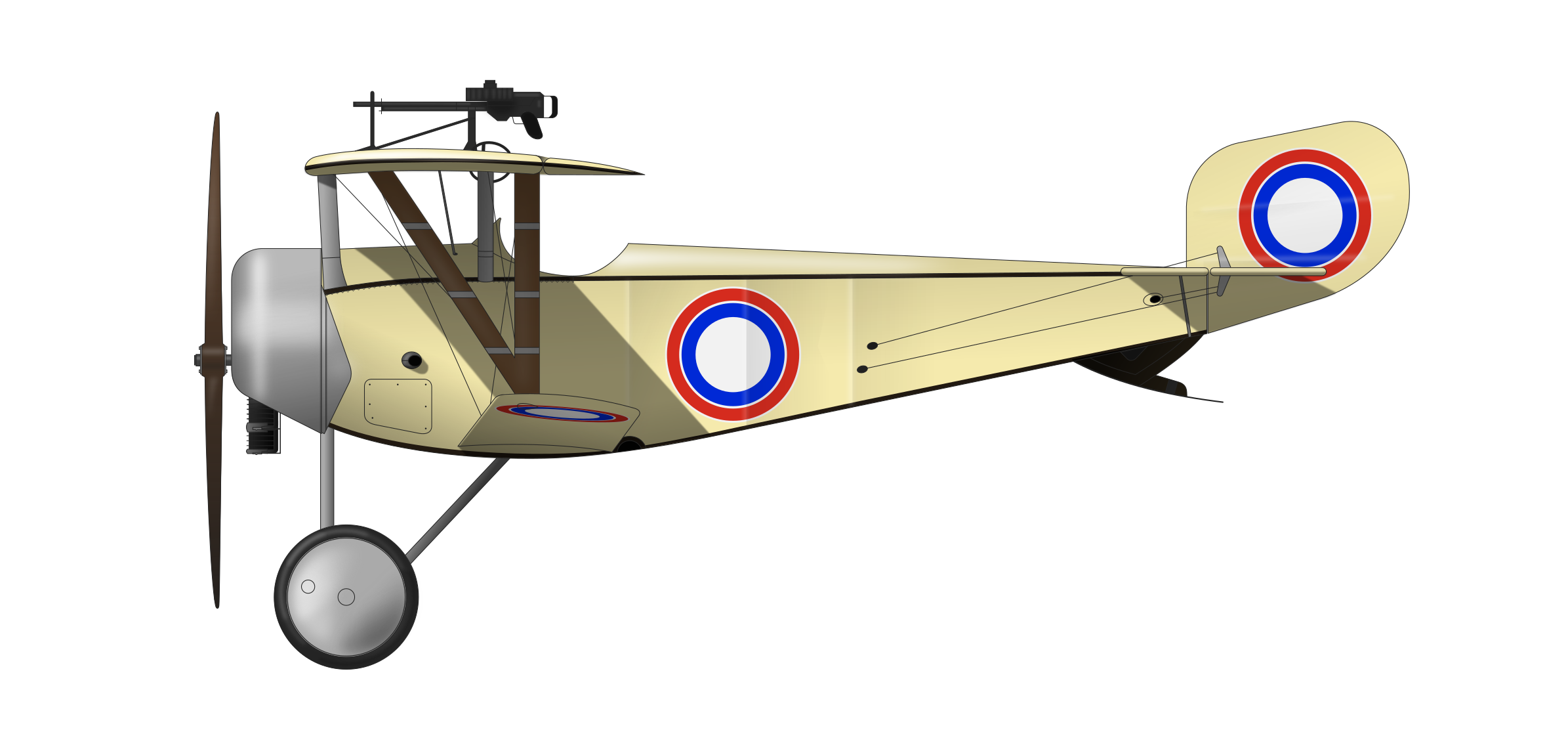
Ivan Loiko's Nieuport 11 (Romania, December 1916)

Weather over the turn of the year was poor for flying, though Loiko kept his hand in by flying several patrols every month. Air activity along the front did not pick up again until April 1917. Loiko scored his third win with his 11 May victory. A landing accident with Morane-Saulnier H s/n 732 on 13 June 1917 seriously damaged the machine, but left Loiko with minor injuries.

Loiko's victory string faded out as the October Revolution overtook the Russian Empire. Loiko's military career during the last year of World War I is unknown, though he is known to have remained with the 9th AOI.

=== Post World War I ===
In December 1918, Loiko joined the Volunteer Army as a Captain. He served on General Wrangell's staff, being promoted to Polkovnik. Pilots of the Volunteer Army constantly attacked Bolshevik cavalry, scattering them with bombs and strafing with machine guns, although it is noted that Loiko participated. However, when Wrangel's army evacuated Russia via the Crimea in November 1920, Loiko went along.

Beginning in 1921, he served as a flying instructor in the Kingdom of Yugoslavia's air force at Novi Sad. In 1923, Loiko defected back to Russia in a purloined Breguet 19. From 1924 to 1929, he served as a flight instructor in the new Soviet Air Force. His stint at the Second Flying School in Borisoglebsk ended in 1929, when he was indicted for espionage on behalf of Romania. He was sentenced to ten years imprisonment and sent off to the lead and zinc mines of Vaygach Island. He was released early, in 1934, but remained at Vaygach as a civilian employee. There is a strong suspicion that Ivan Loiko committed suicide in April 1936, though no definite proof.

== List of aerial victories ==
See also Aerial victory standards of World War I, List of World War I flying aces from the Russian Empire

Confirmed victories are numbered and listed chronologically.

| No. | Date/time | Aircraft | Foe | Result | Location | Notes |
|---|---|---|---|---|---|---|
| u/c | 3 October 1916 | Nieuport 10 serial number N714 | Enemy two-seater | Shot down; fell into enemy territory | Near Vatra Dornei | |
| 1 | 26 October 1916 | Morane-Saulnier L | Enemy aircraft | Enemy dived vertically toward Romanian defense lines | Mamalyga Station | |
| 2 | 27 December 1916 | Nieuport 11 | Hansa-Brandenburg C.I s/n 63.79 | Enemy aircrew captured after crashlanding near Russian troops | Onesti | Victim from Austro-Hungarian Fliegerkompanie 13 |
| 3 | 10 May 1917 | Morane-Saulnier I s/n MS732 | Enemy aircraft | Descended between Cașin River and Putna River | Between Cașin River and Putna River | |
| u/c | 18 July 1917 | Nieuport 17 serial number N1448 | Hansa-Brandenburg C.I s/n 67.52 | Observer KIA; Augustin Novák crashlanded near own troops near Comănești | Vermeshty | Victims from Austro-Hungarian Fliegerkompanie 39; verified by AH records. |
| 4 | 4 September 1917 | Nieuport 17 s/n N1443 | Enemy two-seater | Fell near Russian First Infantry Division trenches | South of Rădăuți, Romania | Victory shared with Grigoriy Suk |
| 5 | 6 September 1917 | Nieuport 17 s/n N1443 | Enemy two-seater | Crashed | Cuca, Argeș, Romania | Shared victory |
| u/c | 7 September 1917 | Nieuport 17 s/n N1448 | Enemy two-seater | | South of Raudatz | |
| u/c | 8 September 1917 @ 1830 hours | Nieuport 17 s/m N1448 | Enemy two-seater | Crashed | Unter-Gorodniki | Claim shared with Grigoriy Suk |
| 6 | 12 September 1917 | Nieuport 17 s/n N1448 | Hansa-Brandenburg C.I | Descended trailing smoke; landed behind own lines | Raudatz | Victim from Austro-Hungarian Fliegerkompanie 40; victory shared with Grigoriy Suk |
| 7 | 24 September 1917 | Nieuport 17 s/n N1448 | Hansa-Brandenburg C.I | Pilot landed back on own airfield with dead observer aboard | | |
| 8 | 3 October 1917 | Nieuport 23 s/n N5045 | Enemy aircraft | Wing broke; wallowing craft pitched observer overboard | Yazlovets | Shared victory |

== Honors and awards ==
- Order of Saint Anna Fourth Class with inscription "For Bravery"
- Order of Saint Anna Third Class with Sword and Ribbon
- Order of Saint Anna Second Class with Sword
- Order of Saint George Fourth Class
- Order of Saint George Second Class with Swords
- Order of Saint Stanilas Third Class with Swords and Ribbon
- Order of Saint Stanilas Second Class with Sword
- Order of Saint Vladimir Fourth Class with Sword and Ribbon
- Romanian Order of the Star of Romania
