= Evgeniya Shakhovskaya =

Russian aviator

Princess Evgeniya Shakhovskaya
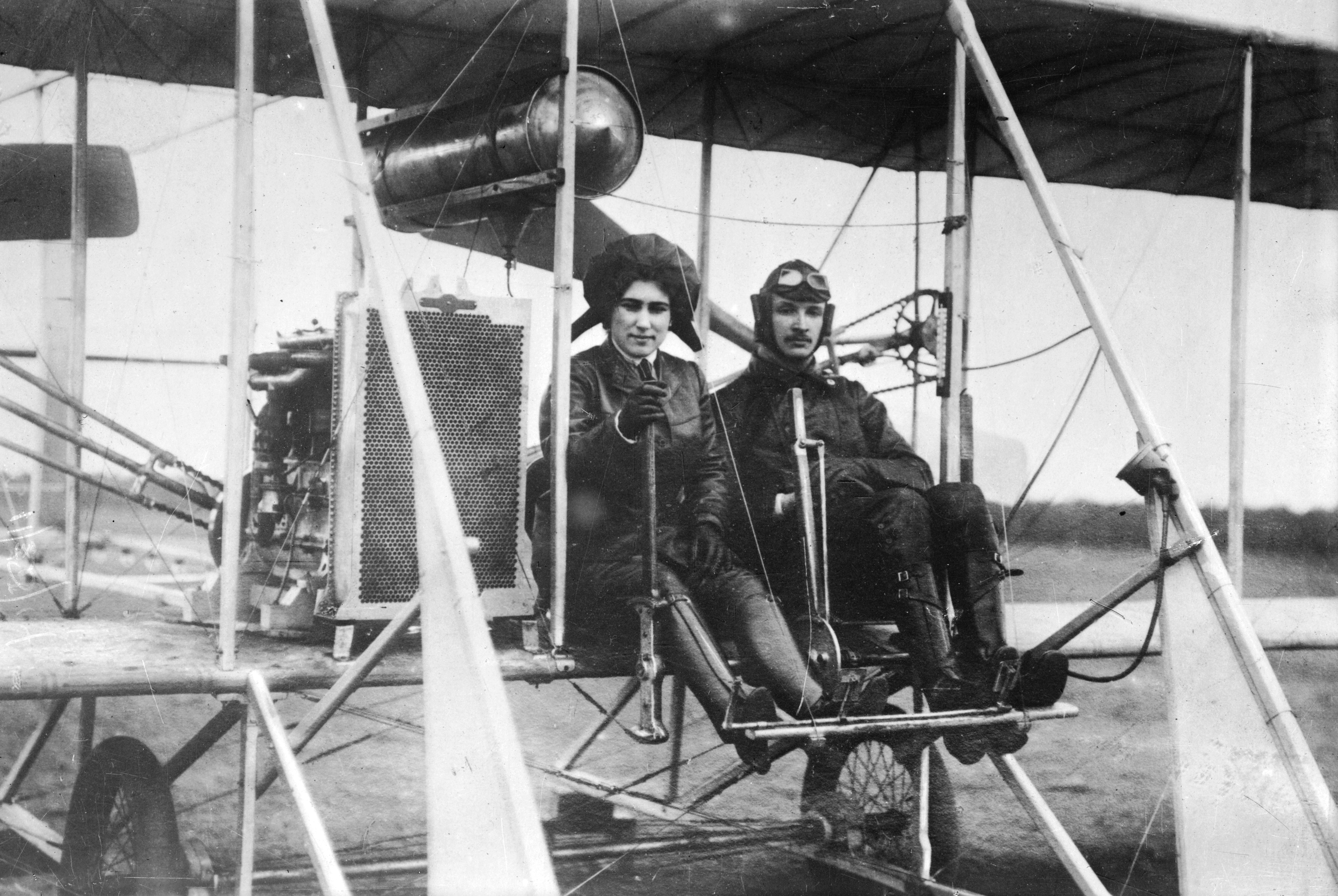
- Shakhovskaya and Abramovich Vsevolod Mikhaylovich in 1913
- Born: 1889; Saint Petersburg, Russian Empire
- Died: 1920 (aged 30–31); Kyiv, Ukrainian SSR
- Relatives: Nicholas II (cousin)

Princess Eugenie Mikhailovna Shakhovskaya (Russian: Евге́ния Миха́йловна Шаховска́я, Saint Petersburg, Russian Empire, 1889 - Kyiv, Ukrainian SSR, 1920) (Russian: Евгения Михайловна Шаховская, romanized: Yevgeniya Mikhaylovna Shakhovskaya) was a Russian pioneering aviator.

She was the first woman to become a military pilot when she flew reconnaissance missions for the Tsar in 1914.

She started taking flying lessons in 1911, and was awarded her flying license in 1912. However, she gave up flying in 1913 after her instructor died mid-flight.

She was convinced to start flying again and flew reconnaissance missions in World War I. Eugenie was accused of being a spy, arrested, and sentenced to death. However, she was shown mercy by the Tsar Nicholas II, her cousin, and sentenced to life in prison.

In 1917, during the Russian Revolution, she was freed from prison.

Following the revolution, she went over to the Bolsheviks and became the chief executioner for the Cheka in Ukraine. In this time, she also became addicted to drugs. In a narcotic state, she shot one of her assistants and was herself shot dead.
