= Aleksandr Pishvanov =

Russian flying ace (1893–1964)

Alexander Mikhailovich Pishvanov
- Born: 21 October 1893; Novocherkassk, Russian Empire
- Died: September 1964 (aged 70); New York City, New York, United States
- Military career
- Allegiance: Russian Empire; USA
- Branch: Aviation
- Service years: IRAS: 1914-1917
- Rank: Praporshik
- Unit: 10th Fighter Detachment of the Imperial Russian Air Service
- Awards: Order of Saint George Fourth Class, Cross of Saint George (4 awards), Order of Saint Stanilas Third Class, Order of Saint Vladimir Fourth Class with Swords and Ribbon, Order of Saint Anne Fourth Class
- Other work: Longtime employee of Republic Aircraft Corporation

Praporshik Aleksandr Mikhailovich Pishvanov was a World War I flying ace credited with five aerial victories. After an unsuccessful fight against the Communist takeover of Russia, he became an American citizen in 1928. His engineering skills were useful to both Sikorsky Aviation and to Seversky Aircraft Corporation from 1926 onwards. In 1942, he helped Walt Disney produce Victory Through Air Power to support the American war effort. Pishvanov's interest in aviation ended only with his death in New York City in 1964.

== Biography ==
=== Before World War I ===
Aleksandr Pishvanov was born in Novocherkassk, the Russian Empire on 21 October 1893, into a farm family of a dozen children. His family raised horses for the Russian cavalry, and wheat. Young Aleksandr disliked both horses and farming, so he gained a degree as an engineer. Pishvanov became interested in aviation while studying engineering. After graduation, he cadged a ride in an airplane in 1912. He subsequently trained as a pilot at the Odessa Aero Club, and was granted Aviator's Certificate No. 190 in October 1913.

=== World War I service ===
Pishvanov enlisted just after hostilities broke out, and began World War I as a Nijnichin in the cavalry, serving through Summer 1915, and winning all four classes of the Cross of Saint George. He then transferred to aviation. In Autumn 1915, he began pilot's training at the Sevastopol Military Flying School. He completed training on the Farman F.22 pusher on 28 January 1916, and progressed to learning the Voisin pusher. He finished this training on 26 March 1916; he graduated from the school the next month as a noncommissioned officer.

In early May 1916, he was posted to the 27th Corps Detachment as a pilot of two-seater reconnaissance aircraft. On 11 June, Pishvanov and his aerial observer used a Voisin to launch a pointblank attack on an enemy Albatros in the vicinity of Krevo-Kamenka at 2,000 meters altitude. Though the Albatros dropped out of range and was flown rapidly behind its own lines, the aerial victory went unconfirmed. Two months later, Pishvanov was sent to the Moscow Military Flying School for fighter conversion training to further develop his skills. He graduated qualified on Nieuports on 9 July. He was then posted on 7 August 1916 to the 10th Fighter Detachment near Volhynia at its commander's request, on the southwestern end of the Eastern Front. Assigned to fly Nieuport 9s armed with a Lewis gun, Pishvanov flew his first fighter sortie on 2 October 1916. In December, the 10th Fighter Detachment shifted to Galazi, Romania to fly guard over pontoon bridges over the Danube River, in an assignment that included no air-to-air combat.

While attached to the 10th Fighter Detachment, he used a Nieuport 21 to shoot down five enemy planes between 21 March and 7 July 1917. After downing enemy two-seaters in the vicinity of Galați on both 21 and 28 March 1917, he was promoted to Ensign and awarded the Order of Saint Anne, Fourth Class. On 15 April, he staked another victory claim, but it was unverified.

On one mission during the Summer of 1917, Smirnov had a vodka-saturated watermelon lashed to his Nieuport's outer wing strut. While taking a flight to cool it, he came under antiaircraft fire and took evasive action. The watermelon loosed itself and "bombed" the enemy trenches below. A report to the 10th Detachment from 10th Army noted: "Although the large bomb did not explode, it appears to have caused a great deal of confusion."

Pishvanov found himself in a hard-fought aerial battle on 26 June 1917. He fought several opponents to a standoff despite a machine gun that temporarily jammed after his first firing pass, then having hand grenades thrown at him. After seven attacks, he emerged the victor over a two-seater. He then received the Order of Saint Stanilas Third Class. On 4 July, he fought in five clashes along the Siret River. In the last one, he scored his fourth confirmed victory when he downed an Austro-Hungarian reconnaissance craft, Hansa-Brandenburg C.I serial number 68.54, over Endependance, having raked the two-seater with a surprise burst of bullets from less than 40 meters range. On the morning of the 7th, he finished his victory tally by shooting down an enemy two-seater over Latinul. He chased it down from 4,400 meters to 1,200 meters. Ignoring a leg wound inflicted by the observer's gunfire, he destroyed it with a pointblank burst. He was awarded the Order of Saint George Fourth Class and the Order of Saint Vladimir Fourth Class with Swords and Bow for this action. Also, on 9 July 1917, he was honored by the Supreme Commander in Chief's Order 599, which appointed Pishvanov a military pilot.

On 11 July 1917, he was wounded in combat, losing two fingers from his right hand. Closing to his usual close range to fire, he was wounded while his gun jammed. Undaunted, Pishvanov cleared the jam and chased the enemy plane back to its own territory. He then returned to base, only to wreck his Nieuport, number N1890.

On 5 September 1917, as a replacement for the craft in which he had scored all his victories, he was re-equipped with Nieuport 17 serial number N4191. He would fly this craft in September and October 1917. In December 1917, he was promoted to Poruchik. Also in December, in the wake of the October Revolution, Pishvanov would defect to his native Novocherkassk; there he joined the Volunteer Army of Generals Anton Denikin and Mikhail Alekseyev.

=== Post World War I ===
During the Summer of 1919, Pishvanov began to fly a Sopwith Camel in operations of the 6th Aviation Detachment against the Red Army; he was mentioned in orders by General Alexander Kutepov. However, as the Volunteer Army retreated as 1919 turned into 1920, the 6th Aviation Detachment was withdrawn to Grozny. To escape the surrounding Bolshevik forces, Pishvanov flew to newly independent Georgia and joined the Georgian Army. He also found employment with an automobile company. When the Red Army invasion of Georgia came in early 1921, he escaped through Iran to Great Britain. There he served for a time as a pilot instructor in the Royal Air Force.

In 1926, Pishanov emigrated to the United States to work for Sikorsky Aircraft Corporation as an engineer. He became an American citizen in 1928. In 1931, he changed employment to work for his fellow Russian emigre, Alexander de Seversky, at Seversky Aircraft Corporation. In 1942, Pishvanov and Seversky joined Walt Disney in making Victory Through Air Power to support the American war effort.

Alexandr Pishvanov died in New York City in 1964.

== Honors and awards ==
- Order of Saint George Fourth Class
- Cross of Saint George (all four classes)
- Order of Saint Stanilas Third Class
- Order of Saint Vladimir Fourth Class with Swords and Ribbon
- Order of Saint Anne Fourth Class
