= Aerial victory standards of World War I =

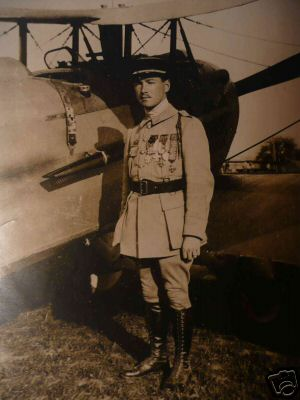
René Fonck, the highest scoring ace to survive the war, standing beside his Spad XIII

During World War I, the national air services involved developed their own methods of assessing and assigning credit for aerial victories. For various reasons, all belligerents engaged in overclaiming aerial victories to a greater or lesser degree. The accuracy of reported aerial victories varied widely according to definitions and terminology, how stricty the standards of verification were defined and upheld, and how well they were able to control for all sorts of cognitive biases in assessing the evidence of aerial victory claims.

== Introduction ==
As aerial combat was a new phenomenon at the war's outbreak, it drew a lot of attention in the press. The idea of "flying aces" (first coined by the French in 1915) who defeated multiple opponents in the skies quickly became popular, but initially there were no rules for determining who "won" an aerial engagement, or what criteria makes someone an "ace". Former Wings editor Wayne Ralph (2008) observed: 'In the First World War, the Second World War and also the Korean War, overclaiming was common; it varied by theatre, nation and individual, but it was inevitable.'

The victory scores of the pilots represented at List of World War I flying aces (pilots with at least five victories to their credit) often cannot be definitive, but are based on itemized lists that are the best available sources of information. Loss of records (especially records of casualties and lost aircraft, which are at their best a very good guide to the degree of over-claiming), by mischance and the passage of time – and the detail to which such records were kept in the first place – often complicates the reconstruction of the actual count for a given ace. Additionally, the German victory confirmation system began to buckle in February 1918; after August 1918, such records as survived were unit records. Ralph argued that 'books about aces create mythologies of good, better and best, portraying air-to-air combat as a kind of international sporting event where bronze, silver and gold medals are awarded based on scores. Any conclusions drawn from such simplistic rankings are meaningless.'

World War I began the historical experience that has shown that approximately five percent of combat pilots account for the majority of air-to-air victories in warfare, thus showing the importance of flying aces.

== Allies of World War I ==
=== Belgium ===
Enemy aircraft had to fall within friendly lines in a nation partially occupied by the enemy, or be seen by friendly ground troops falling within German lines, to be counted. Confirmation by fellow friendly pilots was not allowed. Thus, unconfirmed claims outnumbered official victories.

Although the Belgian system of counting victories supposedly mirrored the French system more than the British one, victory lists for Belgian aces still contain confirmed claims for FTL (forced to land) and OOC (out of control) victories. Inspection of the Belgian pilots' victory lists also show victories being shared without being fractionally divided.

=== France ===
French victory confirmation standards were strict. Credit was given only for the destruction of an enemy aircraft, and the destruction had to be witnessed by an independent witness, such as an artillery observer, infantryman, or another pilot. The victories certified generally fell into one of four categories of destruction:

1. An enemy aircraft independently witnessed falling in flames;
2. An enemy aircraft independently witnessed crashing to earth;
3. An enemy aircraft independently witnessed disintegrating while in flight;
4. An enemy aircraft falling into captivity behind the battle lines of the French or their allies.

Probable victories would not count on a pilot's score, although they would be noted. Examples of probable victories could be enemy aircraft falling out of control but not seen to impact, or a claim lacking independent confirmation.

Observers as well as pilots could become aces. Victories could be shared, and counted as an addition of one to the score of each 'victor' rather than being divided fractionally. In some cases, a single destroyed German or Austro-Hungarian aircraft could add to the scores of half a dozen or more French fliers.

=== Great Britain and the British Commonwealth ===
Counting of "aerial victories" by the British was shaped by the high command's determination to sustain an ongoing aerial offensive, as well as the prevailing westerly winds on the Western Front. From the start, the British counted actions that foiled German intentions as victorious. Their count system was skewed toward recognizing the moral victory of thwarting enemy offensive actions as well as the physical one of destroying his aircraft.

1. A British or Commonwealth pilot of the Royal Flying Corps and Royal Naval Air Service, or Australian pilots of the Australian Flying Corps could be credited with a victory for destroying an enemy plane, for driving it down out of control, capturing it, or destroying an enemy observation balloon. In the earliest days of aerial combat, in 1915 and 1916, victories could also be awarded for forcing an enemy aircraft to land in either Allied or enemy territory.
2. By 1917, the number of "out of control", "driven down" and "forced to land" victories were overloading the scoring system. As aerial combat soared to the point where British pilots might submit 50 claims on a given day, the count system became overwhelmed. By May 1918, the new Royal Air Force supposedly ceased reporting "out of control" victories as part of pilots' scores, but still credited them to pilots for the purposes of awarding decorations. Victories were limited to enemy aircraft destroyed, enemy airplanes driven down out of control if they seemed so damaged they would crash, and airplanes captured. Squadron, Brigade, and Wing headquarters all kept track of individual and unit scores.
3. The approval system began with a Combat Report from the Squadron submitted to Wing HQ. They in turn passed the report on to Brigade HQ. Either Wing or Brigade could approve or disapprove it; sometimes one would confirm the victory while the other would not.
4. Victories were reported by RFC HQ via Communiqué. The deadline for the daily Communiqué (nicknamed "Comic Cuts" by RFC pilots) was 1600 hours (4 p.m.). Following a system that did not always report an event on the day it actually occurred added to the confusion caused by dual reporting.
5. In cases where more than one pilot (or observer) was involved in a British victory, practice was especially inconsistent. Since after all only one enemy aircraft had been destroyed, the victory at unit level (to the squadron or wing for instance) was counted as one. On the other hand, in some cases all pilots concerned might receive a full credit to his personal score, as victories at this time were not divided fractionally, in the way that became common practice later. As a striking example of this, no fewer than twelve Royal Flying Corps pilots each claimed a victory because they helped destroy an Albatros D.III on 8 April 1917. However, some squadrons counted such victories only to the unit concerned without crediting them to an individual, or counted "shared" scores separately from a particular pilot's 'solo' victories. In the case of two-seater crews, both pilot and observer might each receive credit for a victory. The usual rule of thumb credited all victories to the pilot of a Sopwith 1½ Strutter or Bristol F.2 Fighter two-seater, but the observer/gunner was credited only for those instances where he fired his weapon. Some squadrons kept separate lists of pilot and observer aces; some did not.
6. Unlike other air forces of the time, British authorities did not necessarily require independent ground verification of a victory to award credit.

=== Italy ===
Italian standards for aerial victory confirmation included:

1. The enemy aircraft fell in Italian-held territory and could be confirmed, or
2. Other Allied Powers pilots and/or ground observers could independently confirm an enemy's destruction.
3. Victories could be shared, with more than one pilot and/or gunner receiving full credit for a victory.
4. The system codified by Pier Piccio (an ace and by then the Inspector of Fighter Units) in Istruzione provvisoria di impiego delle Squadriglie da Caccia ("Provisional Instruction for the Use of the Fighter Squadrons") in June 1918 called for at least two confirmations from artillery, balloon, or frontline observers.
5. In January 1919, the intelligence branch of Commando Generale di Aeronautica ("General Command of Aeronautics") hastily drew up a list of pilots credited with any aerial victories during the war, which came to a close in November 1918; evaluative criteria are unknown, thus casting doubt on the final totals.

=== United States ===
Pilots from the USA had their victory totals defined several different ways. If and when they served with British aviation, their victories were determined via British methods; indeed, no fewer than 40 American aces served solely in British units. It was equally true that Americans serving in French units were evaluated via French standards; there were just four American aces who served solely in French units.

The US Army Air Service would adopt French standards for evaluating American victories scored for the USAAS, with one exception–during the summer of 1918, while flying under operational control of the British, the 17th Aero Squadron and the 148th Aero Squadron naturally used British standards.

American observers could become aces. Victories could be shared between aviators. USAAS records, which tracked only those victories scored by Americans in the USAAS, showed 1,513 victories were credited to individual pilots or observers for the destruction of 756 German airplanes and 76 observation balloons; 341 of the victories were shared to some extent, proving that the sharing of victories was common enough to be the norm. However, the USAAS did not track victories won by Americans in other countries' air forces.

=== Romania ===
In 1916, the Romanian General Headquarters decided that an air victory would correspond to a downed aircraft. If several aviators shot down the same airplane, only the one considered to have delivered the coup de grâce would be granted the victory. In the case of a collective victory in which it was not known who gave the coup de grâce, the victory was attributed to the squadron or group to which the involved aviators belonged.

=== Russian Empire ===
The Russian Empire had no known aerial victory standards.

== Central Powers of World War I ==
=== Austria-Hungary ===
Every aircrew member significantly contributing to the defeat of an enemy aircraft was credited with a full victory. All victories counted equally, whether the aviator scored them as a fighter pilot, a reconnaissance pilot, or an aerial observer/gunner.

For six to eight months in early 1918, the rules were tightened to allow only one verified victory per combat claim. This restriction was later revoked, and the former rule of shared victories reinstated.

Austro-Hungarian authorities did credit enemy aircraft that were forced to land as actual victories. This can be noted throughout the victory records of their aces.

=== Germany ===
At the start of the era of the Fokker Scourge in July 1915, no dedicated "fighter" aviation units existed within what was then called the Fliegertruppe serving the German Army — the pioneering Fokker Eindecker fighters were distributed singly or in pairs, to protect the six two-seat aircraft that each Feldflieger Abteilung Army aerial observation unit used for front-line reconnaissance. When future "ace" pilots like Leutnant Kurt Wintgens and Leutnant Otto Parschau began accumulating victories over Allied aircraft from their early Eindecker fighters, the downed Allied aircraft had to fall on the German side of the front lines to be counted as a "confirmed" aerial victory, or be seen to fall from the sky by either fellow Fliegertruppe aviators aloft with the fighter pilots, or fellow army ground observers. On 15 July 1915 Wintgens achieved the first confirmed German victory over a Morane-Saulnier Type L "parasol" monoplane, despite his previous pair of victories on 1 and 4 July against other French-flown Type L "parasol" two-seaters, both of which fell on the Allied side of the lines, and thus not counting as "confirmed" aerial victories by official German standards of the time.

The two most famous 1915–16 era aces of the German Empire's Fliegertruppe, Oswald Boelcke and Max Immelmann would achieve a six-victory total each to earn the House Order of Hohenzollern by early November 1915 for those confirmed victories, and when each of their totals reached eight, the much-coveted Pour le Mérite was awarded to each ace on the same day, 12 January 1916.

The Germans did not use the term 'ace' but referred to German pilots who had achieved 10 kills as Kanone ("big gun") and publicized their names and scores, for the benefit of civilian morale – this term is not known to have come into use before May 1916, however, as when a pilot before that time achieved a total of four confirmed victories, they were most likely to start being cited in official Army communiqués. The German military's verification methods for scoring a "confirmed" aerial victory were rigorous, and became more so later in the war. By 1916, as the dedicated Jasta fighter squadrons were forming within the newly named Luftstreitkräfte in October 1916, every victory had to be claimed in a combat report to his commanding officer. The report was passed up the chain of command for evaluation. Downed enemy aircraft that landed behind the German lines of trenchwork were easily confirmed. Those that fell behind enemy lines had to be verified by a German observer. All victories were credited to a single specific pilot. In case of insoluble disagreement over a given victim, the victory would be credited to a unit, but not to an individual. The sole exception to this was the awarding of a victory each to the pilot and observer of a successful two-seater.

== See also ==
- Balloon busters
- Confirmation bias
- Confirmation and overclaiming of aerial victories during World War II
- Fog of war
- Ghost of Kyiv
- Lists of World War I flying aces

== Literature ==
- Dunnigan, James F. (2003). How to Make War: A Comprehensive Guide to Modern Warfare in the Twenty-first Century. Fourth Edition. New York: Harper Collins. p. 672. ISBN 9780060090128.
- Nicoară, Marius-Adrian (2017). "Despre Așii Aviației Române în Războiul de Întregire națională" (PDF). Buletinul Arhivelor Militare Române (in Romanian). No. 78/2017. Centrul Tehnic-Editorial al Armatei. ISSN 1454-0924.
- O'Connor, Martin D. (1994). Air Aces of the Austro-Hungarian Empire, 1914–1918. Stratford, Connecticut: Flying Machines Press. p. 336. ISBN 978-0-9637110-1-4.
- Ralph, Wayne (2008). Aces, Warriors and Wingmen: The Firsthand Accounts of Canada's Fighter Pilots in the Second World War. Mississauga: John Wiley & Sons. p. 288. ISBN 978-0-470-15814-2.
- Sumner, Ian (2005). German Air Forces 1914–18. Botley, Oxfordshire: Osprey Publishing. p. 64. ISBN 9781841769240.
- VanWyngarden, Greg (2006). Early German Aces of World War I. Osprey Aircraft of the Aces #73. Botley, Oxfordshire: Osprey Publishing. ISBN 978-1-84176-997-4.
- Varriale, Paolo (2009). Italian Aces of World War 1. Osprey Publishing. ISBN 978-1-84603-426-8.

Above the Trenches Series

- Shores, Christopher F.; Franks, Norman L. R.; Guest, Russell (1990). Above the Trenches: A Complete Record of the Fighter Aces and Units of the British Empire Air Forces 1915–1920. Above the Trenches Series. London: Grub Street Publishing. ISBN 0-948817-19-4.
- Franks, Norman L. R.; Bailey, Frank W. (1992). Over the Front: A Complete Record of the Fighter Aces and Units of the United States and French Air Services, 1914–1918. Above the Trenches Series. Grub Street Publishing. ISBN 978-0-948817-54-0. OCLC 28223455.
- Franks, Norman L. R.; Bailey, Frank W.; Guest, Russell (1993). Above the Lines: The Aces and Fighter Units of the German Air Service, Naval Air Service and Flanders Marine Corps, 1914–1918. Above the Trenches Series. London: Grub Street Publishing. ISBN 0-948817-73-9.
- Pieters, Walter M. (1998). Above Flanders' Fields: A Complete Record of the Belgian Fighter Pilots and Their Units During the Great War, 1914–1918. Above the Trenches Series. London: Grub Street Publishing. ISBN 1-898697-83-3.
