= Yury Gilsher =

WW1 Russian Cavalryman and aviator

Yury Vladimirovich Gilsher
- Ю. В. Гилшер
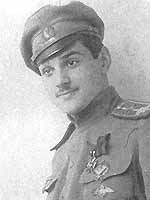
- Born: 27 November 1894; Moscow, Russian Empire
- Died: 20 July 1917 (aged 22) near Tarnopol, Russian Empire (now Ternopil, Ukraine)
- Burial place: Buchach, Ukraine
- Military career
- Allegiance: Russian Empire
- Branch: Imperial Russian Army; Imperial Russian Air Force
- Service years: c. 1914–1917
- Rank: Cavalry Second Lieutenant
- Units: 4th Army Air Detachment; 7th Fighter Detachment
- Commands: 7th Fighter Detachment
- Awards: Order of St. George; Order of St. Vladimir; Golden Sword for Bravery; Order of St. Anne

Cavalry Second Lieutenant Yury Vladimirovich Gilsher (Russian: Ю́рий Влади́мирович Ги́лшер) (27 November 1894 – 20 July 1917) was a Russian fighter ace of World War I. Initially a cavalryman, but then an airman, Gilsher overcame two serious injuries to become an ace. After suffering a fracture of both bones in his right forearm, he later lost a foot to amputation because of a crash. He returned to duty with a prosthetic foot. Gilsher rose to his unit's command and scored five victories between April and July 1917 before being killed in action on 20 July 1917.

== Early life and cavalry service ==
Gilsher was born in Moscow, the Russian Empire, on 27 November 1894, to a noble family. He was educated at Moscow's Alexeyevskoye Commercial School.

Bucking the traditions of his social class, he enrolled in university and studied civil engineering instead of joining the military. He graduated in early 1914. however upon the outbreak of war he volunteered for the Imperial Russian Army, He trained as a cavalryman at the Nicholas Cavalry College, in which he enrolled on 13 December 1914. He graduated from the Saint Petersburg school as a Praporshchik on 14 June 1915. His class's equestrian maneuvers had several times been disrupted by overflying aircraft spooking horses and cadets alike.

== Aviation career ==
While he was still in cavalry training, Gilsher applied for a transfer to aviation. On 16 June 1915, he was forwarded to aviation training at the Gatchina Flying School. He graduated on 21 October 1915, and was posted to the 4th Army Air Detachment. Nine days later, he was designated as a military pilot. On 9 November, the new unit moved forward into combat. However, Gilsher's career suffered a setback on 20 November when a propeller fractured both bones in his right forearm while he was starting an aircraft engine. He was removed from the unit and assigned to Moscow's Dux aircraft factory as a quality control inspector until he healed.

After recovery, he underwent advanced flight training on fighters in Odessa during February 1916 and returned to active service on 21 March 1916, posted to the 7th Fighter Aviation Detachment. The unit transferred to combat duty at Tarnopol. On 12 April 1916, Gilsher was promoted to Kornet.

On 10 May 1916, Gilsher and his aerial observer flew a sortie in Sikorsky S-16 serial no. 201. They attacked a German Aviatik B.III and downed it. Upon their return to base, the fighter plane went into a spin at 1,200 meters because the left elevator jammed. Both Gilsher and his observer survived the crash with serious injuries; Gilsher's left foot was amputated. Gilsher was awarded the Order of Saint Vladimir Fourth Class with Swords and Bow for this mission.

Gilsher's flying career seemed ended, but he lobbied vigorously to return to action. On 13 November 1916, the Military Air Fleet Department redesignated him as a military pilot and returned him to duty with his old unit. He was given temporary command of the 7th Fighter Aviation Detachment, as its commander was sent to France to study French air tactics. Gilsher promptly fabricated an improvised pioneering flight simulator out of an old cockpit. After using the simulator for a thorough ground re-familiarization with Nieuport fighters, he taught himself to fly in the vicinity of his airfield, using his artificial foot. On 22 November 1916, he returned to combat, flying both a photographic reconnaissance mission and a fighter sortie. The photographs were an intelligence coup, disclosing several formerly unknown German artillery batteries.

He scored two victories in April 1917, both on the 13th. Then, on 15 May, he engaged an Austro-Hungarian two seater; after its observer fired all his ammunition, including signal flares, he tried to surrender. Gilsher shot him down anyhow.

Gilsher was appointed temporary commander of the 7th Fighter Detachment from time to time. He was being considered for command of the 4th Fighter Detachment when the 7th's commander, Ivan Orlov, was killed in action on 4 July 1917. Gilsher succeeded to command of the 7th. He inherited a unit undermined by political dissension on the home front, and running down from delayed maintenance and short supplies.

His final two victories came in July 1917 – firstly on 17 July near Posuhov. The next day, in a letter, Gilsher lamented the condition of his equipment: "...my old Nieuport is not as reliable as before. My worn out Le Rhone engine is very dangerous and my Lewis gun is breaking all the time."

His final victory was on 20 July 1917 when he and Vasili Yanchenko shared a victory near Tarnopol, in modern-day Ukraine. Gilsher, Vasili Yanchenko, and Donat Makijonek took off in the evening, intent on intercepting seven German intruders. Makijonek was side-tracked into a dogfight, leaving the other two to the interception mission. As the Russian duo met the invaders over Tarnopol, they found themselves trapped by a second formation of eight enemy aircraft squeezing the Russians into a trap. Nevertheless, Gilsher and Yanchenko attacked and brought down one enemy. However, as they lined up for a second assault, enemy fire hit Gilsher's plane. Yanchenko saw the motor drop from Gilsher's Nieuport, followed almost instantaneously by its wings crumpling. Yanchenko managed to elude the foe, to land near the wreckage. He removed Gilsher's body from the wreckage and returned it to Tarnopol.

Yury Gilsher was buried near Buchach, in the Galicia region on 21 July 1917.

== Decorations ==
- Order of St. Vladimir, 4th Class with Swords and Bow: ca 10 May 1916
- Order of St. George, 4th Class: 28 May 1917
- Order of St. Anne, 4th Class: 2 June 1917
- Gold Sword for Bravery: 4 December 1917

== List of aerial victories ==
See also Aerial victory standards of World War I, List of World War I flying aces from the Russian Empire

Confirmed victories are numbered and listed chronologically.

No.	Date/time	Aircraft	Foe	Result	Location	Notes
u/c	10 May 1916	Sikorsky S-16 serial no. 201	Aviatik B.III serial no. 33.02	Aviatik captured	Vicinity of Burkanov	Victim from Austro-Hungarian Fliegerkompanie 20; loss verified in Austro-Hungarian records
1	13 April 1917	Nieuport 21 serial no. N1872	Hansa-Brandenburg C.I	Shot down in flames	West of Maidanska Buda	Victory over victim from Austro-Hungarian Fliegerkompanie 7 shared with Makeenok and Yanchenko
2	13 April 1917	Nieuport 21 serial no. N1872	Hansa-Brandenburg C.I	Austro-Hungarian pilot returned to base with wounded observer	Vicinity of Posetch, Galicia	Victory shared with Yanchenko
3	15 May 1917	Nieuport 21	Albatros C.II serial no. 52.52	Destroyed on ground by Russian artillery fire	Boushuv	Victim from Austro-Hungarian Fliegerkompanie 25
4	17 July 1917 @ 1100 hours	Nieuport 11 serial no. N1679	Enemy aircraft	Destroyed by artillery fire after crashlanding	Southwest of Posucho	
5	20 July 1917	Nieuport 21	Enemy aircraft	Last seen descending steeply	Tarnopol	Victory shared with Yanchenko

== See also ==
- List of World War I flying aces from the Russian Empire
- List of World War I flying aces
