= Donat Makijonek =

Polish flying ace (1890–1941)

Donat Aduiovich Makijonek
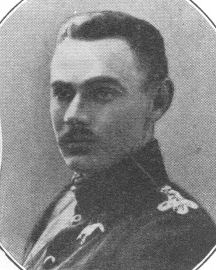
- Born: 19 May 1890; Dambovka, Russian Empire
- Died: 18 June 1941 (aged 51); Auschwitz-Birkenau, German-occupied Poland
- Military career
- Allegiance: Russian Empire
- Branch: Infantry; Imperial Russian Air Service; Polish Air Force
- Rank: Captain
- Units: Russian: 97th Infantry Liflandsky Regiment, 3rd Korpusnoi Aviatsionniy Otryad (Corps Aviation Detachment), 7th Aviatsionniy Otryad Istrebitlei (Fighter Aviation Detachment),
- Commands: 1st Polish Aviation Detachment, 3rd Polish Squadron
- Awards: Russian Empire: Order of Saint George Fourth Class, Cross of Saint George (1st, 2nd, 3rd, and 4th Class Awards), Order of Saint Vladimir (4th Class award), Order of Saint Stanislaus (Imperial House of Romanov) (2nd and 3rd Class awards), Order of Saint Anna (3rd and 4th Class Awards), Polish: Virtuti Militari Fifth Class, Cross of Valor, Order of the Cross of Independence, Medaille de la Victoire, Serbian awards: Order of the Orla Bialego
- Other work: Helped found Polish military aviation; fought in Polish-Soviet War

Poruchik Donat Aduiovich Makijonek (19 May 1890 – 18 June 1941) was a World War I flying ace credited with eight aerial victories. He was the only ace of Polish ethnic heritage to fight against the Central Powers. In later life, he would help found Polish military aviation immediately after World War I, and fight in the Polish-Soviet War of 1919-1921.

== Biography ==
=== Early life and prewar service ===
Donat Makijonek was born into a peasant family in the village of Dambovka, Osvedskoy volost, the province of Vitebsk, in the Russian Empire on 19 May 1890. He was ethnically Polish, and was raised in the Roman Catholic faith. He was schooled in a vocational technical school in Vitebsk. He graduated in 1906, at age 16. On 7 November 1911, he was conscripted into the 97th Infantry Liflandsky Regiment for his military service. At the time he joined, the Imperial Russian Air Service planned to expand greatly the following year.

In December 1911, Makijonek requested posting to aviation duty. On 4 April 1912, he transferred to 3rd Korpusnoi Aviatsionniy Otryad (Corps Aviation Detachment) of the 4th Aviation Company. On 10 June 1912, he was forwarded to the Sevastopol Military Flying School for training as a motor mechanic; he subsequently served the school in that capacity. The IRAS at that time could not find sufficient officers for pilot's training; they consequently opened the training to enlisted men. Makijonek applied for, and was accepted for, pilot's training and trained on the Nieuport IV monoplane. He graduated from training on 7 March 1914, being granted brevet number 239. He was then promoted thrice in quick succession–on 17 May 1914 to Efreitor; on 1 June 1914 to Mladshy Unter-Officer; and on 27 June 1914 to Starshyi Unter-Officer (Senior Sergeant).

=== World War I service ===
Three days after the start of hostilities, the 3rd Korpusnoi Aviatsionniy Otryad (Corps Aviation Detachment), including Makijonek, was committed to combat in eastern Prussia. This early in the war, he flew a two-seater Nieuport IV on reconnaissance missions. On 21 August 1914, Makijonek air-couriered vital orders from higher headquarters to General Huseyn Khan Nakhchivanski of the Guards Cavalry Corps; the pilot earned the Cross of St. George Fourth Class for this feat. The next month, September 1914, Makijonek took transition training for the Morane-Saulnier Ls with which the 3rd KAO was re-equipping, as its existing craft were badly worn. He completed the training on 19 November and returned to his unit. The 3rd KAO ended 1914 back on active status as of 23 December, though flying few flights due to winter weather conditions.

Such missions as were flown in early 1915 were exposed to the hazard of anti-aircraft fire. On 27 April 1915, Makijonek was flying reconnaissance in Morane-Saulnier G serial number MS107 when a bullet hit his engine. After the motor stopped, he barely stretched his glide over enemy lines to safety with Russian troops near Nida. He pulled his aerial observer from the overturned aircraft and hustled them both in a crawl into a nearby trench as enemy artillery rained in on the wreckage. The feat won the doughty young pilot the Third Class Cross of Saint George, awarded 28 April 1915.

On 16 June 1915, Makijonek and his observer espied an enemy offensive abuilding in the vicinity of Sandomierz; a bridge was being built across the San River to convey an attack into Russian territory. A timely report of this to Russian headquarters garnered him a Second Class award of the Cross of Saint George, and a promotion to Podpraporshchik on the 19th. Makijonek's brave performances continued through the Summer of 1915; on 4 October 1915, his courage earned him a deserved promotion to Praporshchik.

It was also in October that the 3rd KAO was withdrawn from combat and sent for a rest in Odessa. With the exception of training flights, the unit stood down for nearly a month. They entrained to return to action on 12 December 1915, their unit now being posted to the Imperial Russian 7th Army. By year's end, they were back in action.

On 13 January 1916, Donat Makijonek was deemed experienced enough to be appointed as a military pilot by Imperial Order. Sometime thereafter, he applied for training on fighter aircraft. After acceptance, he trained on Nieuport 11s at Odessa. He graduated on 12 August 1916, and was commissioned into the officer's ranks as a Podporuchik. In December 1916, he was assigned to the 7th Aviatsionniy Otryad Istrebitlei (Fighter Aviation Detachment), which was based near Tarnopol and commanded by Ivan Orlov. Makijonek fought several furious engagements during February 1917, though without success. He realized that an experienced wingman would improve his chances. He struck up both a working partnership and a close friendship with Vasili Yanchenko.

He won for the first time on 7 March 1917, splitting the victory with Yanchenko. Five weeks later, on 13 April, Makijonek shared a pair of triumphs with both Yanchenko and Juri Gilsher. On 16 April and 29 June, he scored clean solo victories. On 4 July 1917, his commander, Ivan Orlov, was killed in action; Gilsher assumed command. On both the 6th and the 11th, Makijonek and Yanchenko once again shared victories.

On 20 July, Makijonek, Gilsher, and Yanchenko flew an evening sortie to intercept eight enemy fighters. Makijonek was waylaid en route by an enemy fighter, and engaged it. Gilsher and Yanchenko flew into a lopsided battle against 16 enemy aircraft. Juri Gilsher died in action when his aircraft fell apart in midair. After his commander's death, Makijonek stepped into the vacant command slot.

There are two versions of what transpired next. According to one source, Makijonek was severely wounded while scoring his eighth victory on 5 August 1917. He was medically evacuated, winding up in a hospital in Sevastopol. While convalescing, his promotion to Poruchik came through on 27 September 1917. On 8 November 1917, he returned to frontline duty, to find the Russian forces pretty much inactive. A more recent source relates that he took his last flight on 19 August 1917. In this account, he staked two combat claims that went unapproved. Then, on the 24th, he fell ill and was superseded in his command. He was then sent to the rear to "study machine gun techniques" at Evpatoria in the Crimea. Makijonek ended up in the Red Cross hospital in Sevastopol at first. While there, he was promoted to Stabskapitän on 27 September 1917. He then attended the machine gun course, graduating in November. He was sent to Petrograd to work in the Aviation and Aeronautic Department, but its work had ground to a halt because of the Revolution. In this version, he then returned to the 7th AOI.

Regardless of which version is true, Makijonek next applied for a transfer to the Polish Corps on the basis of a Supreme Committee order for unifying the Poles in Russian service. On 18 January 1918, Captain Makijonek loaded his mechanic into a two-seater and flew to Kamianets-Podilskyi. He left the Imperial Russian Air Service after almost 600 combat missions and more than 30 aerial battles. In the process, he had operated 14 types of aircraft.

=== Post World War I life ===
Makijonek helped found the 1st Polish Aviation Detachment, and became its deputy commander. In 1919, he was a member of the commission that selected the Plage i Laśkiewicz factory for building new Ansaldo airplanes. By the time the Polish–Soviet War began in 1920, Makijonek commanded the 3rd Polish Squadron. He was still in command in 1921, after the war's end. After that, little is known of him. He is believed to have died in Auschwitz concentration camp during World War II. Auschwitz records report Donat Makijonek {KZ # 16301} born 15 May 1891, occupation chauffeur, as having arrived at Auschwitz 24 May 1941; date of passing away is unknown

== List of aerial victories ==
Confirmed victories are numbered and listed chronologically. Unconfirmed victories are denoted by "u/c".

| No. | Date/time | Aircraft | Foe | Result | Location | Notes |
|---|---|---|---|---|---|---|
| u/c | 28 March 1916 | Morane-Saulnier L serial number MS239 | Enemy aircraft | Forced down | Leszowka | |
| 1 | 7 March 1917 | Nieuport 21 s/n 2453 | Enemy aircraft | | Vicinity of Svistelniki | Victory shared with Vasili Yanchenko |
| 2 | 13 April 1917 @ 0900 hours | Nieuport 21 s/n 2453 | Hansa-Brandenburg C.I s/n 67.04 | Burst into flames upon impact with the ground | Bogorodchany | Victory shared with Juri Gilsher and Yanchenko; enemy aircrew from Austro-Hungarian Fliegerkompanie 7 |
| 3 | 13 April 1917 @ 0900 hours | Nieuport 21 s/n 2453 | Hansa-Brandenburg C.I s/n 67.03 | Machine destroyed in crashlanding in own territory | Bogorodchany | Victory shared with Juri Gilsher and Yanchenko; enemy aircrew from Flik 7 |
| 4 | 16 April 1917 | Nieuport 21 s/n 2453 | Enemy aircraft | Crashlanded | Between Yamritsa and Kozerki | |
| u/c | 27 April 1917 | Nieuport 21 s/n 2453 | Enemy aircraft | Crashlanded | Kozerki | |
| 5 | 29 June 1917 | Nieuport 21 s/n 2453 | Enemy two-seater aircraft | Forced crashlanding | Wola Marzeńska, present day Poland | |
| 6 | 6 July 1917 | Nieuport 21 s/n N1889 | Enemy aircraft | Impact barely within enemy lines | Vicinity of Berezhany | Victory shared with Yanchenko |
| 7 | 11 July 1917 | Nieuport 17 | Enemy aircraft | Crashed while smoking heavily | Berezhany | Victory shared with Yanchenko |
| 8 | 5 August 1917 | Nieuport 17 | Enemy two-seater | Crashed | Berezhany | Victory shared with Yanchenko |
| u/c | 19 August 1917 | Nieuport 21 s/n N2453 | Enemy aircraft | Forced landing | Vicinity of Chabarowka | |
| u/c | 19 August 1917 | Nieuport 21 s/n N2453 | Enemy aircraft | Forced landing on own airfield | Vicinity of Kopychyntsi | |

== Honors and awards ==
Russian Empire awards:

- Order of St. George Fourth Class: Awarded in Autumn 1917
- Cross of St. George Fourth Class: Awarded circa September 1914
- Cross of St. George Third Class: Award number 21450 granted 28 April 1915
- Cross of St. George Second Class: Award number 602
- Cross of St. George First Class
- Order of St. Vladimir Fourth Class with Sword and Ribbon: Awarded 28 April 1916
- Order of St. Anna Fourth Class
- Order of St. Anna Third Class with Sword and Ribbon
- Order of St. Stanislaus Third Class with Sword and Ribbon
- Order of St. Stanislaus Second Class with Sword

Polish awards:

- Virtuti Militari Fifth Class
- Cross of Valor
- Order of the Cross of Independence
- Medaille de la Victoire

Serbian awards:

- Order of the White Eagle
