= Ivan Orlov (aviator) =

WW1 Russian flying ace

Ivan Alexandrovich Orlov
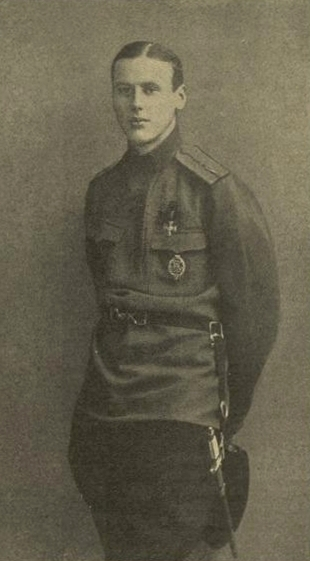
- Born: 19 January 1895; St. Petersburg, Russian Empire
- Died: 4 July 1917 (aged 22)
- Military career
- Allegiance: Russian Empire
- Branch: Imperial Russian Air Service
- Service years: 1914-1917
- Rank: Podporuchik
- Units: 5th Corps Air Detachment, IRAS; First Army Aviation Detachment, IRAS; Escadrille 3, Aéronautique Militaire
- Awards: Cross of St. George Fourth Class, Cross of St. George Third Class, Cross of St. George Second Class, Order of Saint Anne Fourth Class, Order of Saint Anne Third Class, Order of Saint George Fourth Class, Order of Saint Stanislas Third Class with Crossed Swords and Bow, Order of Saint Vladimir Fourth Class with Crossed Swords and Bow, Gold Sword for Bravery, French Croix de Guerre with palm

Podporuchik Ivan Aleksandrovich Orlov (19 January 1895 – 4 July 1917) was a Russian flying ace during World War I. He was a prewar flier, having built both gliders and powered airplanes, and having earned pilot's license no. 229 just prior to start of the war. He volunteered his experience and his personal airplane to his country's military service. His experience and his valor made him both a mentor and leader of less experienced pilots, as Orlov rose to command the 7th Aviatsionniy Ostryad Istrebitelei (7th Fighter Aviation Detachment) of the Imperial Russian Air Service. After an exchange duty assignment to the Escadrille 3, Aéronautique Militaire, he wrote the first Russian text on aerial combat, Ways to Conduct an Air Combat. He was killed in action after scoring five confirmed aerial victories.

== Early life ==
Ivan Aleksandrovich Orlov was born into Russian nobility in Saint Petersburg on 19 January 1895. He attended the Imperial Alexandovsky Middle School. He developed an early interest in aviation after attending an air show. His generous allowance allowed him to indulge his obsession for flying. At first, he built gliders. Later, in 1913, he built a monoplane powered by a 35-horsepower Anzani engine, which he dubbed the "Orlov No. 1". He joined the All-Russian Aero Club and earned pilot's license No. 229 on 13 June 1914. At the time, he was studying law at Petrograd University.

== World War I ==
When World War I began, Orlov joined Russian military aviation as a Private. He submitted his enlistment application on 2 August 1914 and was accepted on the following day. He was posted to the 5th Corps Air Detachment, and brought his personal Farman S.7 to the new unit, which consisted of six Farman F.22 biplanes. The detachment was shipped off to serve in the Battle of Tannenberg under General Alexander Samsonov on 9 August. On 20 August 1914, Orlov flew a reconnaissance mission over Stalupepen, the first of 18 military sorties he would fly that month. His dash and courage flying these hazardous scouting missions in Voisins soon earned him both promotion and honors. After being decorated on 2 September, Orlov was promoted to Efreitor on 14 September. On 3 October, he was promoted again, to Feldwebel. Orlov moved to staff duty with the 5th Air Corps Detachment; on 21 November 1914, he was decorated for organizing communications with 2nd Army. He had not ceased flying however; on 18 November 1914, he was decorated for bombing a railroad. On 19 December, he was sent for advanced training on Voisins.

On 4 February 1915, he was commissioned as an officer; Northwestern Front Headquarters Order of the Day No. 474 appointed him a Praporschik for military merit. Having left a training stint at Petrograd Flying School, he was assigned to the First Army Aviation Detachment in February. He actually left Warsaw on 13 April in a Voisin to join the unit near Snyadovo. To his prior assignments of scouting and bombing, he now added aerial combat. He staked his first aerial victory claim on 26 May 1915, but it was unconfirmed.

On both 11 and 28 August 1915, Orlov flew hazardous reconnaissance under intense ground fire; he won medals for valor for both sorties. In September 1915, he was entrusted with picking up new aircraft from the factories in Petrograd and Moscow. He would not return to front line duty until October. On 30 November, he suffered an inflight concussion from an antiaircraft shell. Four days later, he was forwarded to the 7th Fighter Detachment in Galicia. On 4 December 1915, he was promoted to Podporuchik; on 10 December 1915, he moved to Odessa Flying School to undergo fighter conversion training there on Nieuports.

Orlov graduated from Nieuport training on 10 January 1916. His extreme courage impressed Grand Duke Alexander and General Vogel and spurred Orlov's appointment to command. Orlov was detailed to the Third Air Company to found and command the 7th Aviatsionniy Ostryad Istrebitelei (7th Fighter Aviation Detachment). On 18 March 1916, dedicated fighter units such as the 7th AOI were established by Order No. 300 of the Imperial Russian Army's Supreme Commander in Chief. On 12 April, the new unit received three two-seater Sikorsky S-16 fighters, with their trio of Lewis guns arriving two days later. Some Nieuport 9 and Nieuport 10 two-seater fighters arrived during April, as did Moska-Bystritsky MBbis serial number 2. Orlov made the new unit's first operational flight on 28 April.

Orlov scored his first two confirmed aerial victories in June 1916. On the 8th, he closed to 35 meters before shooting the enemy observer in the chest and downing the Austro-Hungarian craft. On the 25th, on his tenth sortie for the day, Orlov and Vasili Yanchenko wounded the aircrew with close-range fire and drove them and their aircraft down into captivity. The rest of the summer passed without results for Orlov.

On 16 September 1916, he led his unit to a new base near Vychulki Farm. From there, he scored another in October (sometimes reported as a victory on the Julian calendar date of 24 September). On 13 November, he was then posted on exchange duty to the Western Front to study French aerial tactics. He sailed on a weeks-long voyage from Murmansk to Brest to join the famous Stork Squadron, Escadrille 3. Here he trained with aces including Georges Guynemer and Alfred Heurtaux. On 24 January 1917, while flying a Spad VII with Escadrille 3, Orlov drove down an enemy aircraft north of Fresnoy for his fourth victory. He exited the dogfight by purposely spinning his aircraft to escape two enemy Halberstadt fighters.

At the end of January, Orlov was one of a party of six Russian pilots who returned home. He reached Petrograd on 20 March 1917. He checked in with his Air Fleet headquarters, submitted a report, and had a nine-page brochure on air tactics published by the Aviation and Aeronautics Field Department Bureau. Ways of Conducting an Air Combat principally encapsulated from tactical advice received from Guynemer and Heurteaux, and enumerated 16 main points. A key recommendation was the use of an induced spin to escape a losing situation, as he had done at Fresnoy.

Orlov returned to take up his duties with the 7th AOI in the wake of the February Revolution. The political turmoil in Russia was undermining the Russian military's combat capabilities; however, Orlov kept his unit in the fight. Their situation was summarized in a lamenting letter by Orlov: "We are stealing many parts from old aircraft to keep a few airworthy. Clearly we are tempting fate day after day." In April, he flew 13 combat missions from his unit's airfield near Markovtse. He used a Nieuport 11 to shoot down an Albatros two-seater on 21 May. By June, the 7th AOI had moved to Kozova, then on to Vikturovka; by now, it was reduced to six pilots and eight Nieuports. As his detachment flew intensive operations, Orlov personally flew 13 sorties in June. On the 20th, Orlov and Yanchenko tangled with two of a flight of five enemy planes; Orlov reported one of them as gliding down near Leśniki. On the 26th, he saved Yanchenko from a rear attack, driving off the attacker but being foiled of a victory by a blownout cartridge case jamming his gun. Then, on 4 July 1917, he unsuccessfully engaged attacking enemy fighters, using his new Nieuport 23, serial no. N2788. After combat maneuvering, the lower right wing of his Nieuport ripped loose, and Orlov fell 3,000 meters to his death in the Russian front line trenches near Kozova.

An aerial observer who had often flown with him, Ivan's brother Alexei Orlov, escorted his remains to burial in Tsarskoye Selo outside Petrograd.

== List of aerial victories ==
See also Aerial victory standards of World War I, List of World War I flying aces from the Russian Empire

Confirmed victories are numbered and listed chronologically.

No.	Date/time	Aircraft	Foe	Result	Location	Notes
u/c	26 May 1915	Voisin	Lloyd C.II	Shot down with machine gun	Near Novgorod	Victims from Flieger Abteilung 15; pilot Rosenbaum DOW, aerial observer Wittke WIA
1	8 June 1916	Moska-Bystritsky MBis serial no. 7	Lloyd C.II	Wounded pilot and observer; plane crashed behind Austro-Hungarian lines	Petlikovze	Victim from Austro-Hungarian Fliegerkompanie 9
2	25 June 1916	Nieuport 10 serial no. N205	Aviatik B.III serial no. 33.30	Forced landing, with pilot and observer wounded and captured	Pidhaitsi	Victim from Austro-Hungarian Fliegerkompanie 27; victory shared with Vasili Yanchenko
3	4 October 1916	Nieuport 21 serial no. N1514	Enemy aircraft	Set afire; fell behind enemy lines trailing heavy black smoke	Zlota-Lipca	Victory claim shared with Vasili Yanchenko
4	24 January 1917	Spad VII	Enemy aircraft	Forced down	Fresnoy, France	Scored while flying with French
5	21 May 1917	Nieuport 11 serial no. N1679	Albatros two-seater	Forced landing	Hill 829, south of Yasen	Victim from German Flieger-Abteilung (Artillerie) 242; air crew captured

== Honors and awards ==
- Cross of St. George, Fourth Class: Awarded prior to 3 October 1914
- Cross of St. George, Third Class: Awarded prior to 3 October 1914
- Cross of St. George, Second Class: Awarded prior to 3 October 1914
- Order of Saint Anne, Fourth Class: Awarded 4 April 1915
- Order of Saint Anne, Third Class
- Order of Saint George Fourth Class: Awarded 28 August 1915
- Order of Saint Stanislas Third Class with Crossed Swords and Bow: Awarded 30 August 1915
- Order of Saint Vladimir Fourth Class with Crossed Swords and Bow: 2 November 1915
- Gold Sword for Bravery
- French Croix de Guerre with palm
