= Vasili Yanchenko =

Ukrainian flying ace (1894–1959)

Vasili Ivanovich Yanchenko
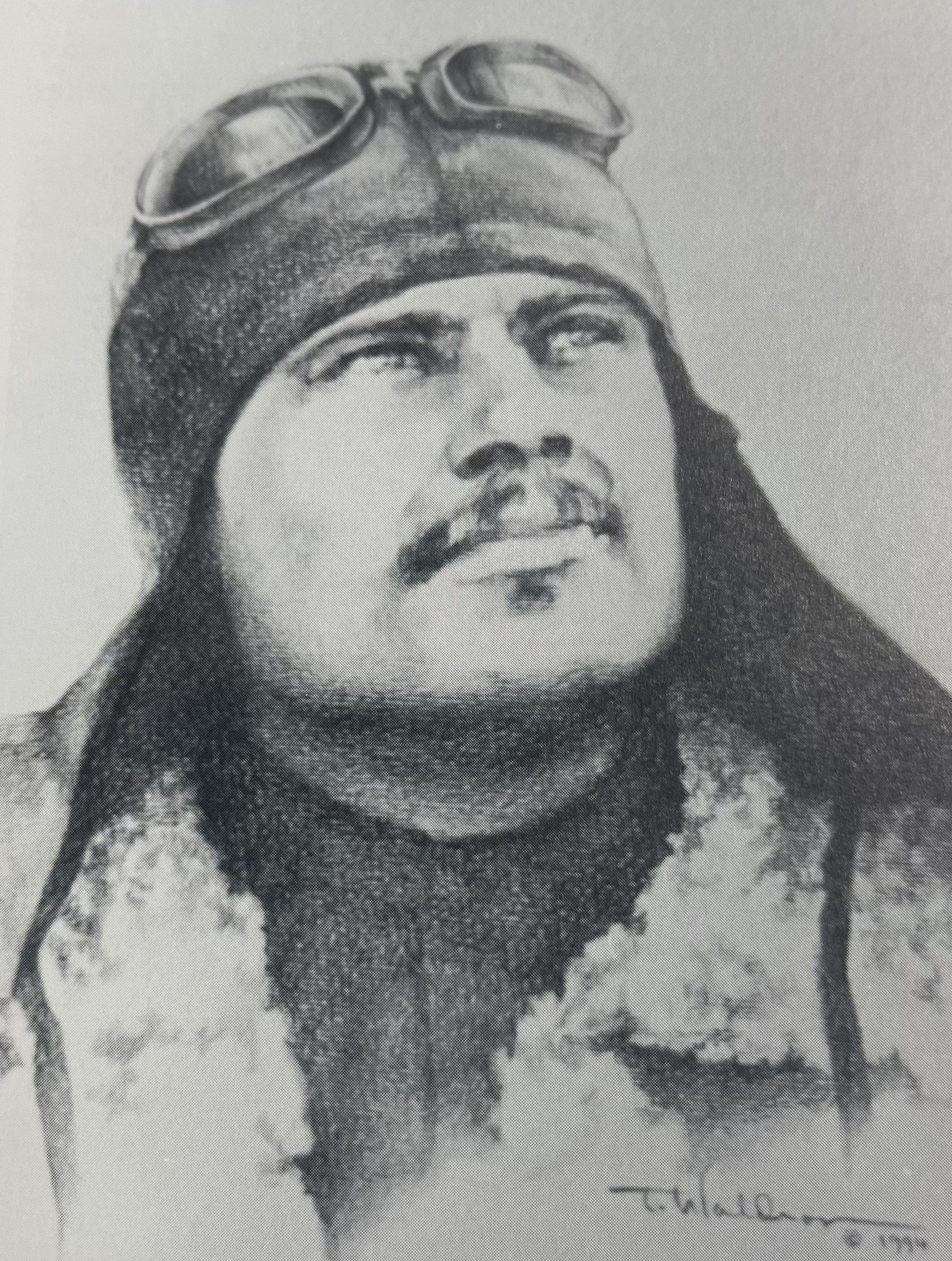
- Born: 1 January 1894; Nikolsk-Ussuriski Region
- Died: August 1959 (age 65); Dade County, Florida
- Military career
- Allegiance: Russian Empire
- Branch: Imperial Russian Air Service
- Service years: Imperial Russian Air Service: 1914–1917; Volunteer Army: 1918–1920
- Rank: Kapitan
- Units: Imperial Russian Air Service: Guards Aviation Detachment, 12th Korpusnoi Aviatsionniy Otryad (Corps Aviation Detachment), 7th Aviatsionniy Otryad Istrebitlei (Fighter Aviation Detachment), 32nd Korpusnoi Aviatsionniy Otryad (Corps Aviation Detachment); Russian Volunteer Army: 2nd Air Squadron
- Commands: 2nd Air Squadron
- Awards: Order of Saint George 4th Class, Cross of Saint George (all four classes), Order of Saint Vladimir Fourth Class, Order of Saint Anne Fourth Class, Romanian Order of the Star and Military Service Medal 2nd Class

Kapitan Vasili Ivanovich Yanchenko (1 January 1894 – August 1959) was a World War I flying ace credited with 16 aerial victories. He graduated his secondary education as a mechanical engineer in 1913, with an interest in aviation. He learned to fly shortly after graduation.

As his native Russia became embroiled in World War I, Yanchenko volunteered for military aviation duty on 22 November 1914. After being trained as a pilot the Imperial Russian Air Service way, he was posted to fly reconnaissance in combat on 4 September 1915. Undaunted by an onboard fire on his first combat mission, he continued to fly his missions despite burns.

Reassigned to fighters after additional training, he was sent to a unit commanded by an officer with whom he had a personality clash. His career as a fighter pilot did not take off until his reassignment to the prestigious 7th Fighter Aviation Detachment. He would score 13 aerial victories with the 7th, rise from the enlisted ranks to become an officer, and garner numerous decorations. He would also befriend fellow Russian aces Donat Makijonek, Juri Gilsher, and Ivan Orlov. After they became casualties, he transferred units. He would score three more victories in his new unit as the Russian Revolution sapped the will to fight from the IRAS. As a result, Yanchenko defected to the White Russian forces and fought the Bolsheviks from August 1918 to August 1920.

After the Volunteer Army's defeat, Yanchenko emigrated to the United States to forge a life's work as an engineer.

== Biography ==
Vasili Ivanovich Yanchenko was born 1 January 1894 in the Nikolsk-Ussuriski Region of the Russian Empire. He received his secondary education at the Saratov Technical School; he graduated early in 1913 as a mechanical engineer. He became interested in flying while still at school, and learned to fly soon after graduation.

He volunteered for the Imperial Russian Air Service on 22 November 1914, and was assigned to the Guards Aviation Detachment. On 10 February 1915, he began courses in general aviation subjects at the St. Petersburg Polytechnical Institute. On 16 April, he moved to begin pilot's training at the Military Flying School at Sevastopol. He soloed in a Morane-Saulnier L on 4 September 1915. The next day, he was posted to the 12th Korpusnoi Aviatsionniy Otryad (Corps Aviation Detachment) as a Starski Unter-Officer to fly reconnaissance missions. By the morning of 15 September, he was ready to take his first mission with his new unit. A few minutes into this maiden flight, Yanchenko's airplane engine exploded and started an inflight fuel fire. As he struggled to land the flaming machine within friendly lines, he mentioned to fan flames away from himself. However, he suffered second degree burns on the right side of his face, as well as his right arm. He also continued to fly his daily sorties despite his burns. He was awarded the Cross of Saint George for his calm courage.

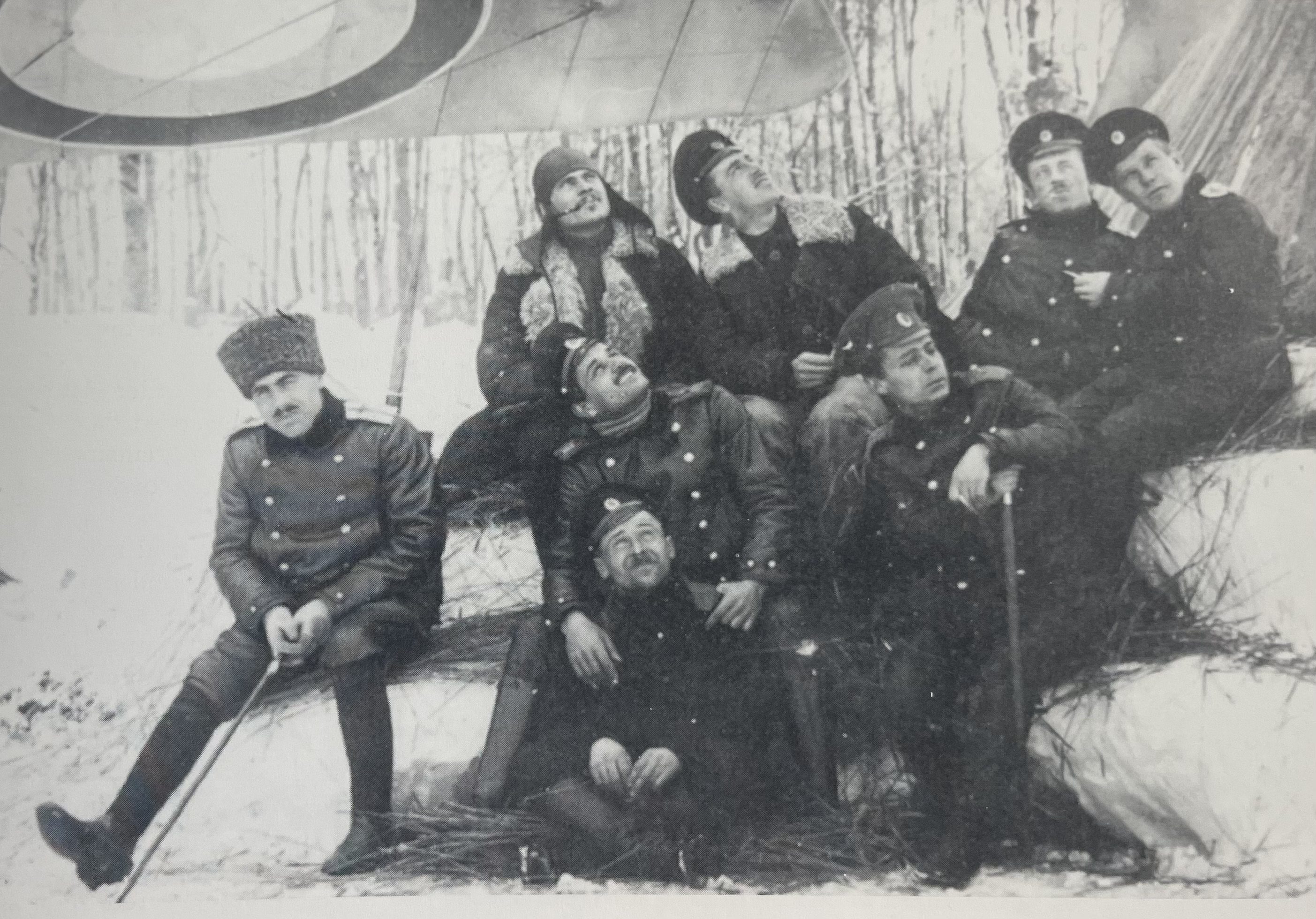
Vasili Yanchenko (back row, first from left) seen with members of the 12th Corps Detachment, ca. November 1915.

On 19 November 1915, he began advanced training on the Morane-Saulnier H fighter at the Moscow Air School. He graduated on 5 January 1916, and was assigned to the 3rd Korpusnoi Aviatsionniy Otryad (Corps Aviation Detachment) with a rank equivalent to sergeant major. His personality clashed with that of his new commander. As a result, he was demoted back to sergeant on 23 January 1916. By March, he had flown only ten missions. He applied for transfer to the forming 7th Aviatsionniy Otryad Istrebitlei (Fighter Aviation Detachment) in early March, and was posted to them on 7 April. His promotion was reinstated. By the end of May, he had flown almost 40 sorties with his new unit.

When he and Ivan Orlov shared a victory on 25 June 1916, Yanchenko showed that he had the audacity to close to pointblank range before opening fire at the enemy. Yanchenko's first aerial victory brought him the Second Class Cross of Saint George. He would fly 40 more missions before his second victory. In the meantime, he picked up two promotions in short order—to Podpraporshchik on 8 July, and then to full-fledged officer status on 21 August with a boost to Praporshik. The latter promotion was granted specifically in recognition of his valor.

He also split his second win with Orlov, on 4 October, but scored on his own on the 18th. it was at about this time that Yanchenko's commanding officer, Orlov, recommended Yanchenko for training on fighter aircraft. The recommendation noted that he oversaw maintenance on the unit's machines. The end of 1916 saw his departure on furloughs; consequently, he spent little time in combat during this period.

Yanchenko was awarded the Order of Saint Vladimir on 3 January 1917, in recognition of an unsuccessful air fight on 2 October 1916. The award came with ten days mandatory leave. A subsequent landing accident in Nieuport 9 s/n 285 destroyed the machine and injured Yanchenko. During his recovery, he became friends with Donat Makijonek; the two of them especially enjoyed discussing aerial warfare and its tactics. After Yanchenko's recovery in late February 1917, the pair began flying together. On 7 March 1917, they teamed up to down an enemy two-seater, attacking it eight times.

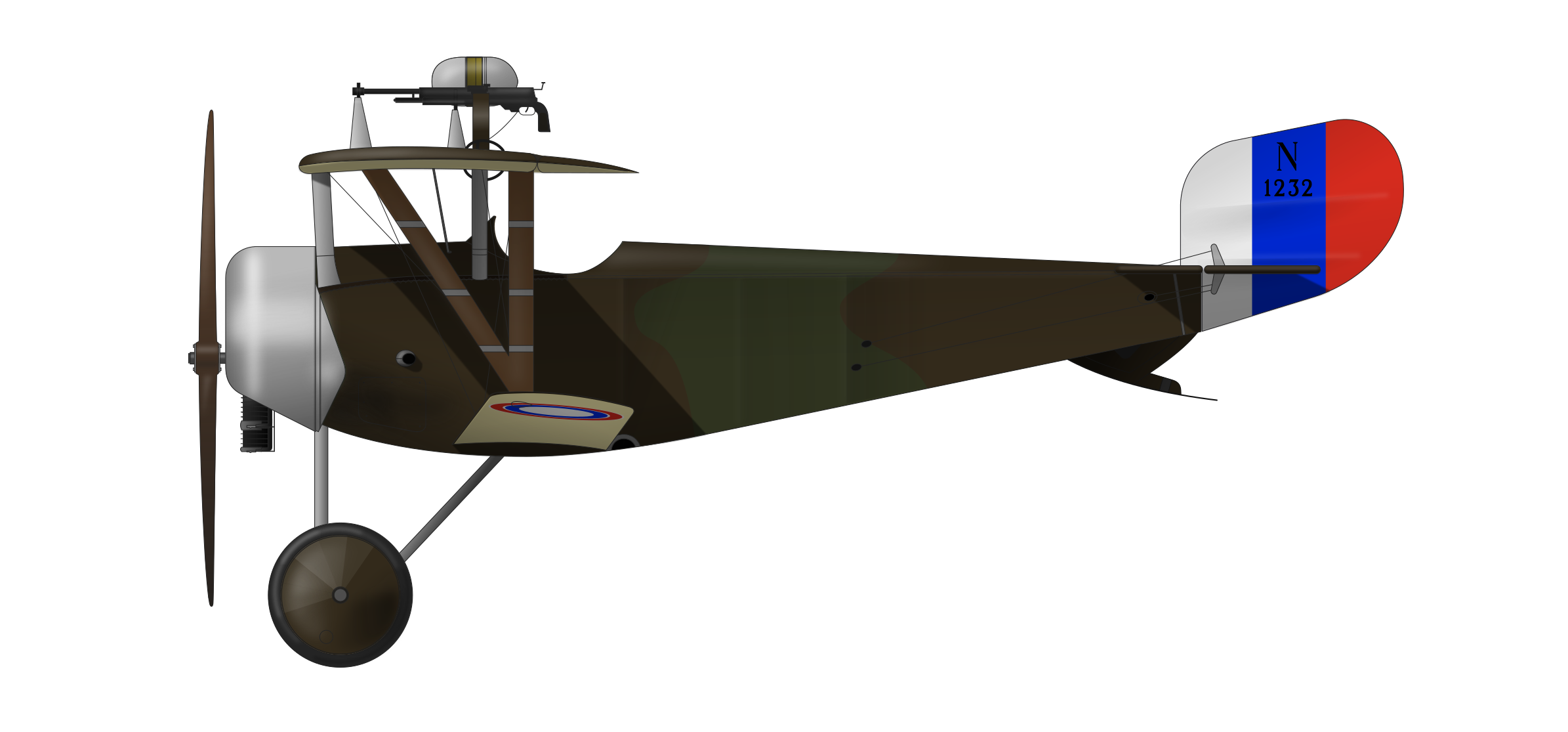
Vasili Yanchenko's Nieuport 11, spring 1917.

On 13 April, Yanchenko would use a Morane-Saulnier H to share a couple of victories with Makijonek and Juri Gilsher. A week later, Yanchenko was brought down by artillery fire inside the Russian lines; his Morane-Saulnier H was ruined, but he suffered only a slight leg wound. Despite this, he went on to fly 84 sorties over the next two months, though with only one victory. He used a Nieuport 17 for that seventh win on 27 June 1917.

By now, Yanchenko's unit, the 7th AOI, was heavily involved in supporting the Brusilov Offensive. On 4 July 1917, his friend and commanding officer Ivan Orlov was killed in action. Yanchenko's other friend, Juri Gilsher, succeeded to the command, only to be killed on 20 July. Yanchenko and Makijonek were with him when he fell in a battle against 16 enemy airplanes. Yanchenko disengaged from the clump of Germans attacking him by faking an out-of-control spin, and landed near the wreckage. He removed Gilsher's body from the smashed plane, and forwarded it to Tarnopol as a last service for his friend. He also wrote Gilsher's father, giving details of the loss.

Yanchenko and Makijonek attacked and downed an enemy plane on 5 August 1917. However, Makijonek was severely wounded in the fight; he was medically evacuated. Yanchenko was left as the 7th's only ace. Bereft of his friends and fellow warriors, he was depressed and solemn.

He transferred to the 32nd Korpusnoi Aviatsionniy Otryad (Corps Aviation Detachment) 20 September 1917, and used Nieuport 23 s/n N3374 for his last three victories. His final victory came on 14 October 1917. By then the effects of the October Revolution were being felt in the 32nd, and operations dwindled to a halt by month's end because of Bolshevik influence on the military. As the Soldiers Committees began to advocate violence against their officers, Vasili Yanchenko fled the 32nd KAO in November 1917.

It took him until early 1918 for him to reach Novocherkassk and the Volunteer Army of the White Movement. Once there, he was granted command of their Second Air Squadron in August 1918; he would lead the squadron during the Russian Civil War for the next two years. He would be recommended for the Order of Saint Nicholas Thaumaturge for his courage in battle on 20 June 1920. By August 1920, he had risen to the rank of Kapitan. He evacuated Russia with the White Russians shortly thereafter. Having scored 11 of his victories flying the Nieuport 11, he was the most successful pilot in the type.

After the White Russian defeat, Yanchenko found his way to the United States during the 1920s. He became an American citizen in the late 1920s. He worked a short while for Igor Sikorsky as an engineer. That developed into a career as a design engineer in Syracuse, New York during the 1930s. He retired from that work in 1952. He died in Dade County, Florida in August 1959.

== List of aerial victories ==
See also Aerial victory standards of World War I, List of World War I flying aces from the Russian Empire

Confirmed victories are numbered and listed chronologically.

No.	Date/time	Aircraft	Foe	Result	Location	Notes
1	25 June 1916	Nieuport 11	Aviatik B.I serial number 33.30	Crashed on its side near Russian troops	Pidhaitsi	Victory shared with Ivan Orlov; aircrew from Austro-Hungarian Fliegerkompanie 27 wounded in action
2	5 October 1916	Nieuport 11	Enemy two-seater	Down in smoke and flames	Along the Zolota Lypa River	Victory shared with Ivan Orlov
3	18 October 1916 @ 1605 hours	Nieuport 11	Enemy aircraft	Crashlanded near Russian troops	Lipitsa	
4	7 March 1917	Nieuport 11 s/n N1889	Albatros two-seater		West of Lipitsa-Gurna	Victory shared with Donat Makijonek
5	13 April 1917 @ 0845 hours	Morane-Saulnier	Hansa-Brandenburg C.I s/n 67.03		Bohorodchany	Victory shared with Makijonek and Juri Gilsher; victim from Austro-Hungarian Fliegerkompanie 7
6	13 April 1917 @ 1525 hours	Morane-Saulnier	Hansa-Brandenburg C.I s/n 6704	Fell into woods trailing black smoke	Posech	Victory shared with Makijonek and Gilsher; victim from Austro-Hungarian Fliegerkompanie 7
u/c	25 June 1917	Nieuport 10 s/n N1302	Enemy two-seater	Driven down out of control	Vicinity of Pidhaitsi	
7	27 June 1917	Nieuport 17	Enemy aircraft		Shumlany	
8	2 July 1917	Nieuport 11 s/n 1889	Hansa-Brandenburg C.I s/n 27.44		Vicinity of Berezhany	
9	6 July 1917	Nieuport 11 s/n 1889	Enemy aircraft		North of Berezhany	Victory shared with Makijonek
10	11 July 1917	Nieuport 11 s/n 1889	Enemy aircraft		Berezhany	Victory shared with Makijonek
11	18 July 1917	Nieuport 11 s/n 1889	Enemy aircraft		Berezhany	
12	20 July 1917 @ 2030 hours	Nieuport 11 s/n 1889	Enemy two-seater		Tarnopol	Victory shared with Gilsher
13	5 August 1917	Nieuport 11	Enemy two-seater	Crashed	Berezhany	Victory shared with Makijonek
14	23 September 1917 @ 1120 hours	Nieuport 11	Albatros D.III	Crashed	Husiatyn	
15	8 October 1917	Nieuport 21	Aviatik C	Crashed	Zbrizh area	
16	14 October 1917	Nieuport 21	Albatros D.III	Crashed; pilot KIA	Gorodik	Victim from Austro-Hungarian Fliegerkompanie 30

== Honors and awards ==
- Order of Saint George Fourth Class
- Order of Saint Vladimir Fourth Class with Sword and Ribbon: Awarded 3 January 1917 per Order 2028 of the Southwestern Front Armies
- Order of Saint Anna Fourth Class inscribed "For Bravery": Awarded 8 October 1916 per Order 1273 of the 7th Army
- Cross of Saint George Fourth Class: Awarded 20 September 1915
- Cross of Saint George Third Class: Awarded early November 1915 per 12th Order 477 of the Army Corps
- Cross of Saint George Second Class number 10528: Awarded 21 July 1916
- Cross of Saint George First Class no. 11362: Awarded 21 July 1916
- Order of the Star of Romania
- Romanian Military Medal Second Class
- Military Pilot: Awarded 10 October 1916 per Order 1328 of the Supreme Chief Commander
