= 16th Reserve Division =

16th Reserve Division (16. Reserve-Division)
- Active: 1914-1919
- Country: Germany
- Branch: Army
- Type: Infantry
- Size: Approx. 15,000
- Engagements: World War I: Great Retreat, First Battle of the Marne, Second Battle of Champagne, Battle of the Somme, Second Battle of the Aisne, Kerensky offensive, German spring offensive

The 16th Reserve Division (16. Reserve-Division) was a unit of the Imperial German Army in World War I. The division was formed on mobilization of the German Army in August 1914 as part of VIII Reserve Corps. The division was disbanded in 1919 during the demobilization of the German Army after World War I. The division was recruited primarily in the Prussian Rhine Province. At the beginning of the war, it formed the VIII Reserve Corps with the 15th Reserve Division.

== Combat chronicle ==
The 16th Reserve Division fought on the Western Front, participating in the opening German offensive which led to the Allied Great Retreat, fighting at Sedan in late August 1914. It fought in the First Battle of the Marne. Thereafter, it remained in the line in the Champagne region and fought in the Second Battle of Champagne in September–October 1915. It fought on the Aisne until October 1916, and then joined the Battle of the Somme. Its next major engagement was the Second Battle of the Aisne, also called the Third Battle of Champagne (and by the Germans, the Double Battle on the Aisne and in the Champagne). In July 1917, the division was transferred to the Eastern Front for the counter-attack during the Kerensky offensive. It remained on the Eastern Front until November 1917, and then returned to the Western Front. The division fought in the 1918 German spring offensive, and remained in the Flanders and Artois regions until the end of the war. Allied intelligence rated the division as second class in 1918.

== Order of battle on mobilization ==
The order of battle of the 16th Reserve Division on mobilization was as follows:

- 29. Reserve-Infanterie-Brigade
  - Reserve-Infanterie-Regiment Nr. 29
  - Reserve-Infanterie-Regiment Nr. 65
- 31. Reserve-Infanterie-Brigade
  - Reserve-Infanterie-Regiment Nr. 28
  - Reserve-Infanterie-Regiment Nr. 68
- Schweres Reserve-Reiter-Regiment Nr. 2
- Reserve-Feldartillerie-Regiment Nr. 16
- 1.Reserve-Kompanie/1. Rheinisches Pionier-Bataillon Nr. 8
- 2.Reserve-Kompanie/1. Rheinisches Pionier-Bataillon Nr. 8

== Order of battle on April 10, 1918 ==
The 16th Reserve Division was triangularized in late September 1916. Over the course of the war, other changes took place, including the formation of artillery and signals commands and a pioneer battalion. The order of battle on April 10, 1918, was as follows:

- 31. Reserve-Infanterie-Brigade
  - Reserve-Infanterie-Regiment Nr. 29
  - Reserve-Infanterie-Regiment Nr. 30
  - Reserve-Infanterie-Regiment Nr. 68
- 4.Eskadron/Kürassier-Regiment Graf Geßler (Rheinisches) Nr. 8
- Artillerie-Kommandeur 106
  - Reserve-Feldartillerie-Regiment Nr. 16
  - Fußartillerie-Bataillon Nr. 127
- Pionier-Bataillon Nr. 316
- Divisions-Nachrichten-Kommandeur 416
