= VIII Reserve Corps =

VIII Reserve Corps VIII. Reserve-Korps
- Flag of the Staff of a Generalkommando (1871–1918)
- Active: 2 August 1914 - post November 1918
- Country: German Empire
- Type: Corps
- Size: Approximately 38,000 (on formation)
- Engagements: World War I Battle of the Frontiers

Insignia
- Abbreviation: VIII RK

The VIII Reserve Corps (German: VIII. Reserve-Korps / VIII RK) was a corps level command of the German Army in World War I.

== Formation ==
VIII Reserve Corps was formed on the outbreak of the war in August 1914 as part of the mobilisation of the Army. It was initially commanded by General der Infanterie Wilhelm Freiherr von Egloffstein. It was still in existence at the end of the war in the 7th Army, Heeresgruppe Deutscher Kronprinz on the Western Front.

=== Structure on formation ===
On formation in August 1914, VIII Reserve Corps consisted of two divisions, made up of reserve units. In general, Reserve Corps and Reserve Divisions were weaker than their active counterparts

Reserve Infantry Regiments did not always have three battalions nor necessarily contain a machine gun company
Reserve Jäger Battalions did not have a machine gun company on formation
Reserve Cavalry Regiments consisted of just three squadrons
Reserve Field Artillery Regiments usually consisted of two abteilungen of three batteries each
Corps Troops generally consisted of a Telephone Detachment and four sections of munition columns and trains

In summary, VIII Reserve Corps mobilised with 21 infantry battalions, 4 machine gun companies (24 machine guns), 6 cavalry squadrons, 12 field artillery batteries (72 guns) and 3 pioneer companies.

Corps	Division	Brigade	Units
VIII Reserve Corps	15th Reserve Division	30th Reserve Infantry Brigade	25th Reserve Infantry Regiment
VIII Reserve Corps	15th Reserve Division	30th Reserve Infantry Brigade	69th Reserve Infantry Regiment
VIII Reserve Corps	15th Reserve Division	32nd Reserve Infantry Brigade	17th Reserve Infantry Regiment
VIII Reserve Corps	15th Reserve Division	32nd Reserve Infantry Brigade	30th Reserve Infantry Regiment
VIII Reserve Corps	15th Reserve Division		5th Reserve Uhlan Regiment
VIII Reserve Corps	15th Reserve Division		15th Reserve Field Artillery Regiment
VIII Reserve Corps	15th Reserve Division		4th Company, 8th Pioneer Battalion
VIII Reserve Corps	15th Reserve Division		15th Reserve Divisional Pontoon Train
VIII Reserve Corps	15th Reserve Division		8th Reserve Medical Company
VIII Reserve Corps	16th Reserve Division	29th Reserve Infantry Brigade	29th Reserve Infantry Regiment
VIII Reserve Corps	16th Reserve Division	29th Reserve Infantry Brigade	65th Reserve Infantry Regiment
VIII Reserve Corps	16th Reserve Division	31st Reserve Infantry Brigade	28th Reserve Infantry Regiment
VIII Reserve Corps	16th Reserve Division	31st Reserve Infantry Brigade	68th Reserve Infantry Regiment
VIII Reserve Corps	16th Reserve Division		2nd Reserve Schwere Reiter Regiment
VIII Reserve Corps	16th Reserve Division		16th Reserve Field Artillery Regiment
VIII Reserve Corps	16th Reserve Division		1st Reserve Company, 8th Pioneer Battalion
VIII Reserve Corps	16th Reserve Division		2nd Reserve Company, 8th Pioneer Battalion
VIII Reserve Corps	16th Reserve Division		12th Reserve Medical Company
VIII Reserve Corps	Corps Troops		8th Reserve Telephone Detachment
VIII Reserve Corps	Corps Troops		Munition Trains and Columns corresponding to the III Reserve Corps

== Combat chronicle ==
On mobilisation, VIII Reserve Corps was assigned to the 4th Army forming part of the centre of the forces for the Schlieffen Plan offensive in August 1914.

== Commanders ==
VIII Reserve Corps had the following commanders during its existence:

From	Rank	Name
2 August 1914	General der Infanterie	Wilhelm Freiherr von Egloffstein
2 January 1915	Generalleutnant	Paul Fleck
7 September 1916	Generalleutnant	Georg Wichura
22 March 1917	General der Infanterie	Georg Wichura

== See also ==
- German Army order of battle (1914)
- German Army order of battle, Western Front (1918)

== Bibliography ==
- Cron, Hermann (2002). Imperial German Army 1914-18: Organisation, Structure, Orders-of-Battle [first published: 1937]. Helion & Co. ISBN 1-874622-70-1.
- Ellis, John; Cox, Michael (1993). The World War I Databook. Aurum Press Ltd. ISBN 1-85410-766-6.
- Histories of Two Hundred and Fifty-One Divisions of the German Army which Participated in the War (1914-1918), compiled from records of Intelligence section of the General Staff, American Expeditionary Forces, at General Headquarters, Chaumont, France 1919. The London Stamp Exchange Ltd. 1989 [1920]. ISBN 0-948130-87-3.
- The German Forces in the Field; 7th Revision, 11th November 1918; Compiled by the General Staff, War Office. Imperial War Museum, London and the Battery Press. 1995 [1918]. ISBN 978-1-870423-95-3.
