= 15th Reserve Division =

15th Reserve Division (15. Reserve-Division)
- Active: 1914-1919
- Country: Germany
- Branch: Army
- Type: Infantry
- Size: Approx. 15,000
- Engagements: World War I: Great Retreat, First Battle of the Marne, Second Battle of Champagne, Battle of the Somme, Battle of Arras (1917), Kerensky Offensive

The 15th Reserve Division (15. Reserve-Division) was a unit of the Prussian Army within the Imperial German Army in World War I. The division was formed on mobilization of the German Army in August 1914 as part of VIII Reserve Corps. The division was disbanded in 1919 during the demobilization of the German Army after World War I. The division was recruited primarily in the Prussian Rhine Province. At the beginning of the war, it formed the VIII Reserve Corps with the 16th Reserve Division.

== Combat chronicle ==
The 15th Reserve Division fought on the Western Front, participating in the opening German offensive which led to the Allied Great Retreat, fighting at Sedan in late August 1914. It fought in the First Battle of the Marne. Thereafter, it remained in the line in the Champagne region and fought in the Second Battle of Champagne in September–October 1915. It fought on the Aisne until September 1916, and then joined the Battle of the Somme. Its next major engagement was the Battle of Arras in the Spring of 1917. In May 1917, the division was transferred to the Eastern Front, where it resisted the Russian Summer Offensive known as the Kerensky Offensive. It remained on the Eastern Front until the armistice on that front, and then returned to the Western Front, arriving in the Verdun region at the beginning of January 1918. It went to the Flanders/Artois region in April 1918 and remained in that general area until the end of the war. Allied intelligence rated the division as third class.

== Order of battle on mobilization ==
The order of battle of the 15th Reserve Division on mobilization was as follows:

- 30. Reserve-Infanterie-Brigade
  - Reserve-Infanterie-Regiment Nr. 25
  - Reserve-Infanterie-Regiment Nr. 69
- 32. Reserve-Infanterie-Brigade
  - Reserve-Infanterie-Regiment Nr. 17
  - Reserve-Infanterie-Regiment Nr. 30
- Reserve-Ulanen-Regiment Nr. 5
- Reserve-Feldartillerie-Regiment Nr. 15
- 4.Kompanie/1. Rheinisches Pionier-Bataillon Nr. 8

== Order of battle on January 1, 1918 ==
The 15th Reserve Division was triangularized in late September 1916. Over the course of the war, other changes took place, including the formation of artillery and signals commands and a pioneer battalion. The order of battle on January 1, 1918, was as follows:

- 30. Reserve-Infanterie-Brigade
  - Reserve-Infanterie-Regiment Nr. 25
  - Reserve-Infanterie-Regiment Nr. 17
  - Reserve-Infanterie-Regiment Nr. 69
- 2. Eskadron/Kürassier-Regiment Graf Gessler (Rheinisches) Nr. 8
- Artillerie-Kommandeur 104
  - Reserve-Feldartillerie-Regiment Nr. 15
- Stab Pionier-Bataillon Nr. 315
  - 4.Kompanie/1. Rheinisches Pionier-Bataillon Nr. 8
  - 6.Kompanie/1. Rheinisches Pionier-Bataillon Nr. 8
  - Minenwerfer-Kompanie Nr. 215
- Divisions-Nachrichten-Kommandeur 415
