= Fresnoy =

- Commune
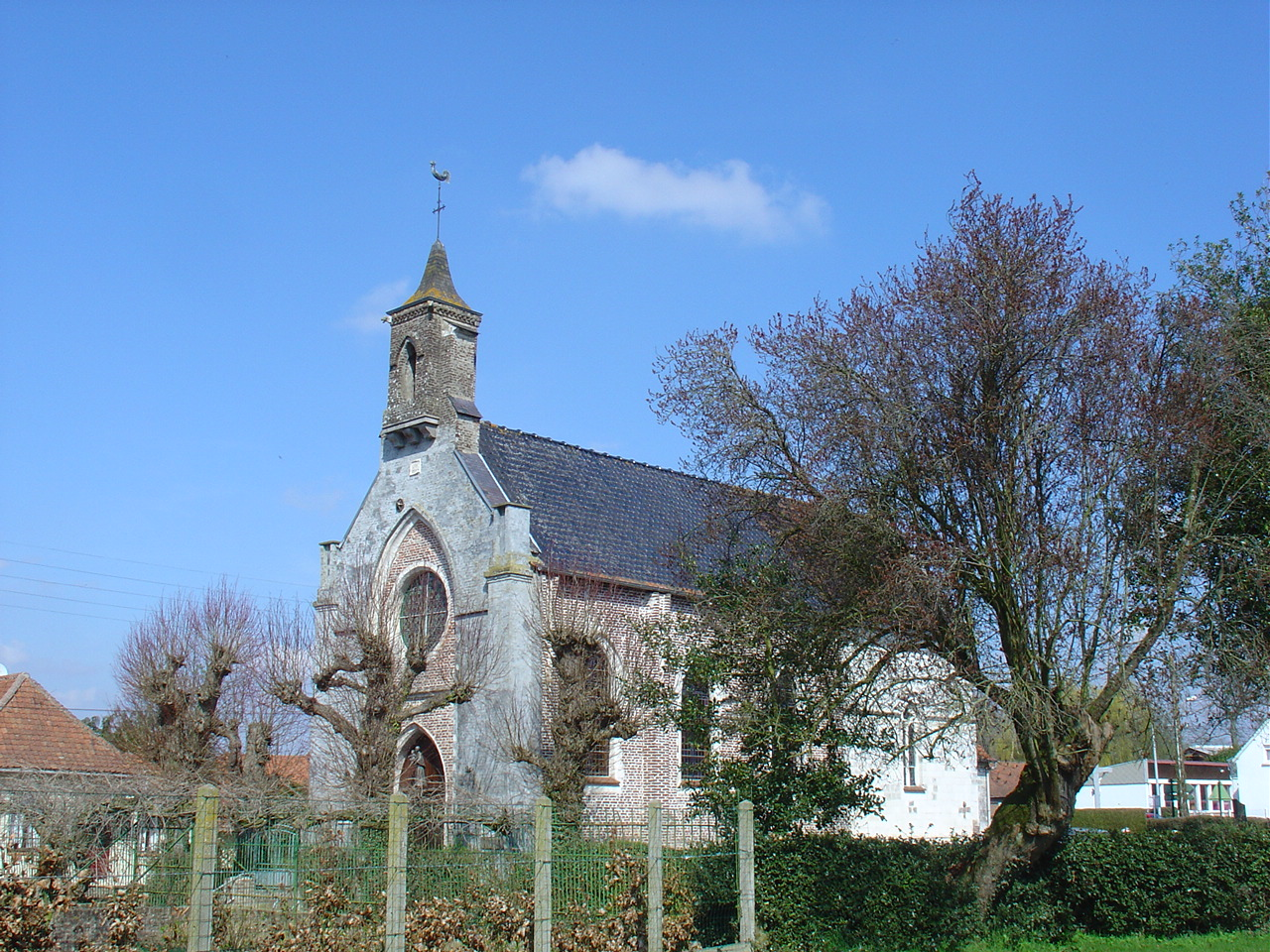
- The church of Fresnoy

- Coat of arms
- Location of Fresnoy
- Location within France Location within Hauts-de-France
- Coordinates: 50°22′06″N 2°07′50″E
- Country: France
- Region: Hauts-de-France
- Department: Pas-de-Calais
- Arrondissement: Montreuil
- Canton: Auxi-le-Château
- Intercommunality: CC des 7 Vallées

Government
  - Mayor (2020–2026): Philippe Decobert
- Area^{1}: 2.4 km^{2} (0.93 sq mi)
- Elevation: 103 m (338 ft)
- Highest elevation: 119 m (390 ft)
- Lowest elevation: 65 m (213 ft)
- Population (2023): 62
  - Density: 26/km^{2} (67/sq mi)
- Time zone: UTC+01:00 (CET)
  - Summer (DST): UTC+02:00 (CEST)
- INSEE/Postal code: 62357 /62770
- ^{1} French Land Register data, which excludes lakes, ponds, glaciers > 1 km^{2} (0.386 sq mi or 247 acres) and river estuaries.

Fresnoy (French pronunciation: [fʁɛnwa]) is a commune in the Pas-de-Calais department in the Hauts-de-France region of France.

== Geography ==
A tiny village situated some 20 miles (32 km) southeast of Montreuil-sur-Mer on the D109 road.

== Population ==
Historical population
Year	Pop.	±% p.a.
1968	91	—
1975	85	−0.97%
1982	71	−2.54%
1990	58	−2.50%
1999	67	+1.62%
2007	74	+1.25%
2012	66	−2.26%
2017	69	+0.89%
2023	62	−1.77%
Source: INSEE

== Places of interest ==
- Church of St. Éloi, dating from the sixteenth century.

== See also ==
- Communes of the Pas-de-Calais department
