= Aviatik B.III =

B.III
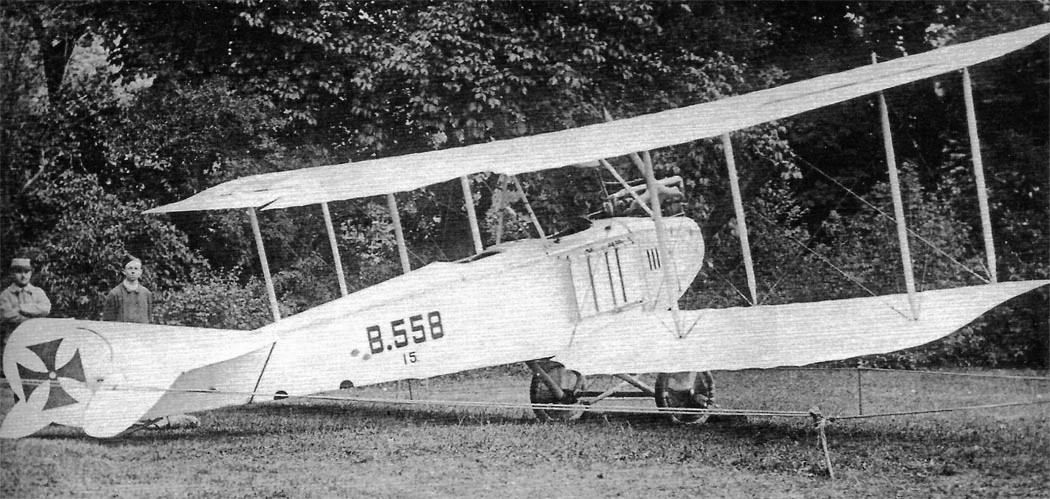

General information
- Type: Reconnaissance aircraft
- Manufacturer: Öesterreichesche-Ungärische Flugzeugfabrik Aviatik
- Designer: Robert Wild
- Primary user: Kaiserliche und Konigliche Luftfahrtruppen

History
- Introduction date: 1916
- First flight: 1916
- Retired: 1916

The Aviatik B.III was a reconnaissance aircraft built in Austria-Hungary during World War I. Aviatik's Austro-Hungarian subsidiary had built the German-designed B.II, and now further developed this design by adding a more powerful engine and armament in the form of a defensive machine gun and bomb racks. It was otherwise similar to Austro-Hungarian built B.IIs, incorporating the revisions that had been made locally to the original design. All were obsolete and out of service by the end of 1916.

== Operators ==
Austria-Hungary

- Austro-Hungarian Imperial and Royal Aviation Troops

== Specifications ==
General characteristics

- Crew: two, pilot and observer
- Powerplant: 1 × Austro-Daimler inline , 120 kW (160 hp)

Performance Armament

- 1 × 8mm Schwarzlose MG M.07/12 machine gun for observer
- Several 10 kg (22 lb) bombs
