= Nieuport 21 =

French WW1 Nieuport fighter aircraft

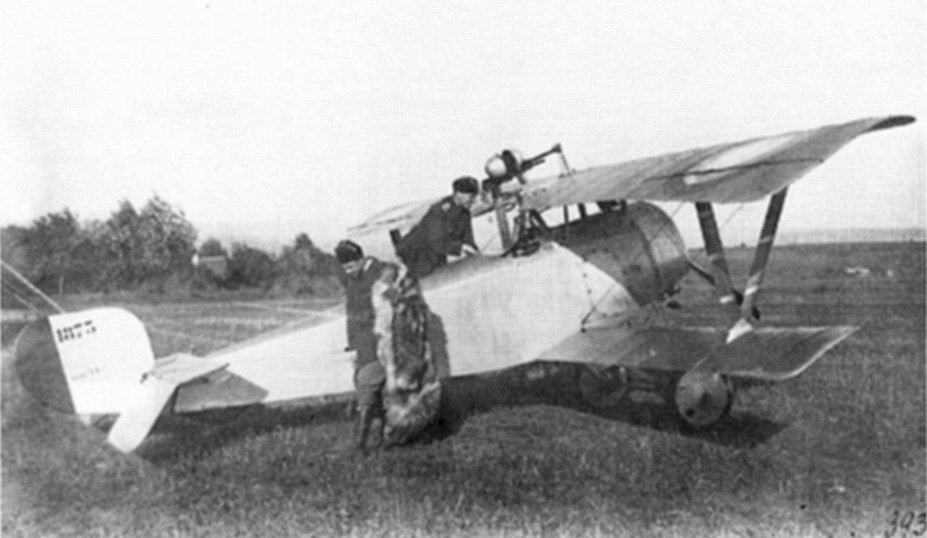
- A Nieuport 21 of the Imperial Russian Air Service

General information
- Type: Fighter
- Manufacturer: Nieuport
- Designer: Gustave Delage
- Primary users: Aéronautique Militaire Imperial Russian Air Service; US Army Air Service

History
- Introduction date: 1 August 1916
- First flight: June 1916
- Retired: 1920s
- Developed from: Nieuport 17

The Nieuport 21 (or Nieuport XXI C.1 in contemporary sources) was a French single-seat, single-engine fighter aircraft used during World War I. The aircraft was used by the French, Russian, British and American air forces. After the war, the Nieuport 21 was a popular civil aircraft.

== Design and development ==
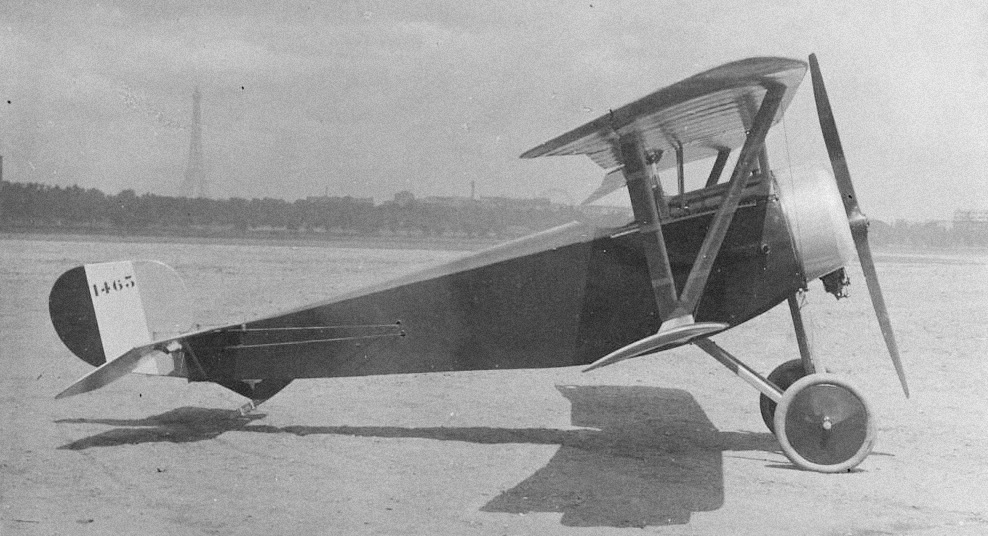
Nieuport 21 prototype

The Nieuport 21 was designed by Gustave Delage and it made its maiden flight in 1916. While it had a similar airframe to the Nieuport 17, it was equipped with a less powerful Le Rhône 9C engine as it was originally intended as a long range escort fighter. As the engine was fitted with a horseshoe shaped cowling, the Nieuport 21 was often mistaken for the slightly smaller Nieuport 11, which used the same cowling.

== Operational history ==
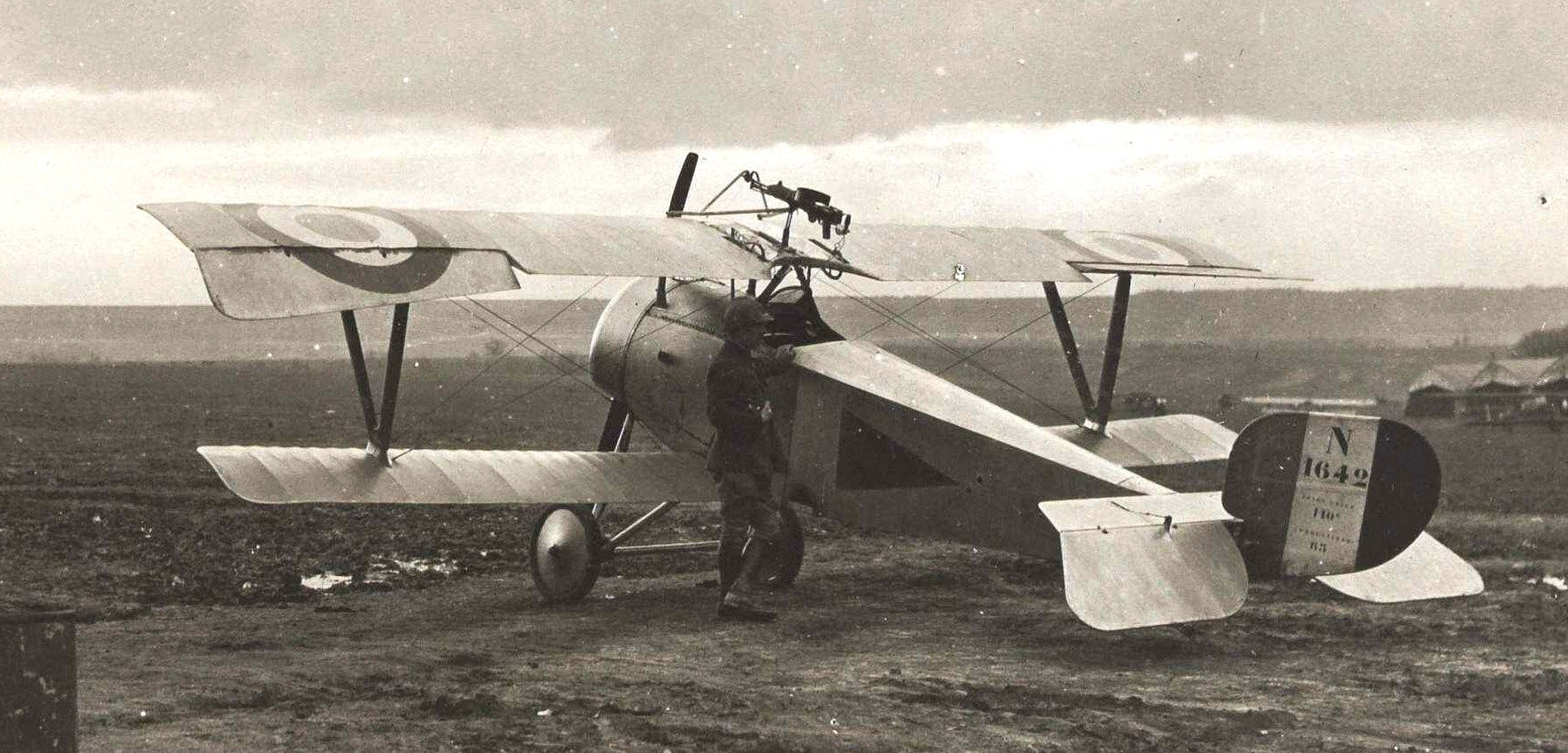
French Nieuport 21 fighter at Lemmes aerodrome in late 1916

The Nieuport 21 served alongside the more powerful Nieuport 17, where its lower weight helped boost its already impressive climb rate. Although initially intended as a bomber escort, this role was abandoned when the bombers were withdrawn from daylight operations. Large numbers were also built for training duties. Nieuport 21s were sold to Russia, and to the United States for use as trainers. The Nieuport 21 was license manufactured in Russia by Dux Factory. Examples were also used in limited numbers by the Royal Naval Air Service. A small number were used by a number of air arms in the early post war period, including the Finnish Air Force (the Whites) which had captured a Russian aircraft in Tampere in 1918 and which was used until 1923. The French Navy used one example for carrier trials in 1919 and 1920. Due to its similarity to the Nieuport 11, many operated by air forces post-war have been misidentified in the past as Nieuport 11s, few of which survived that long.

== Operators ==
Argentina

- Argentine Navy

Brazil

- Brazilian Air Force

Estonia

- Estonian Air Force - Postwar

France

- Armee de l'Air
- French Navy

Finland

- Finnish Air Force

Finnish Socialist Workers' Republic

- Red Guards (ex-Russian examples)

Netherlands

- Luchtvaartafdeling - operated 5 Nieuport 21s as 80 HP Nieuports.

Portugal
Portuguese Air Force
Romania

- Romanian Air Corps

Russian Empire

- Imperial Russian Air Service

Serbia

Soviet Russia

- Soviet Air Forces operated ex-Imperial Russian Air Service.

Thailand

- Royal Thai Air Force

Ukrainian People's Republic

- Ukrainian People's Republic Air Fleet

United Kingdom

- Royal Naval Air Service
  - Five aircraft only.

United States

- United States Army Air Service

== Specifications ==
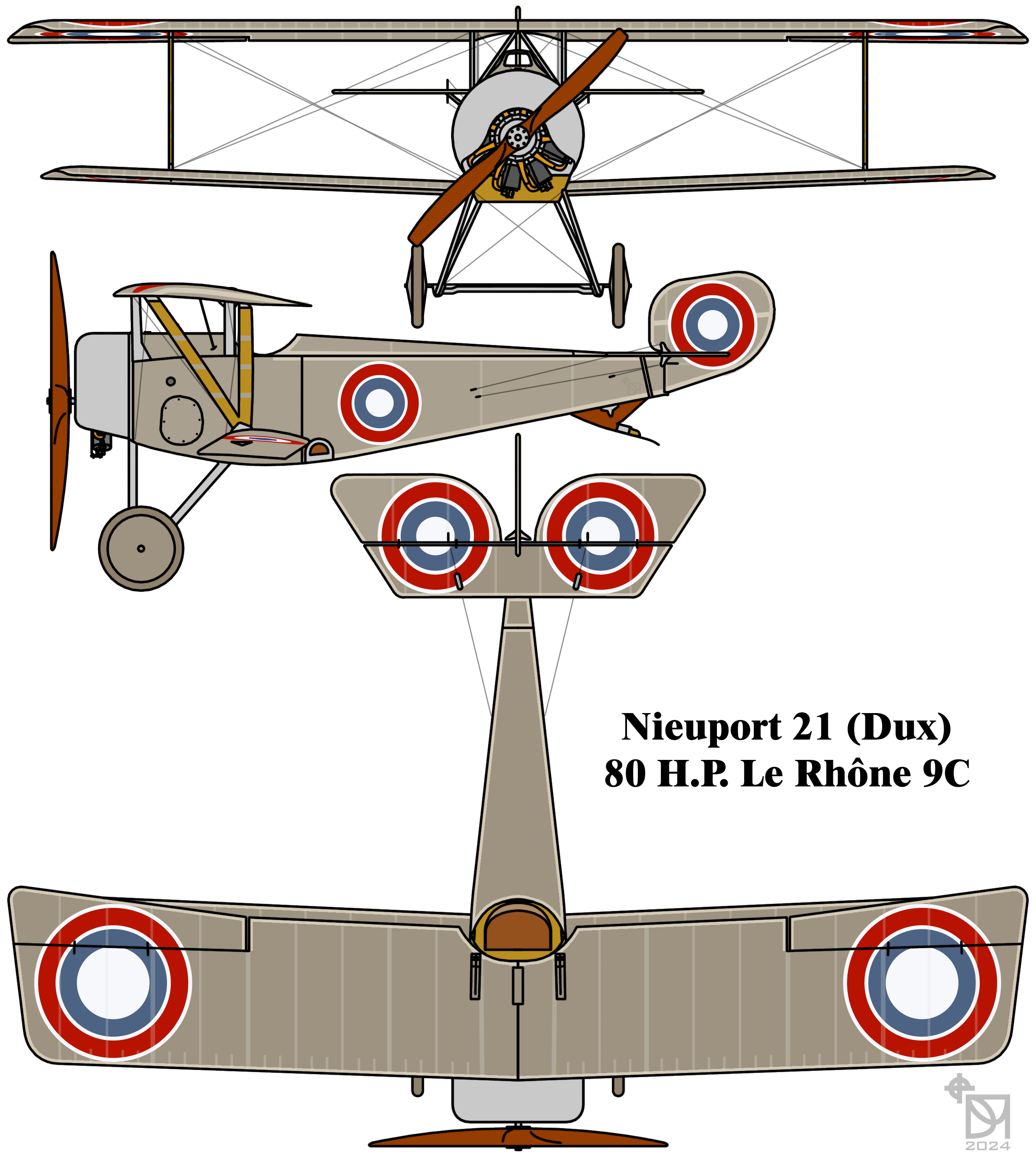
Nieuport 21

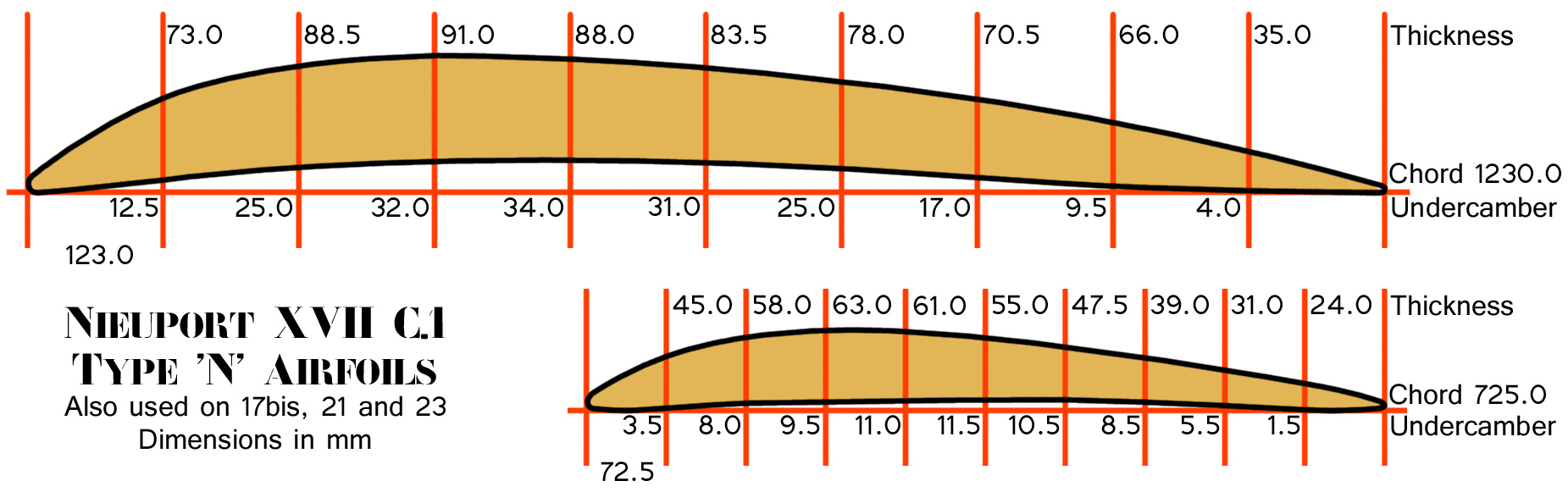
Nieuport Type N airfoil drawings

Data from French Aircraft of the First World War and Nieuport 1875-1911

General characteristics

- Crew: 1
- Length: 5.80 m (19 ft 0 in)
- Upper wingspan: 8.16 m (26 ft 9 in)
- Upper Chord: 1.233 m (4 ft 0.5 in)
- Wing Sweep: 3° 20'
- Lower wingspan: 7.80 m (25 ft 7 in)
- Lower Chord: 720 m (2,360 ft)
- Height: 2.40 m (7 ft 10 in)
- Wing area: 14.75 m^{2} (158.8 sq ft)
- Airfoil: N
- Empty weight: 350 kg (772 lb)
- Gross weight: 530 kg (1,168 lb)
- Undercarriage track: 1.60 m (5 ft 3 in)
- Powerplant: 1 × Le Rhône 9C air-cooled rotary engine, 60 kW (80 hp)
- Propellers: 2-bladed Levasseur 450 or Régy 310 fixed pitch wooden propeller, 2.50 m (8 ft 2 in) diameter

Performance

- Maximum speed: 150 km/h (93 mph, 81 kn)
- Range: 250 km (160 mi, 130 nmi)
- Endurance: 2 hours
- Service ceiling: 5,200 m (17,100 ft)
- Time to altitude:
  - 8.45 minutes 2,000 m (6,600 ft)
  - 15.7 minutes 3,000 m (9,800 ft)

Armament

- Guns: 1 x .303 in (7.7 mm) Vickers machine gun

== See also ==
Related development

- Nieuport 11
- Nieuport 17
- Nieuport 23

Aircraft of comparable role, configuration, and era

- Hanriot HD.1

Related lists

- List of fighter aircraft
- List of military aircraft of France
- List of non-carrier aircraft flown from aircraft carriers
