= D. S. Mirsky =

Russian historian and critic (1890-1939)

Dmitry Svyatopolk-Mirsky
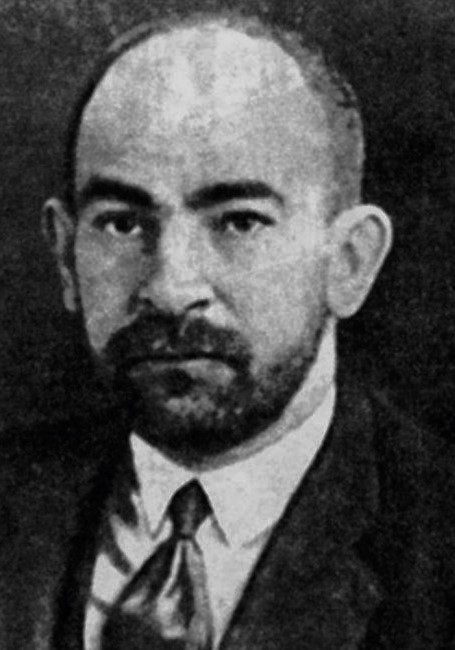
- Born: Dmitry Petrovich Svyatopolk-Mirsky; 9 September [O.S. 28 August] 1890; Giyovka estate, Lyubotin, Russian Empire (now Liubotyn, Ukraine)
- Died: 7 June 1939 (aged 48); Sevvostlag, Soviet Union
- Occupations: Writer, historian
- Writing career
- Pen name: D. S. Mirsky
- Genre: Criticism
- Subject: Literature

D. S. Mirsky is the English pen-name of Dmitry Petrovich Svyatopolk-Mirsky (Russian: Дми́трий Петро́вич Святопо́лк-Ми́рский), often known as Prince Mirsky (9 September [O.S. 28 August] 1890 – c. 7 June 1939), a Russian political and literary historian who promoted the knowledge and translations of Russian literature in the United Kingdom and of English literature in the Soviet Union. He was born in Kharkov Governorate and died in a Soviet prison camp near Magadan.

== Early life ==
He was born Prince Dmitry Petrovich Svyatopolk-Mirsky, scion of the House of Svyatopolk-Mirsky, son of knyaz Pyotr Dmitrievich Svyatopolk-Mirsky, Imperial Russian Minister of Interior, and his wife, Countess Ekaterina Bobrinskaya (1864-1926), descendant of Catherine the Great. He relinquished his princely title at an early age. During his school years, he became interested in the poetry of Russian symbolism and started writing poems himself.

== World War I and Civil War ==
Mirsky was mobilized in 1914 and saw service in the Imperial Russian Army during World War I. After the October Revolution he joined the White movement as a member of Denikin's staff. After the defeat of the White forces he fled to Poland in 1920.

== London ==
Mirsky emigrated to Great Britain in 1921. While teaching Russian literature at the University of London, Mirsky published his landmark study A History of Russian Literature: From Its Beginnings to 1880. Vladimir Nabokov has called it "the best history of Russian literature in any language including Russian". This work was followed with Contemporary Russian Literature, 1881–1925.

Mirsky was a founding member of the Eurasianist movement and the chief editor of the periodical Eurasia, his own views gradually evolving toward Marxism. He also is usually credited with coining the term National Bolshevism. In 1931, he joined the Communist Party of Great Britain and asked Maxim Gorky if he could procure his pardon by Soviet authorities. Permission to return to the USSR was granted him in 1932. On seeing him off to Russia, Virginia Woolf wrote in her diary that "soon there'll be a bullet through your head".

== Return to Russia ==
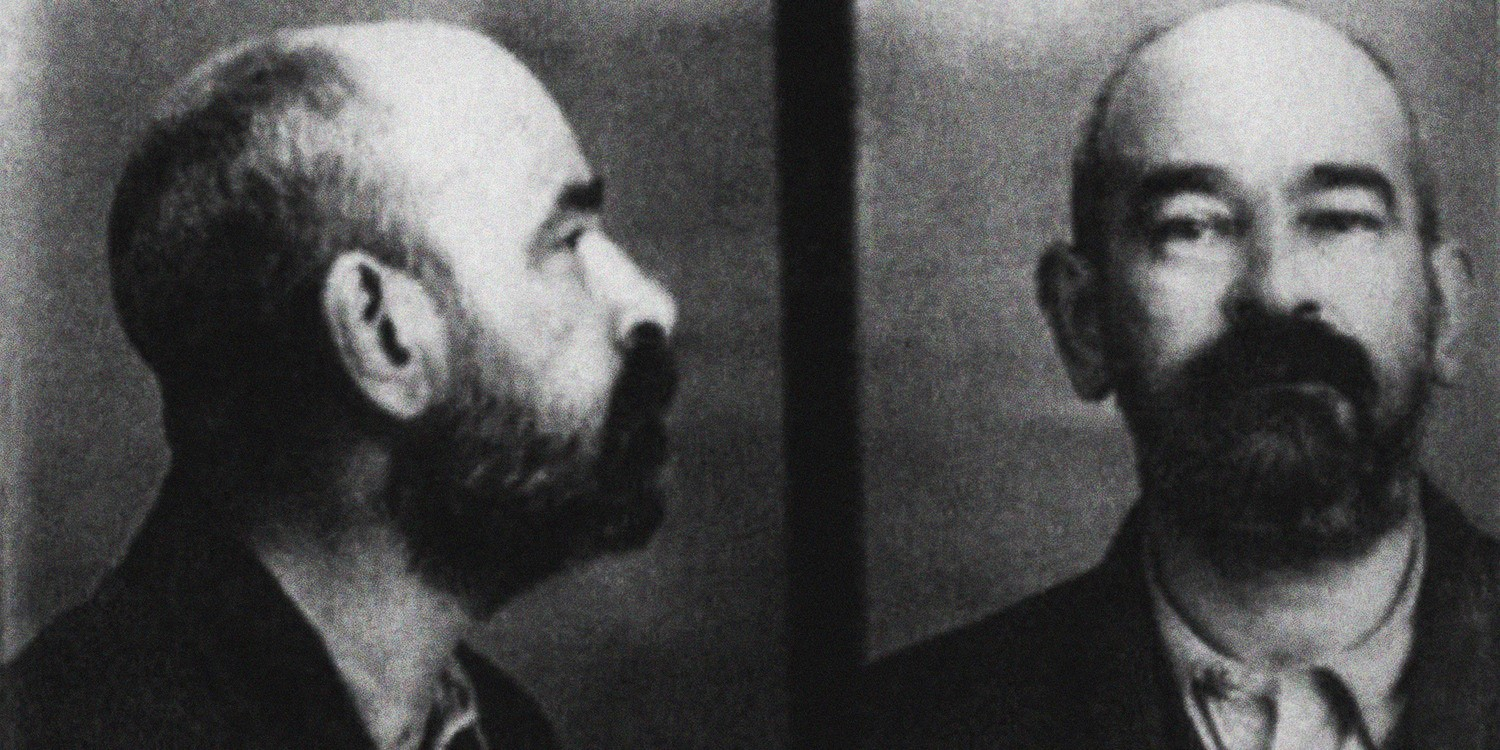
Mirsky after arrest in 1937

Mirsky returned to Russia in September 1932. Five years later, during the Great Purge, Mirsky was arrested by the NKVD. Mirsky's arrest may have been caused by a chance meeting with his friend the British historian E. H. Carr who was visiting the Soviet Union in 1937. Carr stumbled into Prince Mirsky on the streets of Leningrad (modern Saint Petersburg, Russia), and despite Prince Mirsky's best efforts to pretend not to know him, Carr persuaded his old friend to have lunch with him. Since this was at the height of the Yezhovshchina, and any Soviet citizen who had any unauthorised contact with a foreigner was likely to be regarded as a spy, the NKVD arrested Mirsky as a British spy. In April 1937, he was denounced in the journal Literaturnaya Gazeta as a "filthy Wrangelist and White Guard officer". He died in one of the gulag labour camps near Magadan in June 1939 and was buried on the 7th of that month. He was rehabilitated in 1962. Although his magnum opus was eventually published in Russia, Mirsky's reputation in his native country remains sparse.

Korney Chukovsky gives a lively portrait of Mirsky in his diary entry for 27 January 1935:

I liked him enormously: the vast erudition, the sincerity, the literary talent, the ludicrous beard and ludicrous bald spot, the suit which, though made in England, hung loosely on him, shabby and threadbare, the way he had of coming out with a sympathetic ee-ee-ee (like a guttural piglet squeal) after each sentence you uttered—it was all so amusing and endearing. Though he had very little money—he's a staunch democrat—he did inherit his well-born ancestors' gourmandise. His stomach will be the ruin of him. Every day he leaves his wretched excuse for a cap and overcoat with the concierge and goes into the luxurious restaurant [of the Hotel National in Moscow], spending no less than forty rubles on a meal (since he drinks as well as eats) plus four to tip the waiter and one to tip the concierge.

== Criticism ==
Malcolm Muggeridge, who met Mirsky after his return to the USSR, apparently met one of the author's critics, a French correspondent to Russia named Luciani, who had this to say of Mirsky: "Mirsky had pulled off the unusual feat of managing to be a parasite under three regimes — as a prince under Czarism, as a professor under Capitalism, and as an homme-de-lettres under Communism." On the other hand, Muggeridge himself said that he was "glad to be his protégé".

George Orwell called The Intelligentsia of Great Britain "a viciously malignant book", but Tariq Ali had a more favourable assessment of it.

== Selected publications ==
- Anthology of Russian Poetry (1924)
- Modern Russian Literature (1925)
- Pushkin (1926)
- Contemporary Russian Literature, 1881–1925. New York: Alfred A. Knopf. 1926. Archived from the original on 2021-10-01. (via Google Books).
- A History of Russian Literature: From the Earliest Times to the Death of Dostoyevsky (1881). New York: Alfred A. Knopf. 1927. Reprinted together with 1926 work as A History of Russian Literature. London: Routledge & Kegan Paul, 1949; Reprint: Evanston, Il: Northwestern University Press, 1999.
- A History of Russia (1928)
- Lenin (London: Holme Press, 1931).
- Russia: A Social History (1931)
- The Intelligentsia of Great Britain (1935), originally in Russian, English translation by the author
- Anthology of Modern English Poetry (1937) in Russian, published during Mirsky's arrest without acknowledgment of his authorship
