= Mir, Belarus =

Urban-type settlement in Grodno Region, Belarus

Mir Мір (Belarusian) Мир (Russian) מיר (Yiddish)
- Urban-type settlement
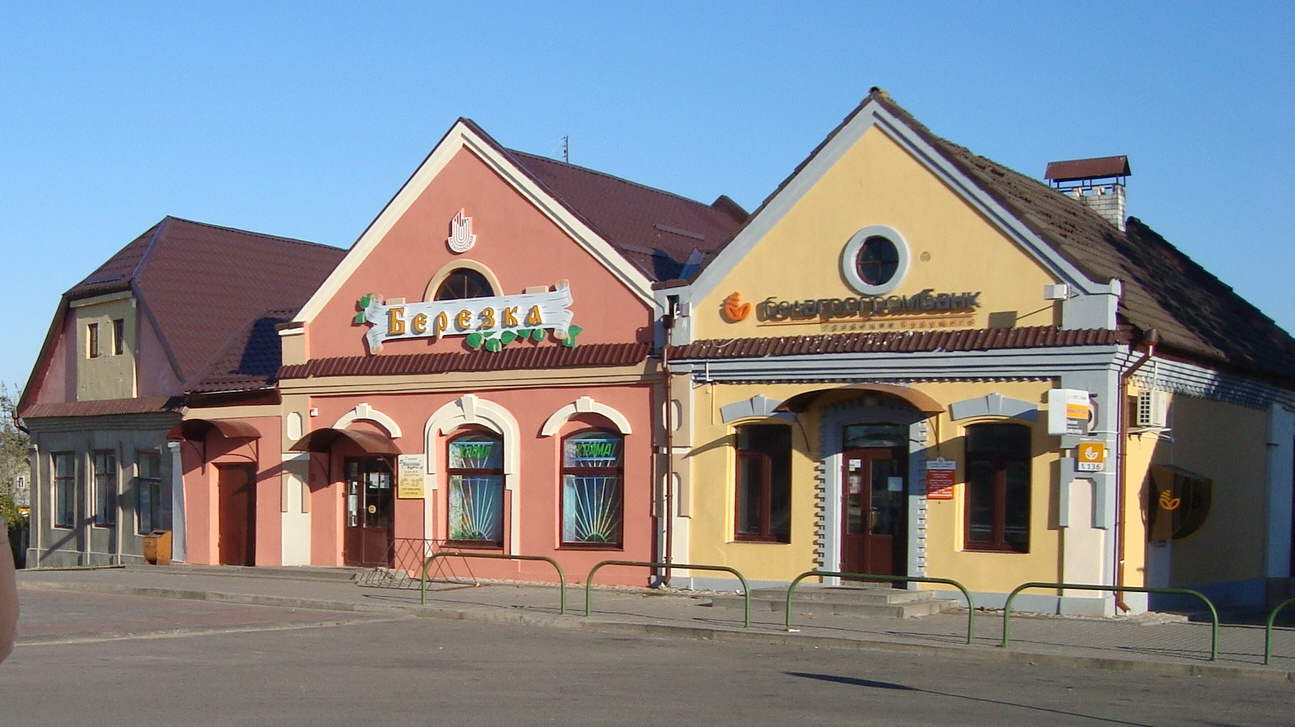

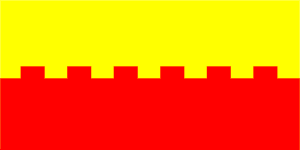
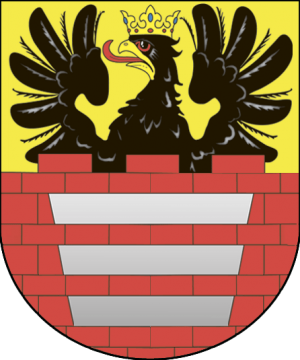
- Flag Coat of arms

- Location within Belarus
- Coordinates: 53°27′N 26°28′E
- Country: Belarus
- Region: Grodno Region
- District: Karelichy District
- First mentioned: May 28, 1434

Population (2025)
  - Total: 2,248
- Time zone: UTC+3 (MSK)
- Area code: +375-1596

Mir (Belarusian: Мір; Russian: Мир; Yiddish: מיר) is an urban-type settlement in Karelichy District, Grodno Region, Belarus. It is situated on the banks of Miranka River, about 85 kilometres (53 mi) southwest of the capital, Minsk. As of 2025, it has a population of 2,248.

== History ==
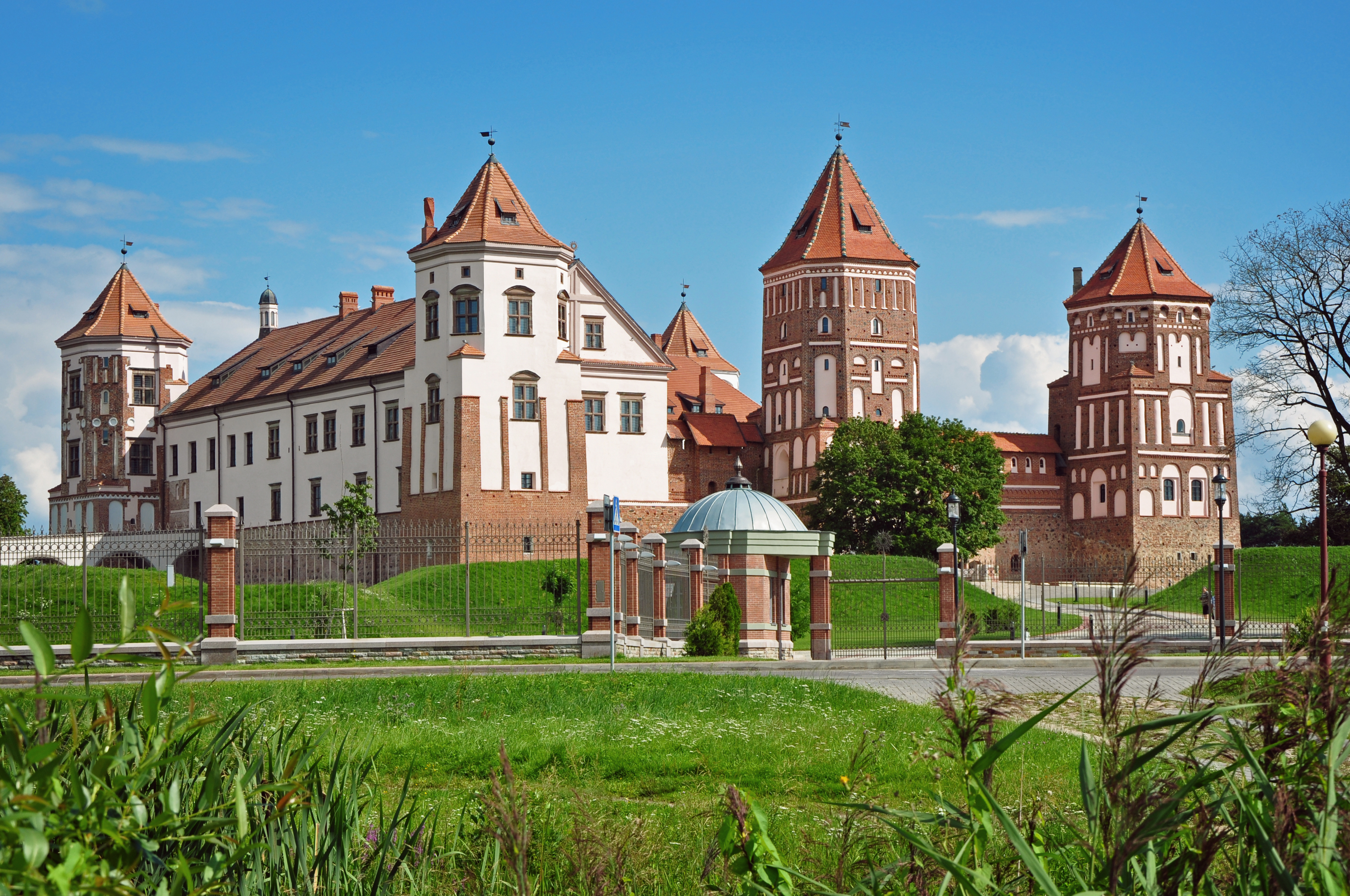
Mir Castle

Mir village was founded sometime prior to 1345. It is home to a late medieval castle, which made the town the target of many attacks over the centuries. The town belonged to the Illinič family (Korczak coat of arms) first and then to the Radziwiłł family. It was destroyed by the Swedish forces in 1655 (Deluge) and again by the Swedes during the Great Northern War in 1706. In 1792, the Lithuanian division of the Polish–Lithuanian Commonwealth army under Józef Judycki was routed by the invading Imperial Russian army corps under Boris Mellin (see Battle of Mir). During the Napoleonic invasion of Russia in 1812, Russian Imperial cavalry, artillery and cossack regiments ambushed and defeated the Duchy of Warsaw 3 uhlan divisions (Battle of Mir (1812)). The retreating Russians, withdrawing east, abandoned the town and destroyed the castle with gunpowder. During the Middle Ages it was first located in the Principality of Polotsk, after the Battle on the river Nemiga in the Principality of Minsk, then was taken over by Kievan Rus' but after the Mongol Invasion the Rus' rule diminished and since 1242 Mir belonged to the expanding and dynamic Duchy of Lithuania.

In 1569, along with the rest of the Grand Duchy of Lithuania, Mir became a part of the Polish–Lithuanian Commonwealth. In 1795, Mir was acquired by the Russian Empire as a result of the Third Partition of Poland.

From 1921 until 1939, Mir was part of the Second Polish Republic. On 17 September 1939, the town was occupied by the Red Army and, on 14 November 1939, incorporated into the Byelorussian SSR.

In the 1920s, somewhere around 3000 Jews lived in the town. By the eve of World War II however, the Jewish population had decreased to around 2000 people.

From 27 June 1941 until 7 July 1944, Mir was occupied by Nazi Germany and administered as a part of the Generalbezirk Weißruthenien of the Reichskommissariat Ostland. With the city being occupied only 35 days after the beginning of Operation Barbarossa, there was little time to escape, and Jews who had fled nearby settlements and western Poland had accumulated in Mir alongside the existing Jewish community. Three months after the occupation began, a ghetto was formally established within the city by German authorities, and all Jews living within the town – the amount of which had by then swollen to over 3,000 people – were forcibly resettled within it. It was finally liquidated on 13 August 1942 – in the final days before its liquidation, a resistance group of around 80 people, under the leadership of Oswald Rufeisen, operated in it. The group organised a plan that managed to help a group of 150 to 300 of the ghetto's inhabitants escape into the forest, where they joined the Bielski and Soviet partisans. It has been estimated that in total, approximately 2,900 Jews were killed in Mir during the German occupation.

After the end of the war, it remained within the Byelorussian SSR until 1991, when it became part of the independent Republic of Belarus.

Mir was the site of two very famous horse fairs associated with Saint Nikolaus feast days, first held on May 9 and the second fair on December 6 each year. Both fairs lasted four weeks each and were very popular and well known throughout the country until 1939. Roma practically dominated the fairs as horse traders, and numerous Roma community thrived in the town until 1939. The fairs collapsed in 1941, when Nazi Germany invaded the Belorussian Soviet Republic and murdered the Roma people of Mir.

Mir's claim to fame in Jewish diaspora history is that it was the original home of the Mir Yeshiva which operated there intermittently from 1815 until the fall of Poland in 1939, when the invading communist Soviet Red Army and security forces pressured the school to close and relocate to then still free Lithuania. (Current incarnations of the yeshiva are located in Brooklyn, New York, Jerusalem and Modi'in Illit.)

Today, Mir has little industry and is no longer an internationally renowned center of Jewish learning or Roma horse trade. Home to about 2,500 people, virtually none of whom are descended from the once thriving Jewish and Roma communities, its primary attraction is the Mir Castle as well as memorials erected by the Soviet government and various Jewish groups over the past half century. On the eve of World War II, some 2,400 Jews lived in Mir, about half of the town's population. All of them, except about 150-300 escapees, were murdered by the Germans in 1941. One of the escapees, Elia Miranski, reported in an interview given in 2013 that entire neighborhoods had been destroyed by the Germans and the town today is significantly smaller than it was; outlines of the former neighborhood streets can be seen on Google Earth to the northeast of the castle along the river.

== Notable residents ==
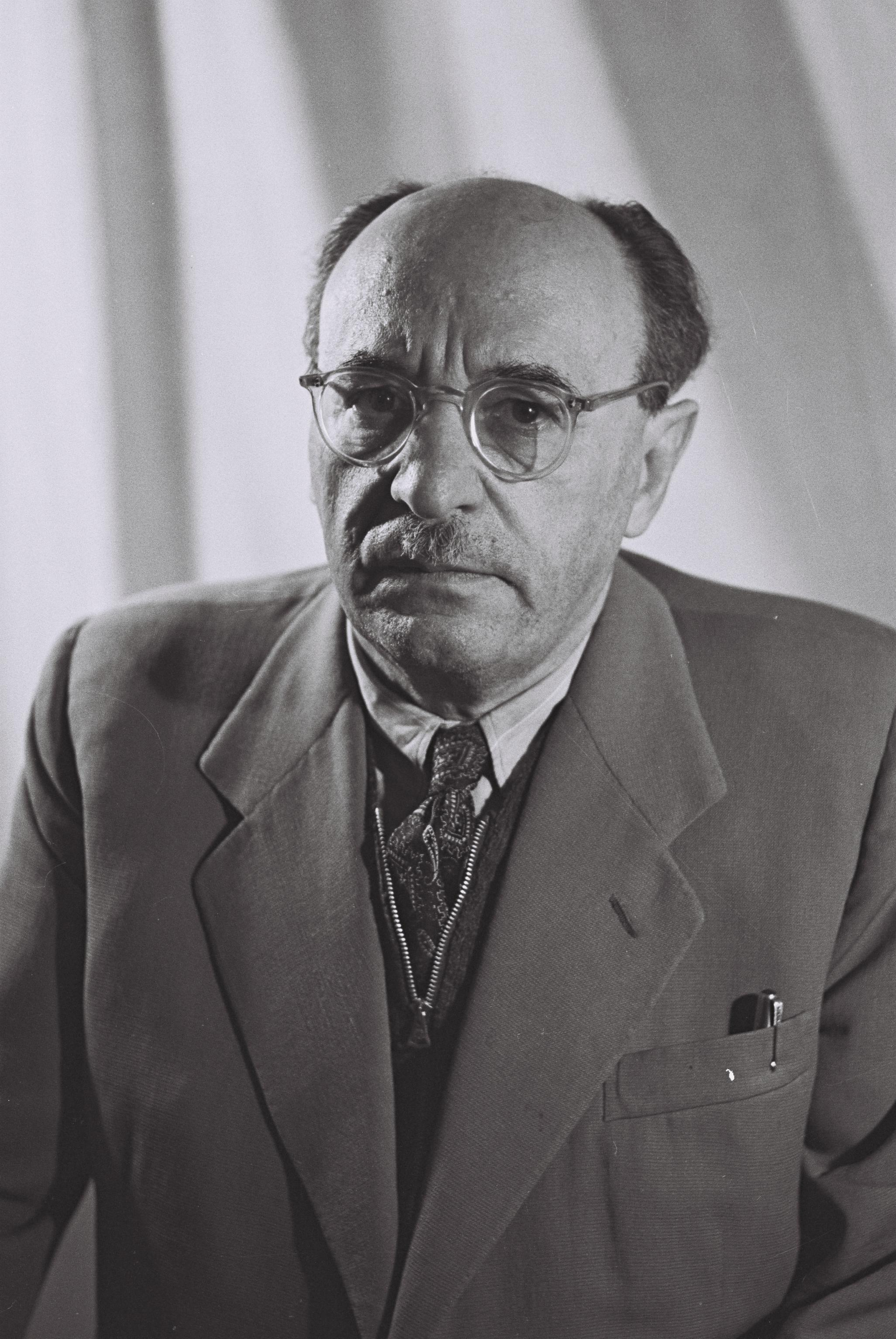
Zalman Shazar

- Naftali Zvi Yehuda Berlin (1816–1893), commonly known by the acronym Netziv, orthodox rabbi, rosh yeshiva and author of several works of rabbinic literature
- Zalman Shazar (born Shneur Zalman Rubashov; 1889–1974), Israeli author, poet, and third President of Israel from 1963 to 1973
- Jan Zaprudnik (1926–2022), American-Belarusian historian and publicist

== See also ==
- Mir Castle Complex
- St. Nicholas' Church, Mir
- Mir Yeshiva (Belarus)
- Battle of Mir
- Isser Zalman Meltzer
- History of the Jews in Belarus
- Karelichy
- Grodno Region
- Chapel-burial vault of Svyatopolk-Mirsky family
