= Pyotr Sviatopolk-Mirsky =

Russian politician (1857–1914)

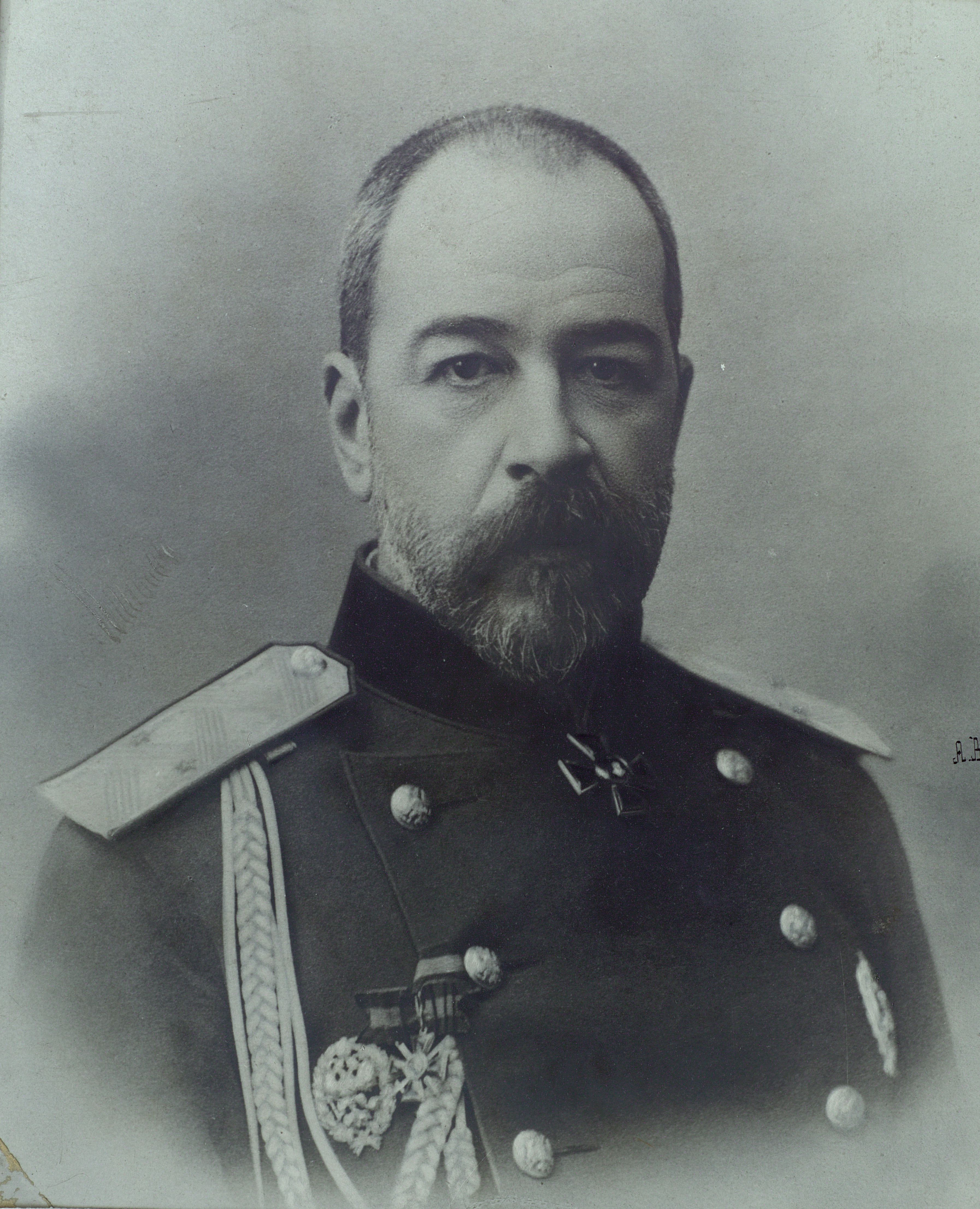
Pyotr Dmitrievich Svyatopolk-Mirsky

Prince Pyotr Dmitrievich Svyatopolk-Mirsky (Russian: Пётр Дми́триевич Святопо́лк-Ми́рский, tr. Pyotr Dmítriyevich Svyatopolk-Mírskiy; 30 August [O.S. 18 August] 1857 in Vladikavkaz – 29 May [O.S. 16 May] 1914 in Saint Petersburg, Russian Empire) was a Russian general, politician, and police official.

== Family ==
Svyatopolk-Mirsky was born in Vladikavkaz into the prominent Svyatopolk-Mirsky family. He was the only son of the general Dmitry Ivanovich Svyatopolk-Mirsky and Georgian Princess Sofia Orbeliani. Pyotr was educated at Page Corps, graduating in 1874 with first-class honours, and was appointed Page of the Chamber. In 1875, he became a cornet at Her Empress Leib-Guards Hussars. He was the father to literary historian D. S. Mirsky.

== Military career ==
Svyatopolk-Mirsky took part in the Russo-Turkish War, 1877–78 and was decorated for valour in the Battle of Kars. Then he studied at the General Staff Academy and graduated in 1881.

In 1884, he was made the acting commander of the staff of 31st Infantry division, and in 1887, he was appointed to commander of staff of 3d Grenadier division.

== Political career ==
In 1895, he was appointed the governor of Penza, and in 1897 the governor of Yekaterinoslav.

In 1900, Dmitry Sipyagin appointed Svyatopolk-Mirsky assistant Minister of the Interior and commander of the Imperial Corps of Gendarmes. After Sipyagin's assassination in 1902, Svyatopolk-Mirsky resigned as assistant minister but was persuaded to accept the position of Governor-General of Vilna (modern-day Lithuania and Belarus). As the Governor-General, Svyatopolk-Mirsky was credited with successful liberal reforms, defusing national tensions in the province by allowing more rights to the national minorities and stopping pogroms against the Jews.

In August 1904, he succeeded to the position of Minister of the Interior after Plehve's assassination. His appointment was seen as a victory of Liberals over the Conservatives and in the Court term as a victory of the party of widow Empress Maria Fyodorovna (who supported the liberal reforms and was a patroness of Pyotr's sister Olga) over the party of Empress consort Alexandra Fyodorovna.

The Conservative Ministers Witte and Sipiagin credited Svyatopolk-Mirsky with being an honourable, intelligent man of the highest moral principles, which is notable due to his attempts at liberal reform in Imperial Russia while minister. The reforms began with permitting members of the local zemstvos to gather to discuss broader policy issues and coordination of zemstvo programs, something that had not been permitted in Russia regularly. The remaining reforms were embodied in a decree that called for the inclusion of elected members to the State Council, removal of the restrictions on the Old Believers, measures to strengthen legality, extend freedom of the press and religion, broaden the authority of local self-government, eliminate unnecessary restrictions on non-Russians, and do away with exceptional laws in general. Svyatopolk-Mirsky not only allowed the congress but also participated in its work and personally delivered its decision to Tsar Nicholas II along with his own plan for constitutional reforms.

Svyatopolk-Mirsky's plan included transferring more power to the State Council of Imperial Russia. The plan was much less radical than the reforms implemented by the October Manifesto 1905, but in December 1904, it was considered ultra-radical and was dismissed.

The massacre of a peaceful demonstration in Saint Petersburg, known as Bloody Sunday, occurred on 22 January [O.S. 9 January] 1905. According to Svyatopolk-Mirsky, he never had authorised the shooting of the demonstrators but still fulfilled his final duty to the tsar and became the scapegoat for the massacre. According to Svyatopolk-Mirsky's opponents, he not only authorised the shooting but also actively encouraged the demonstration to push his own political agenda.

Svyatopolk-Mirsky was replaced as minister of the Interior by Alexander Bulygin in February 1905 and retired from government service. As a retired Minister of Interior, he was expected to be appointed a member of the State Council of Imperial Russia, but it was not the case. He retired from the political life until his death on 16 May 1914.

Preceded by Vyacheslav von Plehve	Minister of Interior; July 1904 – February 1905	Succeeded by Alexander Bulygin
