= Dmitry Ivanovich Sviatopolk-Mirsky =

Russian general (1825–1899)

Dmitry Svyatopolk-Mirsky Дмитрий Святополк-Мирский
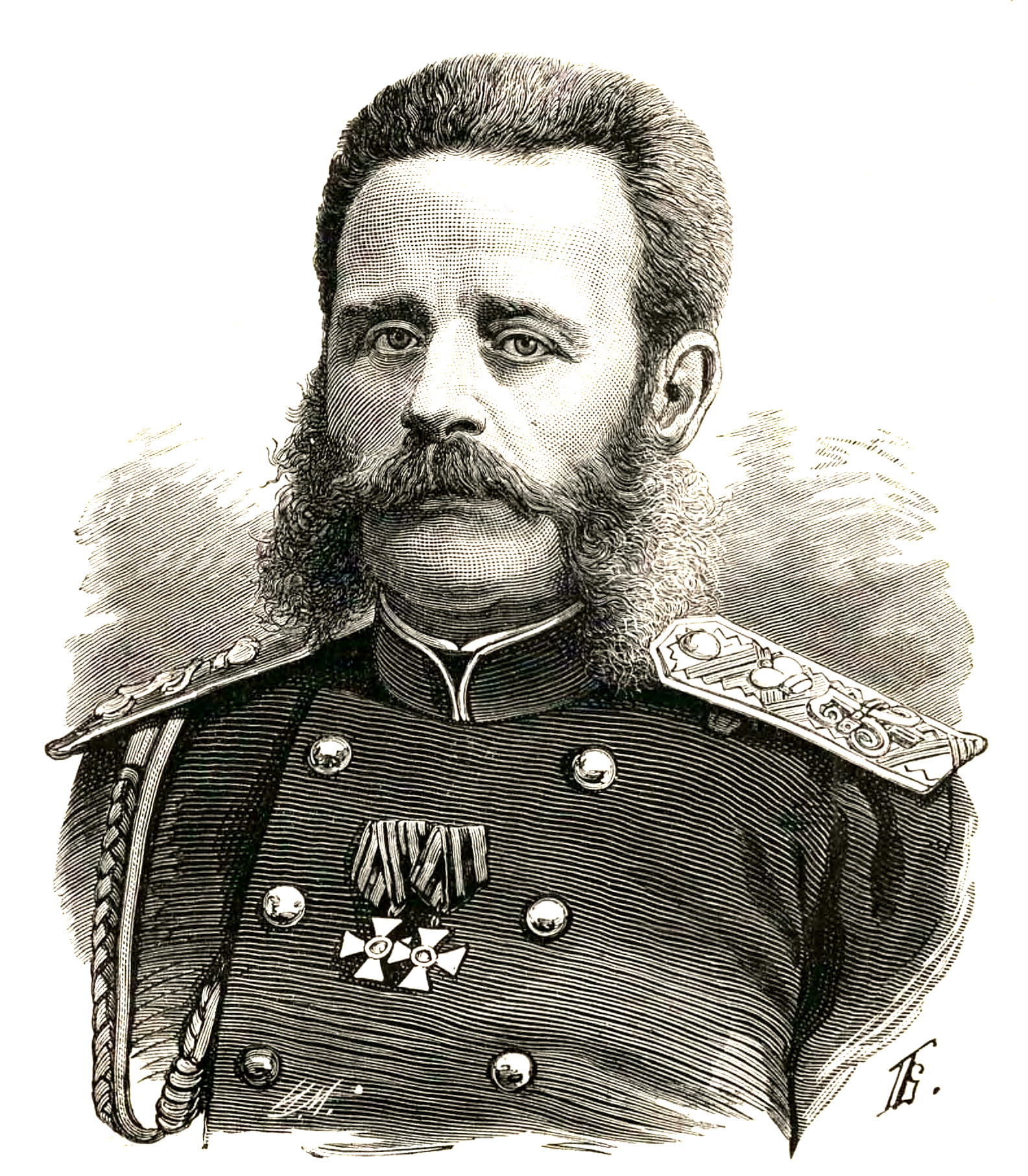
- Born: 1825; Saint Petersburg, Russian Empire
- Died: 1899 (aged 73–74); Nice, France
- Burial place: Liubotyn, Ukraine; 49°55′28″N 35°57′12″E
- Relatives: Sofia Orbeliani (wife); Pyotr Dmitrievich (son); Nina Dmitrievna (daughter); Olga Dmitrievna (daughter); Maria Dmitrievna (daughter)
- Military career
- Allegiance: Russian Empire
- Branch: Infantry
- Service years: 1841–1878
- Rank: General of the Infantry
- Commands: 29th Chernigov Infantry Regiment; Kabardian Infantry Regiment; Caucasian Army; Caucasus Military District; Kharkov Military District
- Wars: Caucasian War; Crimean War; Russo-Turkish War
- Other work: Governor of Kharkov

Prince Dmitry Ivanovich Svyatopolk-Mirsky (Russian: Дмитрий Иванович Святополк-Мирский; 1825–1899) was an Imperial Russian Army general, a politician and a member of the princely Svyatopolk-Mirsky family.

== Background ==
Svyatopolk-Mirsky was born to the family of Tomasz Bogumił Jan Światopełk-Mirski, the ambassador to Russia from the semi-independent Kingdom of Poland. Dmitry's patronymic Ivanovich was based on a Russified form of the third name of his father. Despite being a member of a Polish szlachta, he was brought up in Saint Petersburg and considered himself Russian. The family's princely title was confirmed by the tsars when they relocated to Russia.

== Career ==
He began his military service in 1841 in the Caucasian War, fighting against Chechens and Daghestanis. During the Crimean War, he took part in the battles in Kurukdere and Bayandur in Armenia. He commanded the Chernigov Infantry Regiment during the Battle of Chernaya River, where he was seriously wounded. During the Crimean War, he became acquainted with the then junior officer Leo Tolstoy, with whom he had lifelong correspondence.

From 1857 to 1859, Svyatopolk-Mirsky commanded the Kabarda Regiment, took part in the storm of Gunib, and the capture of Imam Shamil. After the pacification of the Eastern Caucasus, he became the governor of the Terek Oblast, then the Governor-General of Kutaisi. In 1876, he became the deputy of the Viceroy of the Caucasus Grand Duke Mikhail Nikolayevich.

During the Russo-Turkish War, 1877-78, Svyatopolk-Mirsky was the chief of the General Staff of the Russian troops during the Battle of Kars. In 1880, he became a member of the State Council of Imperial Russia, and, in 1884, he became the governor of the Kharkov Governorate. He died in 1899 in Nice, France and was buried at the family estate, "Gievka," near Liubotyn in the former Kharkov Governorate.

== Family ==
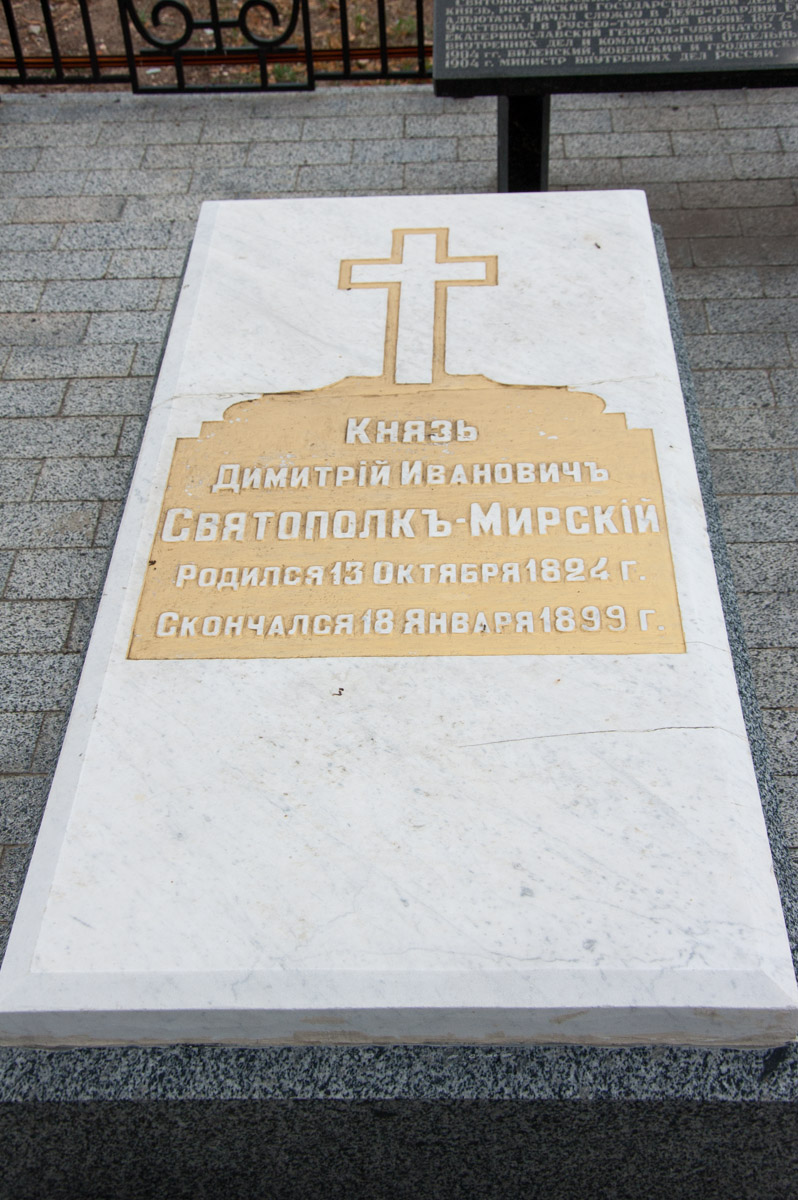
Gravesite at the family estate, "Gievka," near Liubotyn

Sviatopolk-Mirsky and his wife, Georgian princess Sofia Orbeliani (daughter of Prince Iakob Orbeliani), had one son, Pyotr Dmitrievich Svyatopolk-Mirsky, future Minister of the Interior of Russia, and three daughters: Nina (1852-1926), Olga (? -1898) and Maria (1853-1889).

Nina, Olga and Maria each married prominent administrators of Imperial Russia: Woldemar von Daehn, Lord Sippola, Minister State Secretary of Finland; Prince Alexander Baryatinsky and Prince Ivan Makarovich Orbeliani, respectively. Olga was also a lady-in-waiting (before her marriage) and a lifelong friend to Empress Maria Fyodorovna, wife of Tsar Alexander III of Russia.

His younger brother, Nikolai Svyatopolk-Mirsky, was also a prominent general and politician.

== Awards ==
- 1845 Cross of St. George
- 1848 Order of St Vladimir 4th degree
- 1849 Order of St. Anne, 3rd degree
- 1854 Order of St. Anne, 2nd degree
- 1856 Order of St George, 4th degree
- 1859 Order of St. Anne, 1st degree
- 1860 Order of St Vladimir 3rd degree
- 1861 Order of St Vladimir 2nd degree
- 1866 Order of St. Alexander Nevsky
- 1863 Order of the White Eagle
- 1877 Order of St George, 2nd degree
- 1879 Order of St Vladimir 1st degree
- 1895 Order of St. Andrew
