= Svyatopolk-Mirsky =

Russian and Lithuanian noble family

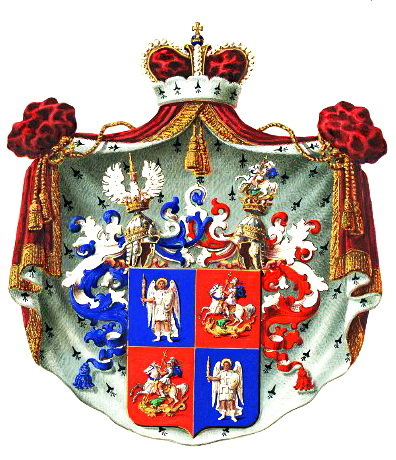
Coat of Arms of the Princes Sviatopolk-Mirsky

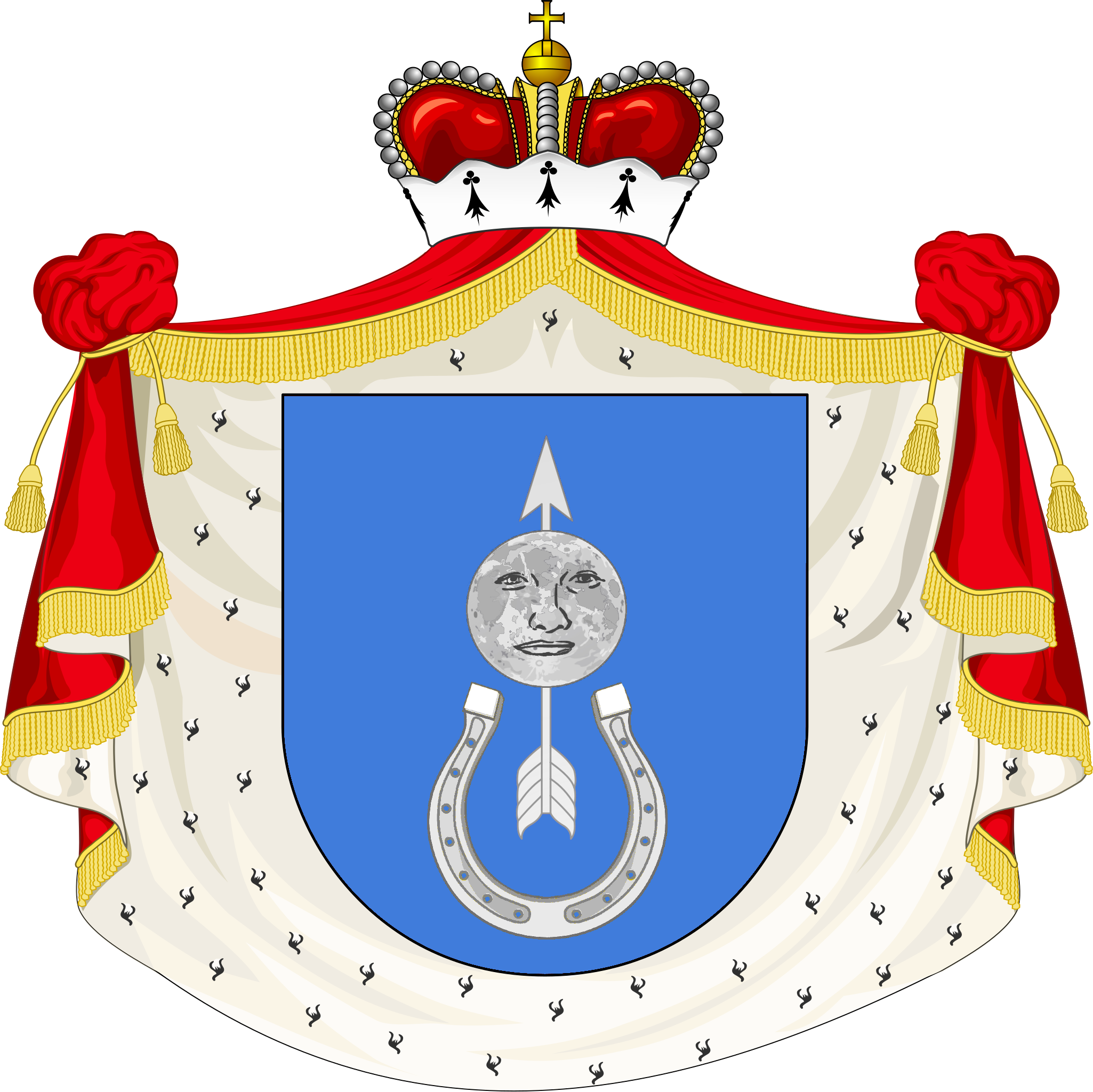
Nikolai Sviatopolk-Mirsky and his descendants used a variation of the Białynia coat of arms

The House of Sviatopolk-Mirsky (Belarusian: Святаполк-Мірскі, romanized: Svjatapołk-Mirski, Russian: Святополк-Мирский, romanized: Svyatopolk-Mirsky, Polish: Światopełk-Mirski, also transliterated using Swiatopolk or Mirskii) is a family of nobility in the Grand Duchy of Lithuania, Russian Empire, and Poland that originated from present-day northwestern Belarus.

They first appeared in the Grand Duchy of Lithuania in the late 15th century as "Mirsky" – the name probably derived from the town of Miory in the former Principality of Polotsk, although it is possible that the family had been local rulers for some centuries beforehand. The memoirs of Prince Pyotr Vladimirovich Dolgorukov assert that the Sviatopolk-Mirsky family were nobility descending from Rurik who submitted to Gediminas (Grand Duke of Lithuania from 1316 to 1341) and became magnates. The Genealogical Handbook of the Nobility (Genealogisches Handbuch des Adels) states that the Sviatopolk-Mirsky family descends from a younger branch of the Princes of Turov. Two members of the family – Bogusław and Stanisław – were representatives at the Great Sejm in 1791.

Tomasz Bogumił Jan Światopełk-Mirski (1788–1868) fought in the Polish 1830 November Uprising near Suwałki and fled into exile in Paris, where he both represented the interests of the exiled Poles in France and attempted to seek pardon from the tsar. He became an active participant in the French colonization of Algiers, where he received a large grant of land and allegedly suggested the formation of the French Foreign Legion in order to reduce the burden of Polish exiles on the French state. He converted to Orthodoxy from Roman Catholicism, and his fellow-Polish rebels regarded him as a traitor for his outspoken support of Pan-Slavism. Eventually allowed to return to Russia, he remained under house arrest there until his death. His sons, Dmitry (1825–1899) and Nikolai (1833–1898), were educated as members of the Russian nobility and had distinguished military careers.

Tomasz Bogumił claimed a Rurikid descent: according to his claim the Mirskys descended from Sviatopolk I of Kiev (died 1019), even if some genealogists of Poland and Russia in the 19th century rejected these claims. Despite this, his pro-Russian attitudes and allegiance to the Tsars earned his branch of the family the confirmation of their dubious princely title by Emperor Alexander II of Russia in 1861 (the Senate of the Polish Kingdom had previously confirmed it in 1821). Nikolai bought the historic castle of Mir in 1895 due to its name, the family having no historic connection with it.

Other branches of the family remained in Poland by choice and retained estates near Braslaw and Miory until 1940. Adam Napoleon Mirski of Zawierz and his sister, Maria, were painted by Jan Rustem in 1808. The painting, "Portrait of Maria Mirska, Adam Napoleon Mirski and Barbara Szumska" is on display at the National Museum in Warsaw.

Tomasz (died 1852) was an officer in Napoleon's Grand Duchy of Warsaw cavalry. Father Eugeniusz Światopełk-Mirski, a Catholic priest, was murdered by the Bolsheviks in Mogilev in 1918. Father Antoni Swiatopelk-Mirski (1907–1942) was martyred in Russia by the Nazis and has recently been advanced by the Vatican as a candidate for beatification. Two teenage members of the family, Krzysztof and Michał Światopełk-Mirski, were killed in the 1944 Warsaw Uprising.

The most notable Svyatopolk-Mirsky members are in the Russian branch:

- Tomasz Bogumił Jan Światopełk-Mirski (1788–1868) — ambassador of the Polish Diet to Russia.
  - Dmitry Ivanovich Svyatopolk-Mirsky (1825–1899), son of Tomasz — Russian Infantry General and politician, hero of the Caucasus and Russo-Turkish wars, member of the State Council of Imperial Russia; Short biography (in Russian)
    - Pyotr Dmitrievich Sviatopolk-Mirsky (1857–1914), son of Dmitry Ivanovich — the governor of Penza and Vilna gubernias, Minister of the Interior of Russia. mini-profile (in Russian)
      - Dmitry Pyotrovich Sviatopolk-Mirsky (1890–1939, pen name D. S. Mirsky), son of Pyotr Dmitrievich — Russian writer, historian and essayist
  - Nikolai Sviatopolk-Mirsky (1833–1898), a younger brother of Dmitry Ivanovich — hero of the Caucasus and Russo-Turkish wars, ataman of the Don Cossack Voisko, member of the State Council of Imperial Russia.

Tragically, the importance of the family in Russia came to an end during the tumultuous years of the Russian Revolution and the subsequent establishment of the Soviet Union. Many family members were persecuted and sometimes even executed during this period.

After the Russian Revolution, the Sviatopolk-Mirsky family had to go into exile in Europe and the Americas. Today, the family's legacy continues through their historical and cultural contributions, as well as through the descendants who carry on their name and heritage.

== See also ==
- Chapel-burial vault of Svyatopolk-Mirsky family
