= Mir Castle Complex =

Castle in Mir, Belarus

UNESCO World Heritage Site
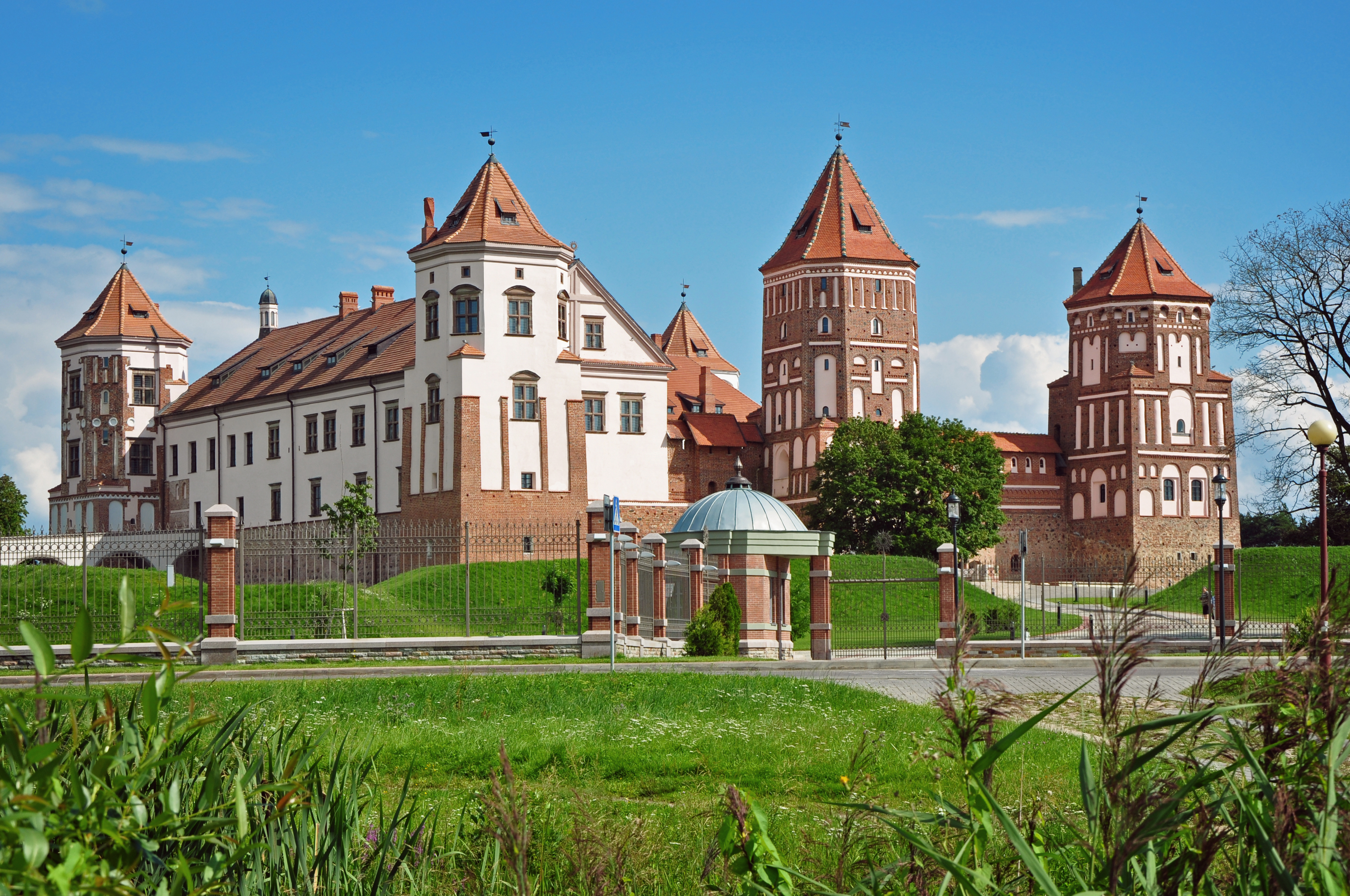

- Location within Belarus
- Location: Mir, Belarus
- Criteria: Cultural: ii, iv
- Reference: 625
- Inscription: 2000 (24th Session)
- Area: 27 ha (67 acres)
- Website: mirzamak.by/en/
- Coordinates: 53°27′4.46″N 26°28′22.80″E

The Mir Castle Complex (Belarusian: Мірскі замак, romanized: Mirski zamak; Russian: Мирский замок, romanized: Mirsky zamok; Polish: Zamek w Mirze; Lithuanian: Myriaus pilies kompleksas) is a historic fortified castle and a UNESCO World Heritage Site in Belarus. It is located in the town of Mir, in Karelichy District of Grodno Oblast, 29 kilometres (18 mi) north-west of another World Heritage site, Nesvizh Castle. Mir Castle Complex is 164 metres (538 ft) above sea level. Erected in the 16th century in the late Brick Gothic style, it is one of the few remaining architectural monuments of the former Polish–Lithuanian Commonwealth in contemporary Belarus.

== History ==
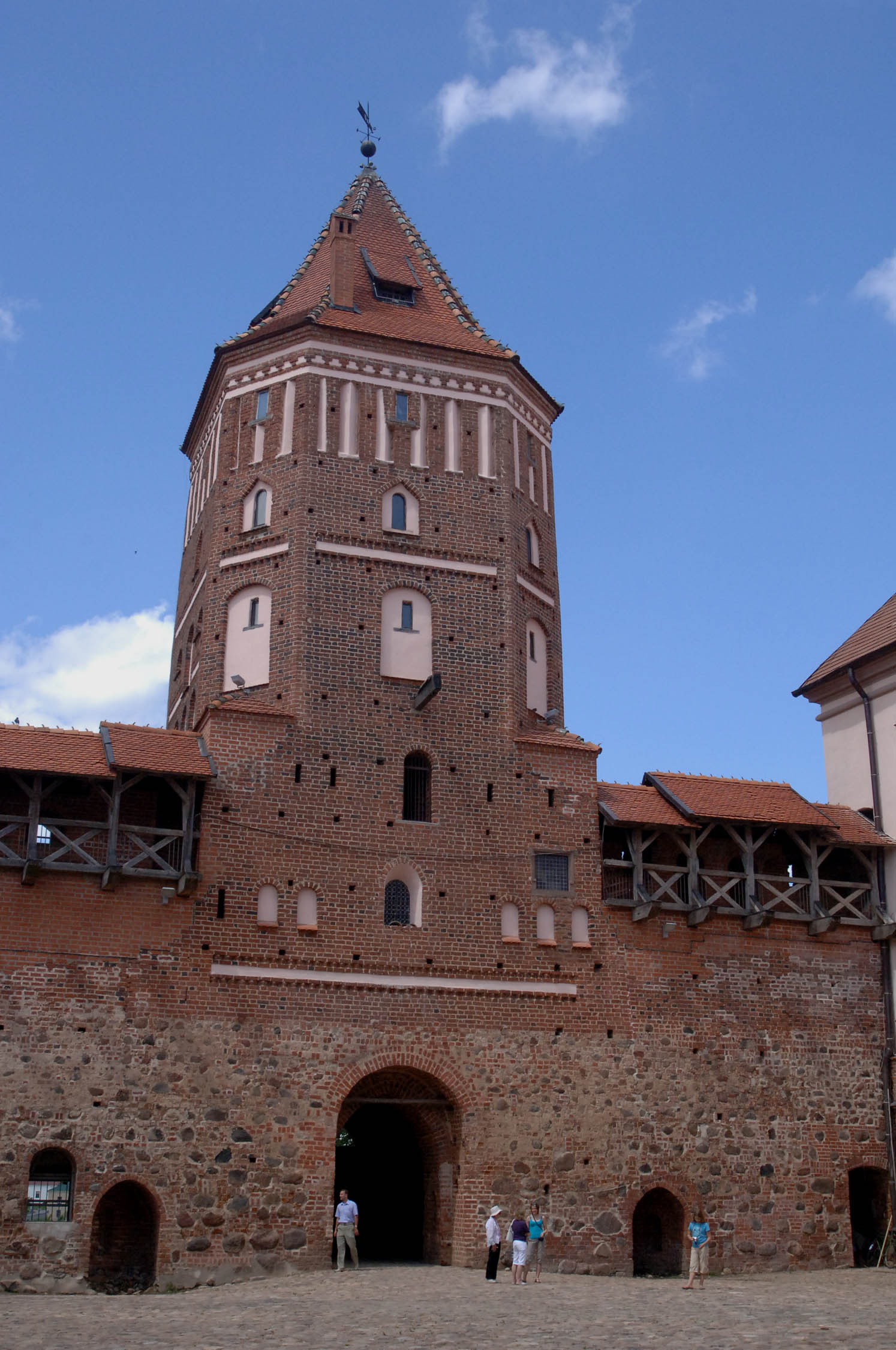
View from the courtyard

Duke Juryj Ivanavič Illinič began construction of the castle near the village of Mir after the turn of the 16th century in the Belarusian Gothic style. Five towers surrounded the courtyard of the citadel, the walls of which formed a square of 75 metres (246 ft) on each side. In 1568, when the Ilyinich dynasty died out, the Mir Castle passed into the hands of Mikalaj Kryštafor "the Orphan" Radziwil, who refitted it with a two-winged, three-story stately residence along the eastern and northern inner walls of the castle. Plastered facades were decorated with limestone portals, plates, balconies and porches in the Renaissance style.

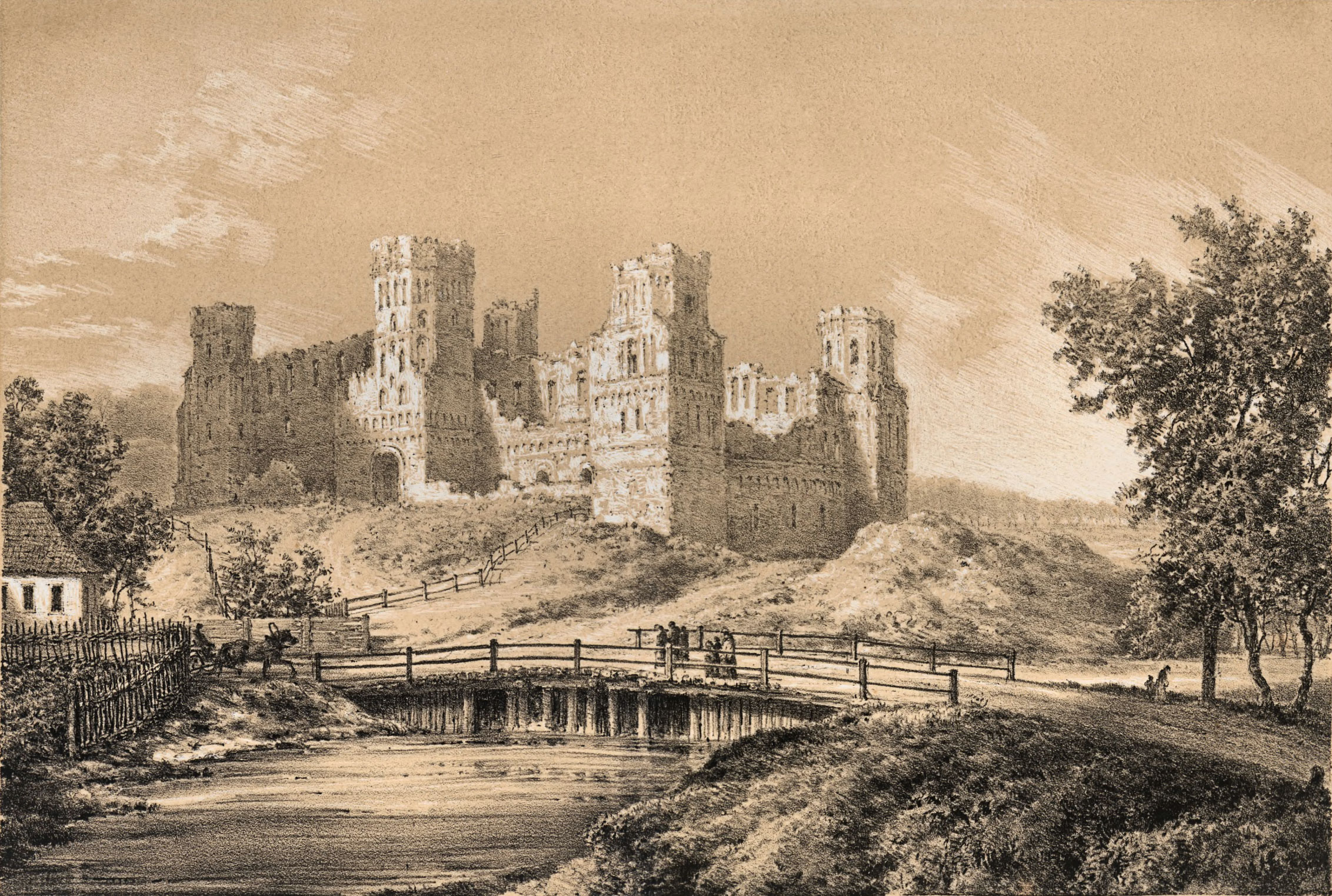
Drawing by Napoleon Orda, 1876

In 1817, after the castle had been abandoned for nearly a century and had suffered severe damage in the Battle of Mir (1812), owner Daminik Hieranim Radziwil died of battle injuries and the castle passed to his daughter Stefania, who married Ludwig zu Sayn-Wittgenstein-Berleburg. Later the castle became a possession of their daughter Maria, who married Prince Chlodwig Hohenlohe-Schillingsfürst.

Their son, Maurice Hohenlohe-Schillingsfürst, sold the castle to Mikalaj Sviatapolk-Mirski, of the Bialynia clan, in 1895. Mikalaj's son Michail began to rebuild the castle according to the plans of architect Teodor Bursche. The Sviatapolk-Mirski family owned the castle until 1939, when the Soviet Union occupied Western Belarus.

When German forces invaded the Soviet Union in 1941, they occupied the castle and converted it to a ghetto for the local Jewish population, prior to their murders. Between 1944 and 1956, the castle was used as a housing facility, resulting in damage to the castle's interior.

In December 2000, the Mir Castle was listed by UNESCO as a World Heritage Site.

== Related World Heritage Sites ==
- Nesvizh Castle
- Litomyšl Castle

== Gallery ==
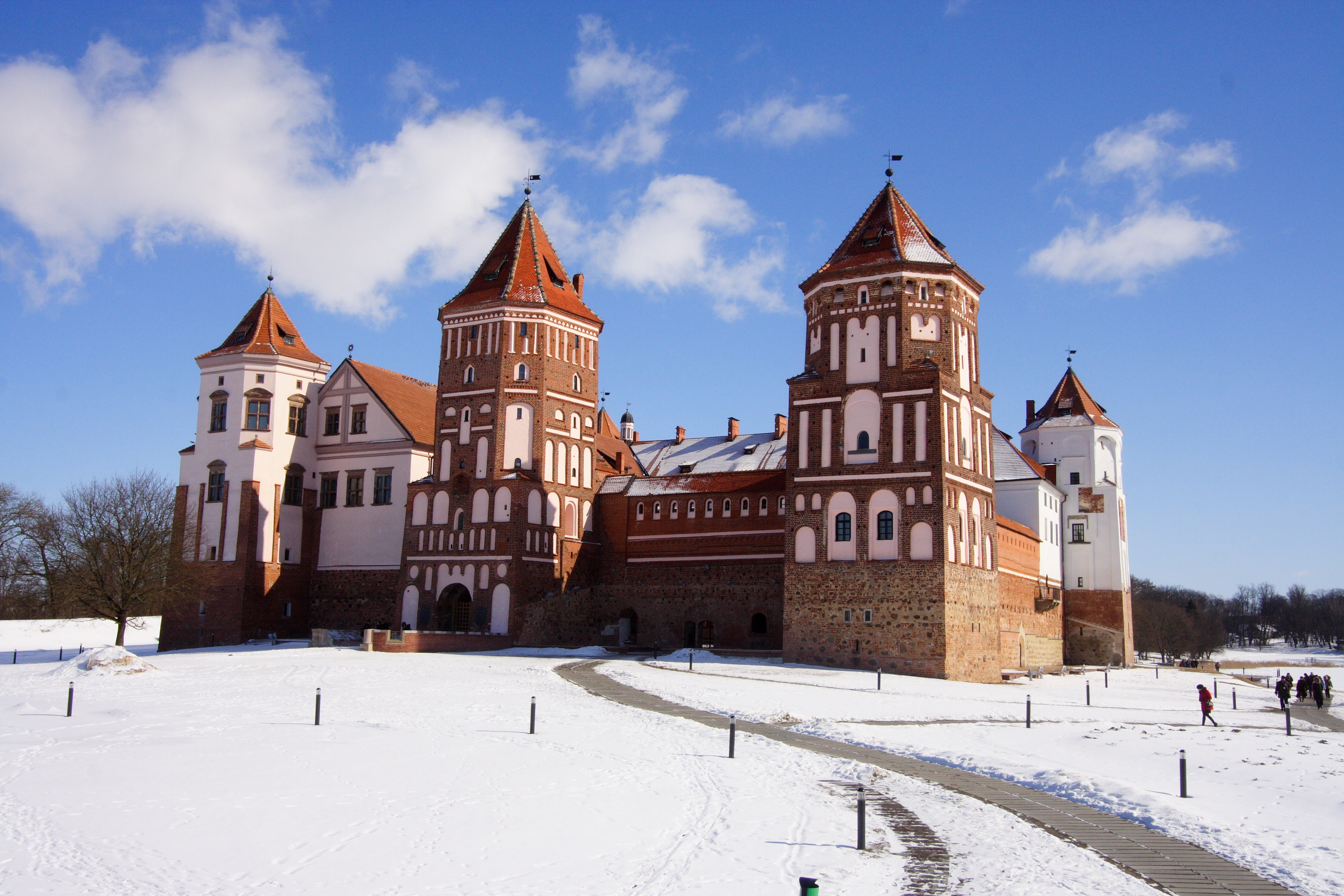

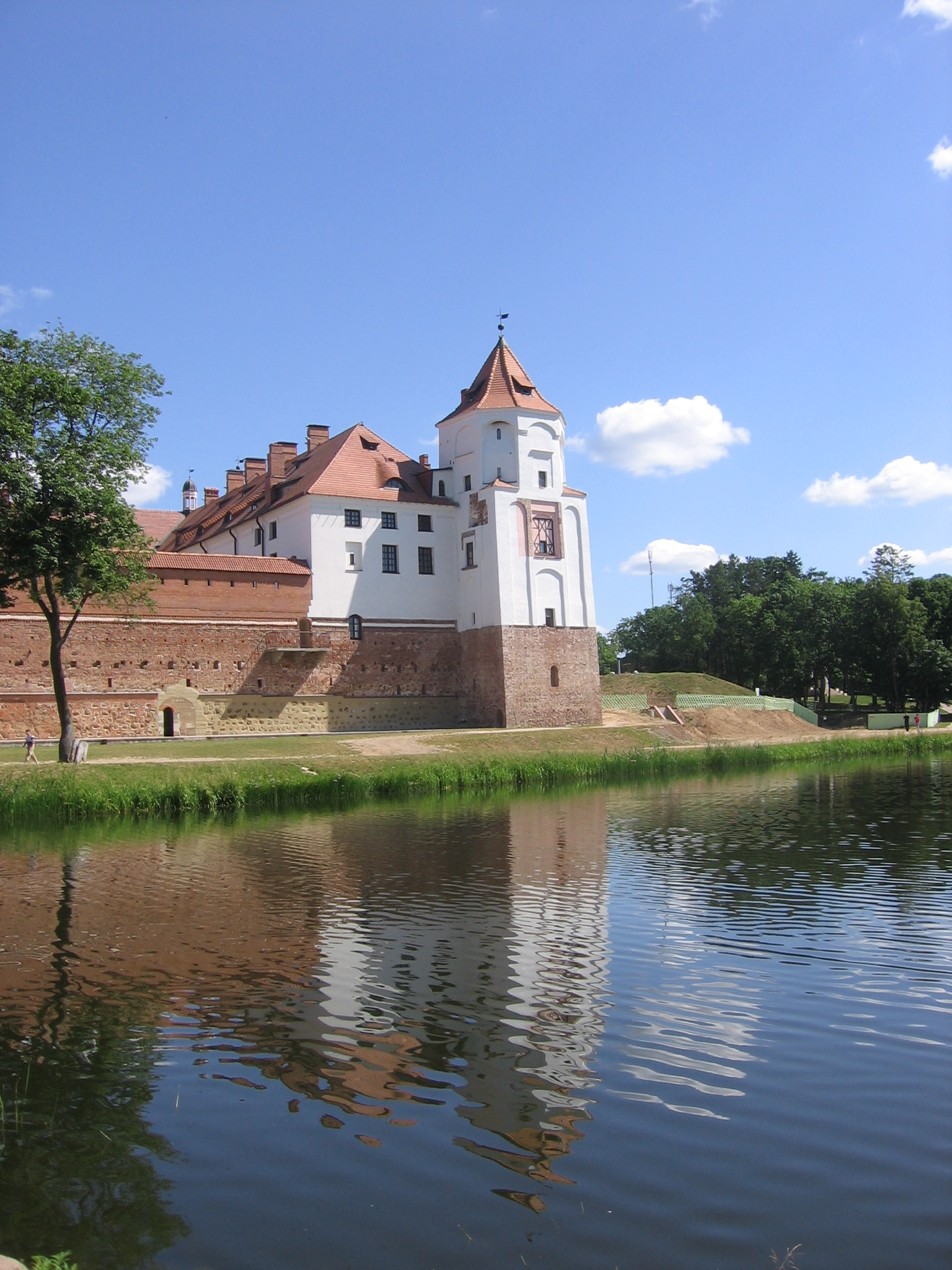

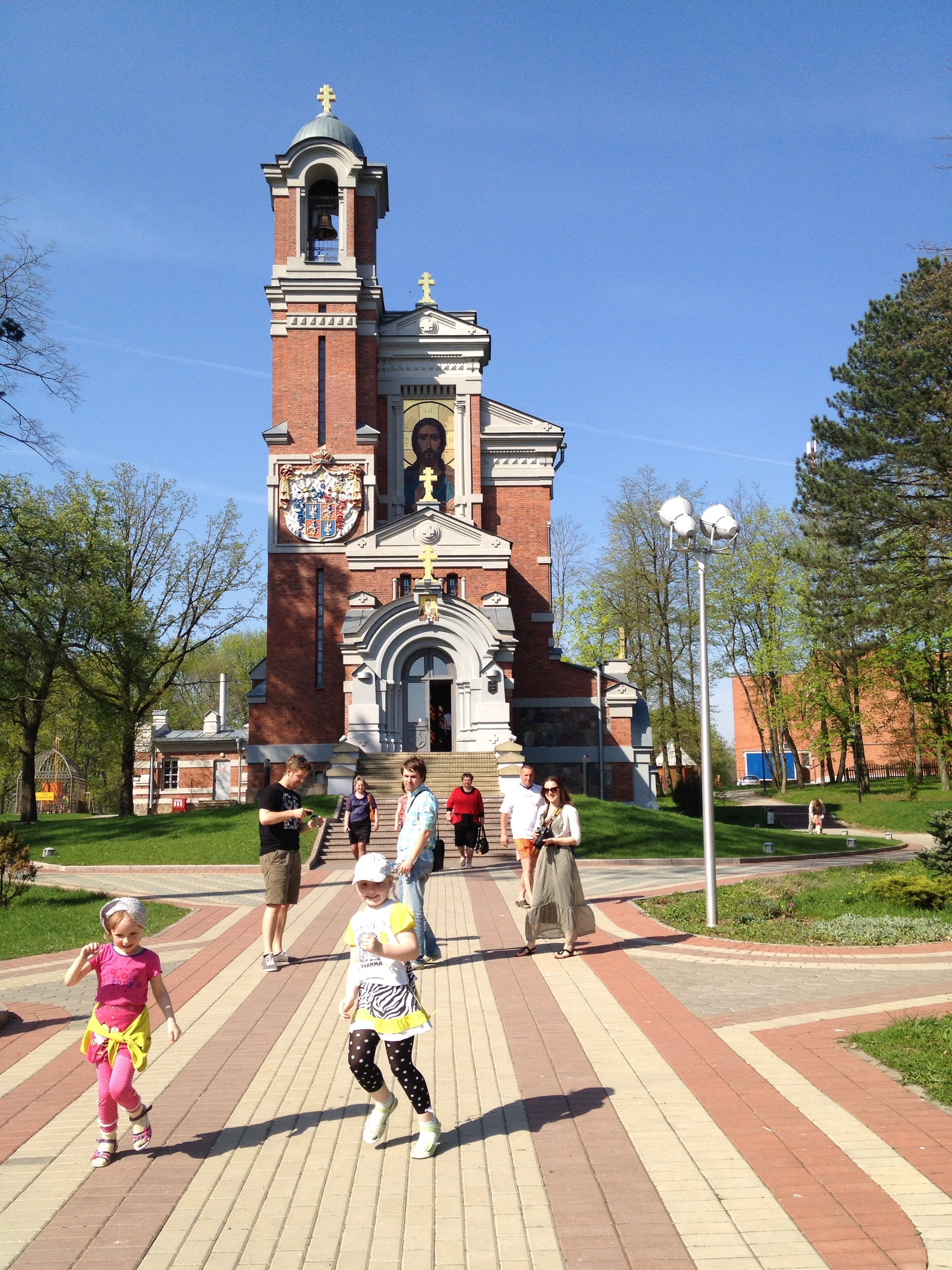

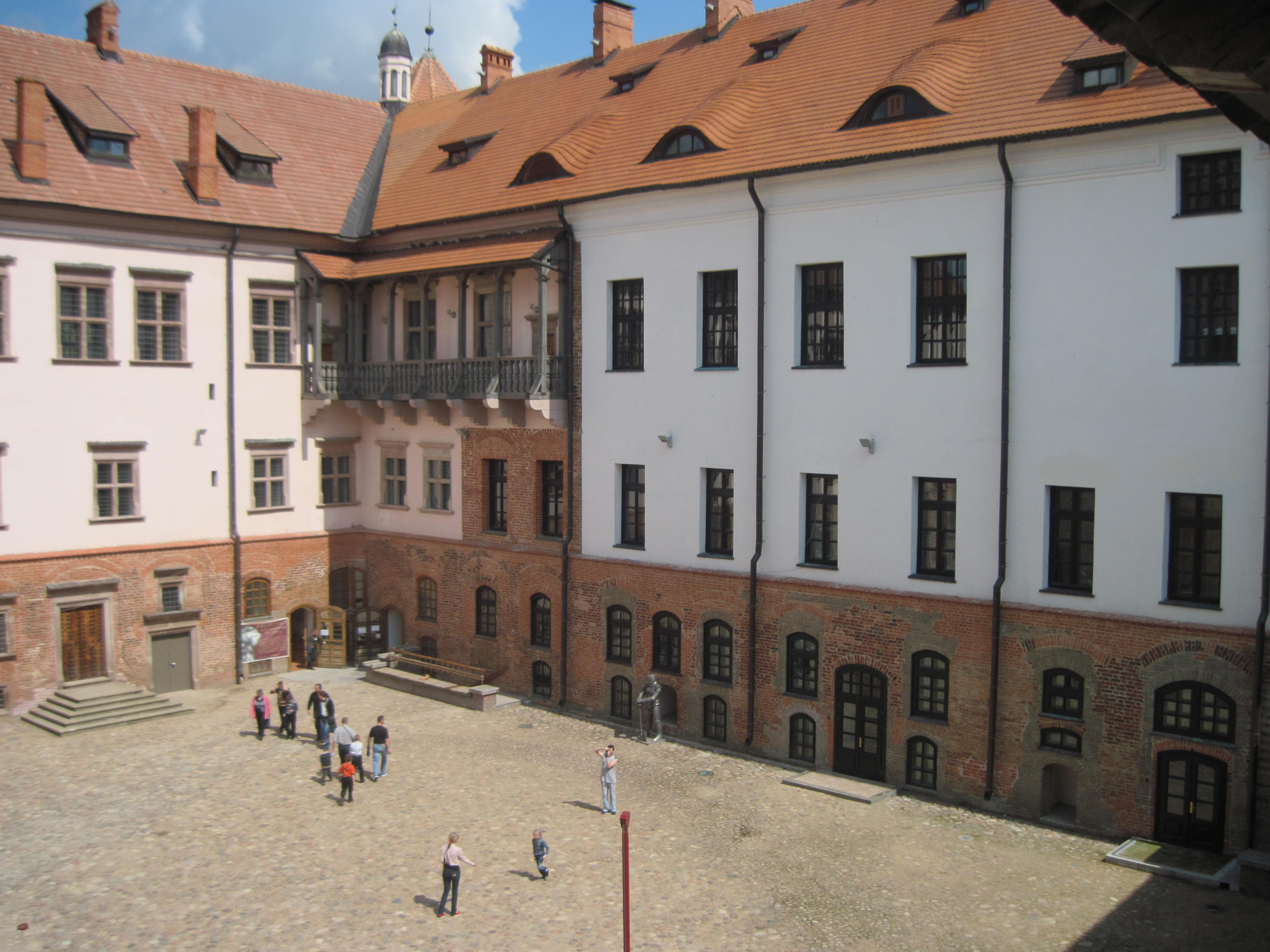

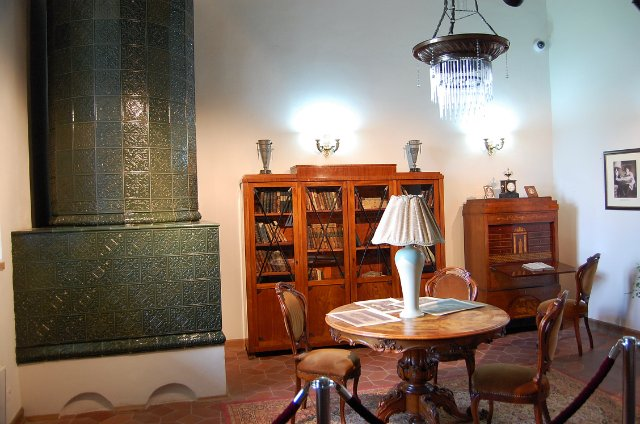

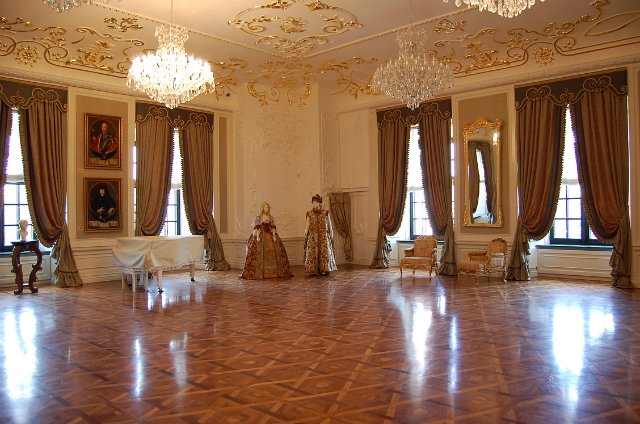

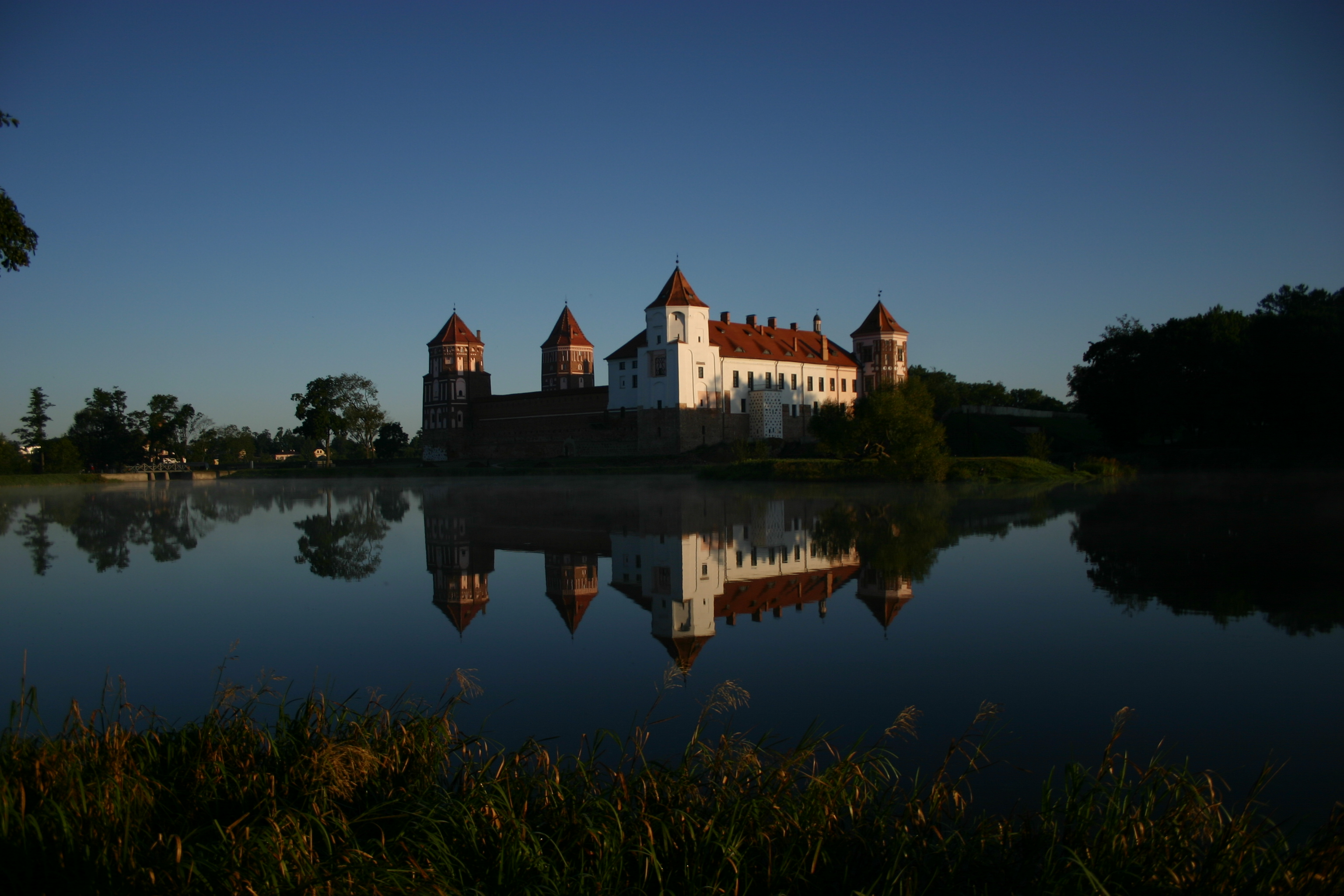

== See also ==
- Chapel-burial vault of Svyatopolk-Mirsky family
