= Chapel-burial vault of Svyatopolk-Mirsky family =

1904–1910 Orthodox chapel-burial vault in Mir, Belarus

- Chapel-burial vault of Svyatopolk-Mirsky family
- Екатерининский собор
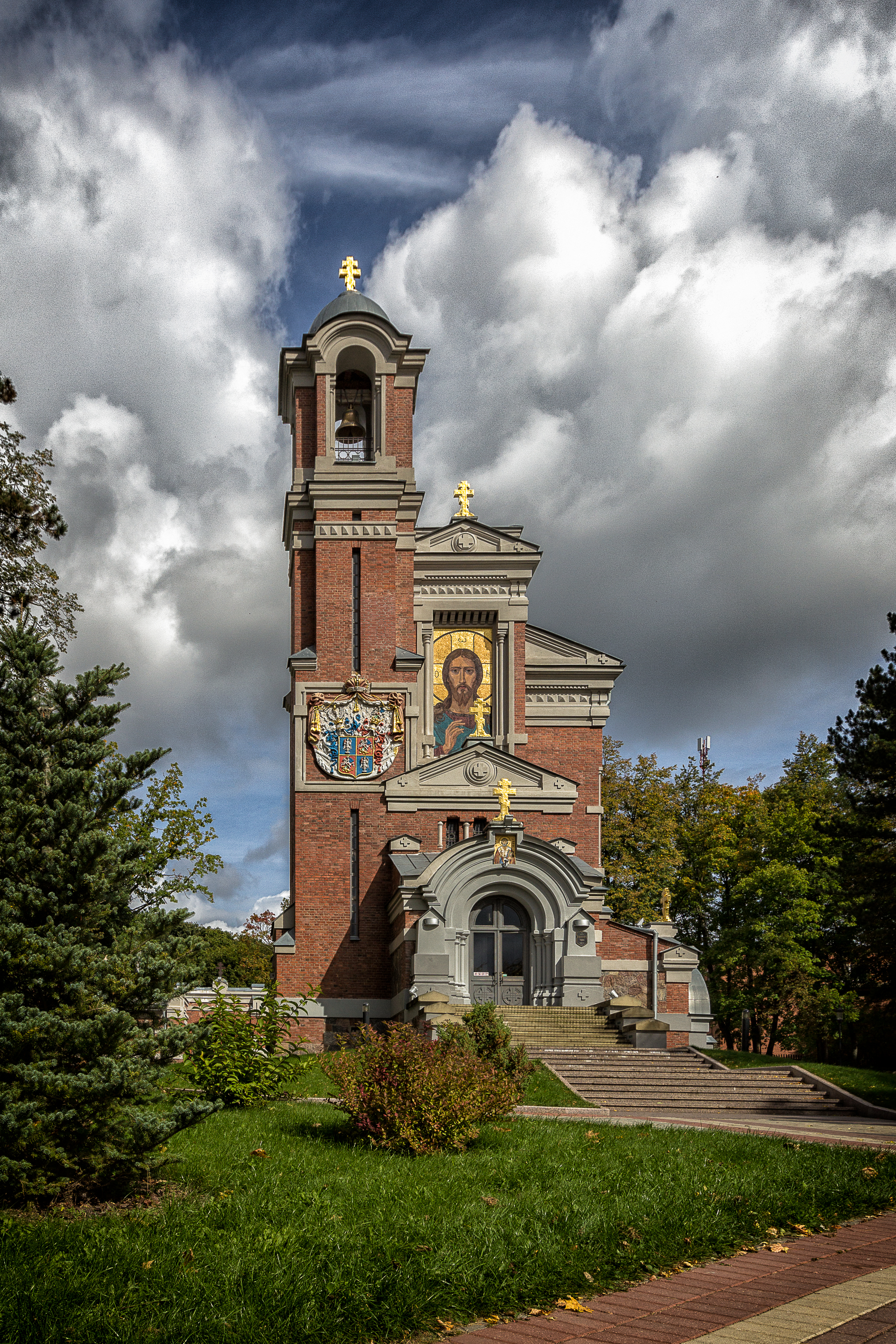
- Chapel-burial vault of Svyatopolk-Mirsky family
- 53.2705°N 26.2831°E
- Location: Mir, Belarus
- Country: Belarus
- Denomination: Eastern Orthodox Church

History
- Founded: 1904
- Founder: C. M. Svyatopolk-Mirskaya

Architecture
- Functional status: Active
- Architect: Robert Marfeld
- Style: Art Nouveau
- Years built: 1758-1764
- Demolished: 1930

Chapel-burial vault of Svyatopolk-Mirsky family (Russian: Часо́вня-усыпа́льница Святопо́лк-Ми́рских), also known as Spasskaya Chapel, is an architectural monument located in the urban settlement of Mir, Karelichy District, Grodno Region, Belarus, and situated near the Mir Castle within the English-style park, established at the end of the 19th to the beginning of the 20th century.

The chapel-tomb was constructed between 1904 and 1910 based on a design by architect Robert Marfeld, funded by Cleopatra Svyatopolk-Mirskaya. It was consecrated in honor of Nicholas the Wonderworker. Over the years, six members of the Svyatopolk-Mirsky family were buried in its crypt. During the period of the Second Polish Republic, thanks to the efforts of Prince Mikhail Svyatopolk-Mirsky, rare coniferous trees and roses were planted around the building. Under Soviet rule, the church's property was looted, with some items transferred to a nearby church. Post-war, the chapel served as a grain storage for a distillery. It fell into disrepair until restoration work began in 2004, completed by December 1, 2008, when the chapel reopened to visitors. In 2014, the first services were held: a memorial service and a Divine Liturgy.

Most researchers classify the chapel-tomb as Art Nouveau. Its dynamically asymmetrical composition was innovative for its time. The structure comprises a narthex, chapel hall, apse, and the dominant feature — a tall bell tower. The tomb is both plastically and coloristically rich. Notable elements include the Svyatopolk-Mirsky family cartouche and a large mosaic panel depicting Christ Pantocrator. The latter dominates the chapel's appearance. Internally, the building has two levels: a crypt and a hall for services. The chapel also serves as a minor architectural feature within Mirsky Park.

The Svyatopolk-Mirsky Chapel-Tomb is part of the Mir Castle and Park Complex, which was added to the UNESCO World Heritage List in 2000. The mosaic panel is separately listed in the State List of Historical and Cultural Values of the Republic of Belarus.

== History ==
The chapel-tomb was designed by St. Petersburg architect Robert Marfeld, who never visited Mir. A sketch dated 1901 was published in 1902 by Gavriil Baranovsky in his Architectural Encyclopedia of the Second Half of the 19th Century. On August 24, 1902, the project was approved by the Construction Department of the Minsk Governorate Administration. Some researchers suggest Marfeld, demonstrating boldness as a composer and stylist, aimed to echo the medieval Mir Castle through upward aspiration, Gothic brickwork, red brick color, and the texture and color of the stone used for the plinth. Art historians propose that the overarching goal was to create an "intra-family symbol of noble origin and aristocracy" for the patrons, resulting in a chapel that reached the scale of a small church.

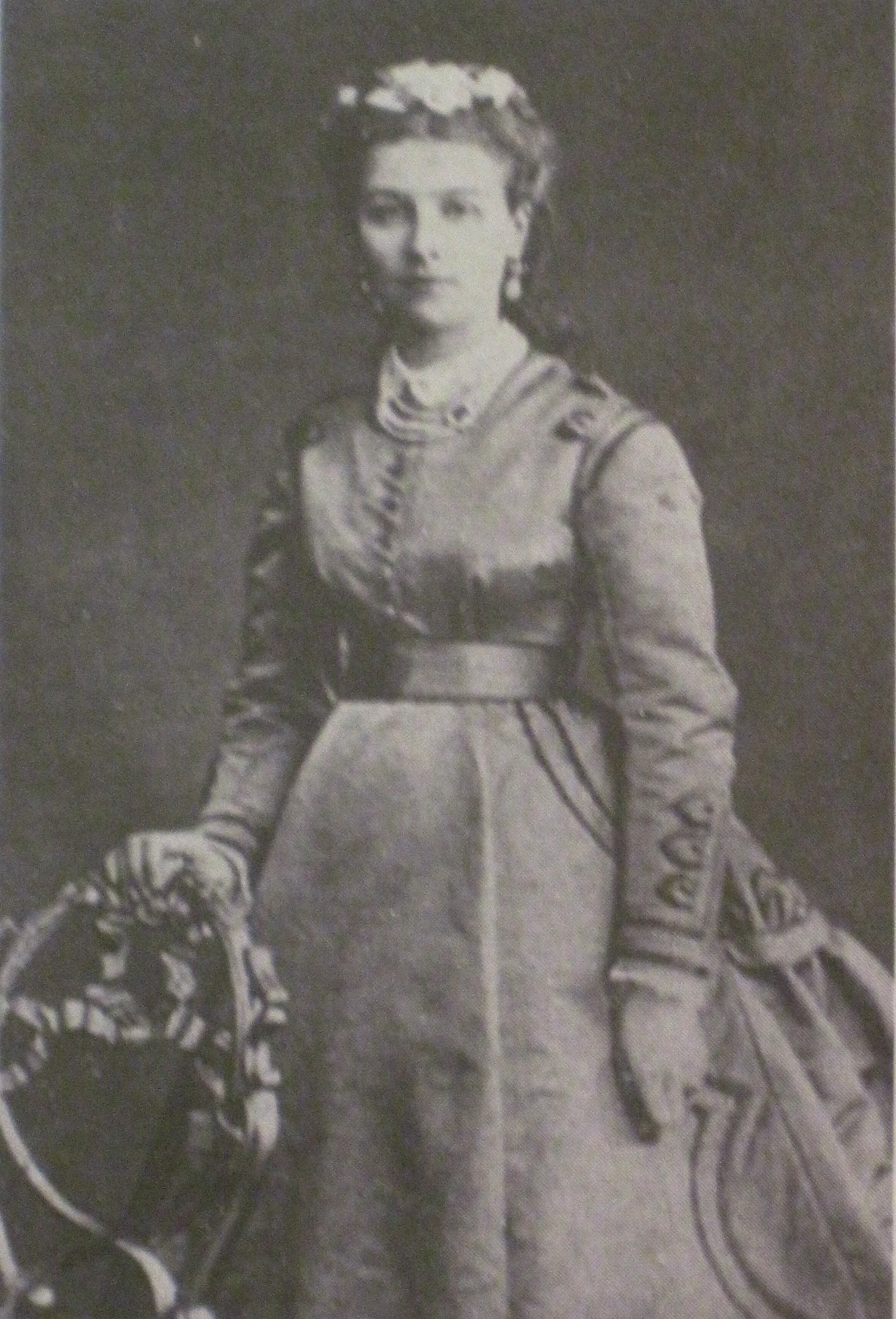
Cleopatra Svyatopolk-Mirskaya

Construction was funded by Princess Cleopatra Mikhailovna Svyatopolk-Mirskaya. (Note: I. Iodkovsky believes that the chapel was built by Prince N. Sviatopolk-Mirsky. See: Iodkovsky I. Castle in Mir // Antiquities. Proceedings of the Commission for the Preservation of Ancient Monuments. М., 1915. V. 6. P. LXX.) Building began in 1904. (Note: Some sources mention only 1901 (Kalnin V. V. Mir Castle. Minsk: Polymya, 1986. P. 32.) or 1904 (Kulagin A. M. Kulagin. M. Orthodox churches of Belarus: an encyclopedic guide. Minsk: BelEn, 2007. P. 279. ISBN 978-985-11-0389-4; Kulagin A. M. Mirskaya kapl. М.) Some argue construction was completed in 1911. However, researchers O. Novitskaya and L. Prokopenko, based on 1910 clerical records mentioning the "church-crypt of the Svyatopolk-Mirsky princes in the Zamirye estate", assert completion in 1910. The 1909 clerical records of Mir's Nicholas Church lack chapel references. Documents from the Holy Trinity Church archive confirm the chapel was dedicated to Saint Nicholas. This is corroborated by the 1942 Clerical Record of the Novogrudok and Baranovichi Diocese, Holy Trinity Church, Mir. The choice of saint may relate to its construction in memory of Cleopatra's husband, Nikolai Svyatopolk-Mirsky. Local residents had no access to the chapel.

In February 1910, Princess Cleopatra Svyatopolk-Mirskaya was buried in the chapel, followed by her granddaughter, Sonya Svyatopolk-Mirskaya, on May 3, 1913, who drowned in Bulgaria. Burial details are preserved in the 1899–1914 Liturgical Diary from the National Historical Archives of Belarus. The memorial service was led by priest I. Khlebtsevich and deacon Zantsevich, followed by a procession from Zamirye station to Mir and burial services in the crypt, attended by archpriest F. Stsepuro and Khlebtsevich. The reburial date of Prince Nikolai Svyatopolk-Mirsky remains unknown.

One account suggests that after Mir's incorporation into Poland in 1921, the chapel became Catholic and was used as a church. However, there are memories that indicate a procession where, on Good Friday morning, the epitaphios was carried from the church to the chapel, locally called the Princely Church, and retrieved Saturday evening. Other local memories suggest no services occurred except for bread consecration on Trinity Sunday. In the 1920s–1930s, there were at least three bells. The doors were oak with carved crosses. Prince Mikhail Svyatopolk-Mirsky maintained the chapel.

In 1922, Ivan Svyatopolk-Mirsky was buried in the chapel. In 1938, Prince Mikhail, who converted to Catholicism in the 1930s, (Note: At the same time, according to other sources, he remained Orthodox, and after the funeral service organized in the church by the priest, the funeral in the crypt was conducted by an Orthodox priest. See: Ramanava I., Mahoŭskaia I. Mir: History of the Mestechek: what his friends told. Vilnia: YSU, 2009. P. 63. ISBN 978-9955-773-20-7; Hadasevich G. Mikalai Pyatrovich Tsaruk - manager of the Zamir'e municipality in the first third of the 20th century // Minsk Zamak. Restoration Concepts and Problems of Museum Fiction: Research Conference, 16 March 2007, Mir Hrodna region / Ed. by A. Karpenka. A. U. Karpenka. Minsk: TAA “Bel- pint”, 2008. P. 163. ISBN 978-985-459-1148) was buried after a funeral in the Nicholas Church, with his coffin transported along Nesvizh Street to the chapel. Only select attendees entered the crypt, where he was buried to the right of the entrance. The identity of the sixth burial is uncertain, with possibilities including Prince Vladimir Nikolaevich Svyatopolk-Mirsky (died in Egypt in 1906), grandson Nikolai Semenovich Svyatopolk-Mirsky, or one of Prince Mikhail's aunts.

Some sources claim church property was looted in 1939, while Holy Trinity Church archives indicate authorities removed all church items in 1940. Remaining items were transferred to Saint George Church in Mir's Orthodox cemetery. On August 14, 1948, a Mir District Executive Committee decree repurposed the chapel as a grain storage for a distillery. It served this purpose for about 20 years. The crypt stored peat and coal. In October 1978, the Council of Ministers of the Belarusian SSR issued a decree for the restoration of Mir Castle and the construction of an art vocational school in Mir, including plans for the comprehensive restoration of the Mir Castle and Park Complex, encompassing the chapel.

In 1993, the chapel was still inactive. In 2000, it was included in the UNESCO World Heritage List as part of the "Mir Castle Complex". Restoration began in 2004 and continued for four years. By 2007, restorers noted the need for further studies. Priorities included restoring the interior using surviving items: the iconostasis in Beryozovka church, a chandelier in Mir's Trinity Church, and photos of the northern and southern facades showing icons of Saint Nicholas and Our Lady of Tenderness (possibly Vladimirskaya). On April 27, 2007, a bell inscribed with "Lord, remember the souls of your departed servants of the Svyatopolk-Mirsky family" was raised to the bell tower after consecration. On March 10, 2008, Belarus's Minister of Culture, Vladimir Matveychuk, approved a scientific concept for the restoration and museification of the Mir Castle Complex, designating the 200 m^{2} chapel as part of the museum-exhibition zone. Three mosaics were created for the main and side facades: Saint Nicholas, Our Lady of the Don, and Iviron Theotokos. Artists Viktor Barabantsev, Denis Chubukov, and Anatoly Chugunkin crafted them. Initially, a temporary exhibition, "Svyatopolk-Mirsky Chapel-Tomb: Patrons and Builders. History of Construction and Restoration," was planned for the crypt. In 2008, plans were made to display icons from the National Art Museum of Belarus in 2009. Monitoring of the heating system was planned to prevent damage to historical artifacts.

The chapel-tomb opened to visitors on December 1, 2008. That day, it hosted an exhibition of Minsk photographer Georgy Likhtarovich's works, "For the Consolation of People…," marking 30 years of Metropolitan Filaret's archpastoral service in Belarus. The exhibit featured 22 Orthodox churches built under his omophorion.

Restoration process

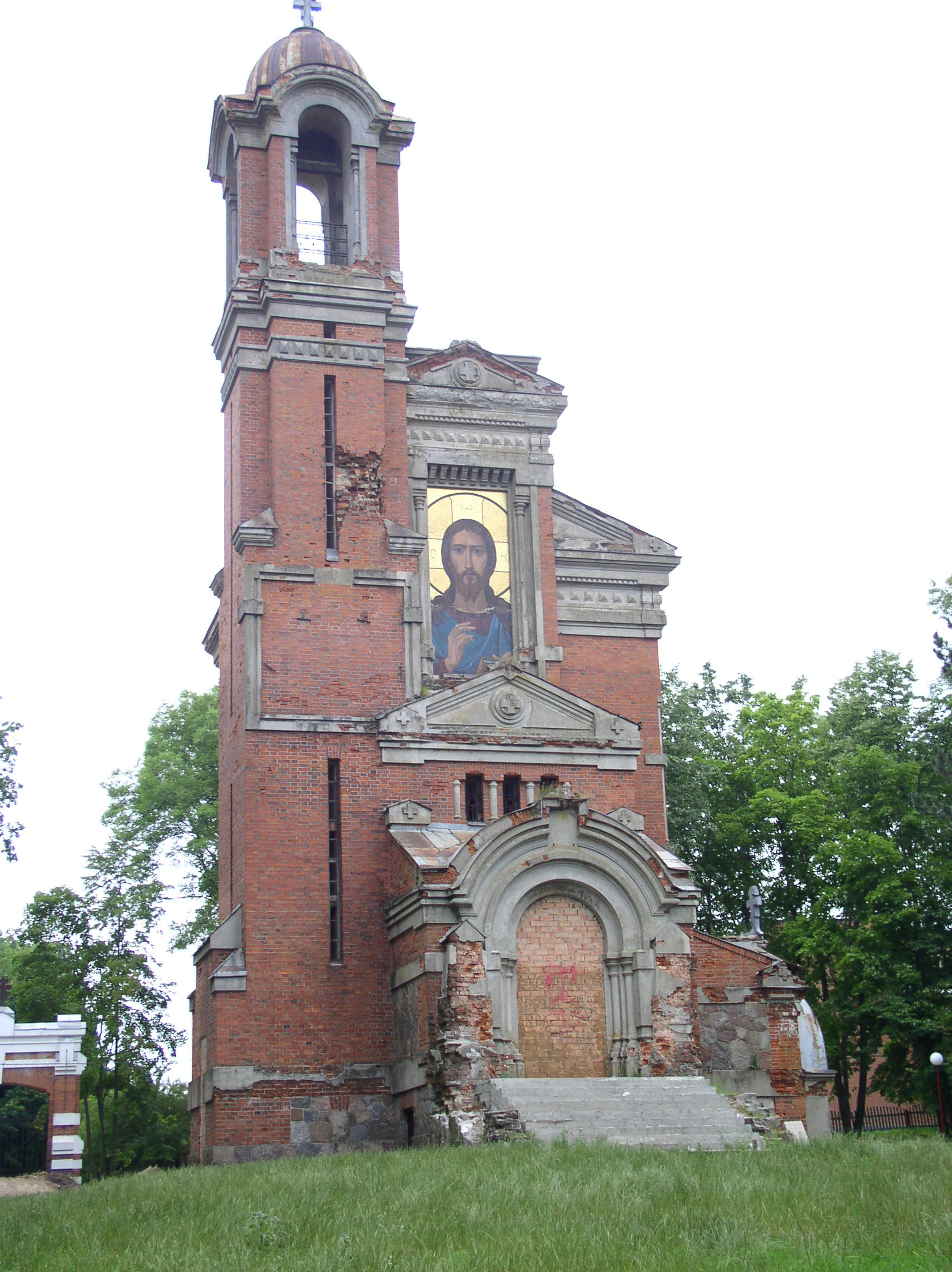
In 2005

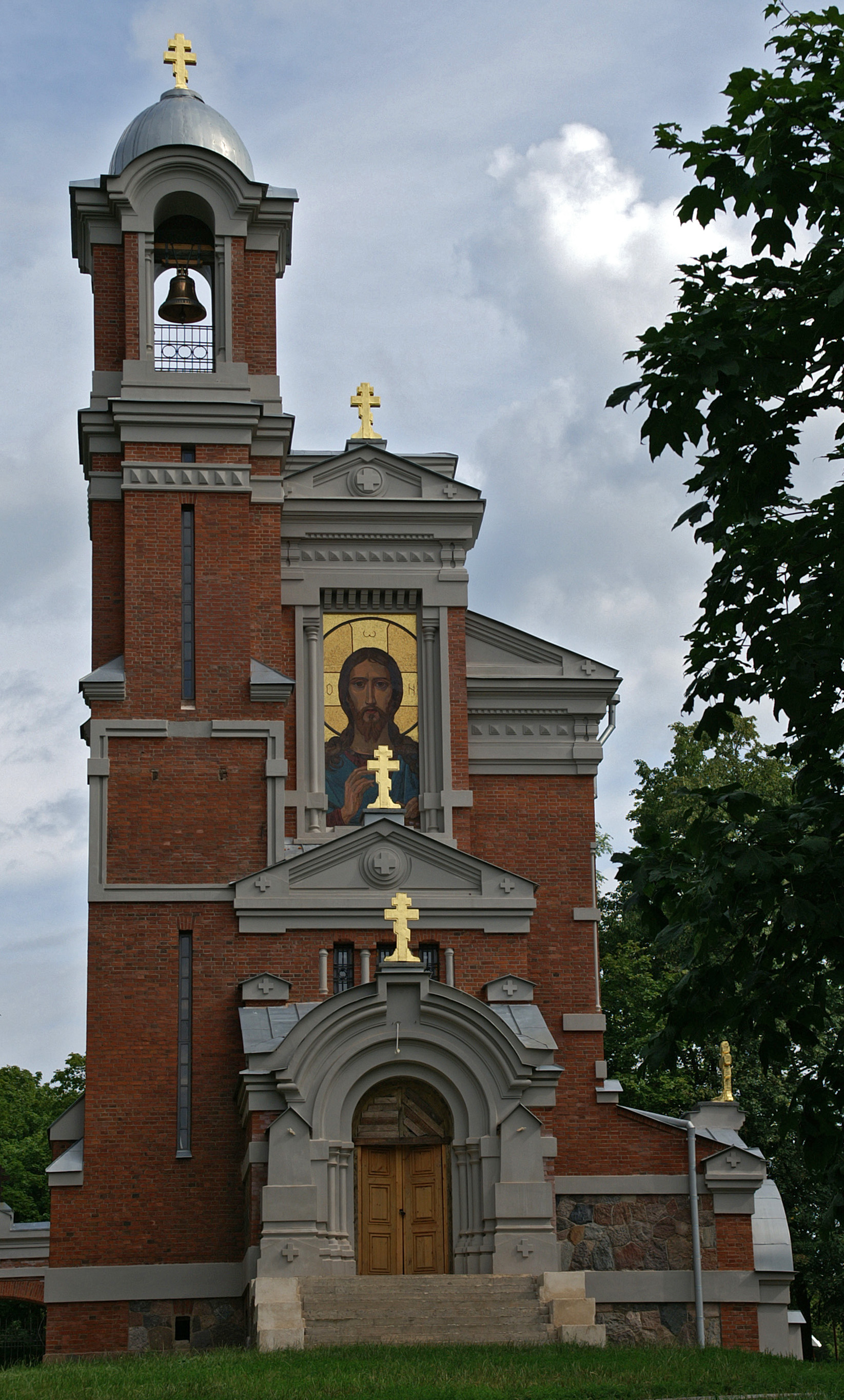
In 2007

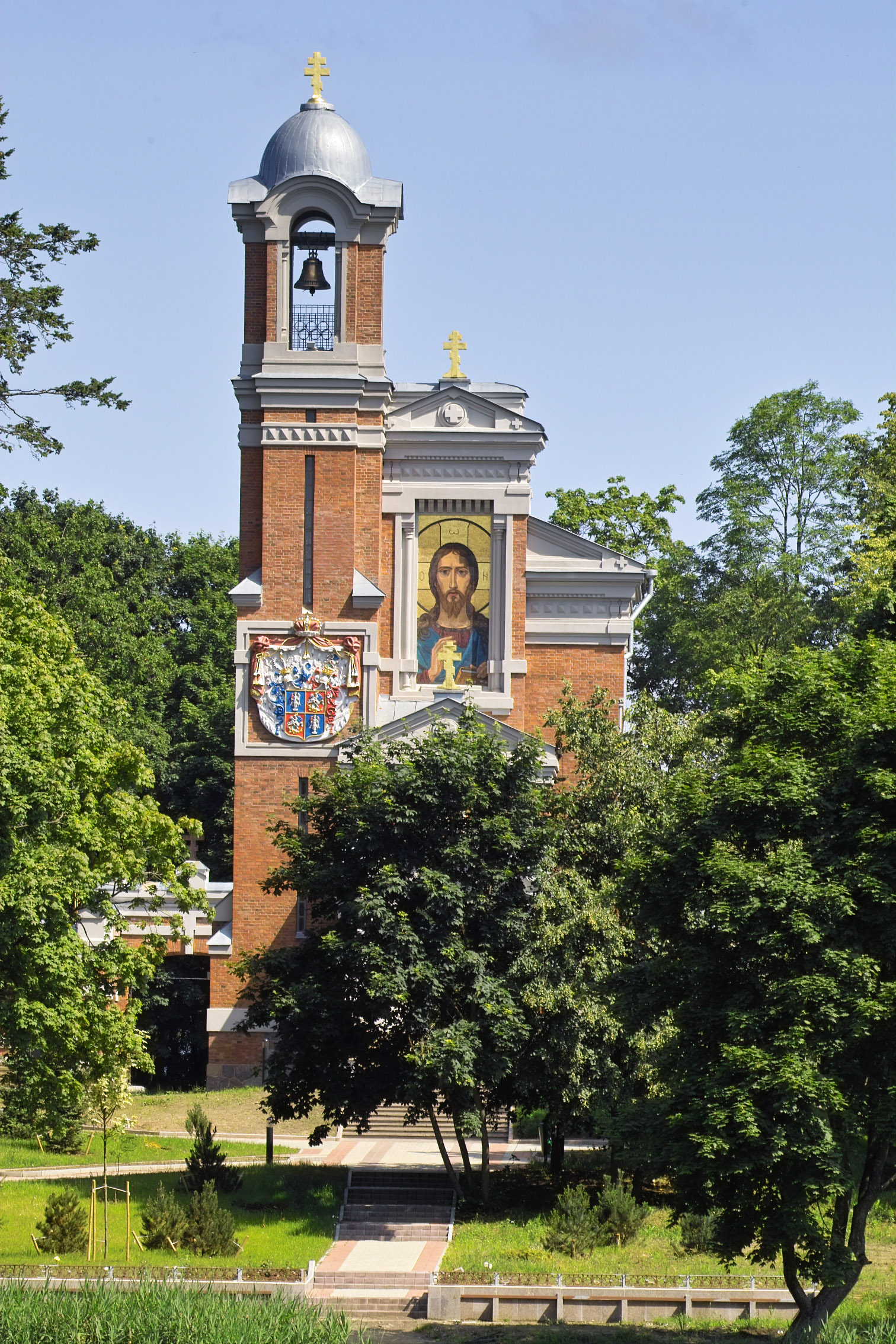
In 2009

Restoration efforts by 2009 included errors. In 2002, during rushed preparations for Belarusian Culture and Press Day, initiated by the Grodno Regional Executive Committee, ground leveling around the tomb caused flooding of its lower section. Furnace restoration was mishandled: instead of careful work with tiles and studying the masonry, furnaces were demolished. Plans to rebuild them with costly new tiles, modeled on the originals, failed to ensure authenticity.

A new oak iconostasis, replicating the original, was installed in the chapel-tomb in autumn 2009. In 2013, the original cross above the royal doors was returned. Services resumed in 2014. On March 22, during the feast of the Forty Martyrs of Sebaste, a memorial service was held in the crypt, requested by Maria Svyatopolk-Mirskaya, Nikolai's great-granddaughter, via the Holy Trinity Church's website. On May 22, the feast of Saint Nicholas, a Divine Liturgy was celebrated.

The chapel is part of the Mir Castle and Park Complex, which became an independent museum on April 1, 2011.

== Architecture ==
The building, a monument of metropolitan-level architecture, reflects 19th-century European estate culture, particularly the construction of small chapel-tombs in retrospective styles. Seeking new architectural and artistic expression, Marfeld drew on motifs from ancient Russian art and architecture (e.g., the Christ panel). (Note: Art historian A. G. Shymelyevich disputes this, arguing for a connection to classical artistic systems. See: Shymyalyevich, G. G. (2002). "Stylistic Trends of the Second Half of the 19th – Early 20th Century in Belarusian Chapel Architecture" [Стылявыя напрамкі другой паловы XIX – пачатку XX стст. у архітэктуры капліц Беларусі]. Almanac "Notes of the Belarusian Academy of Arts" (3 (2000)). Minsk: 73.) According to Vyacheslav Chernatov, by engaging historical heritage, Marfeld crafted a "distinctly individual artistic composition with an element of paradox", setting the chapel apart from canonical structures. Other art historians note:.

Borrowing pertains not so much to specific forms and techniques but to an ideal architectural style model, which he transformed and stylized in line with contemporary aesthetic ideals.

Sketches by R. R. Marfeld (1901)

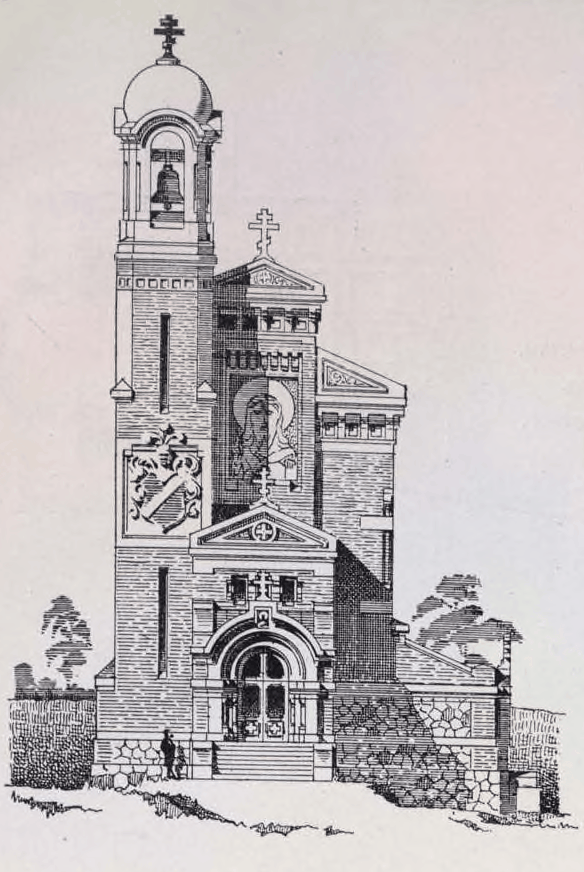
Main facade

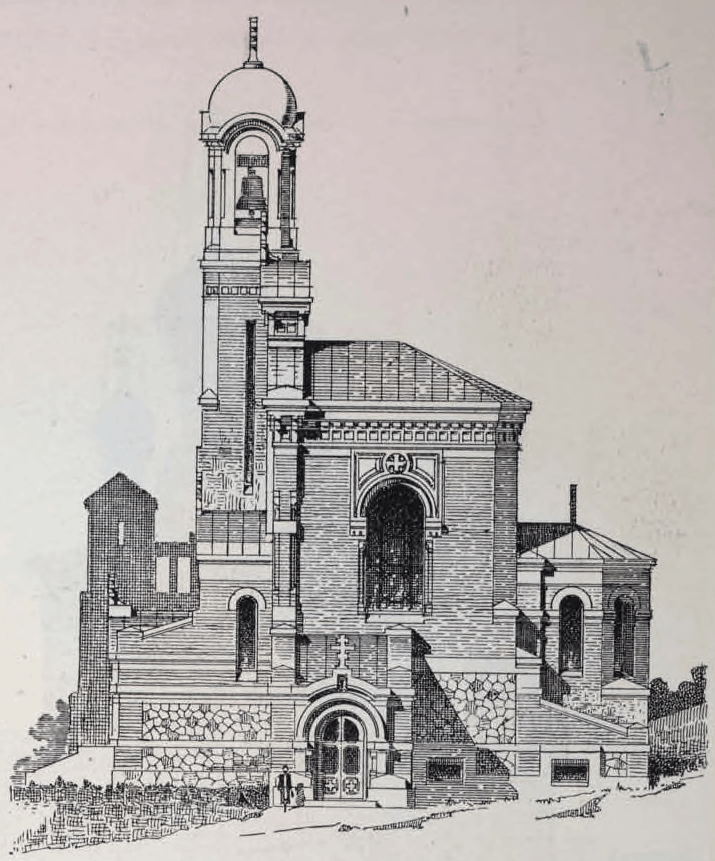
Side facade

=== Exterior ===
The chapel-tomb's innovative spatial composition is dynamically asymmetrical. Belarusian art historian Boris Lazuka notes that asymmetry is enhanced by the bell tower, with the main facade offering unique spatial depth. Anatoly Kulagin describes it as:

Elevated plastic expression, silhouette activation, internal compositional tension, and the intergrowth of masses (evoking organic growth) are characteristic features of the structure.

The main volume is a compact, vertical, rectangular plan with northern corners cut off. The chapel's heavy base, created by the main volume, is accentuated by a tall apse, two portals, and a high staircase at the main entrance. The expressive silhouette includes a narthex, (Note: Sometimes described as a low babinets. See: Kulagin, A. M. "Mir Chapel" [Мі́рская каплі́ца]. Belarusian Encyclopedia. Vol. 10. p. 468.; Pashkov, G. P., ed. (2007). "Mir Chapel". Republic of Belarus: Encyclopedia [Мирская часовня]. Vol. 5: Minsk — Pediatrics. Minsk: Belarusian Encyclopedia. p. 113. ISBN 978-985-11-0425-9.) rectangular hall, pentagonal apse (located either eastward or northward), and a tall, four-sided, three-tiered bell tower, the chapel's dominant feature. The bell tower, with a small elliptical (helmet dome) dome and open on four sides, is asymmetrically positioned at the eastern corner relative to the facade's central axis. Built over the side entrance, it features a special annex leading to the crypt. Narrow slit openings on the bell tower's walls evoke Belarusian defensive churches of the 15th–16th centuries. The narthex features a deep risalit with a triangular pediment. The entrance is framed by a robust, squat, arched perspective portal flanked by corner buttresses. Arched window openings on the side facades and apse are tall and narrow. There is also a side portal.

Sketches by R. R. Marfeld (1901)

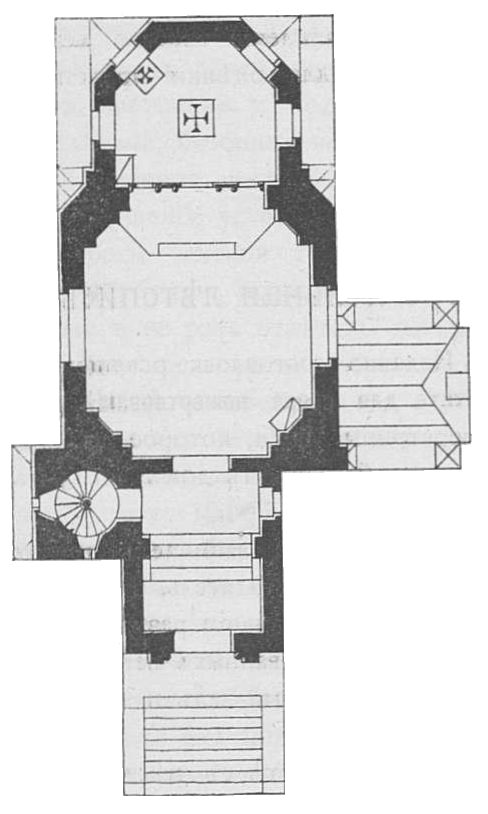
Plan of the upper part of the chapel

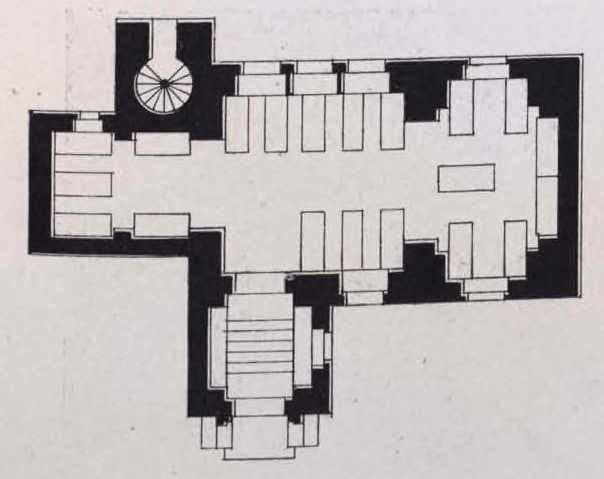
Crypt plan

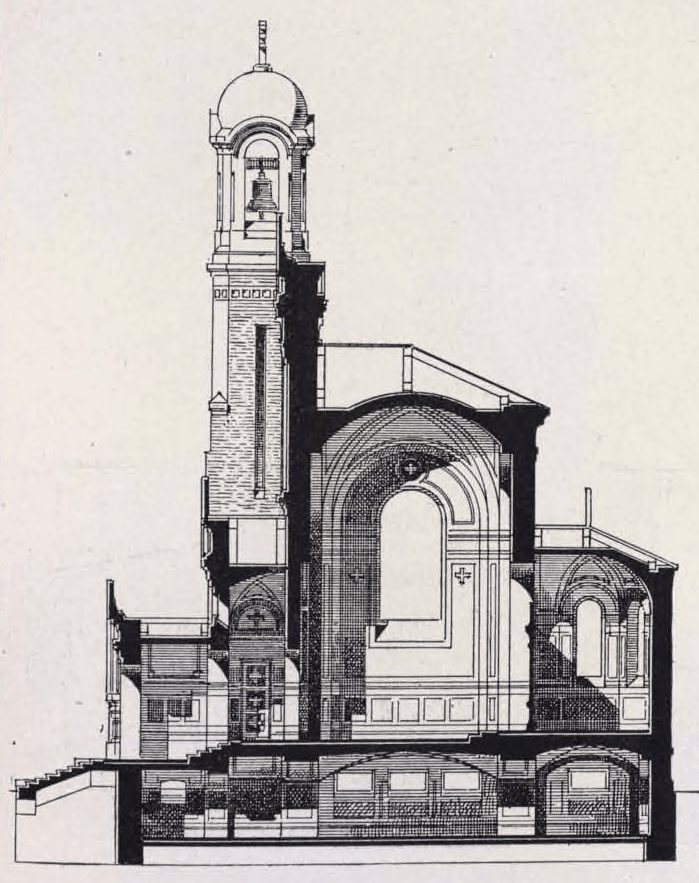
Longitudinal section of the chapel

Beyond its plastic richness, the building's coloristic solution, as described in 1986 and 1993, combines red brick, white decorative elements (semicolumns, emerald rustication window architraves, cornice with dentils), gray concrete, and polychrome rubble masonry plinth. (Note: A. G. Shymelyevich notes the plinth was clad in gray and gray-green granite. See: Shymelyevich, G. G. (2004). "Svyatopolk-Mirsky Chapel-Tomb in Mir — A Monument of Historicism Architecture of the Early 20th Century". Mir Castle as a Cultural-Historical Phenomenon of the 15th–20th Centuries: New Studies [Мірскі замак як культурна-гістарычны феномен XV—XX стагоддзяў: новыя даследаванні] (PDF). Minsk: Belprint. pp. 186–189. ISBN 985-459-040-2.) In the 2000s, descriptions highlighted high-quality red brickwork, pink rubble plinth, and light plastered decorative elements (cornices, emerald rust frieze, panels, columns, moldings, architraves). The color scheme (red brick, rubble, concrete, vibrant mosaic) harmonizes with the medieval castle, park, and water body, enhancing the site's picturesque quality. Chernatov attributes the chapel's unique appearance to a synthesis of "architecture and fine arts, modern decorative techniques," including the panel, cartouche, ornamental belts, cornices, arched portal frames, and metal grille fences with intricate patterns. Shymelyevich highlights Marfeld's ingenuity in saturating the composition with details—wide horizontal moldings, complex cornices with medallions and dentils, archivolts under the dome, pilasters (southwest corner)—noting their "retrospective" nature tied to classical systems. Lazuka characterizes the decor:

The decor — white complex cornices, dentils, semicolumns — concentrates at specific facade points, creating skillful contrasts with wall planes and an effect of increasing attention.

Opinions on the building vary. Józef Jodkowski in 1915 criticized it and the park as evidence of "modern taste's mediocrity". A. G. Varavva praises its "intimate scale," effective landscape placement, and whimsical forms. Some art historians view it as emblematic of late 19th–early 20th-century Belarusian urban development, emphasizing landscape principles and historical traditions. Shymelyevich calls it one of Belarus's "most fascinating architectural monuments" and an "avant-garde experiment," with a successful composition. Chernatov and Anatoly Fedoruk note its monumentality, integrity, pleasing proportions, and vibrant palette despite modest size. Chernatov sees it as a pioneering step toward "freedom of thought and creativity in Orthodox architecture," blending Marfeld's signature with a transition to a new system addressing complex aesthetic challenges.

The bell tower holds two bells weighing 710 and 435 kg, used during services. By 1989, only one bell remained. A new bell was installed in 2007 (or 2006 per some sources).

=== Panel and cartouche ===
The mosaic panel and cartouche are prominent, independent elements, imparting "symbolism and mysticism" to the chapel.

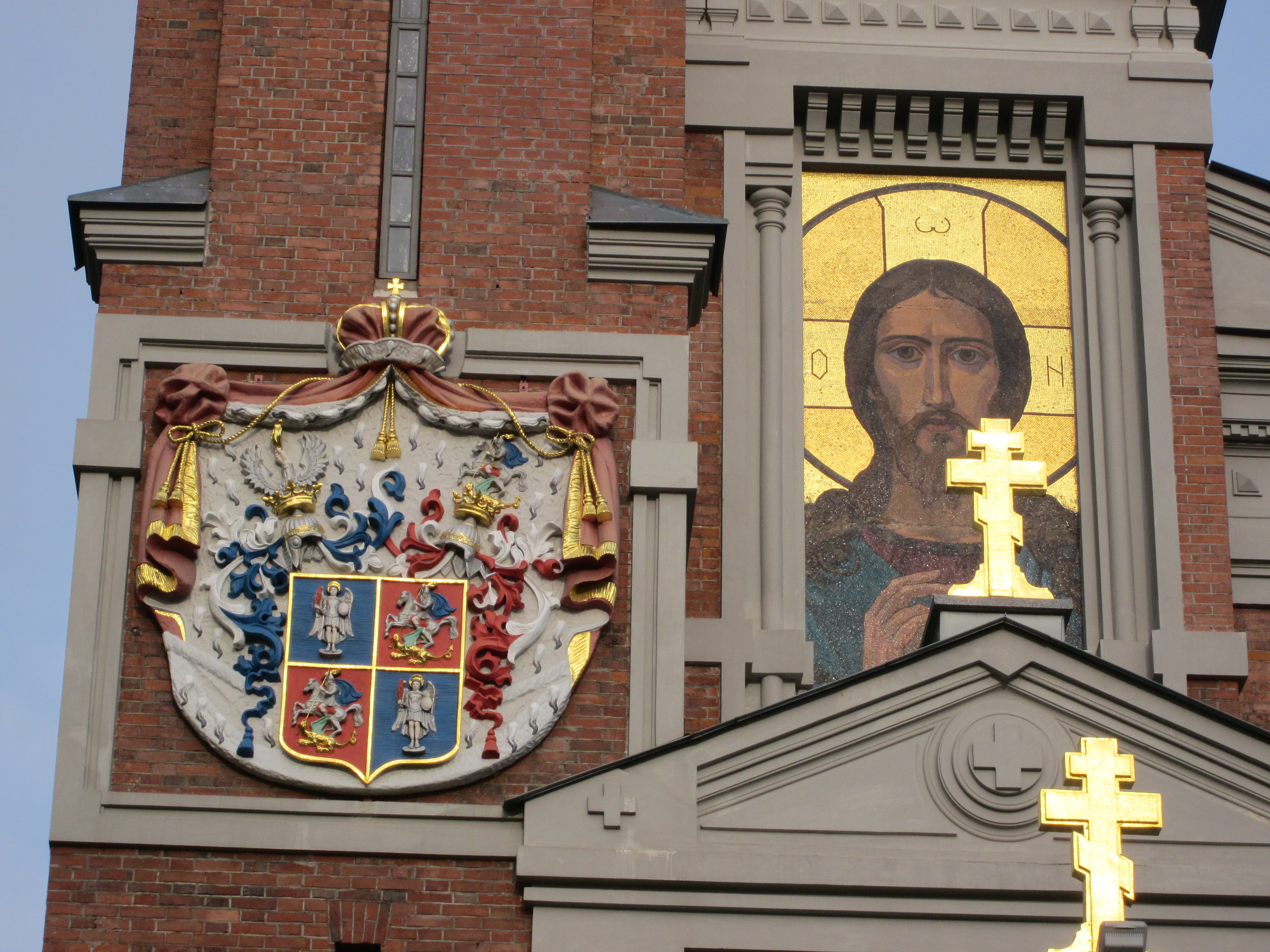
Mosaic panel and coat of arms

The dominant feature is the large "Christ Pantocrator" mosaic, placed above the narthex, depicting Christ's ochre face in a blue chiton against a striking golden background. Its bold colors were designed for visibility from afar, Shymelyevich suggests:

With certain perceptions, the entire structure can be interpreted as a vast, intricate "frame" for the monumental image.

Some claim the panel is majolica, while others suggest smalt glass. No records confirm its origin. Two theories exist: one attributes it to Vladimir Frolov's mosaic workshop in Saint Petersburg, with artist M. Kharlamov as the creator; another posits a Poznań mosaicist collaborated with local master Ivan Prokopovich Panko.

A volumetric zinc repoussé cartouche, (Note: In 1989, A. T. Fedoruk described it as "carved from oak." See: Fedoruk, A. T. (1989). Landscape Gardening Art of Belarus [Садово-парковое искусство Белоруссии]. Minsk: Uradzhay. p. 198. ISBN 5-7860-0086-9.) in high relief, adorns the bell tower's front, depicting coats of arms of ancient cities (sometimes identified as the Svyatopolk-Mirsky family crest), including Kyiv, Pskov, Novgorod, and Moscow, emphasizing the family's ancient lineage. Fixed in a square frame, it was removed by 2004 and temporarily stored at the National Museum of History and Culture of Belarus, where polychromy traces were found. A forged metal replica, depicting only Moscow and Kyiv crests, is now installed. (Note: Cartouche installation was planned for October 2008. See: Kotlyarova, Zh. (September 12, 2008). "Svyatopolk-Mirsky Chapel-Tomb to Open for Tourists This Year" [Часовню-усыпальницу Святополк-Мирских откроют для туристов в нынешнем году] (in Russian). tut.by. Archived from the original on February 24, 2016.)

=== Interior ===
External images
- Chapel interior
- Chapel hall.
- Vault with chandelier
- Chapel crypt

The chapel is divided into two levels: the upper temple, accommodating limited attendees, and the lower crypt. Marfeld's design allocated space for 20 burials in the crypt, but only six exist, one inscribed: "Heavenly Kingdom to you. Princess Sonichka Svyatopolk-Mirskaya. Born October 10, 1901, died April 30, 1913". Lost mosaics in the crypt, likely made in Frolov's workshop, were replicated by Belarusian artisans during restoration.

The hall's ceiling is a cross vault (sometimes described as a closed quadrangular vault), adorned with frescoed ornamental painting. The interior features "calm terracotta tones, strict geometric ornamentation, and purple painting". Two tall arched windows illuminate the hall. Tiled furnaces heat both the hall and crypt. The crypt, accessed via the bell tower's side, has a cross vault on supporting arches. Wooden spiral staircases connect the crypt, hall, and bell tower. Chernatov describes the interior the following way:

The interior spaces are resolved concisely and somewhat darkly, solemnly and spiritually, inspiring thoughts of the sublime and divine, far from everyday life.

=== Style ===
Scholars debate the chapel's stylistic affiliation. Some classify it as simplified Romanesque, Neo-Romanesque, or Neo-Russian style.

Most experts identify it as Art Nouveau, or note its principles. Art Nouveau traits include arbitrary asymmetry, free volume combinations, material texture (brick and granite), and synthesis of architecture and art. Lazuka calls it "‘pure' but specifically restrained Belarusian Art Nouveau". Chernatov describes its "active creative impulse typical of Art Nouveau," with Romanesque influences due to Art Nouveau's and symbolism's impact. "Brick style" techniques, seen in Marfeld's earlier works, evolved into striking early Art Nouveau forms. Shymelyevich notes the challenge of stylistic classification due to deliberate blending of retrospective elements—Russian, Neo-Gothic, and Neo-Romanesque. Medieval elements (entrance portal, massive tower, window grilles) signified the patron's aristocratic European ties, while the spherical Byzantine dome and majolica Christ panel reflect a "pronounced ‘Byzantine-Russian' character," linking to Orthodox tradition as the Svyatopolk-Mirskys were Orthodox. The chapel thus merges European and Orthodox trends. Its originality stems from combining Art Nouveau's novel forms with retrospective decor.

== Relics ==
External image
- Modern iconostasis.

The altar was originally separated by an iconostasis with "seven old icons", (Note: Per the “List of Church Items from the Former Saint Nicholas Church in the Former Mir Estate,” stored in the Holy Trinity Church archive. See: Novitskaya, O.; Prokopenko, L. (2012). "Princely Church-Tomb in Mir". In Yaroshevich, A. A. (ed.). Restoration of Mir Castle. Issues of Preserving Natural and Cultural Landscapes [Рэстаўрацыя Мірскага замка. Праблема захавання прыроднага культурнага ландшафтаў]. Nesvizh: Njasvižskaja Ŭzbujnenaja Drukarnja imja S. Budnaha. ISBN 978-985-6796-77-0.) designed by Marfeld. It was later moved to Saint George Church, but in March 1966, vandals damaged it after breaking into the church. In 1994, it was transferred to the Church of the Zhirovichi Icon in Beryozovka, Lida District. As the original iconostasis deteriorated, a replica was crafted in Baranovichi's "Paksbor" workshop and installed in autumn 2009. Icons were painted by A. Vakulich, Yu. Piskun, and S. Samusenko.

In October 2013, sculptor Vladimir Slobodchikov returned the original cross above the royal doors, discovered in 1975 and preserved. Likely mechanically made, it dates to the early 20th century and requires no restoration. As another cross was already installed, it is planned for the museum's permanent exhibit.

The altar's high place features a New Testament Trinity icon with a metal lampada. The altar includes a wooden altar table, prothesis, and metal seven-branched candelabra. The temple had a wooden icon case, two metal standing candlesticks, metal banners, a wooden candle box, and a regent's cabinet. A metal chandelier hangs under the vault.

== Park surroundings ==
The chapel-tomb was built in the English-style Mir Park, established by the Svyatopolk-Mirskys near the castle in the late 19th–early 20th century, near the eastern defensive castle rampart. on an elevation. As part of the park's composition, it served as a "focal point in the distant perspective from the palace" and a "minor architectural form". The park's most dendrologically valuable section is near the tomb.

Cleopatra Svyatopolk-Mirskaya prohibited tall trees between the palace and chapel to view the mosaic panel at dusk. Later, decorative conifers —black pine, blue spruce, Siberian larch, and Douglas fir— were planted on both sides. Mikhail Svyatopolk-Mirsky added numerous roses of unknown varieties. Locals recall the roses as Finnish. The clearing before the chapel was landscaped with conifers like Fraser fir, white pine, gray Douglas fir, and Engelmann spruce. Surviving species include European larch, Siberian larch, Douglas fir, and black pine. Fraser fir, Siberian fir, Engelmann spruce, blue spruce, and Siberian cedar were lost to the 1939–1940 winter freeze and wartime/post-war logging.

In Soviet times, the chapel was a key vista in the park's main and secondary walking routes, visible from the former palace and an open riverside meadow.

== Bibliography ==
=== Russian-language sources ===
- Antipov, V. G.; Belkov, V. M. (1970). "Landscape Gardening Art". Памятники природы Белоруссии [Natural Monuments of Belarus] (in Russian). Minsk: Urozhay.
- Baranovsky, G. V. (1902). Архитектурная энциклопедия второй половины XIX века [Architectural Encyclopedia of the Second Half of the 19th Century]. Vol. I. Architecture of Confessions. Saint Petersburg: Stroitel Magazine Typography. pp. XX + 500.
- Varavva, A. G. (2004). Несвиж. Мир: путеводитель [Nesvizh. Mir: Guidebook] (in Russian) (2nd ed.). Minsk: Riftur. ISBN 985-6700-20-5.
- Jodkowski, I. (1915). "Замок в Мире" [The Castle in Mir]. Antiquities. Proceedings of the Commission for the Preservation of Ancient Monuments (in Russian). 6. Moscow: LXX.
- Kalnin, V. V. (1986). Мирский замок [Mirsky Castle] (in Russian). Minsk: Polymya.
- Karpenko, E. (2008). К вопросу о научной концепции музеефикации замкового комплекса «Мир» [On the Scientific Concept of Museification of the Mir Castle Complex] (in Russian). Minsk: Belprint. ISBN 978-985-459-114-8.
- Lokotko, A. I. (2012). Belova, T. V. (ed.). Архитектура Беларуси в европейском и мировом контексте [Architecture of Belarus in European and Global Context] (in Russian). Minsk: Belarusian Encyclopedia. p. 431. ISBN 978-985-11-0684-0.
- Pashkov, G. P. (2007). "Mirskaya Chapel". Republic of Belarus: Encyclopedia [Mirsky Chapel] (in Russian). Vol. 5: Minsk — Pediatrics. Minsk: Belarusian Encyclopedia. p. 748. ISBN 978-985-11-0425-9.
- Novitskaya O., Prokopenko L. (2012). "Princely Church-Tomb in Mir". In Yaroshevich, Alexander Adamovich (ed.). Restoration of Mir Castle. Issues of Preserving Natural and Cultural Landscapes [Мирская часовня] (PDF) (in Russian). Nesvizh: Nesvizh Enhanced Printing House. p. 139. ISBN 978-985-6796-77-0.
- Prokoptsov, V. I. (2013). "Mir Castle: Issues of Restoration and Museification of a UNESCO Site". In Usava, N. M. (ed.). Мирский замок: проблемы реставрации и музеефикации объекта ЮНЕСКО [Mirsky Castle: Sources for Creating Museum Exhibits] (in Russian). Minsk: Medysont. p. 244. ISBN 978-985-7085-13-2.
- Nashchokina, Maria Vladimirovna, ed. (2006). "Chronicle of OIRU". Русская усадьба: сборник Общества изучения русской усадьбы [Russian Estate: Collection of the Society for the Study of Russian Estates] (in Russian). Moscow: Zhraf. p. 848. ISBN 5-89832-051-2.
- Slyunkova, I. N. (2009). Churches and Monasteries of 19th-Century Belarus in the Russian Empire. Recreating Heritage [Храмы и монастыри Беларуси XIX века в составе Российской империи. Пересоздание наследия] (in Russian). Moscow: Progress-Tradition. p. 616.
- Pashkov; G. P. (2007). Туристская энциклопедия Беларуси [Tourist Encyclopedia of Belarus] (in Russian). Minsk: BelEn. p. 648. ISBN 978-985-11-0384-9.
- Fedoruk, A. T. (2012). Usava, N. M. (ed.). История формирования, стилевые и планировочно-композиционные особенности парков в Мире [History of Formation, Stylistic and Planning-Compositional Features of Parks in Mir] (in Russian). Nesvizh: Nesvizh Enhanced Printing House. pp. 91–101.
- Fedoruk, A. T. (1989). Садово-парковое искусство Белоруссии [Landscape Gardening Art of Belarus] (in Russian). Minsk: Uradzhay. p. 246. ISBN 5-7860-0086-9.
- Fedoruk, A. T. (2013). Popko, Olga Nikolaevna (ed.). Старинные усадьбы Белоруссии. Кореличский район [Ancient Estates of Belarus. Karelichy District]. Minsk: Belarus. p. 174. ISBN 978-985-01-1006-0.
- Chanturiya, V. A. (1977). История архитектуры Белоруссии [History of Belarusian Architecture] (in Russian) (2nd, revised and expanded ed.). Minsk: Vysshaya Shkola. p. 319.
- Chanturiya, V. A. (1986). Памятники архитектуры и градостроительства Белоруссии [Architectural and Urban Planning Monuments of Belarus] (in Russian). Minsk: Polymya. p. 240.

=== Belarusian-language sources ===
- Antipov, V. R. (1984). "Mirsky Park". Энцыклапедыя прыроды Беларусі [Encyclopedia of Belarusian Nature] (in Belarusian). Vol. 3: Katenaryia — Nedaika. Minsk: Беларуская Савецкая Энцыклапедыя імя Петруся Броўкі. p. 488.
- Latoka, А. І. (2007). Архітэктура Беларусі [Architecture of Belarus] (in Belarusian). Vol. 3, book 2. Minsk: Belarusian Science. p. 549. ISBN 978-985-08-0872-1.
- Drobau, L. M.; Karnach, P. A. (1989). Гісторыя беларускага мастацтва [History of Belarusian Art] (in Belarusian). Vol. 3: Late 18th — Early 20th Century. Minsk: Science and Technology. p. 448. ISBN 5-343-00319-2.
- Ablamsky, V. Ya.; Charnyausky, I. M.; Barysuk, Yu. A. (2009). Дзяржаўны спіс гісторыка-культурных каштоўнасцей Рэспублікі Беларусь [State List of Historical and Cultural Values of the Republic of Belarus] (in Belarusian). Minsk: BELTA. p. 684. ISBN 978-985-6828-35-8.
- Kalnyn, V. V. (2005). Мірскі замак [Mirsky Castle] (in Belarusian). Minsk: Belarus. ISBN 985-01-0589-5.
- Kulagin, A. M. (1993). "Mir Chapel". Архітэктура Беларусі [Architecture of Belarus] (in Belarusian). Minsk: BelEn. p. 620. ISBN 5-85700-078-5.
- Kulagin, A. M. (1993). "Mir Chapel" [Мі́рская каплі́ца]. Belarusian Encyclopedia. Vol. 10. p. 468.
- Kulagin, A. M. (1986). "Mir Chapel". Энцыклапедыя літаратуры і мастацтва Беларусі [Encyclopedia of Belarusian Literature and Art] (in Belarusian). Vol. 3: Karchma — Naygrysh. Minsk: BelSE. p. 639.
- Kulagin, A. M. (2001). Праваслаўныя храмы на Беларусі: энцыклапедычны даведнік [Orthodox Churches in Belarus: Encyclopedic Reference] (in Belarusian). Minsk: BelEn. p. 137. ISBN 985-11-0190-7.
- Kulagin, A. M. (2007). Праваслаўныя храмы Беларусі: энцыклапедычны даведнік [Orthodox Churches of Belarus: Encyclopedic Reference] (in Belarusian). Minsk: BelEn. p. 279. ISBN 978-985-11-0389-4.
- Kulagin, A. M. (2000). Эклектыка. Архітэктура Беларусі другой паловы XIX — пачатку XX ст [Architecture of Belarus in the Second Half of the 19th — Early 20th Century] (in Belarusian). Minsk: Uradzhay. pp. 79–80. ISBN 985-04-0350-0.
- Lazuka, B. A. (2011). "Belarusian Architecture of the 19th — Early 20th Century". Беларуская архітэктура XIX — пачатку XX стагоддзя [History of World Art. Russian and Belarusian Art of the 19th — Early 20th Century] (in Belarusian). Minsk: Belarus. p. 430. ISBN 978-985-01-0880-7.
- Lozhachnik, I.; Navitskaya, V.; Yanushkevich, A. (2015). Мірскі замак: даведнік [Mirsky Castle: Guidebook] (in Belarusian). Mir: Музей "Замкавы комплекс Мір". p. 79. ISBN 978-985-90361-7-0.
- Mitsyanin, A. Ya.; Sambuk, S. F.; Trusau, A. A.; Krautsevich, A. K. (1986). "Mir. Palace-Castle Complex". Збор помнікаў гісторыі і культуры Беларусі. Гродзенская вобласць [Collection of Historical and Cultural Monuments of Belarus. Grodno Region] (in Belarusian). Minsk: BelSE. p. 218.
- Kunashka, V. K.; Kushner, V. F. (2000). Памяць: Гісторыка-дакументальная хроніка Карэліцкага раёна [Memory: Historical-Documentary Chronicle of Karelichy District] (in Belarusian). Minsk: Uradzhay. ISBN 985-04-0347-0.
- Romanova, I.; Makhovskaya, I. (2009). Мір: Гісторыя мястэчка: что расказалі яго жыхары [Mir: History of the Town: What Its Residents Told] (in Belarusian). Vilnius: EGU. ISBN 978-9955-773-20-7.
- Kharevsky, S. V. (2008). Культавае дойлідства Заходняй Беларусі 1915—1940 гг [Cult Architecture of Western Belarus 1915–1940] (in Belarusian). Vilnius: EGU.
- Shymelyevich, G. G. (2004). "Svyatopolk-Mirsky Chapel-Tomb in Mir — A Monument of Historicism Architecture of the Early 20th Century". Мірскі замак як культурна-гістарычны феномен XV—XX стагоддзяў: новыя даследаванні [Mir Castle as a Cultural-Historical Phenomenon of the 15th–20th Centuries: New Studies] (PDF) (in Belarusian). Minsk: Belprint. pp. 186–189. ISBN 985-459-040-2.
- Shymyalyevich, G. G. (2002). "Стылявыя напрамкі другой паловы XIX – пачатку XX стст. у архітэктуры капліц Беларусі" [Stylistic Trends of the Second Half of the 19th – Early 20th Century in Belarusian Chapel Architecture]. Almanac "Notes of the Belarusian Academy of Arts" (in Belarusian) (3 (2000)). Minsk: 72–74.

=== Polish-language sources ===
- Aftanazy, R. (1993). Dzieje rezydencji na dawnych kresach Rzeczypospolitej [History of Residences in the Former Borderlands of the Polish-Lithuanian Commonwealth] (in Polish). Vol. 2. Brest-Litovsk and Novogrudok Voivodeships. Wroclaw: Zakład Narodowy im. Ossolińskich. ISBN 83-04-03784-X.
