= Algemeyne Entsiklopedye =

1934–1966 Yiddish-language encyclopedia

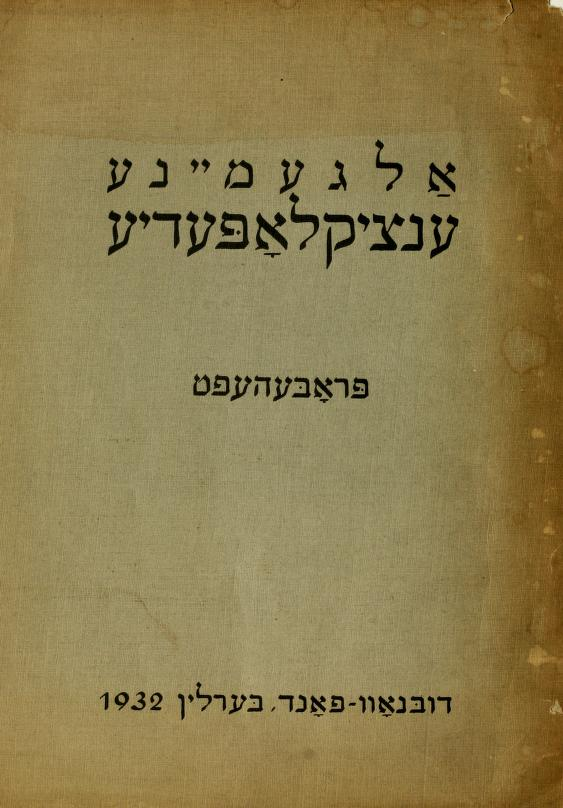
- Cover of the probeheft sample volume, 1932
- Editor: Raphael Abramovitch (1931–1963)
- Original title: אלגעמיינע ענציקלאפעדיע
- Language: Yiddish
- Genre: Encyclopedia
- Publisher: Dubnov Fund, Central Yiddish Culture Organization (after 1940)
- Publication date: 1934–1966
- Publication place: Germany, France, United States
- Media type: 12 volumes and 1 sample volume

The Algemeyne Entsiklopedye (Yiddish: אלגעמיינע ענציקלאפעדיע, lit. 'General Encyclopedia') is a Yiddish-language encyclopedia published in twelve volumes from 1934 to 1966. It is divided into two subseries: five volumes of the Normale series, covering general knowledge, and six volumes of the Yidn series (initially planned as a single supplementary volume) covering Jewish history and culture through a series of essays. The encyclopedia's early volumes emphasize leftist history and politics, although the project shifted in tone in response to Nazi persecution, and became increasingly focused on covering Jewish topics. After the destruction of Jewish communities throughout Europe—the encyclopedia's main audience—in the Holocaust, it transformed from a general-purpose resource into an effort to commemorate what was lost.

After decades of failed attempts to compile a Yiddish general encyclopedia, the Vilna-based Jewish cultural organization YIVO formed the Dubnov Fund (Dubnov-fond, named for historian Simon Dubnow) in 1930, which organized and fundraised for the encyclopedia. A large group of Jewish scholars centered in Berlin contributed to the project, often part-time alongside other jobs. The socialist politician Raphael Abramovitch served as the project's chief editor for most of its history. A small sample volume (the probeheft) was released in 1932. Its editors fled to Paris upon the rise of the Nazi regime in 1933, delaying the release of the first volume until 1934. There, they published four volumes of the Normale series and two of Yidn. The outbreak of World War II again forced the editors to flee, and the project regrouped in New York City. Financed by the postwar Claims Conference, work on the encyclopedia continued into the 1960s; the final volume, Yidn Zayen, was released three years after Abramovitch's death in 1963. Two additional volumes (one of each series) were planned, but never finished. In the years following the war, a four-volume English-language encyclopedia titled The Jewish People: Past and Present was compiled, largely based on the early volumes of the Yidn series.

Press coverage of the probeheft and the first volumes of the encyclopedia was very supportive, although it faced some ideological opposition due to its largely anti-Zionist leaning in its early years. The encyclopedia has received limited academic attention, although a book detailing the history of the project by Barry Trachtenberg entitled The Holocaust and the Exile of Yiddish was published in 2022.

== Content ==
=== Probeheft ===
The probeheft, a 36-page soft-cover sample volume of the Yiddish Algemeyne Entsiklopedye (Yiddish: אלגעמיינע ענציקלאפעדיע, lit. 'General Encyclopedia'), was first released in 1932, containing 56 entries and around a dozen images. Ten of the entries are related to Jewish culture, including articles on Hirsh Lekert, Cantonists, and the Khazars. An entry on Jews simply directs readers to the forthcoming Yidn volume. Some articles are quite short—an entry on Easter Island is only two sentences long—while others span multiple pages, such as the historian Simon Dubnow's two-page entry on Hasidism. A single color plate is included in the sample volume to illustrate the article on ceramics. Of its ten biographies, one brief article covers a woman, the Italian educator Maria Montessori. Its second edition cut three short entries and added some additional images and two longer articles. The new entries included an article on the Hebrew writer Yosef Haim Brenner, likely made in response to criticism over the lack of material on Hebrew authors in the initial edition.

=== Normale series ===
The publication consisted of five volumes, which were the following:

Volume One, published in Paris in late December 1934, contains around 1,100 entries, covering topics alphabetically in Yiddish from aleph to Atlantic City. Its contents are similar to other general-purpose encyclopedias of the period, including coverage of technological innovations, the natural world, geography, and a large number of biographies. Topics related to the political left are often written by socialist authors; one of the longest entries in the volume is an article on agrarian socialism by the Menshevik politician Petr Garvi. The preface to the volume includes a statement of purpose for the encyclopedia as a whole. Noting that many Yiddish speakers lacked formal education, the editors declared that the encyclopedia needed to serve as an educational tool in its own right.

Relative to the first volume, the 1935 Volume Two (covering from Atlantic Ocean to interference alphabetically in Yiddish) contains relatively few entries on Jewish topics, while those that do exist (such as an entry on the Wandering Jew by poet David Einhorn) are quite short. The last quarter of the volume contains entries on almost a hundred international labor movements and socialist internationals, together presenting a very detailed picture of labor history. Many of these articles were written by head editor Raphael Abramovitch, a former Menshevik leader. The first two volumes are strongly influenced by diaspora nationalism, rebuking both Zionism and the rising antisemitic movements across Europe. The following editions, released in an environment where European Jews were in extreme danger, abandon diaspora nationalism as an ideology.

Volume Three (covering "intra" to antisemitism) was released in December 1936. It largely follows the previous two volumes in content, featuring a heavy emphasis on leftist history and politics (including lengthy entries on anarchism and anarchist movements). The final article, "Antisemitism", is larger than any previous entry in the encyclopedia, stretching fifty columns and five subsections covering the origins, ideology, evolution, and organization of antisemitism, as well as its opposition movement. Unlike other articles, it was written collaboratively. Abramovitch wrote its majority with support from writers Ben-Adir (Avrom Rozin) and Tcherikower.

Volume Four (beginning with antiseptic) was released the following year. Like its predecessor, it ended with a lengthy essay, "Erets-yisroel" ("Land of Israel"), in collaboration between four authors. Although not overtly Zionist, the essay prioritizes information of Jewish activity in the region; the opening subsection on the demographics and economics of the region almost entirely excludes Arabs.

The fifth volume of the Normale series, released in 1944, finishes the last of the topics which begin with aleph, and moves on to cover most topics under the final letter covered by the encyclopedia, bet (the second letter of the Yiddish alphabet). It begins with an entry on the Roman Emperor Arcadius and ends with an entry on animals and living things. The last edition of the series in-between volumes of Yidn, it still features extensive coverage of Jewish topics, including many biographies of Jewish figures such as Ber Borochov and David Ben-Gurion. In comparison, the entries on general knowledge topics (such as Belgium and baseball) are relatively short. Although further volumes of the series were planned, they were never completed.

Many articles within the encyclopedia have bibliographies; some have none, drawing criticism from reviewers. The inclusion threshold for biographical articles is inconsistent throughout the work. While many obscure men are given biographies, only a small portion of the most notable women are featured in the encyclopedia.

=== Yidn series ===
The Yidn subseries of the encyclopedia focused on Jewish life, culture, history, and religion. Yidn Alef, released in 1939 as the first of these volumes, consists mainly of essays introducing various Jewish topics written by experts in the respective fields. Essays within the volume include entries on Jewish anthropology, archaeology, colonization, cooperatives, demography, history (divided into separate ancient, medieval and modern entries), historiography, and statistics. The 1940 Yidn Beys follows a similar format, but focuses mainly on Jewish religious and cultural matters, with articles such as a four-part essay on the history of Jewish art by the art historian Rachel Wischnitzer. Compared to Alef and earlier volumes of the Normale series, Yidn Beys featured more contributors from outside of Europe, as well as from a greater ideological range.

Yidn Giml (1942), initially thought of as the last volume of the Yidn series, features essays on Jewish literature and publications, as well as Jewish ideological, labor, and political movements. The largest essay in the volume is a 100-column article by Shmuel Charney entitled "Yiddish Literature from the Mid-eighteenth Century until 1942". The volume also includes one of the last writings from Ben-Adir, "Modern Social and National Currents among Jews", who died shortly after the volume's publication.

Yidn Daled, released in 1950 as the first volume composed after World War II, follows the format of previous volumes of Yidn. The historian Barry Trachtenberg likened the volume to a Yizkor book—a memorial book on communities destroyed in the Holocaust—as many of the essays in the book focus on Jewish communities and life in Europe prior to the Holocaust. Essays detail Jewish communities in different European countries. The largest essay in the volume, Avrom Menes's 150-column "The Eastern European Age in Jewish History", is a broad overview of Jewish history in Eastern Europe since the medieval period, while the shortest, a history of the Jews in Luxembourg, is only four columns.

Yidn Hey (1957) expands Daled's scope to Jewish communities in the Americas. Over three-quarters of the entries in the volume are focused on the United States, most of which were translated from Jewish People: Past and Present (an English encyclopedia partially based off the Algemeyne Entsikolopedye), likely including essays that were previously translated into English from Yiddish. Beside the United States coverage, Hey features three essays on Jews in Argentina, two essays on Jews in Canada, and three short essays on Jewish history and culture in Mexico, Brazil, and Cuba respectively.

Yidn Vov (1964) and Yidn Zayen (1966), the final two volumes of Yidn series (and of the encyclopedia as a whole), consist of a combined twenty-eight essays on topics related to the Holocaust. These essays, written by a variety of influential scholars (many of whom had not previously contributed to the encyclopedia), are generally organized by country. They give a history of the persecution of Jews before and during the war, life under occupation, and details on how Jews survived or engaged in armed resistance. While Vov is well-illustrated with photos and maps, Zayen lacks photos entirely, likely due to the financial difficulties of the project during the 1960s.

== History and publication ==
=== Background ===
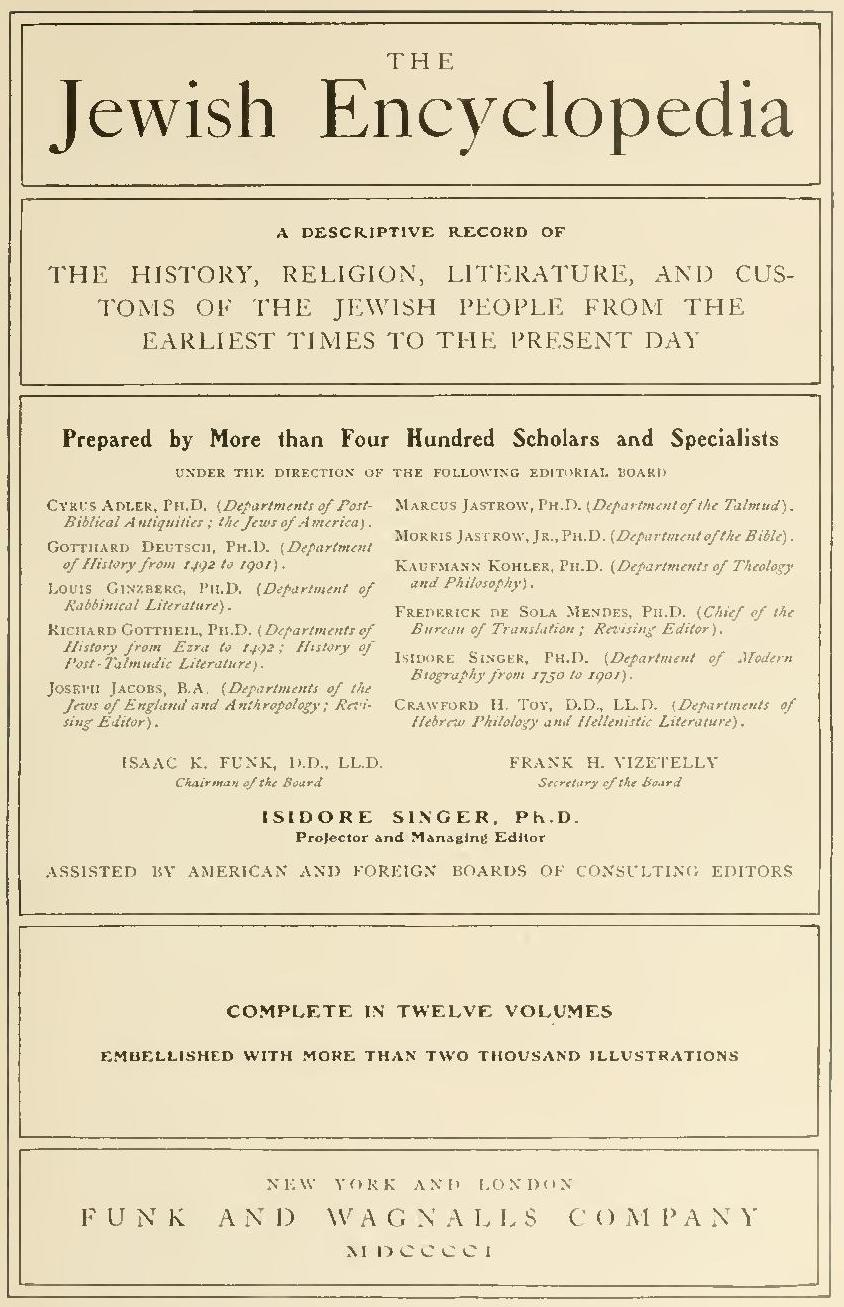
Isidore Singer's 1901–1906 Jewish Encyclopedia was the first such encyclopedia.

With the rise of national encyclopedias such as the Encyclopædia Britannica in the 18th and 19th centuries, some Jewish intellectuals and scholars proposed the creation of encyclopedias to cover the history and culture of the Jewish people. After several failed projects in the preceding decades, Isidore Singer's English-language Jewish Encyclopedia was the first Jewish encyclopedia, published in 1901–1906. The Russian Evreiskaia Entsiklopediia followed in 1908–1913 and the Hebrew Otzar Yisrael in 1906–1913. Ten volumes of an incomplete German-language Encyclopedia Judaica were published in 1928 to 1934 under the direction of the philosopher Jakob Klatzkin, roughly concurrently to another German encyclopedia, the four-volume Jüdisches Lexikon (1927–1930).

Unlike general or universal encyclopedias such as the Britannica, these encyclopedias were specialized on Jewish topics and did not seek to cover general knowledge. Attempts to compile a Yiddish general encyclopedia had been made since 1904. That year, a group of scholars (previously associated with the Russian Yiddish daily newspaper Der Fraynd) attempted to compile a compact encyclopedia entitled Di Algemeyne Yidishe Entsiklopedye ('The General Jewish Encyclopedia'), which would contain both general knowledge and coverage of Jewish topics. Only one volume of this work was made (reaching midway through aleph), as it was discontinued after negative responses from critics. Four volumes of a Yiddish encyclopedia were compiled by the editors Hillel Zeitlin and Shoyl Stupnitski beginning in 1917; this brought the encyclopedia about halfway through topics under aleph, the first letter of the Yiddish alphabet, before the project was discontinued. A similar attempt in around the early 1910s by the South African Yiddish publisher David Goldblatt resulted in only one volume which also stopped midway through aleph.

=== Organization ===
In March 1930, the editor Nakhmen Meisel published a call for a "great Yiddish encyclopedia" in the literary weekly Literarishe Bleter, arguing that the success of the YIVO, a major Yiddish academic institute, could lay the groundwork for a general encyclopedia for Jewish audiences where previous attempts had failed. This resulted in the YIVO central committee launching the Dubnov Fund (Dubnov-fond) in Berlin later that year, seeking to organize and raise funds for the encyclopedia; they named the fund for Simon Dubnow, a historian who had served as an editor for both the Jewish Encyclopedia and the Evreiskaia Entsiklopediia. YIVO co-founder Elias Tcherikower was named the head of the encyclopedia working group, while the journalist and scholar Moshe Shalit outlined a detailed proposal for the encyclopedia. The politician Leon Bramson served as the chairman of the fund.

A February 1931 meeting of various prominent Jewish intellectuals in Berlin (including Meisel, Dubnow, Tcherikower, and Shalit) was convened to evaluate the plans for the encyclopedia. This group agreed that the encyclopedia would include ten volumes on general knowledge, with one additional volume reserved for Jewish topics. They predicted that the work would take six or seven years to finish, estimating a rate of two volumes per year. At the behest of Shalit, it was agreed that only Jewish writers would be allowed to contribute. While the YIVO would administrate the project in Vilna, the Dubnow Fund would manage day-to-day operations in the center of the Hebrew and Yiddish publishing industries, Berlin.

The former Menshevik and Bund organizer Raphael Abramovitch was named the chief organizer of the project. Political and organizational rifts emerged over its development; editors, contributors, and critics debated the proportion of the encyclopedia to be focused on Jewish topics. Some suggested that 30% of the encyclopedia focus on these topics, while others (including YIVO co-founder Max Weinreich) supported only a single volume on Jewish topics out of eleven total. This dispute led YIVO to withdraw from the Dubnov Fund, although many YIVO staff continued to work on the encyclopedia.

=== Prewar publication ===
The probeheft was released and distributed to supporters of the project in 1932. It predicted the final project would consist of 5,000 double-sided pages and 25 million characters, with 40,000 entries (Note: Including terms directing to another article) ranging from lengthy articles to short descriptions and translations. This was less than most general encyclopedias in other languages, which typically ranged from 160,000 to 200,000 entries. A slightly larger second edition of the probeheft, published in January 1933, contained edits to existing articles.

In 1933, the rise of Adolf Hitler's regime in Germany forced the editors of the encyclopedia to flee the country. A core group of editors (including Abramovitch and Tcherikower) had regrouped the Dubnov Fund in Paris, although some contributors had fled to other European countries. Although the organizers had enough material written for the first two volumes, financial difficulties delayed the release of the first volume to December 1934. To reduce the cost of printing runs, the encyclopedia was reorganized into twenty smaller volumes—the Normale series—and a supplementary volume on Jewish topics entitled Yidn. The last volume of Normale was predicted to release in 1941.

Although the fund predicted four volumes per year, only one was released every year from 1934 to 1937. Volume Two was released in 1935, Volume Three in 1936, and Volume Four in 1937. The Dubnov Fund experienced severe funding issues in 1936, impairing work. They were denied bank loans and attempted to solicit donations from their contacts in the United States. The fund considered printing Volume Three in Belgium, where printing costs were lower than in France, but ultimately decided against this. In 1939, the Yidn alef supplementary volume was released, stated as an "enlightening of the sum of Jewish problems that matter to the day-to-day Jewish man and which he can find in no other place". The volume featured material covering Jewish organizations, statistics, and history. A second volume of the supplement was announced, which would cover cultural and religious topics. Trachtenberg described the encyclopedia as functioning as a "make-work project" for its editors and contributors. The poet Sholem Schwarzbard was employed for the encyclopedia, lending it greater prestige and credence among the Jewish left.

=== Publication in America ===
The outbreak of World War II again forced editors to flee in 1940, immediately after Yidn Beys was published. Most copies, roughly a thousand, of the original run of this volume were lost—possibly due to a German U-boat attack on the ship carrying them—but a small number arrived in the United States and Canada and were reprinted. They bore a preface noting their publication amidst a "fury of global war". Many editors and contributors settled in New York City, with organizational and publishing work carried on by the Central Yiddish Culture Organization. The refugee editors had brought with them the manuscript for Yidn Giml, along with a small number of the fund's administrative documents. Most administrative and financial records were lost, as was the stockpile of around 12,000 books from previous volumes of the encyclopedia. The prior volumes were republished in New York.

Yidn Giml was published in 1942, followed by another installment of the Normale series in 1944. This was the fifth and final such volume, released nine years after the previous Normale volume. The dwindling editorial corps (multiple editors, including Tcherikower, had died in New York) and the mass killing of the encyclopedia's readership forced an increasing turn away from general knowledge towards fully capturing Jewish culture, religion, and history for future generations. Many contributors still in Europe were killed during the Holocaust, including Dubnow and the linguist Noach Pryłucki. The encyclopedia's intended audience, Yiddish communities in Eastern Europe, was destroyed. Surviving Yiddish speakers were distributed into diaspora communities around the world, and use of the language declined as these communities adopted the dominant language of their resident countries, reducing the demand for the encyclopedia in the decades after the war.

During the late 1940s, focus shifted towards a four-volume English version of the encyclopedia entitled Jewish People: Past and Present, which had been initially conceived before the war. This version, although heavily based on the first three Yidn volumes, was not a direct translation. Its main editors included the historian Salo W. Baron and Rabbi Mordechai Kaplan. The first postwar volume of the Yiddish edition was released in 1950. Financed by the Claims Conference, three more followed, released in 1957, 1964, and 1966. During the 1950s, plans were made to restart the alphabetical Normale series under the direction of Hebraist Simon Rawidowicz, but refocused entirely towards Jewish topics. However, he died in 1957, soon after taking up the post as editor-in-chief of the volumes, and they were never completed. Abramovitch died in 1963, and administration of the project passed to Iser Goldberg, a labor activist who had previously directed sales of the encyclopedia. Two additional volumes—a sixth volume of the Normale series and a Yidn volume on Israel—were planned but never finished.

== Contributors ==
Contributors to the encyclopedia worked part-time on the project and struggled to support themselves financially. In order to support themselves while they worked on the encyclopedia, many had additional jobs as teachers, journalists, or writers. Contributors spanned the political spectrum—generally communists or Zionists—although political participation was even wider for the Yidn volumes. The anarchist Alexander Berkman drafted an article on anarchism for the first volume of the encyclopedia; this was rejected by the editors as overly political.

- Raphael Abramovitch, Menshevik politician
- H. G. Adler, writer
- Chil Aronson, art critic
- Grigori Aronson, political organizer
- Salo Baron, historian
- Mordechai Wolff Bernstein, journalist and writer
- Yankev Botoshansky, writer
- Leon Bramson, politician
- Julius Brutzkus, historian and politician
- Nathan Chanin, labor organizer
- Daniel Charney, journalist
- Shmuel Charney, literary critic
- Boaz Cohen, Talmudist
- Simon Dubnow, writer and activist
- David Einhorn, poet and journalist
- Filip Friedman, historian
- Joseph Gar, historian
- Petr Garvi, Menshevik politician
- Abraham Golomb, educator and writer
- Shloyme Gilinsky, educator
- Liebmann Hersch, demographer
- Raul Hilberg, historian
- Alice Jacob-Loewenson, pianist and music critic
- Judah Joffe, philologist
- Samuel Kahan (Franz Kursky), Bundist organizer
- Zelig Kalmanovich, historian and philologist
- Adolf Kobler, rabbi and historian
- Mordecai Kosover, journalist and librarian
- Jacob Lestschinsky, demographer and statistician
- Claude Lévi-Strauss, anthropologist
- Elye Lipiner, writer and journalist
- Tuvye Mayzel, activist and Bundist
- Avrom Menes, historian and Bundist
- N. B. Minkoff, writer and activist
- Michael Molho, editor, rabbi, and scholar
- Alexander Mukdoni, theater critic
- Léon Poliakov, historian
- Noach Pryłucki, linguist and folklorist
- Leyzer Ran, historian
- Simon Rawidowicz, Hebraist and philosopher
- Zalman Reisen, lexicographer and literary historian
- Avrom Regelson, poet
- Abraham Revusky, writer
- Shmuel Rozansky, writer
- Louis Rosenberg, demographer
- Avrom Rozin (Ben-Adir), demographer and socialist
- Arthur Ruppin, Zionist activist and sociologist
- Gershom Scholem, philosopher
- Aharon Leib Schussheim, journalist and activist
- Sholem Schwarzbard, poet and assassin
- Isaac Schwarzbart, Zionist activist and politician
- Jacob Shatzky, historian
- Leyb Shpizman, journalist
- Louis Sigal, labor organizer
- Aaron Steinberg, activist and translator
- Isaac Steinberg, socialist politician and lawyer
- Eleazar Sukenik, archaeologist
- Aryeh Tartakower, politician and historian
- Elias Tcherikower, historian
- Riva Tcherikower, wife of Elias
- Victor Tcherikover, historian
- Joseph Tenenbaum, activist, writer, and urologist
- Isaiah Trunk, archivist and historian
- Max Weinreich, linguist
- Sam Weiss, socialist organizer
- Mark Wischnitzer, historian
- Rachel Wischnitzer, architect and art historian
- Chaim Zhitlowsky, philosopher
- Szmul Zygielbojm, politician

== Reception and legacy ==
Critical reception to the Algemeyne Entsiklopedye in the Yiddish press began after the publication of its probeheft in 1932. Encyclopedia contributor and poet Daniel Charney celebrated the probeheft, writing in a New York literary magazine, "If the forthcoming Yiddish encyclopedia will indeed have this elegant an appearance [...] we will really not have anything to be ashamed of in comparison to the other nations of the world." The journalist Yeshayahu Klinov noted the great potential for the project, writing that if completed, the encyclopedia would "justify our entire Eastern European Jewish Diaspora in Berlin" but questioned whether ten volumes would be enough to provide a proper overview of general knowledge. Klinov, a committed Zionist, criticized the encyclopedia's ideological direction, disliking that the article on the Zionist leader Max Nordau was written by the anti-Zionist socialist Ben-Adir. Press coverage of the first full volume was extremely supportive, with many hailing the project as a landmark in the history of Yiddish literary culture.

The editorial staff of the encyclopedia had grown increasingly sympathetic towards Zionism over the course of its production, but faced criticism from Zionist academics, such as the historian Bernard Dov Weinryb. Weinryb criticized the Yidn editions' focus on the culture of the diaspora over the growing Jewish community in Palestine, calling on the editors to recognize that most readers would be "more or less sympathetic toward Hebrew and Zionism or, in any case, not opposed to the movement".

Koppel Pinson, an American historian, praised the Yidn volumes while critiquing the last volume of the Normale series for what he described as poor editorial policy, writing that the encyclopedia's selection of historical figures for biographical articles appeared arbitrary and inconsistent. Pinson noted that biographies of historical figures such as Henry Ward Beecher and Dieterich Buxtehude were absent, as well as coverage of Jewish figures such as Marcus Elieser Bloch. The historian Nachman Blumental criticized a variety of historical inaccuracies and errors regarding Jewish ghettos in the final Yidn volume, as well as hedging and other informalities.

The encyclopedia has received limited academic attention. In 2022, Barry Trachtenberg published a history of the Algemeyne Entsiklopedye entitled The Holocaust and the Exile of Yiddish.

== Notes ==
=== Bibliography ===
- Blumental, Nachman (1966). "The General Encyclopedia in Yiddish and the Holocaust". Yad Vashem Bulletin (18): 26–30.
- Ivry, Benjamin; Trachtenberg, Barry (March 7, 2022). "How a Yiddish Encyclopedia Became a Document of the Holocaust and Jewish Culture". The Forward.
- Krutikov, Michael (April 14, 2022). "די טראַגישע געשיכטע פֿון דער אַמביציעזער "אַלגעמײנער ענציקלאָפּעדיע" [The Tragic History of the Ambitious Algemeyne Entsiklopedye]. The Forward (in Yiddish).
- Kuznitz, Cecile Ether (2014). YIVO and the Making of Modern Jewish Culture: Scholarship for the Yiddish Nation. Cambridge University Press. doi:10.1017/CBO9781139013604. ISBN 9781139013604.
- Spinner, Samuel J. (January 23, 2024). "Review of Barry Trachtenberg's The Holocaust and the Exile of Yiddish: A History of the Algemeyne Entsiklopedye". In geveb.
- Trachtenberg, Barry (2006). "From Edification to Commemoration: Di Algemeyne Entsiklopedye, the Holocaust, and the Changing Mission of Yiddish Scholarship". Journal of Modern Jewish Studies. 5 (3): 285–300. doi:10.1080/14725880600961601.
- — (2010). "Jewish Universalism, the Yiddish Encyclopedia, and the Nazi Rise to Power". In Estraikh, Gennady; Krutikov, Mikhail (eds.). Yiddish in Weimar Berlin: At the Crossroads of Diaspora Politics and Culture. Routledge. pp. 195–214. ISBN 9781906540708.
- — (2022). The Holocaust and the Exile of Yiddish: A History of the Algemeyne Entsiklopedye. Rutgers University Press. ISBN 9781978825451.
- Pinson, Koppel (1945). "Review of General Encyclopaedia Vol. v, Arkadius—Baalei-hayyim". Jewish Social Studies. 7 (1): 76–78. JSTOR 4464634.
- Veidlinger, Jeffery (2009). "From Ashkenaz to Zionism: Putting Eastern European Jewish Life in (Alphabetical) Order". AJS Review. 33 (2): 379–389. doi:10.1017/S0364009409990250.
- Weinryb, Bernard D. (1942). "Review of General Encyclopedia: Jews, Vol. i–ii". Jewish Social Studies. 4 (1): 85–86. JSTOR 4615191.
- Wolfthal, Maurice (April 28, 2020). "My Biography of the World's Greatest Yiddish Encyclopedia". The Forward.
