= Karelichy district =

District of Grodno region, Belarus

Karelichy district Карэліцкі раён (Belarusian) Кореличский район (Russian)
- District
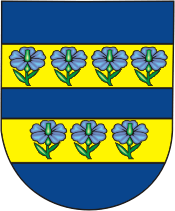
- Flag Coat of arms

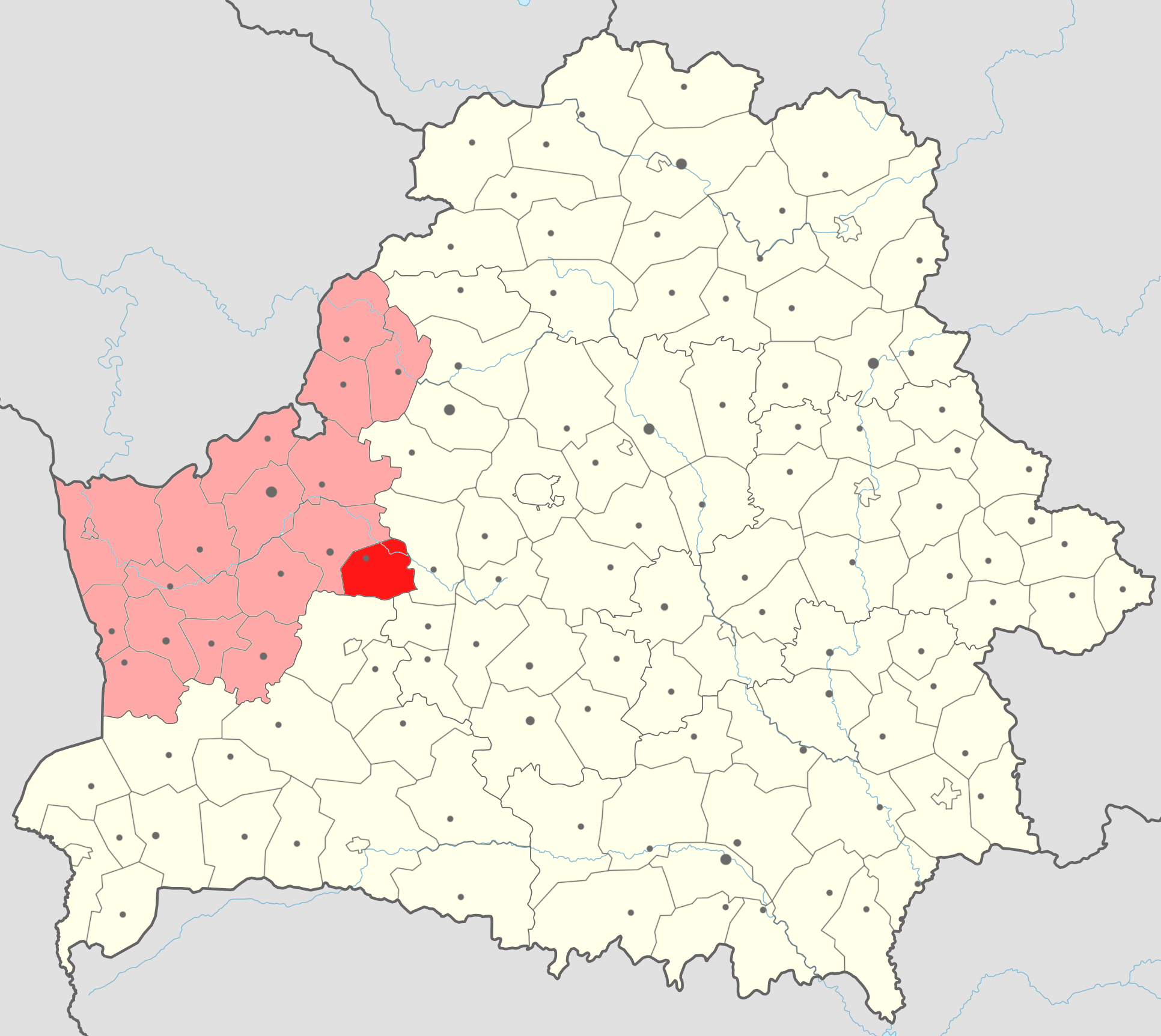
- Coordinates: 53°34′N 26°08′E
- Country: Belarus
- Region: Grodno region
- Administrative center: Karelichy

Area
  - District: 1,093.66 km^{2} (422.26 sq mi)

Population (2024)
  - District: 18,080
  - Density: 16.53/km^{2} (42.82/sq mi)
  - Urban: 7,961
  - Rural: 10,119
- Time zone: UTC+3 (MSK)

Karelichy district or Kareličy district (Belarusian: Карэліцкі раён; Russian: Кореличский район) is a district (raion) of Grodno region in Belarus. The administrative center is Karelichy. As of 2024, it has a population of 18,080.

== Notable residents ==
- Jan Bułhak (1876, Astašyn village – 1950), photographer, ethnographer and folklorist
- Ignacy Domeyko (1802, Miadzviedka estate – 1889), geologist, mineralogist, educator, and founder of the University of Santiago, in Chile
- Archimandrite Leo Garoshka(1911, Traščycy village – 1977), Catholic priest of the Byzantine rite, religious and social activist, researcher of the history of religion in Belarus and anfounder of the Francis Skaryna Belarusian Library in London.
- Barys Rahula (1920, Turec village – 2005), Belarusian political activist
