= David Einhorn =

David Einhorn may refer to:

- David Einhorn (poet), (1886–1973), Jewish poet, journalist, and essayist
- David Einhorn (rabbi) (1809–1879), leader of the Jewish reform movement in the U.S.
- David Einhorn (hedge fund manager) (born 1968), founder of Greenlight Capital
