= Wörterbuch der Kriegstüchtigkeit =

Wörterbuch der Kriegstüchtigkeit (German pronunciation: [ˈvœʁtɐbʊx deːɐ̯ ˈkʁiːkstuːχtɪçkaɪt]; the title can be translated in various ways, such as "Dictionary of War Readiness", "Dictionary of War Capability" or "Lexicon of Combat Capability") is a German-language dictionary in the making. First published on May 27, 2025, it is written by the conflict researcher Leo Ensel, whose focus is on the Post-Soviet space and Central/Eastern Europe. The dictionary consists of words relating to "Kriegstüchtigkeit " (variously translatable as 'war-readiness,' 'military capability,' 'military efficiency,' and others) followed by definitions.

According to Ensel, he intends to publish, at irregular intervals, a collection of deceitful words or phrases whose purpose and function is to quietly reshape the German society in the direction of 'war readiness': "Vocabulary criticism is the order of the day during wartime."

The dictionary is in the tradition of analytical works such as LTI – Lingua Tertii Imperii by Victor Klemperer, or Innocent Words (Słowa niewinne) by Nachman Blumental, studies of the way of propaganda in former times, and also of the (satirical) Dictionary of Received Ideas (Dictionnaire des idées reçues), compiled by Gustave Flaubert.

== Publication ==
It has been published by the website globalbridge.ch in installments since May 27, 2025, and as NDS (de)-Podcast since May 29 with "kind permission" from Globalbridge (May 27, June 1, June 15, June 21, June 28, July 14, August 3, August 22, September 3, September 16, September 19, October 4, October 14, November 12, November 26, December 6, December 14, December 27, 2025, January 4, January 20, February 11, February 21, February 28, March 8, March 15 2026).

== Content ==
The text sharply criticizes the increasing militarization of language in Germany's security policy discourse. Terms such as "deterrence," "service for freedom," or "war-readiness" are exposed as ideologically charged. A clear break from the former policy of détente is highlighted. According to the author, euphemisms obscure actual preparations for war and serve to normalize violence. Media, politics, and the military invoke "war-readiness" under a moral guise. Religious references and historical memory are also instrumentalized to legitimize military actions. Particularly concerning is the rhetoric of there being "no alternative" in light of the so-called "Russian threat." The text illustrates how language is strategically used to present war as both necessary and morally justified—a gradual shift in values with far-reaching consequences.

Sample definitions include:

- Drecksarbeit German pronunciation: [ˈdʁɛksˌaʁbaɪ̯t] (dirty work) A certain state is currently doing the dirty work "for all of us," selflessly, according to Chancellor Merz himself — by relentlessly bombing another. Something for which Mr. Merz has the "utmost respect." (A number of international law experts simply call it an "act of aggression.") (cf. "civilizational war")
- kriegstüchtig (war-capable), and not merely "ready for defense." The word "defense" is replaced by "war," and "readiness" by "capability." A word that, when spoken by officials four decades ago, would have provoked massive anti-militarist resistance—yet today is met by the majority of the population with a shrug of fatalistic resignation.

== See also ==
- Die Fackel / The Last Days of Mankind (Karl Kraus)
- The Devil's Dictionary (Ambrose Bierce)
