= Filip Friedman =

Polish-Jewish historian (1901–1960)

Filip (Philip) Friedman (27 April 1901 in Lemberg – 7 February 1960 in New York City) was a Polish-Jewish historian and the author of several books on history and economics.

Philip Friedman was born in Lwów in 1901. After graduation from Gymnasia in Lwów, Friedman studied at the Jan Kazimierz University in Lwów, the University of Vienna and the Jewish Paedagogium under Salo Baron. He moved to Łódź in 1925 after receiving his doctorate from the University of Vienna. Friedman taught at a leading Hebrew secondary school in Łódź, as well as at the People's University of that city, at YIVO in Vilna (1935), and at the Taḥkemoni of Warsaw (1938–1939). He also continued his historical research. In autumn of 1939 he returned to Lwów, where he worked in the Science Academy of Ukraine. When World War II began, he was engaged in writing a comprehensive history of the Jews of Poland from the earliest beginnings through the twentieth century. After the fall of Poland at the beginning of World War II and the Nazi occupation of Lwów, Friedman went into hiding on the "Aryan side" of the city i.e. outside the Lwów Ghetto. He survived the war but lost his wife and daughter.

After the liberation of Poland, he taught Jewish History at the University of Łódź, and also served as the director of the Central Jewish Historical Commission (created by the Central Committee of Jews in Poland), whose mission was to gather data on Nazi war crimes. (The commission would become the Jewish Historical Institute, or Żydowski Instytut Historyczny.) He collected testimonies and documentation and also supervised the publication of a number of pioneering studies, including his own on the concentration camp at Auschwitz. This work, To jest Oświęcim, was published in Warsaw in 1945 and appeared in an abridged English version as This Is Oswięcim (1946). He also continued to publish historical works, including several monographs on various destroyed Jewish communities, including Lwów, Białystok and Chełmno and about Ukrainian-Jewish relations during the Nazi occupation. At the same time, he taught Jewish history at the University of Łódź (1945–1946) and was a member of the Polish State Commission to Investigate German War Crimes in Auschwitz and Chełmno.

After testifying at the Nuremberg trials, Friedman and his new wife decided not to return to Poland. For two years he directed the educational department of the Joint Distribution Committee in Allied-occupied Germany. He also helped the Center of Contemporary Jewish Documentation in Paris to set up its documentary collection. He immigrated to the United States of America in 1948 at the invitation of Salo Baron. There he first held the post of research fellow and then, from 1951 until his death, that of lecturer at Columbia University. From 1949, he also headed the Jewish Teachers Seminary and taught courses at the Herzliya Teachers Seminary in Israel and was the Research Director of the YIVO-Yad Vashem Joint Documentary Project, a bibliographical series on the Holocaust, from 1954 to 1960.

Friedman's post-war research focused on the Holocaust, including an account of the Warsaw ghetto uprising titled Martyrs and Fighters: The Epic of the Warsaw Ghetto (1954) and a volume describing Christian rescue, Their Brothers' Keepers (1957). A volume of his essays devoted to Holocaust topics, Pathways to Extinction: Essays on the Holocaust (1980), was edited posthumously by his wife, Dr. Ada Eber-Friedman. He also remained committed to his earlier scholarly interests, and published articles in Yiddish, Polish, Hebrew, French, and English, such as "Polish Jewish Historiography between the Two Wars" and "The First Millennium of Jewish Settlement in the Ukraine and in the Adjacent Areas."

Philip Friedman died in New York on February 7, 1960.
