= Shloyme Bastomski =

Russian Yiddish writer and educator (1891–1941)

- Born: July 1891; Vilna, Vilna Governorate, Russian Empire
- Died: 5 March 1941 (aged 49); Vilnius, Soviet-occupied Lithuania
- Education: Vilna Teacher's Seminary
- Occupations: Writer; educator; folklorist

Shloyme Bastomski (July 1891 – 5 March 1941, also referred to as Solomon or Shlomo) was a writer, educator, and folklorist active in the Yiddishist education movement.

== Biography ==
Shylome Bastomski was born in Vilna (now Vilnius, Lithuania) in June 1891 to a poor family of locksmiths. He was orphaned at a young age. He attended school both at Talmud Torah (a Jewish religious school) and a Russian public school for Jewish children, before attending the Vilna Teachers' Seminary, from which he graduated in 1912. He became a teacher at a Jewish public school in nearby Meretsh, but later transferred to one in Dieveniškės. Following the outbreak of World War I and the German occupation of the region in 1915, Bastomski was hired as a teacher at a Yiddish secular public school established by the Khevre Mefitse Haskole ('Society for the Promotion of Enlightenment'). The school was the first such institution in Vilna.

Bastomski worked as a journalist in addition to his teaching; he had published his first article on in the Vilner Vokhnblat ('Vilna Weekly') in 1910, and began writing for the local periodicals Lebn un Visnshaft and Folksblat, a short lived paper established by journalist Moyshe Karpinovitsh. In 1916, Bastomski founded a publishing house Di Naye Yidishe Folksshul ('The New Yiddish Folk-School') along with his wife Malke Khaymson, who served as his co-editor. Their publishing house began producing Yiddish-language textbooks, children's books, games, and folklore books. In 1919, he reestablished the Yiddish children's magazine Grininke Beymelekh, and founded a magazine aimed at older children (titled Der Khaver, 'The Friend') the following year. He published some of his own stories in these journals. He was a member of the folklore committee and general council of YIVO, a Jewish cultural institute based in Vilna. In 1925, Bastomski published a Yiddish reader entitled Lebedike Klangen ('Lively Sounds'), in six different reading levels. This reader became adopted by various Jewish schools outside of Poland.

Initially politically affiliated with the Socialist-Zionists, he later became a Jewish Territorialist, joining the Frayland-lige shortly before the outbreak of World War II. He died in Vilna in March 1941, while the city was under Soviet control (and shortly before Nazi German occupation). His wife died in the Vilna Ghetto shortly after.
