= David Einhorn (poet) =

Jewish writer (1886–1973)

- דוד אײנהאָרן
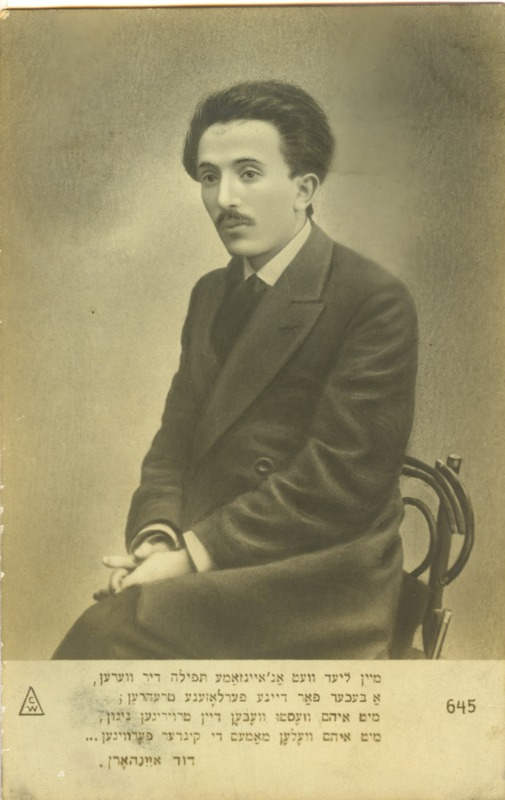
- Einhorn in c. 1930
- Born: 1886; Karelichy, Grodno Governorate, Russian Empire
- Died: 2 March 1973 (aged 86–87); New York City, United States
- Occupations: Poet; journalist; essayist
- Spouse: Genia Zissmann (m. 1917)

David Einhorn (Yiddish: דוד אײנהאָרן, romanized: Dovid Eynhorn, 1886 – 2 March 1973) was a poet, journalist, and essayist. Born in the Russian Empire to a Jewish family, he became a poet at a young age and participated within the General Jewish Labour Bund. After helping to found a publishing house in Vilnius he was arrested for his connections to the Bund in 1912, and was exiled from Russia; he went to Bern, where he contributed to journals and periodicals. He migrated to Poland in 1917, settling in Warsaw and publishing several books.

Upset by antisemitism in Warsaw, Einhorn migrated to Berlin and joined a growing Jewish intellectual community. He became a critic of Jewish activists in Berlin, as well as the German socialist and communist movements, which he saw as ineffective and out-of-touch with the working class. He became a columnist for the monthly magazine Der Jude and the New York Yiddish newspaper Forward. He grew pessimistic towards antisemitism in Germany, to which he felt many young Germans were naturally predisposed, and watched the emergence of the early Nazi Party with great anxiety. He left Germany in 1925 for Paris; there he lived until 1940, when he fled the country during the Nazi Invasion of France and settled as a refugee in New York City.

== Biography ==
In 1886, David Einhorn was born to a Jewish family in Karelichy, in a portion of the Russian Empire in what is now Belarus. He was the son of Binyomin Einhorn, a former military physician who became a government-appointed rabbi. He attended school in Vawkavysk, and began writing poetry at an early age, initially in Hebrew. He was deeply affected by the failure of the Russian Revolution of 1905, and turned to socialist and Bundist politics. He became active in the Yiddish literary movement, writing poems for the Yiddish literary journal Literarishe Monatsshriften in 1908.

Einhorn published his first book of poems, Shtile Gezangen ('Quiet Chants') in 1909, which was followed by Mayne Lider ('My Poems') in 1913. Critics praised the lyrical quality of the poems in these works, often focused on the conflict between the traditional order and modernity, and many were later set to music. He went to Vilna (now Vilnius) in 1910 to help found Boris Kletskin's publishing house. That same year, he worked as a secretary for Yiddish and Hebrew author Mendele Mocher Sforim.

=== Exile ===
In 1912, Einhorn was arrested for his connections to the General Jewish Labour Bund and imprisoned in Vilna for six months. Afterwards, he was exiled from the country; he initially traveled to Paris, before relocating in 1913 to Bern, Switzerland. There, in addition to study at the University of Bern, he wrote for the Yiddish children's periodical Grininke Beymelekh and the Vilna-based journal Di Yudishe Velt. He also made a Yiddish translation of the Book of Psalms during this period. From 1916 to 1917, he edited the Bern and Geneva-based biweekly refugee publication Di Fraye Shtime.

In 1917, Einhorn moved to Radom and then to Warsaw. That year, he wrote another book, Tsu a Yidisher Tokhter ('To a Jewish Daughter') as a wedding present to Genia Zissmann, who he married in March 1917. He wrote essays for a 1920 compilation entitled Di Tevye ('The Ark'), which he published alongside poet Alter Kacyzne. While in Warsaw, he contributed to the Bundist periodical Lebns-fragn, published by Bund leader Vladimir Medem.

=== Berlin ===
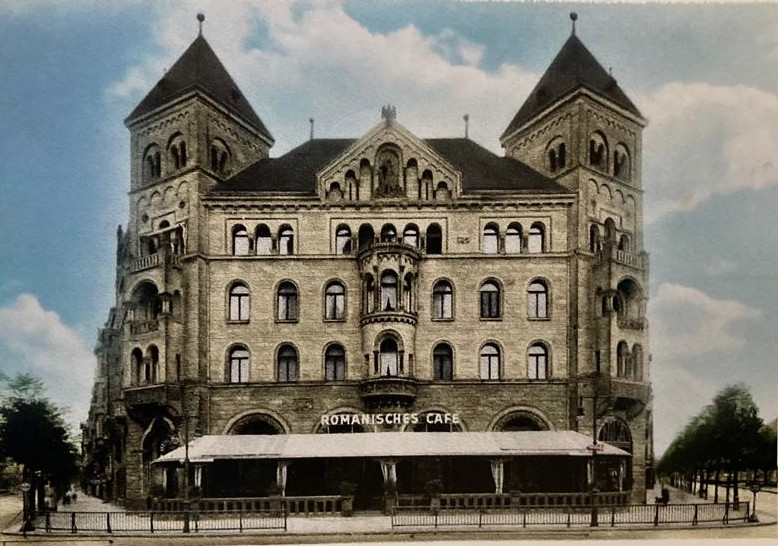
Einhorn met with many other members of the Jewish intellectual community at the Romanisches Café (pictured in a 1900 postcard)

Put off by antisemitism and what he called the "army atmosphere" of Warsaw, Einhorn moved to Berlin in the autumn of 1920. He frequented the Romanisches Café, which became a central meeting place for Jewish migrant intellecutals in Berlin, although began to strongly oppose the "coffee house culture" of many of the migrants, whom he decried as bourgeois intellectuals who "count the murdered victims of the Ukrainian pogroms like their own possessions, each night they establish new relief committees, film our sorrows, and expose our shame at the movies". He criticized the Jewish intelligentsia for prioritizing Jewish communities in Eastern Europe while largely ignoring Jewish migrant workers in Germany and establishing literary projects which would not reach a wider audience.

While in Berlin, Einhorn worked as a translator for a publishing house named Wostok and wrote a miscellany named Der Onheyb ('The Beginning') alongside journalist Shmaryahu Gorelik and linguist Max Weinreich. He edited a column on Yiddish literature in the monthly magazine Der Jude, and frequently contributed to the New York City-based Yiddish newspaper Forward, one of few writers in Berlin to do so. He published a compilation of his poems entitled Gezamlte Lider 1904-1924 ('Collected Poems 1904–1924') in Berlin in 1924.

Einhorn felt increasingly disappointed by communist and socialist movements in Germany; while sympathizing with the movement, he felt that communists in Germany had no chance against the dominance of the Social Democratic Party (SPD). He attended the 1923 conference of the Labour and Socialist International in Hamburg, where he wrote that he saw how the "body of immaculate socialism was carried to its grave". He felt that large amounts of young people in Germany were predisposed to racist and antisemitic ideas. Unlike many other intellectuals who dismissed the movement, he was deeply concerned by the initial emergence of Adolf Hitler's Nazi Party. He observed Nazi party meetings in Berlin, and concluded that rampant antisemitism was emerging across the political spectrum in Germany. Due to this, he left Berlin for Paris in the autumn of 1924, briefly returning for a visit in December.

=== Later life and death ===
In Paris, Einhorn continued journalism, where he served as the editor of a monthly periodical entitled Di Epokhe in 1928 and wrote a column in the Bundist journal Undzer Shtime ('Our Voice'). He contributed to the Yiddish encyclopedia Algemeyne Entsiklopedye in 1934, writing articles on the Wandering Jew trope and the Iliad. He fled Paris during the Battle of France in 1940, emigrating to the United States. He continued writing poems after emigrating, some under a number of pseudonyms including Monokarmus, A. Lezer, Akher, and Shigyon le-Dovid. He continued to contribute to the Forward, writing a weekly column in 1956 entitled "Tsvishn Tsvey Veltn" ('Between Two Worlds') which served as a memoir for Yiddish literary culture. He died in New York City on 2 March 1973.
