= Biblioteca Polaca Ignacio Domeyko =

Library named after a Polish scientist in Argentina

Coordinates: 34°35′07″S 58°25′32″W

The Ignacy Domeyko Polish Library (Polish: Biblioteka Polska im. Ignacego Domeyki, Spanish: Biblioteca Polaca Ignacio Domeyko) is the biggest Polish library in South America. Founded in 1960 in Buenos Aires, Argentina and named after the Polish geologist and mineralogist Ignacy Domeyko.

== History ==
It is the largest Polish library in South America, with a collection of more than 25,000 items. The idea for its creation was born in 1959, and it was to be a lasting monument to celebrate the 1000th anniversary of the founding of the Polish State. It was also to serve as a Polish Institute in Argentina and all of South America.

The founding members were 80 and included among them: Aleksandra Janta, Witold Malcuzynski, Witold Gombrowicz, Wiktor Ostrowski, Florian Czarnyszewicz and others. The first Board of Directors was appointed at a general meeting on June 4, 1960. Initially, premises were rented for the library. In 1964, it was decided to add a pavilion on land owned by the Union of Poles in Argentina, which was located at 2076 Serrano Street, now Jorge Luis Borges Street. Thanks to money donated by engineer Jan Kadenacy, the building was opened on April 30, 1966. The building and collections were damaged in a fire that broke out in early January 2005 It was rebuilt with the help of the Polish Community Association. In 2007, the Association of Poles in Argentina also renovated the library premises during the renovation of its headquarters.

In 2012, the library, in cooperation with the KARTA Center Foundation, established the Digital Archive of Local Tradition in Buenos Aires. Over the next 4 years, it collected 3900 photographs and 55 accounts of Poles and people of Polish origin living in Argentina.
