= Leo Ensel =

German conflict researcher and author

- Born: 1954 (age 71–72); Germany
- Occupations: Conflict researcher, author
- Known for: Wörterbuch der Kriegstüchtigkeit (Dictionary of War Readiness)

Leo Ensel (born 1954 in Heimbach / Neuwied) is a German conflict researcher and author specializing in intercultural education and especially in German-Russian relations.

== Biography ==
Leo Ensel was born in 1954 in Germany. He is currently residing in Oldenburg. He holds the academic titles Dr. phil. and Dipl.-Pädagoge. He is specialized in the post-Soviet region and Central/Eastern Europe. In the new east–west conflict, his main concern is overcoming false narratives, de-escalation, and rebuilding trust. The author emphasizes his independence and is committed solely to these topics, not to any national narrative. He is recognized for his work as a pedagogue focusing on social and cultural perceptions between Germans and Russians, particularly within the post-Soviet states. His research addresses stereotypes, cultural images, and historical relations between these groups, aiming to enhance understanding and dialogue.

In the 1980s, he made an important contribution to the West German peace movement by publishing a book (Richtige Angst und falsche Furcht) that addressed humanity's inability to sufficiently fear the potential nuclear self-destruction of humankind. This work already demonstrated his early commitment to exploring the psychological dimensions of peace preparation.

== Meetings with Stanislav Petrov and Mikhail Gorbachev ==
On 3 July 2016, Leo Ensel visited Stanislav Petrov, the ‘man who saved the world’, at his prefabricated apartment in Frjasino near Moscow to thank him for his level-headed behaviour on the night of 26 to 27 September 1983, which Petrov is believed to have prevented a Third World War.

On 18 April 2017 and 20 August 2019, he visited Mikhail Gorbachev at his foundation in Moscow. The two discussed the modalities of a "New Thinking 2.0". He later published his "Questions for Mikhail Gorbachev and for all of us" concerning "New Thinking 2.0" on the Gorbachev Foundation website.

== Wörterbuch der Kriegstüchtigkeit ==
Since May 2025 he is publishing the Wörterbuch der Kriegstüchtigkeit (Dictionary of War Readiness), which is published in sequels. His dictionary examines critically the German debate about the Ukraine war, which is characterized by warmongering and propaganda, increased arms deliveries, enemy images, fear of Russians, and belief in military power.

In his “Reflections on the Ukraine War”, he presents various perspectives and opposing arguments side by side in an unbiased manner, including viewpoints rarely represented in major newspapers, radio, and television that contradict the mainstream. In recent times he is preoccupied with apathy and shock in the face of the escalation of this war and wonders why the fears of a widening of the war remain silent and without consequences.

== Selected works ==
- Wörterbuch der Kriegstüchtigkeit (2025)
- Deutschlandbilder in der GUS: Szenische Erkundungen in Russland und Kasachstan. Oldenburg: BIS, 2001.
- Russen und Deutsche. Oldenburg: Zentrum für Pädagogische Berufspraxis, multiple editions: 1998, 1999 (revised and expanded), 2000 (3rd expanded reprint).
- Bilder vom fremden deutschen Alltag – Szenische Erkundung des innerdeutschen Ost-West-Konflikts. Oldenburg: Universität, ZpB, 1996.
- Richtige Angst und falsche Furcht – Psychologische Friedensvorbereitung und der Beitrag der Pädagogik. Frankfurt am Main: Fischer-Taschenbuch-Verlag, 1984.

=== Contributor ===
- Warum wir uns nicht leiden mögen. Was Ossis und Wessis voneinander halten. Münster: Agenda-Verlag, 1993 (1st ed.), 1995 (2nd ed.). (Contents)
- Quer zu den Disziplinen : Beiträge aus der Sozial-, Umwelt- und Wissenschaftsforschung. Offizin- Verlag Hannover, 1997, ISBN 3930345110
- Hermann Theisen (ed.): Bedrohter Diskurs: Deutsche Stimmen zum Ukrainekrieg. Donat Verlag, Bremen Jan 2024

=== Short analyses ===
- NATO in Ukraine's war: provocation and failure to prevent: Arsonists, sleepwalkers and the ignorant
- Die zweite Rede des Wladimir Putin: 15 Jahre nach der Münchner Sicherheitskonferenz 2007
- Reflexionen zum Ukrainekrieg – Der Krieg fiel nicht vom Himmel - Oder: Die Bedeutung der Deutung
- Über das neue Friedensplädoyer von Michail Gorbatschow
- Militärs und Diplomaten wollen "raus aus der Eskalationsspirale"
- Über die Aktualität des Neuen Denkens
- Der Mann, der die Welt vor einem Atomkrieg rettete.
