= The Jewish People: Past and Present =

1946–1952 reference work

- Publisher: Jewish Encyclopedic Handbooks
- Publication date: 1946–1952

The Jewish People: Past and Present is a three-volume reference work on the Jewish diaspora, published between 1946 and 1952.

== See also ==
- Di Algemeyne Entsiklopedye – 1934–1966 Yiddish-language encyclopedia
