= Vyalikaya Myadzvyadka =

Vyalikaya Myadzvyadka Вялікая Мядзвядка (Belarusian)
- Village
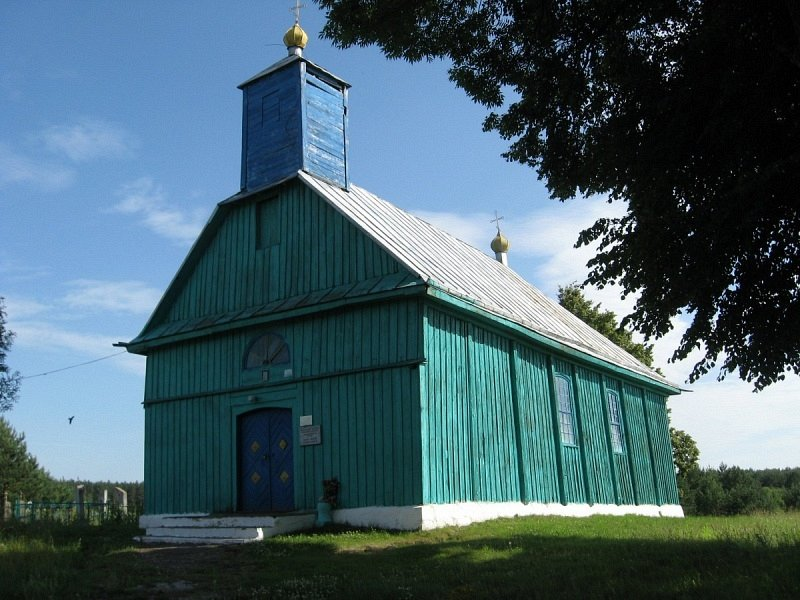

- Location within Belarus
- Coordinates: 53°22′46″N 26°21′38″E
- Country: Belarus
- Region: Grodno Region
- District: Karelichy District
- Time zone: UTC+3 (MSK)

Vyalikaya Myadzvyadka (Belarusian: Вялікая Мядзвядка, romanized: Vialikaja Miadzviadka; Russian: Большая Медвядка, romanized: Bolshaya Medvyadka; Polish: Niedźwiadka Wielka) is a village in Karelichy District, Grodno Region, Belarus. It is located 110 kilometres (68 mi) southwest of the capital Minsk. It is situated next to the Usza River and is part of Mir selsoviet; until 2013 it was part of Mir possoviet.

== History ==
Historically, the settlement was inhabited by Poles, forming part of the Polish–Lithuanian Commonwealth until 1795, when the third partition of Poland handed over control of the region to the Russian Empire. It became part of Poland again during the government of the Second Republic between 1918 and 1939, when it was invaded by the Red Army during World War II. After the end of the war and the formalization of the borders between the countries of the region, the former Niedźwiadka Wielka became part of the Byelorussian Soviet Socialist Republic and, since 1991, the independent state of Belarus.

In 1802, the naturalist Ignacy Domeyko was born on his family's farm, located in present-day Miadzviedka. In the city there is a monolith in his honour and the main street of the village is named after him. The town also has the Church of the Holy Ascension and a cemetery.

== Gallery ==
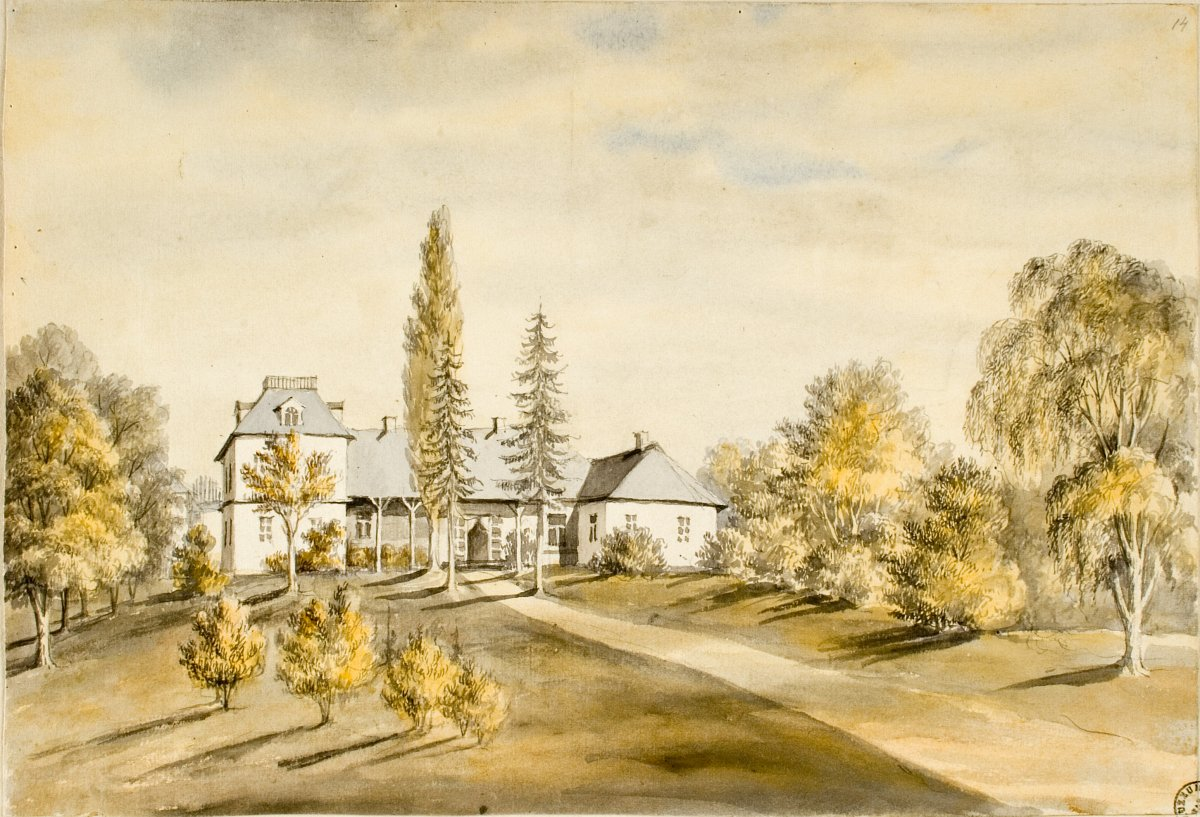
Damiejka farm circa 1875

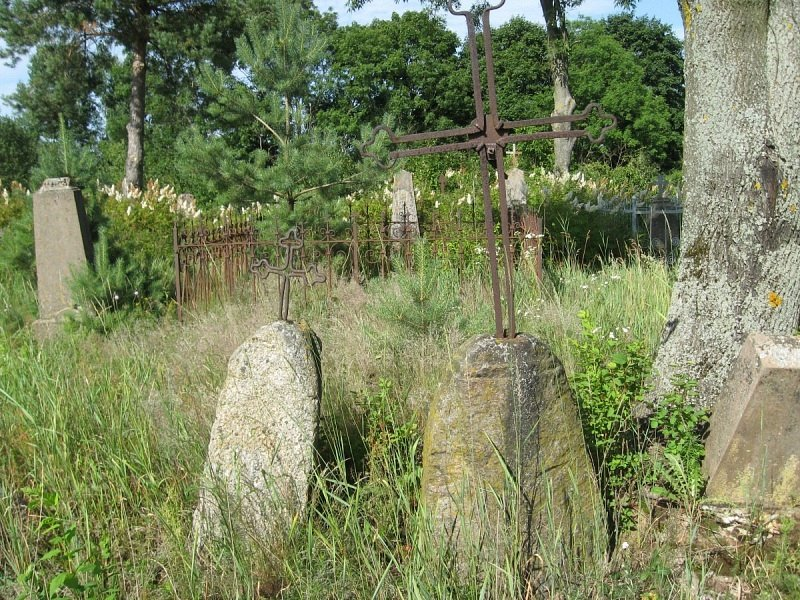
Town cemetery

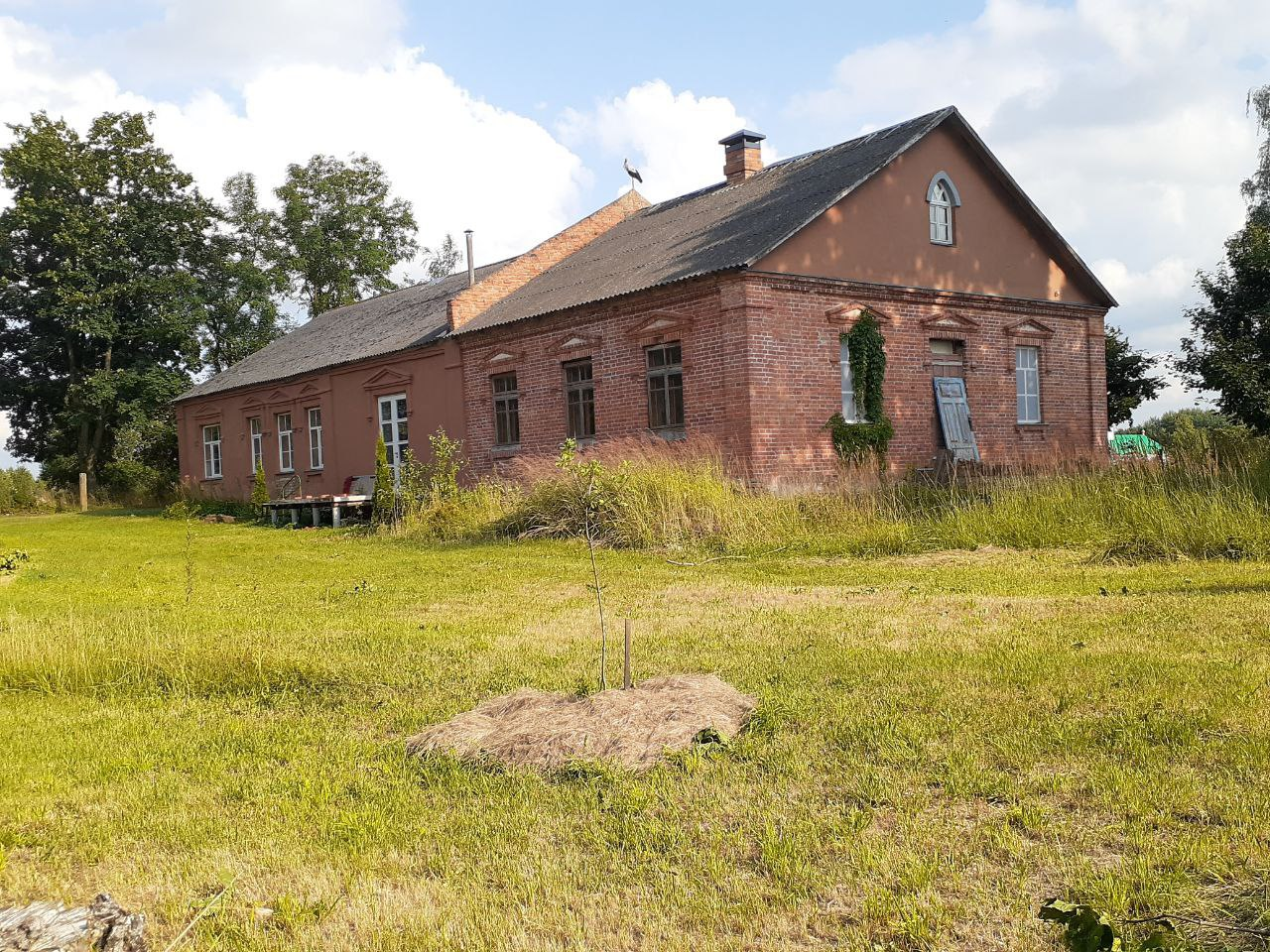

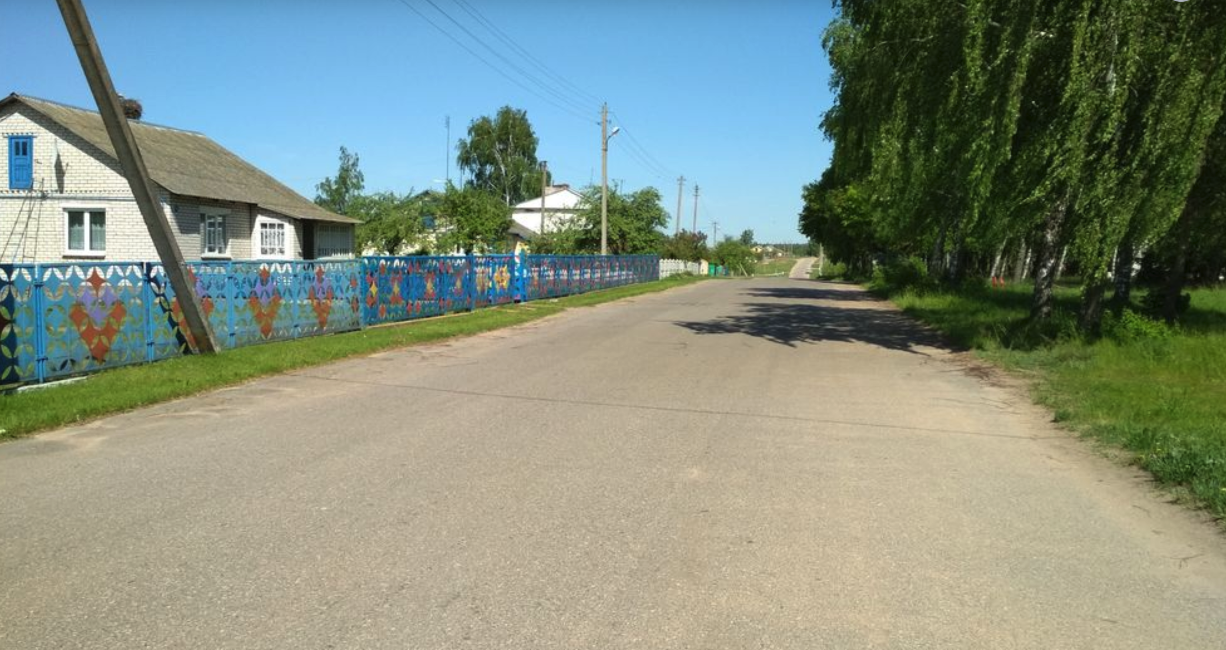

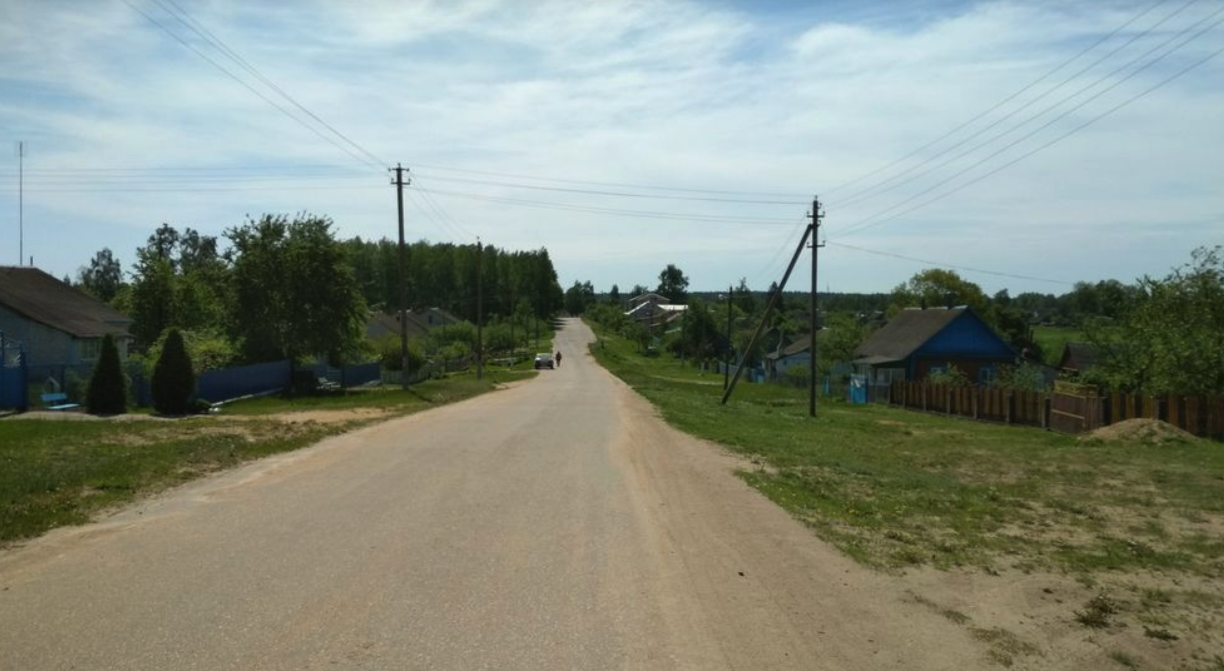

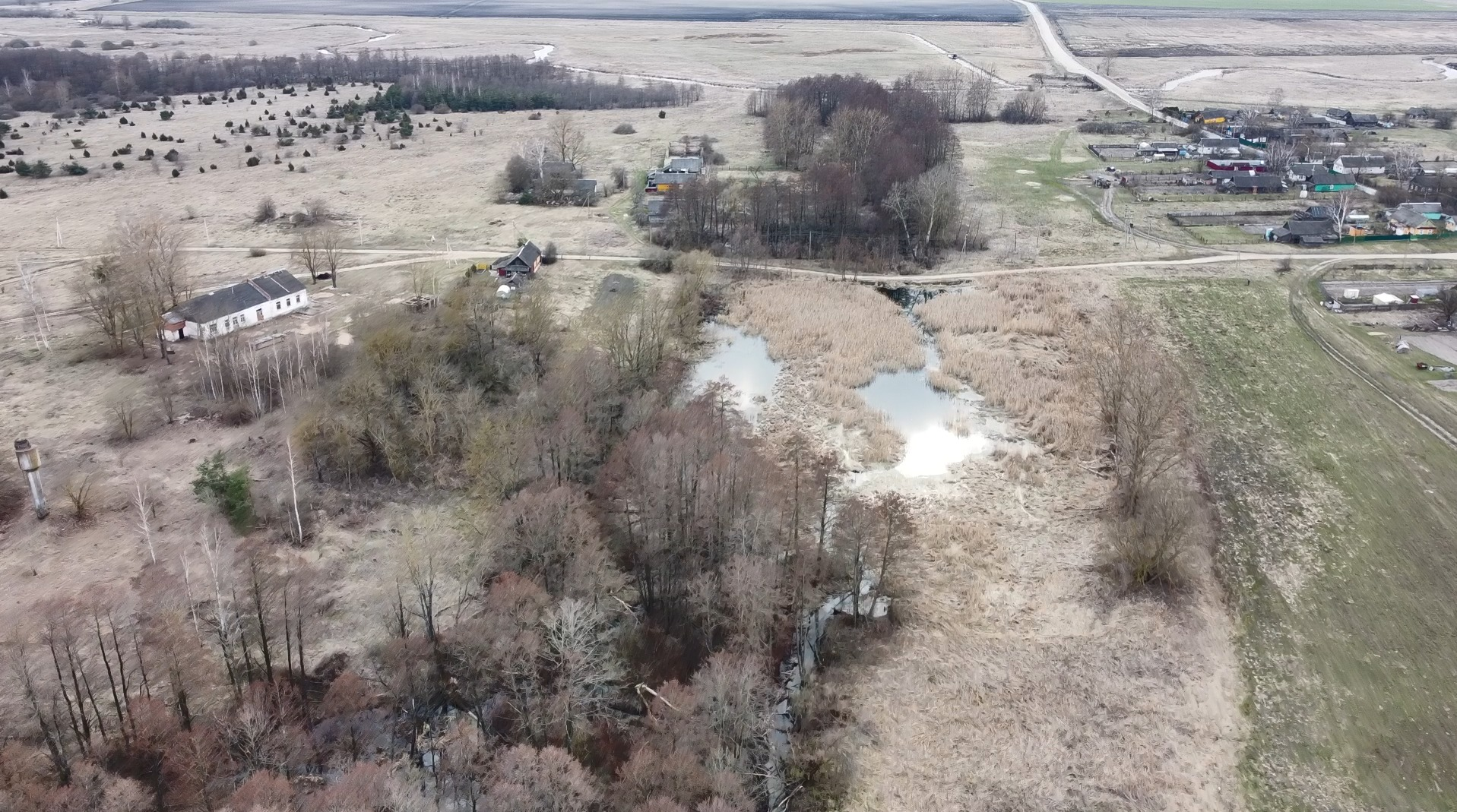

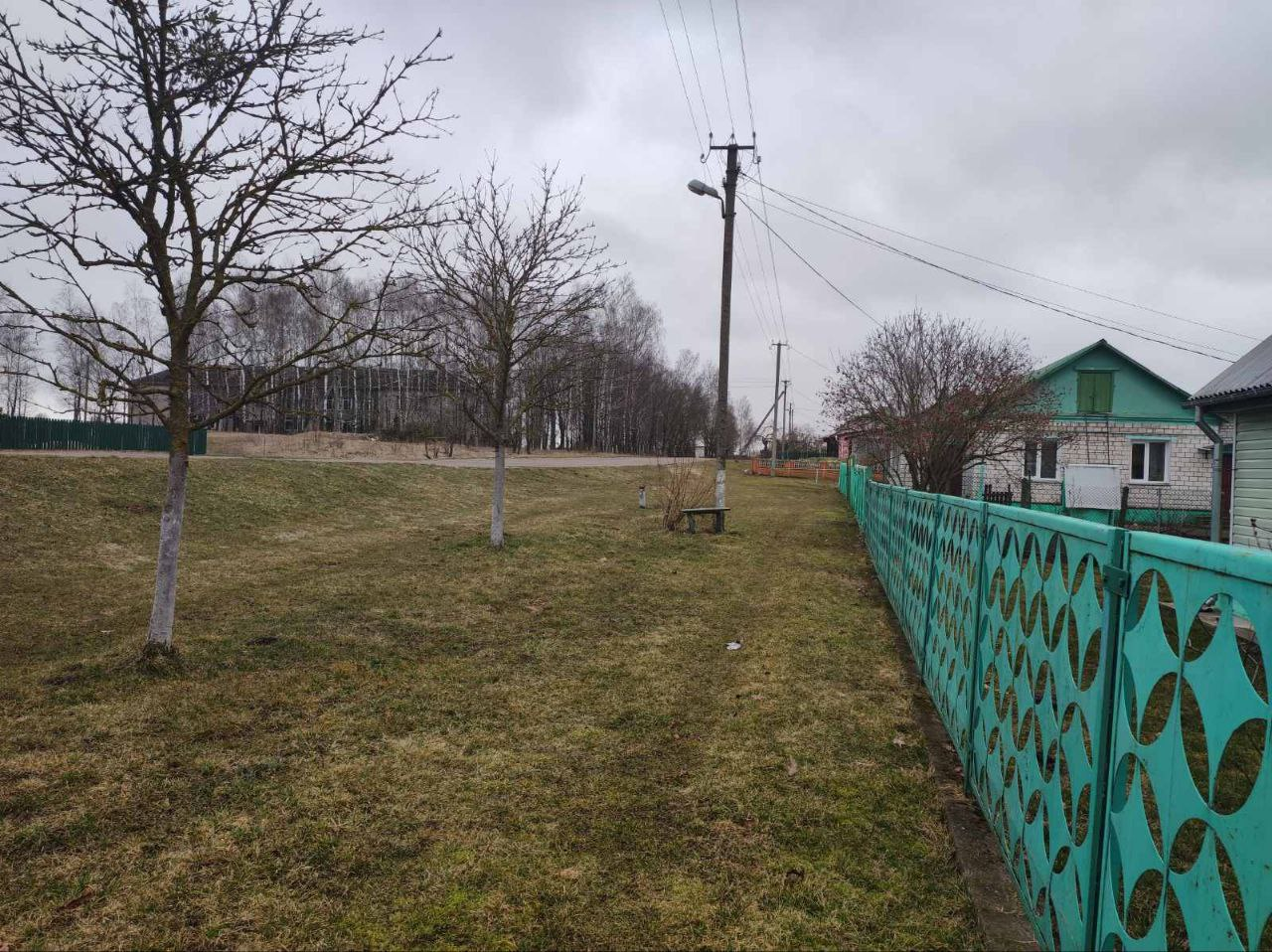
