= The Holocaust and the Exile of Yiddish =

2022 book by Barry Trachtenberg

- Author: Barry Trachtenberg
- Subject: Jewish history
- Publisher: Rutgers University Press
- Publication date: 2022
- Pages: 336
- ISBN: 978-1-97882-545-1

The Holocaust and the Exile of Yiddish: A History of the Alegemeyne Entsiklopedye is a 2022 history book by Barry Trachtenberg, published by Rutgers University Press.

== See also ==
- Di Algemeyne Entsiklopedye—1934–1966 Yiddish-language encyclopedia
