= Barys Rahula =

Belarusian political activist

- Барыс Рагуля
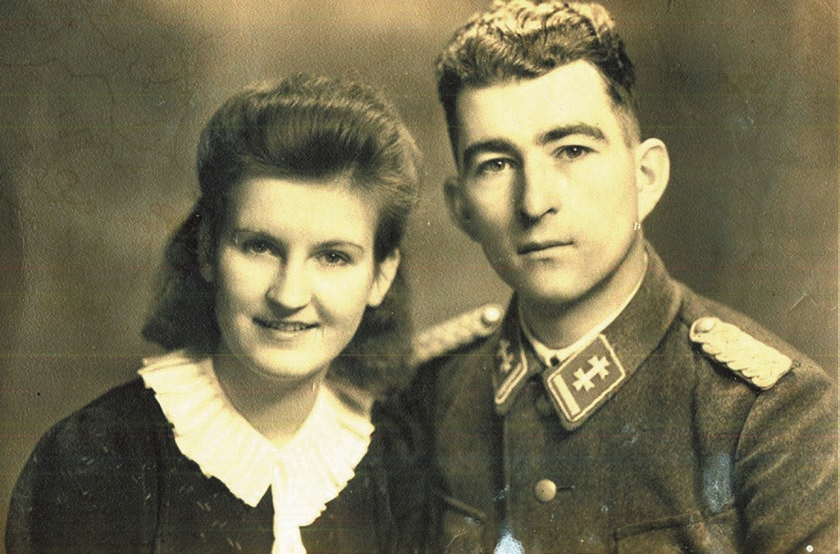
- Rahula and his wife following WWII.
- Born: 1 January 1920; Navahrudak, Poland
- Died: 22 April 2005 (aged 85); London, Ontario, Canada
- Education: Catholic University of Leuven
- Military career
- Nickname: Boris Ragula
- Commands: Schutzmannschaft Battalion 68

Barys Rahula (Belarusian: Барыс Рагуля, Boris Ragula, 1 January 1920 – 22 April 2005) was a Belarusian political activist. He served as a military commander of the Belarusian auxiliary police unit Schutzmannschaft Battalion 68. After the war, he studied medicine in the West and became a doctor in Canada.

== Biography ==
=== Early life and arrest ===
Barys Rahula was born near Navahrudak and spent his early years in West Belarus, then part of the Second Polish Republic. In 1938, he became student at the University of Vilnius but was mobilized into the Polish army after the Nazi-Soviet invasion of Poland. He soon became a German POW, but in 1940 escaped from German prison to West Belarus occupied by the Soviets. In Belarus, he was arrested by the NKVD but managed to escape from prison in the first days after Germany's attack on the USSR.

=== Career ===
Under German occupation, Rahula commanded Schutzmannschaft Battalion 68, taking part in anti-partisan actions against Polish and Soviet partisans. The unit numbered about 600 people, mostly recruited from among students and graduates of the Novogrudok teachers' seminary, usually with a strong Belarusian patriotic sentiment. In April 1944, the unit fought a battle with Soviet partisans near Karelichy. In May 1944, it took part in a partisan action near Dokshytsy and Hlybokaye. Contrary to what he states in his memoirs, his unit was never incorporated into the Belarusian Home Defense (BKA) and did not become a Belarusian unit independent of German rule. He left Belarus with the German army ahead of the Soviet advance.

== Personal life and death ==
After the war, Barys Rahula studied medicine at the Catholic University of Leuven. In 1954 he moved to Canada and became one of the country's better known oncologists as well as one of the leaders of the Belarusian Canadian community. After the Chernobyl Disaster, Rahula organized fund raising to support victims of the catastrophe. He died in 2005.

== Bibliography ==
- Grzybowski, Jerzy (2021). Białoruski ruch niepodległościowy w czasie II wojny światowej (in Polish). Warsaw. ISBN 978-83-8229-251-0.

== Selected books ==
- Беларускае студэнцтва на чужыне (Belarusian Students in the Strange Lands)
- Жыцьцё пад агнём (Living under Fire)
- Against the Current
