= Jewish Historical Institute =

Research foundation in Warsaw, Poland

the Emanuel Ringelblum Jewish Historical Institute
- Yiddish: ייִדישער היסטאָרישער אינסטיטוט
- Polish: Żydowski Instytut Historyczny

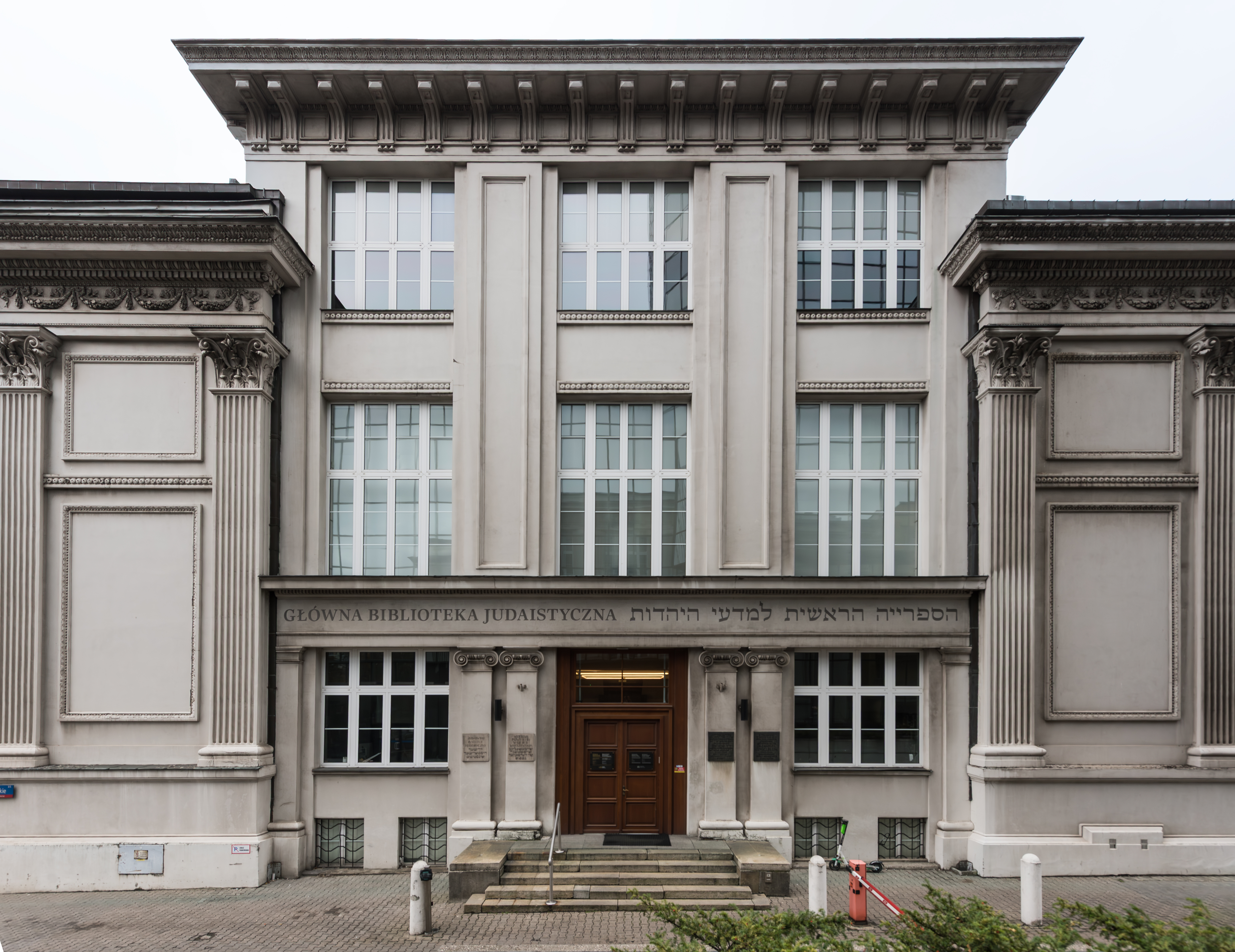
- Main entrance to Jewish Historical Institute, in Warsaw
- Founded: 1947
- Location(s): ul. Tłomackie 3/5 Warsaw
- Coordinates: 52.244167°N 21.002778°E
- Region served: Poland
- Director: Michał Trębacz
- Website: http://www.jhi.pl/en

The Jewish Historical Institute (Polish: Żydowski Instytut Historyczny or ŻIH; Yiddish: ייִדישער היסטאָרישער אינסטיטוט), also known as the Emanuel Ringelblum Jewish Historical Institute, is a public cultural and research institution in Warsaw, Poland, chiefly dealing with the history of Jews in Poland and Jewish culture.

== History ==
The Jewish Historical Institute was created in 1947 as a continuation of the Central Jewish Historical Commission, founded in 1944. The Jewish Historical Institute Association is the corporate body responsible for the building and the institute's holdings. The Institute falls under the jurisdiction of the Ministry of Culture and National Heritage. In 2009 it was named after Emanuel Ringelblum and became a public cultural institution. The institute is a repository of documentary materials relating to the Jewish historical presence in Poland. It is also a centre for academic research, study and the dissemination of knowledge about the history and culture of Polish Jewry.

The most valuable part of the collection is the Warsaw Ghetto Archive, known as the Ringelblum Archive (collected by the Oyneg Shabbos). It contains some 6,000 documents (some 30,000 pages).

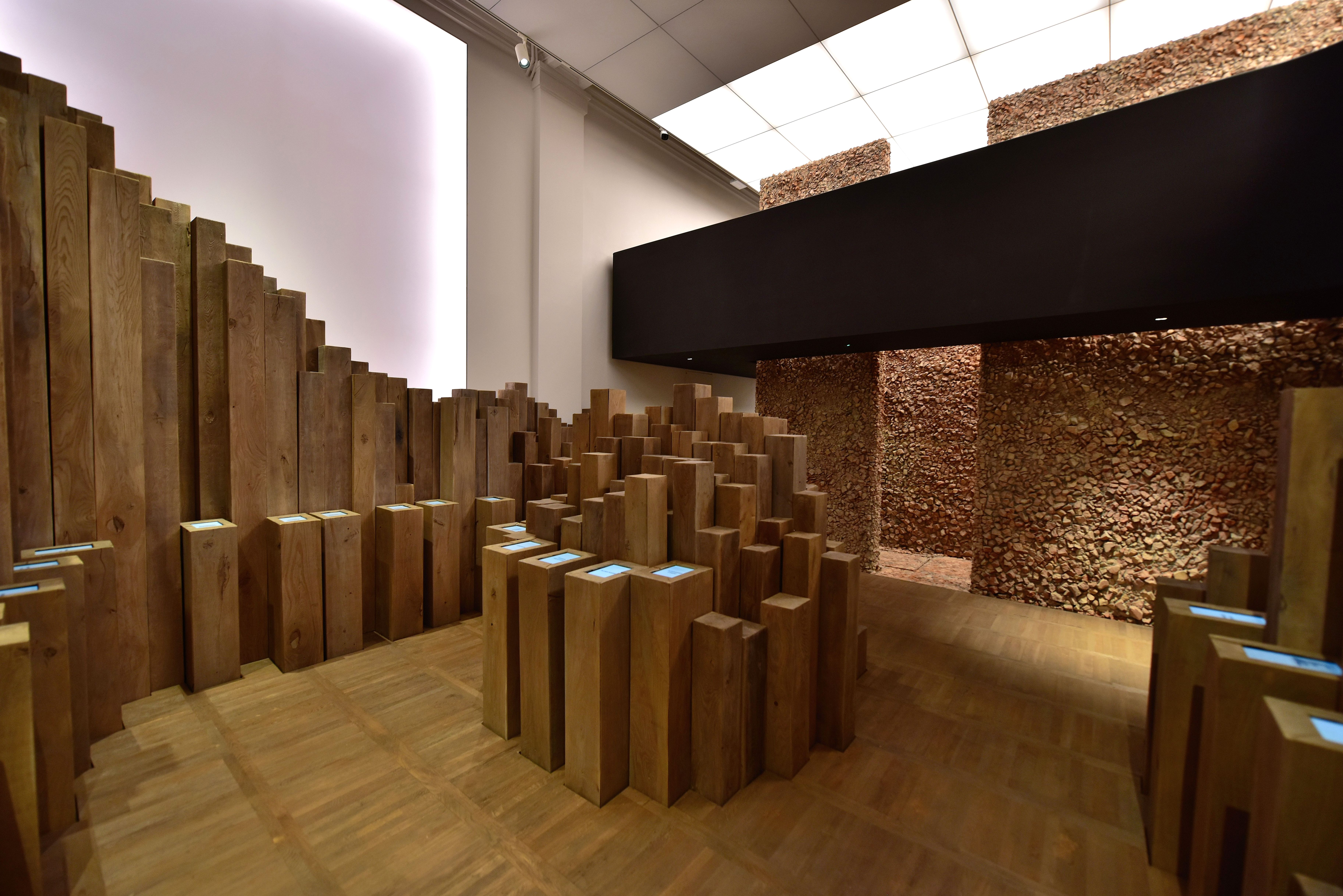
An exhibition on the first floor

Other important collections concerning World War II include testimonies (mainly of Jewish survivors of the Holocaust), memoirs and diaries, documentation of the Joint and Jewish Self-Help (welfare organizations active in Poland under the occupation), and documents from the Jewish Councils (Judenräte). The section on the documentation of Jewish historical sites holds about 40 thousand photographs concerning Jewish life and culture in Poland.

The institute has published a series of documents from the Ringelblum Archive, as well as numerous wartime memoirs and diaries. Also, for over 60 years now, the institute has been publishing an academic journal renamed in 2001 as the Jewish History Quarterly (Polish: Kwartalnik Historii Żydów), registered on the Master Journal List of outstanding academic journals in 2011.

In 2021, Monika Krawczyk, a lawyer and the managing director of the Foundation for the Preservation of Jewish Heritage in the years 2004–2019, was appointed the Director of the Jewish Historical Institute by the Minister of Culture and National Heritage.

In 2024, a group of Institute employees sent a letter to the new Minister of Culture and National Heritage, calling the director "authoritarian and incompetent".

== Directors ==
- Nachman Blumental, 1947 to 1949
- Bernard Ber Mark, 1949 to 1966
- Artur Eisenbach, 1966 to 1968
- Szymon Datner, 1969 to 1970
- Feliks Tych, 1995 to 2006
- Eleonora Bergman, 2007-2011
- Paweł Śpiewak, 2011-2020
- Monika Krawczyk, 2021-2024
- Michał Trębacz, acting director since 2024
