= In geveb =

Journal of Yiddish studies

In geveb: A Journal of Yiddish Studies
- Discipline: Yiddish studies
- Language: English and Yiddish
- Edited by: Jessica Kirzane

Publication details
- History: 2015–present
- Open access: Yes

Standard abbreviations
- ISO 4: In geveb

Indexing
- ISSN: 2381-5973

Links
- Journal homepage

In geveb: A Journal of Yiddish Studies (Yiddish: אין געװעב) is an open-access digital forum for the publication of peer-reviewed academic articles, the translation and annotation of Yiddish texts, the presentation of digitized archival documents, the exchange of pedagogical materials, and a blog about Yiddish culture. The journal "aims to be a central address for the study of all things Yiddish—the focal point for discussions of Yiddish literature, language, and culture, and the home for the next generation of Yiddish scholarship." It seeks to create dialogue about Yiddish culture between scholars and writers throughout the world. The name In geveb was inspired by a collection of poetry by the Yiddish writer Yehoash, but also can be translated as "online," signifying the journal's digital-only status and future-leaning ambitions.

Zachary M. Baker's "Resources in Yiddish Studies" series, published by In geveb, received Honorable Mention from the Association of Jewish Libraries in their 2018 Reference and Bibliography Awards.

In 2025, Justine Orlovsky-Schnitzler's “Yiddish and the Jewish Voice in the Zone of Interest” received first place for web-based criticism from the 2025 American Jewish Press Association Simon J. Rockower Awards.

In geveb receives financial support from the Max & Anna Levinson Foundation, the Marinus and Minna B. Koster Foundation, the Naomi Prawer Kadar Foundation, the Michael H. Baker Family Foundation, the Neal and Susan Broxmeyer Family Foundation, and the Atran Foundation.

== History ==
In geveb was founded in 2015 to replace a previous Yiddish journal which ceased publication in 2008. It was founded by David Roskies, Eitan Kensky, and Saul Noam Zaritt.

Since 2018, Yiddish professor and researcher at the University of Chicago Jessica Kirzane has been the journal's editor-in-chief.

== The Milgroym Project ==
In 2018–19, In geveb collaborated with Tel Aviv University and the National Library of Israel's Historical Jewish Press project to publish full-color scans and translations from rare Yiddish avant-garde journals originally published between the two world wars. The first such journal to be published was Milgroym, published in Berlin from 1922 to 1924, from which the project took its name.
