= Grininke Beymelekh =

Yiddish children's magazine (1914–1939)

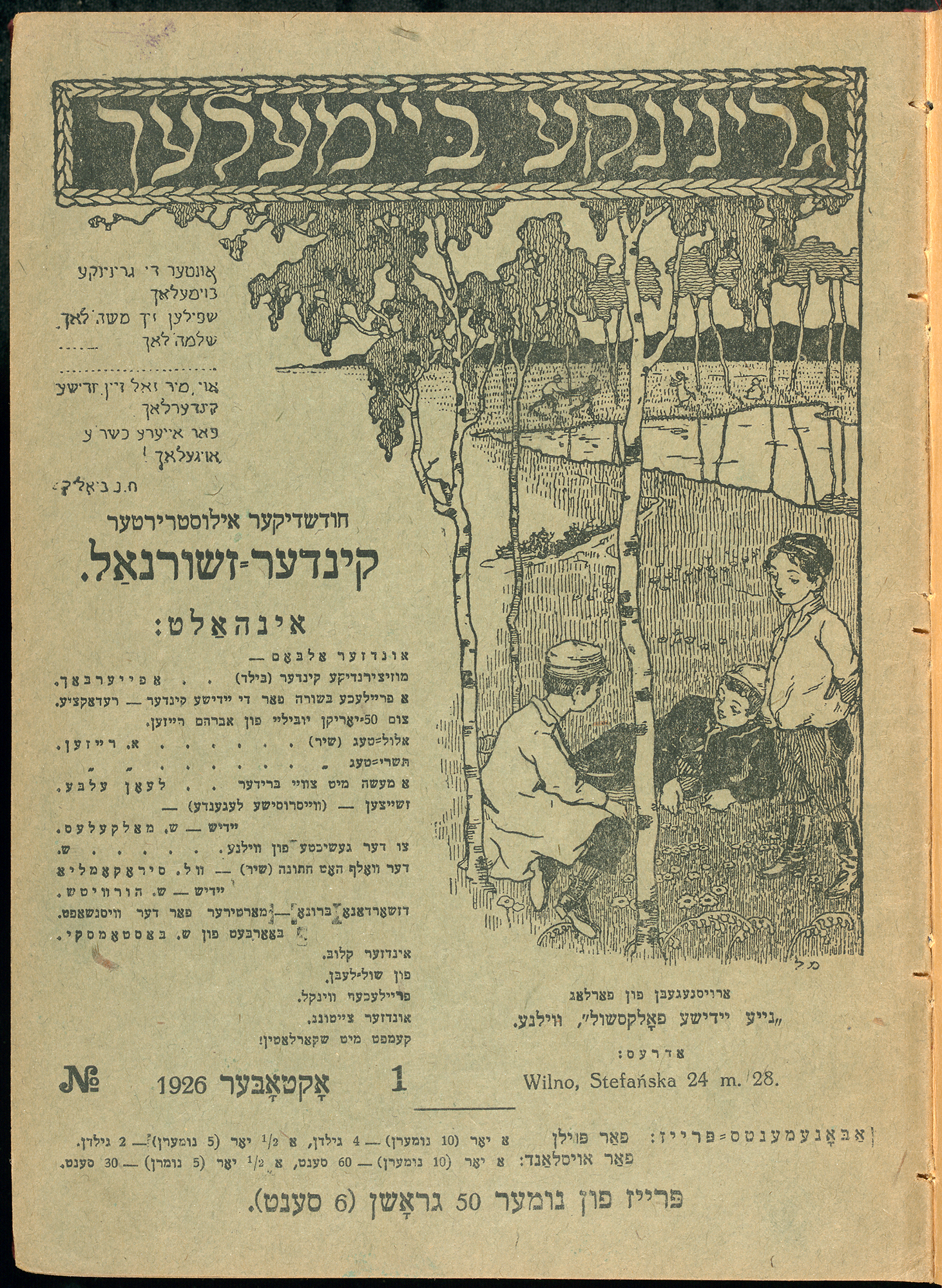
- Founder(s): Nochum Shtif
- Publisher: Boris Kletzkin
- Editor: Falk Heyleprin (1914–1915) Shlomo Bastomsky (after 1919)
- Founded: February 1914
- Ceased publication: 1939

Grininke Beymelekh (Yiddish: גרינינקע ביימעלעך, lit. 'Little Green Trees') was a Yiddish-language children's periodical published in Vilna, Lithuania (now Vilnius), intermittently from 1914 to 1939.

== Description ==
Grininke Beymelekh began publication in February 1914 by the publishing house of Boris Kletzkin in Vilna, Lithuania, and was managed by linguist Nochum Shtif and edited by poet and educator Falk Halperin. Twenty issues of the paper were produced in 1914 and 1915, until it was forced to cease publication due to the spread of the First World War. Although a children's paper entitled Farn Kleynem Oylem was included with the newspaper Di Yidishe Vokh from 1912 to 1913, Grininke Beymelekh was the first Yiddish children's magazine published as its own periodical. The name of the periodical was taken from a 1901 poem about Jewish children ("Unter di grininke beymelekh", 'Under the Green Trees') by Hayim Nahman Bialik.

After the war, the paper was continued in 1919 under the editorship of Shlomo Bastomsky, who had long been an advocate for a Yiddish children's paper. The following year, Bastomsky founded a magazine aimed at older children titled Der Khaver ('The Friend'). Both of these papers ceased publication in 1922, but Grininke Beymelekh was reestablished by Bastomsky in 1926, as was Der Khaver three years later. Although specific circulation figures have not been recorded, the Grininke Beymelekh likely sold around 1,000 papers per issue. Yiddish children's journals were frequently short-lived, but the Grininke Beymelekh continued publication from 1926 until the outbreak of the Second World War in 1939.
