= Aryeh Tartakower =

Polish-born Israeli political activist, historian and sociologist (1897–1982)

- אריה טרטקובר
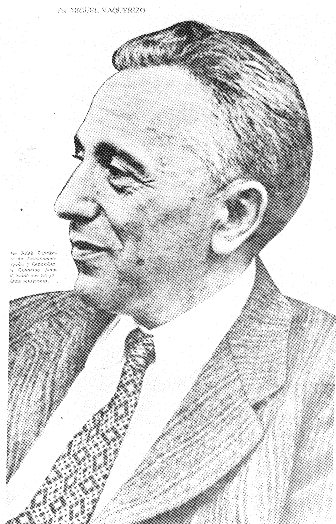
- Born: 1897; Brody, Eastern Galicia
- Died: 1982 (aged 84–85); Jerusalem, Israel
- Education: University of Vienna
- Occupations: Historian, sociologist

Aryeh Tartakower (Hebrew: אריה טרטקובר; 1897–1982) was a Polish-born Israeli political activist, historian and sociologist. He was the Director of the Department of Relief and Rehabilitation of the World Jewish Congress during World War II. He was the Chair of the Department of Sociology at the Hebrew University of Jerusalem, and the author of many books about Jewish refugees and Israel.

== Early life ==
Aryeh Tartakower was born in 1897 in Brody, Eastern Galicia. He graduated from the University of Vienna.

== Career ==
Tartakower was the founder and chairman of the Histadrut Zionist Labor Party in Poland from 1922 to 1939.

Tartakower joined the World Zionist Actions Committee in 1927. He served as the Director of the Department of Relief and Rehabilitation and Deputy Director of the Institute of Jewish Affairs at the World Jewish Congress in New York City from 1939 to 1946. He alerted U.S. government officials about the fascist past of Romanian emigrant Valerian Trifa in 1962. Tartakower subsequently served as the chair of its cultural department. He also joined the executive committee of the World Hebrew Confederation in 1959. By 1976, he served as the chair of the Falasha Relief Committee, where he helped Ethiopian Jews emigrate to Israel.

Tatakower taught sociology at the Institute of Jewish Sciences in Warsaw, Poland from 1932 to 1939. After he made aliyah in 1946, he served as the Chair of the Department of Sociology at the Hebrew University of Jerusalem. He was the author of many books in Polish, English, Yiddish and Hebrew.

== Death ==
Tartakower died in 1982 in Jerusalem, Israel.

== Works ==
- Tartakower, Aryeh (1929–1931). Toledot Tenu'at ha-Avodah ha-Yehudit.
- Grossman, Kurt R.; Tartakower, Aryeh (1944). The Jewish Refugee. New York: Institute of Jewish Affairs of the American Jewish Congress and World Jewish Congress. OCLC 986273.
- Tartakower, Aryeh (1947). Nedudei ha-Yehudim ba-Olam.
- Tartakower, Aryeh (1954). Ha-Adam ha-Noded.
- Tartakower, Aryeh (1957). Ha-Ḥevrah ha-Yehudit.
- Tartakower, Aryeh (1958). In Search of Home and Freedom. London, U.K.: Lincolns-Prager. OCLC 4320908.
- Tartakower, Aryeh (1959). Ha-Ḥevrah ha-Yisre'elit.
- Tartakower, Aryeh (1959). Ha-Hityashevut ha-Yehudit ba-Golah.
- Tartakower, Aryeh (1963). Am ve-Olamo.
- Tartakower, Aryeh (1963–1969). Shivtei Yisrael.
