= Ignacy Domeyko =

Polish-Chilean geologist and educator

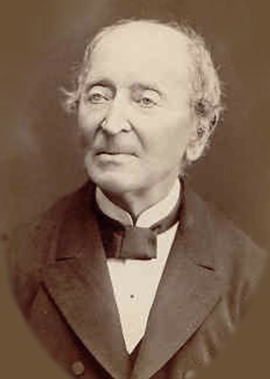
- Born: 31 July 1802; Niedźwiadka Wielka, Russian Empire
- Died: 23 January 1889 (aged 86); Santiago, Chile
- Education: Vilnius University
- Occupations: geologist, mineralogist

Ignacy Domeyko or Domejko, pseudonym: Żegota (Spanish: Ignacio Domeyko, Spanish pronunciation: [iɣˈnasjo ðoˈmejko]; 31 July 1802 – 23 January 1889) was a Polish geologist, mineralogist, educator, and founder of the University of Santiago, in Chile. Domeyko spent most of his life, and died, in his adopted country, Chile.

After a youth passed in the partitioned Polish-Lithuanian Commonwealth, Domeyko participated in the November 1830 Uprising against the Russian Empire. On the Uprising's defeat, he was exiled and spent part of his life in France (where he went with fellow Philomath, the Polish Romantic poet Adam Mickiewicz) before eventually settling in Chile, whose citizen he became.

He lived half a century in Chile and made major contributions to the study of that country's geography, geology, and mineralogy. His observations on the circumstances of poverty-stricken miners and their wealthy exploiters had a profound influence on those who would go on to shape Chile's labor movement.

Domeyko is seen as having had close ties to several countries and thus in 2002, when UNESCO organized a series of commemorations of the 200th anniversary of his birth, he was referred to as "a citizen of the world".

== Life ==
=== Early life ===
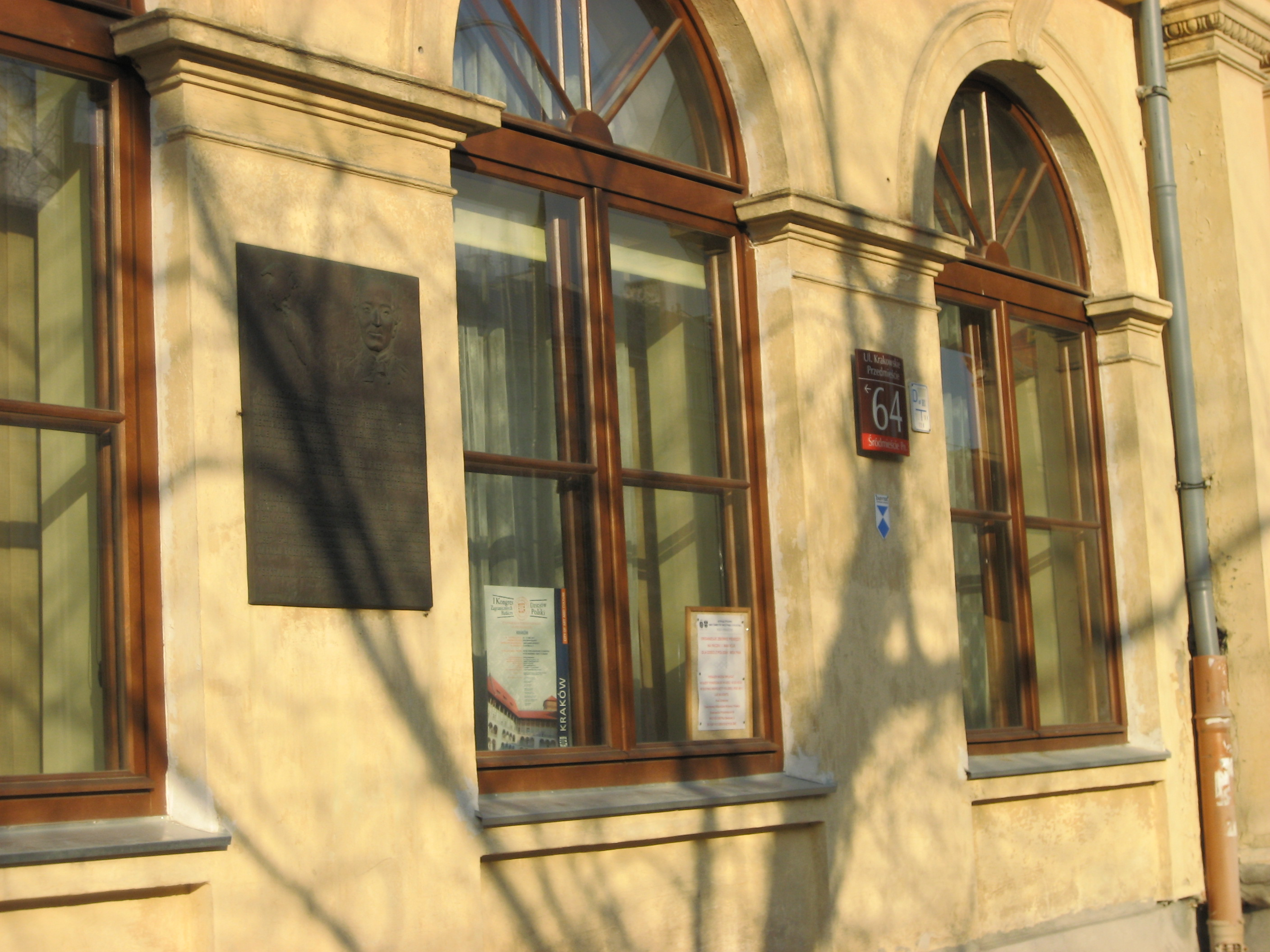
Plaque commemorating Domeyko in Warsaw on Krakowskie Przedmieście Street 64

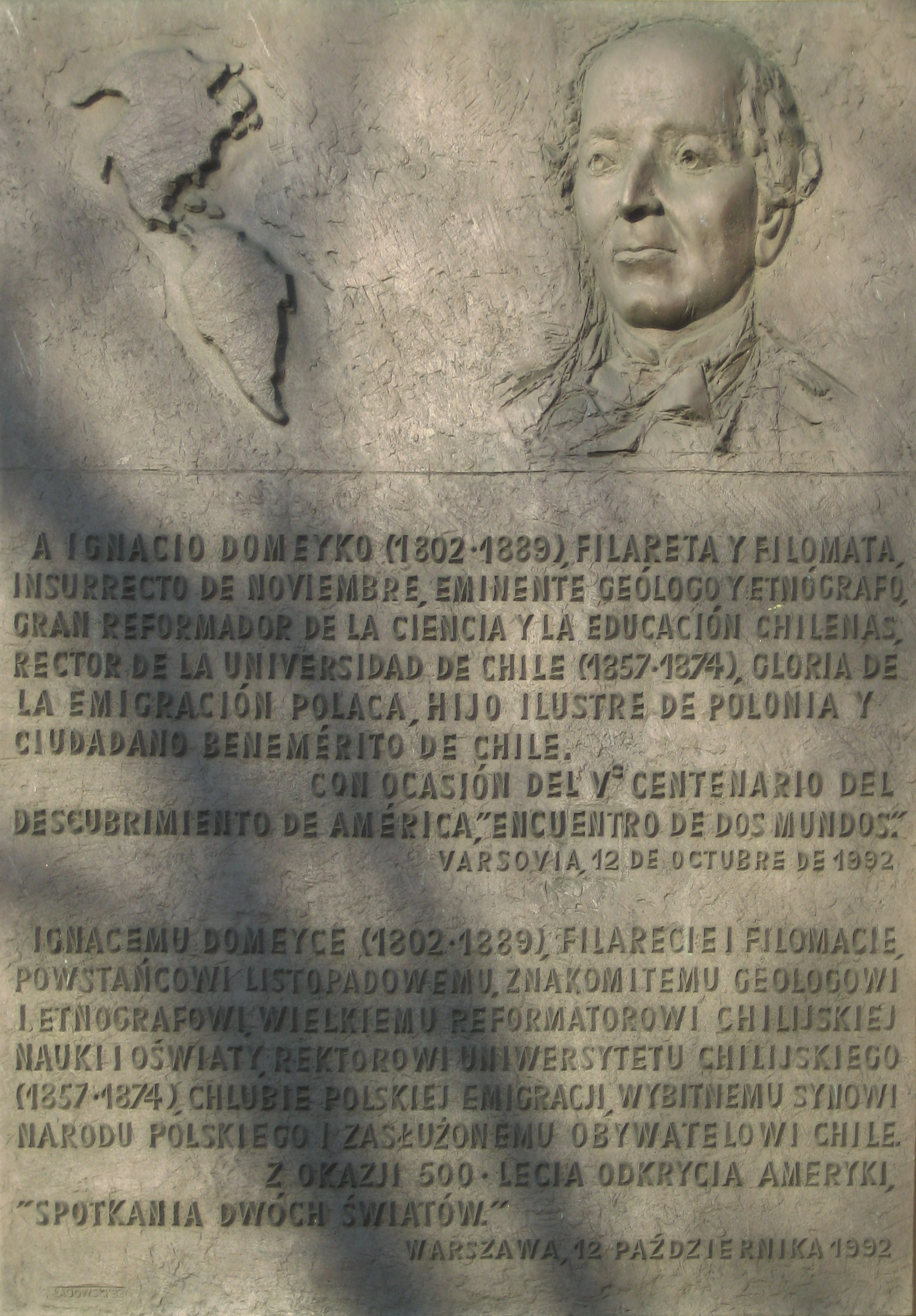
Plaque commemorating the "distinguished son of the Polish nation and eminent citizen of Chile"

Ignacy Domeyko was born in the then Russian partition of the former Polish–Lithuanian Commonwealth, at Niedźwiadka Wielka (Belarusian: Мядзьведка, romanized: Miadzviedka) Manor near Nieśwież, Minsk Governorate, Imperial Russia (now Karelichy district, Belarus). The Domeyko family held the Polish Dangiel coat of arms. Ignacy's father, Hipolit Domeyko, who was president of the local land court (Polish: sąd ziemski), died when Ignacy was seven years old; the boy's uncles then served as his guardians.

In his youth Ignacy was a subject of the Russian Empire. He had, however, been brought up in the culture of the Polish–Lithuanian Commonwealth, a multicultural state whose educated and dominant classes had spoken Polish as a lingua franca. Shortly before Domeyko's birth, the Commonwealth had been dismembered in the partitions of the Polish–Lithuanian Commonwealth. For this reason, and because Domeyko subsequently spent most of his life in Chile, he is considered a person of national importance to Poles, Belarusians, Lithuanians, and Chileans.

Domeyko enrolled at Vilnius University, then known as the Imperial University of Vilna, in 1816 as a student of mathematics and physics. He studied under Jędrzej Śniadecki. Involved with the Philomaths, a secret student organisation dedicated to Polish culture and the restoration of Poland's independence, he was a close friend of Adam Mickiewicz. In 1823–24, during the investigation and trials of the Philomaths, Domeyko and Mickiewicz spent months incarcerated at Vilnius' Uniate Basilian monastery.

After participating in the November 1830 Uprising, in which Domeyko served as an officer under General Dezydery Chłapowski, in 1831 Domeyko was forced into exile in order not to face Russian reprisals.

=== Exile ===
Journeying through Germany, he arrived in France, where he would earn an engineering degree at Paris' École des Mines (School of Mining). He also studied at the Sorbonne and maintained his political engagements with Belarusians, Poles, and Lithuanians.

==== Chile ====
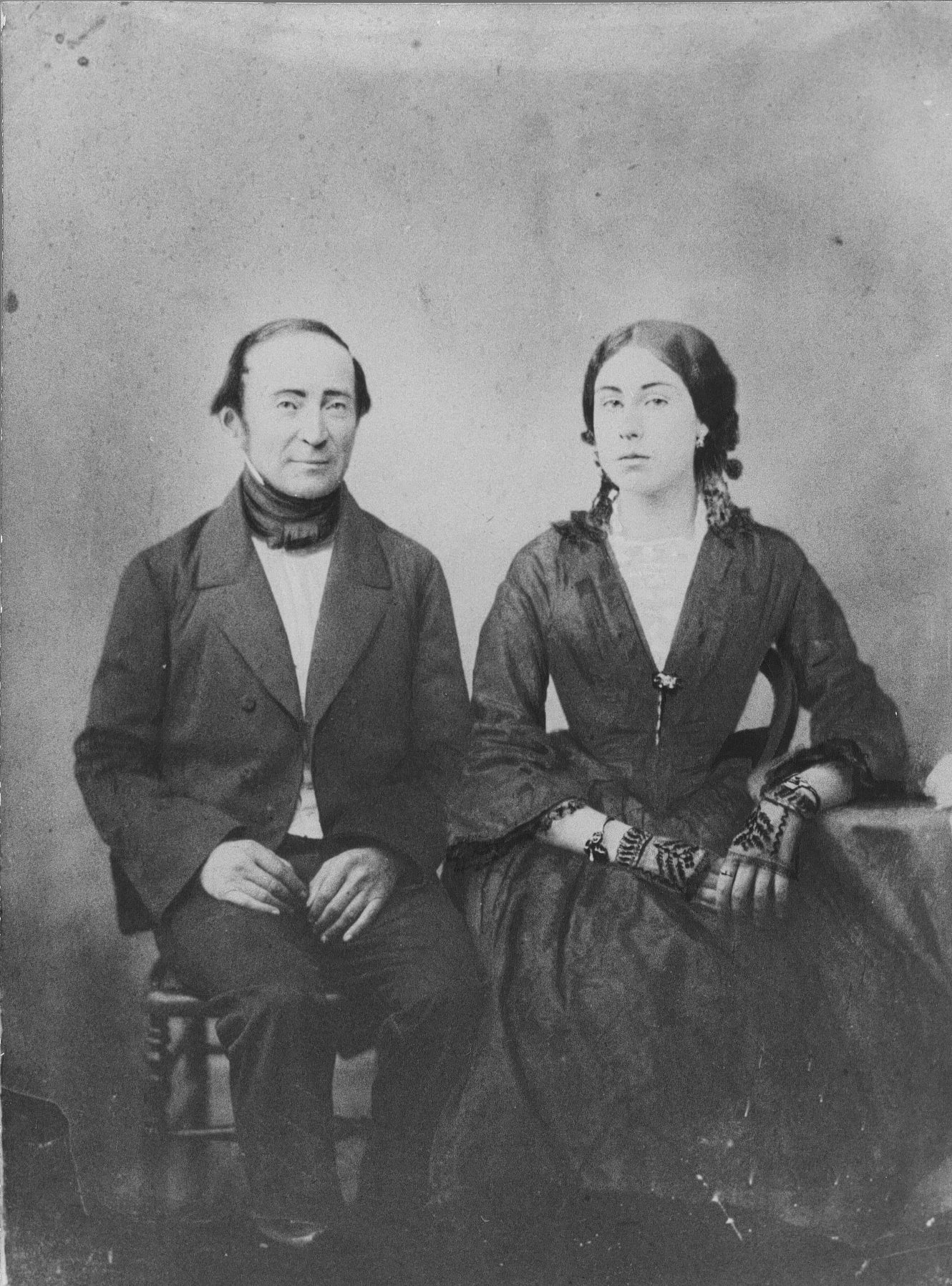
Domeyko with his wife, Enriqueta Sotomayor y Guzmán, 1854

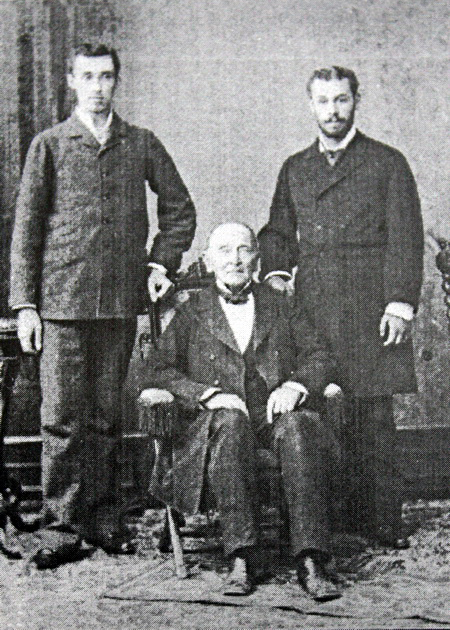
Domeyko with his sons

In 1838 Domeyko left for Chile. There he made substantial contributions to mineralogy and the technology of mining, studied several previously unknown minerals, advocated for the civil rights of the native tribal peoples, and was a meteorologist and ethnographer. He is also credited with introducing the metric system to Latin America.

He served as a professor at a mining college in Coquimbo (La Serena) and after 1847 at the University of Chile (Universidad de Chile, in Santiago), of which he was rector for 16 years (1867–83). Domeyko gained Chilean citizenship in 1849, but declared at the time that "I may now never change my citizenship, but God grants me hope that wherever I may be—whether in the Cordilleras or in [the Vilnius suburb of] Paneriai—I shall die a Lithuanian." The term "Lithuanian" at that time designated any inhabitant, whatever his ethnicity, of the territories of the former Grand Duchy of Lithuania.

In 1884 Domeyko returned for an extended visit to Europe and remained there until 1889, visiting his birthplace and other places in the former Commonwealth, as well as Paris.

In 1887 he was awarded an honorary doctorate by the Jagiellonian University, in Kraków.

In 1889, soon after returning to Santiago, Chile, Domeyko died.

== Memorials ==
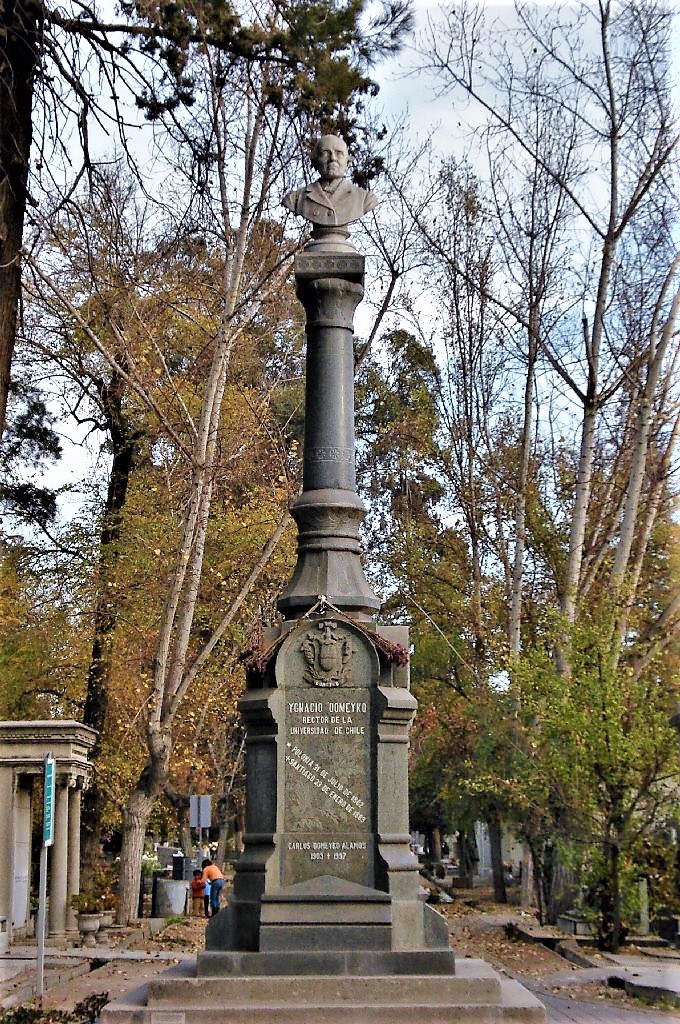
Domeyko's tomb, Santiago, Chile

Named in honour of Domeyko are:

- the plant genus Domeykoa, whose species range from Peru to Chile,
- the mineral domeykite,
- the shellfish Nautilus domeykus,
- the dinosaur genus Domeykosaurus,
- the ammonite Amonites domeykanus,
- the asteroid 2784 Domeyko,
- the Cordillera Domeyko mountain range in the Andes, and
- the Chilean town of Domeyko.

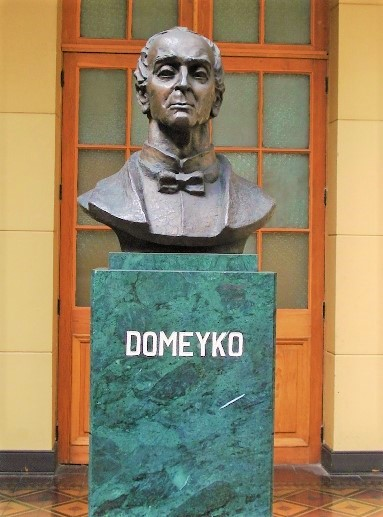
Bust of Domeyko, University of Chile

A bronze bust of Domeyko stands in the Casa Central de la Universidad de Chile, of which Domeyko was long-time rector.

In 1992, a plaque in Spanish and Polish was placed on a building at Krakowskie Przedmieście 64, in Warsaw, Poland, commemorating the "distinguished son of the Polish nation and eminent citizen of Chile."

On the 200th anniversary of his birth, UNESCO declared 2002 to be "Ignacy Domeyko Year." Several commemorative events were held in Chile under the auspices of Polish President Aleksander Kwaśniewski and Chilean President Ricardo Lagos.

In 2002, Poland and Chile jointly issued a postage stamp commemorating the 200th anniversary of Domeyko's birth.

Also in 2002, a 200th-birthday plaque honoring him was placed in the entry gate to Uniate Basilian monastery in Vilnius, Lithuania, where he and Adam Mickiewicz were held in 1823–24 during the investigation and trials of the Philomaths.

In 2015 a Belarusian climber Pavel Gorbunov placed a memorial plate on the top of Cerro Kimal in Cordillera Domeyko.

== See also ==
- Biblioteca Polaca Ignacio Domeyko
- Polish-Lithuanian (adjective)
- List of minor planets named after people
- List of Poles
- Timeline of Polish science and technology
