= Karelichy =

Karelichy Карэлічы (Belarusian)
- Urban-type settlement
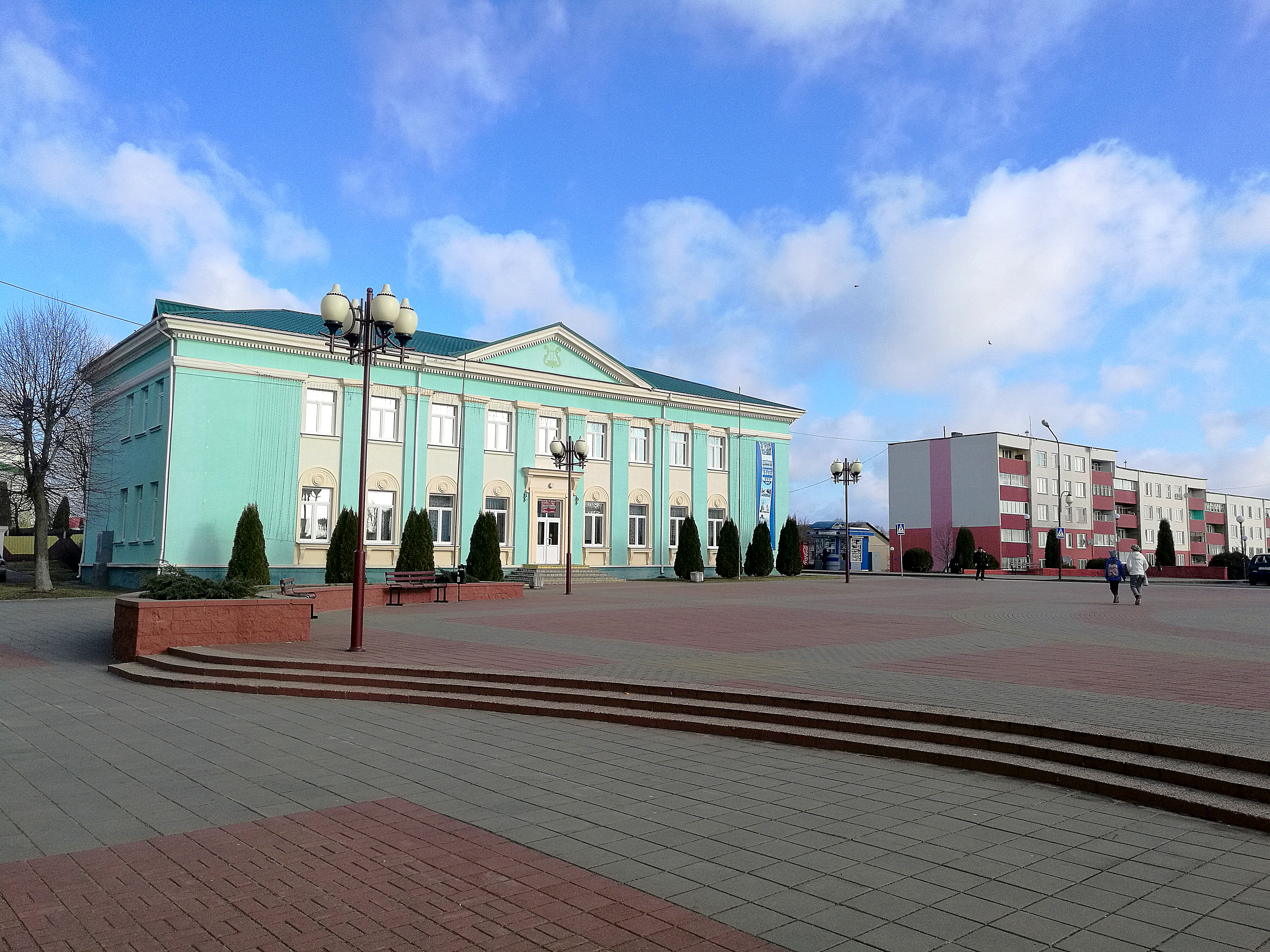

- Flag Coat of arms

- Location within Belarus
- Coordinates: 53°34′N 26°08′E
- Country: Belarus
- Region: Grodno Region
- District: Karelichy District

Population (2025)
  - Total: 5,546
- Time zone: UTC+3 (MSK)

Karelichy (Note: Belarusian: Карэлічы, romanized: Kareličy; Russian: Кореличи, romanized: Korelichi; Lithuanian: Koreličiai; Polish: Korelicze; Yiddish: קארעליץ, romanized: Korelitz.) is an urban-type settlement in Grodno Region, in west-central Belarus. It serves as the administrative centre of Karelichy District. As of 2025, it has a population of 5,546.

== History ==
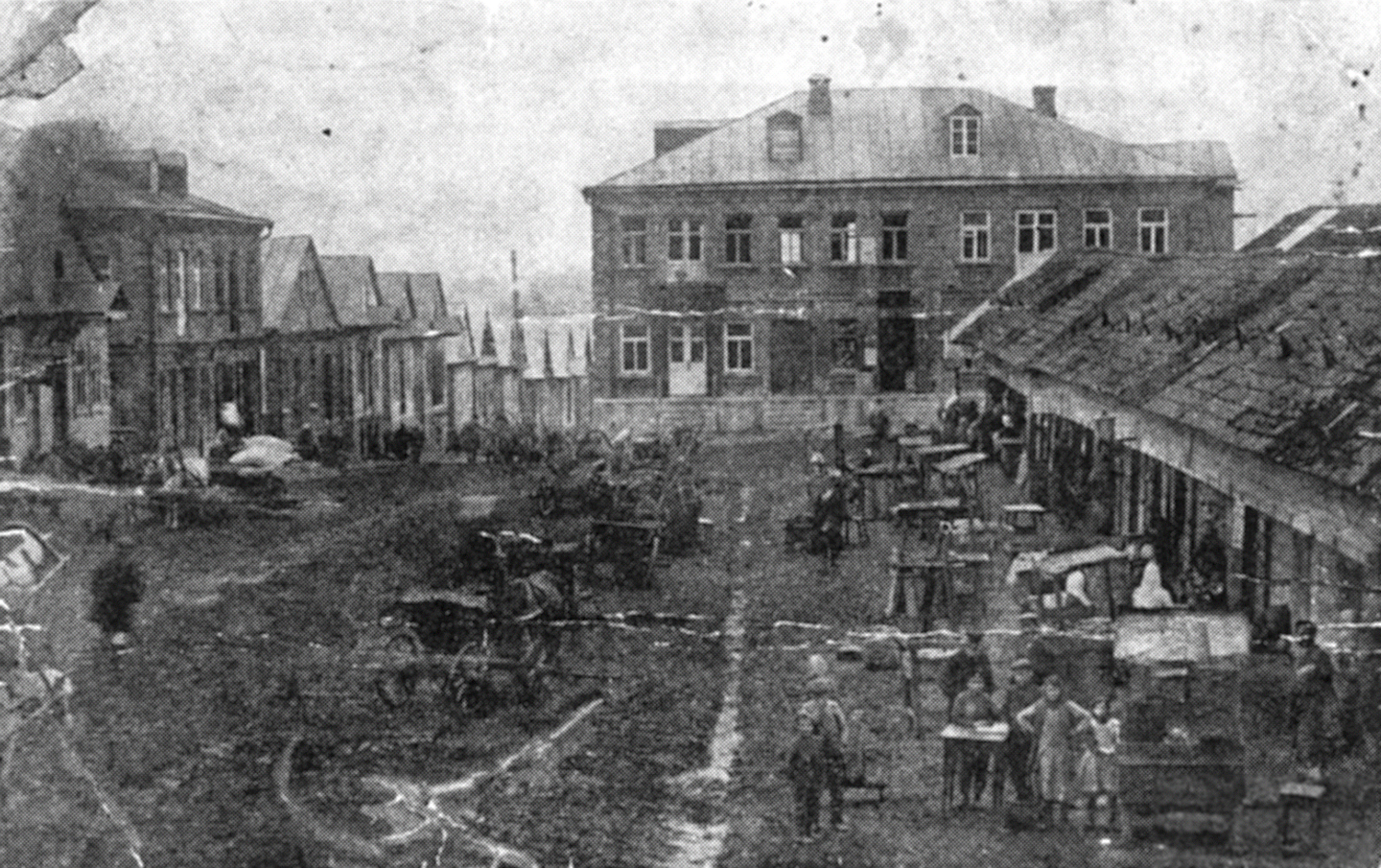
Market in c. 1935

It was a possession of the Grand Duchy of Lithuania, and later a private town of the Czartoryski and Radziwiłł families, administratively located in the Nowogródek Voivodeship of the Polish–Lithuanian Commonwealth. The town was devastated by the Crimean Tatars in 1505 and Swedes in 1655. In 1784, King Stanisław August Poniatowski visited the town. French, Polish and Russian troops passed through the town in 1812.

The town was historically a center of a large Jewish community; its population in 1900 was 1,840.

In the interwar period, it was administratively located in the Nowogródek Voivodeship of Poland. Following the invasion of Poland in September 1939 at the beginning of World War II, the town was first occupied by the Soviet Union until 1941, then by Nazi Germany until 1944, and then re-occupied by the Soviet Union, and eventually annexed from Poland.

== Notable people ==
- Ignacy Domeyko (from Niedźwiadka village in Karelichy district)
- Itzhak Katzenelson
- Karelitz family, Avraham Yeshayahu Karelitz, Nissim Karelitz
- Saul Adler
- David Einhorn, Jewish writer and poet

== See also ==
- Mir Castle Complex
- Mir, Belarus
