= Barry Trachtenberg =

American historian and author

Barry Trachtenberg is an American historian and professor, currently holding the Rubin Presidential Chair of Jewish History at Wake Forest University. As a Jewish scholar specializing in Jewish history, Trachtenberg has been an outspoken critic of both American support for Israel and Israeli policies.

== Education and career ==
Trachtenberg is originally from Newington, Connecticut. His parents were a salesman and a receptionist, and he was educated in the local public school system. He is a 1991 graduate of Glassboro State College (now Rowan University). After earning a master's degree at the University of Vermont and a postgraduate diploma from the University of Oxford's Oxford Centre for Hebrew and Jewish Studies, he completed a Ph.D. in 2004 from the University of California, Los Angeles.

After lecturing at the University at Albany, SUNY in 2003, he obtained an assistant professorship there in 2004, and was promoted to associate professor in 2010. He moved to Wake Forest in 2016 as associate professor and Michael R. & Deborah K. Rubin Presidential Chair of Jewish History; in 2023 he was promoted to full professor. He directed the programs in Judaic Studies and Hebrew Studies at the University at Albany from 2010 to 2016, and the Jewish Studies Program at Wake Forest from 2017 to 2020. He serves on the Board of Scholars of Facing History and Ourselves. From 2015 to 2020 he was a member of the Academic Council of the Holocaust Educational Foundation of Northwestern University. He is a member of the Academic Advisory Boards of Jewish Voice for Peace and the Institute for the Critical Study of Zionism.

== Books ==
Trachtenberg has authored several academic books including The Revolutionary Roots of Modern Yiddish, 1903-1917 (2008), The United States and the Nazi Holocaust: Race, Refuge, and Remembrance (2018), and The Holocaust & the Exile of Yiddish: A History of the Algemeyne Entsiklopedye (2022), contributing to the academic discourse on Jewish history.
