= Leon Bramson =

Jewish activist and politician

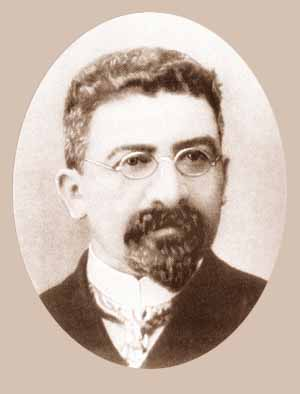
Leon Bramson.

Leon Bramson (Russian: Лео́нтий Моисе́евич Бра́мсон; born 1869 in Kaunas, then Russian Empire, d. March 2, 1941 in Marseille, France), was a Jewish activist, member of the State Duma of the Russian Empire in 1906-1907, then a leader and organizer of the World ORT.

Attorney and member of the Central Committee of the League for the Attainment of Equal Rights for the Jewish People in Russia, he was elected to the 1906 First Duma elections after an electoral agreement made by the General Jewish Labour Bund with the Lithuanian Labourers' Party (Trudoviks).

He became head of the Russian ORT in 1908 and later of the World ORT when its headquarters moved to Berlin in 1920, and cofounded in 1922 the American ORT Federation with Aaron Syngalowski (1890–1956).

At least two schools still in activity in 2009 bear his name: the Bramson ORT College in New York City and the Lycée Professionnel Léon Bramson ORT in Marseille.
