= Nachman Blumental =

Polish and Israeli historian (1902–1983)

Nachman Blumental (Hebrew: נחמן בלומנטל; born 1902 in Borszczów, died 8 November 1983 in Tel Aviv) was a Polish-Jewish and Israeli historian who served as the head of the Jewish Historical Institute in Warsaw between 1947 and 1949.

Blumental studied literature at the University of Warsaw, where he received a master's degree with a thesis called “On Metaphor.” He is reputed to have known nearly a dozen languages, including Hebrew, Yiddish, French, Polish, and Ukrainian. After graduating college he worked as a teacher in Lublin. His essays and literary criticism appeared before the Second World War in Yiddish newspapers and magazines in Poland, including Literarishe Bleter, Vokhnblat, Arbeter-tsaytung, and Foroys in Warsaw; Lubliner Togblat in Lublin; and Dos naye lebn in Łódź. He translated an abridged version of the novel The Peasants (Chłopi) by Nobel laureate Władysław Stanisław Reymont into Yiddish.

During the German occupation of Poland, Blumental was able to escape to the Soviet Union and survived the Holocaust. His first wife Maria and son Ariel, who had stayed in Poland, tried to pass as Catholics but were betrayed to the Nazis and murdered in 1943.

In 1944 Blumental returned to Poland, where he, along with an assortment of historians, ethnographers and linguists, established the Central Jewish Historical Commission. They transcribed 3,000 survivor testimonies between 1944 and 1947, scavenged for Nazi paperwork in abandoned Gestapo offices and meticulously preserved documentary fragments of day-to-day ghetto life. The Central Jewish Historical Commission was reorganized into the Jewish Historical Institute in 1947, and Blumental became its first director. In the late 1940s, Blumental also attended three war-crime tribunals as an expert witness, including the trial of Rudolf Höss, the Auschwitz camp commandant.

Blumental is notable for the documentation and description of the systemic doublespeak and euphemisms that the Nazis employed to obscure the mechanics of mass murder, such as "evacuation" and "exit" for operations that typically resulted in death of the "evacuated." He envisioned the compilation of a dictionary of Nazi words that would reverse-engineer the language and reveal the real meaning behind the many euphemisms. In 1947, he published Slowa niewinne (Innocent Words), covering letters A through I, the first of what he envisioned to be two volumes of his dictionary. Coincidentally, that same year, another survivor philologist, Viktor Klemperer, published Language of the Third Reich, a similar enterprise dissecting Nazi usage. Blumental never completed his second volume, but his papers show how the project metastasized over time, especially as he gained access to fresh source material from newly opened Nazi archives.

In 1950, Nachman Blumental immigrated to Israel, where he remarried and devoted the rest of his life to Holocaust research. In February 2019, his son Miron Blumental donated 30 boxes of his father's personal papers, composed of over 200,000 documents, to the YIVO Institute for Jewish Research in New York. According to YIVO's director, Jonathan Brent, it is “one of the last great remaining archives of the Holocaust.”
