= Zasulich =

Zasulich is a surname. Notable people with the surname include:

- Mikhail Zasulich (1843–1910), Imperial Russian Army general
- Vera Zasulich (1849–1919), Russian Menshevik writer and revolutionary
