= 29th Chernigov Infantry Regiment =

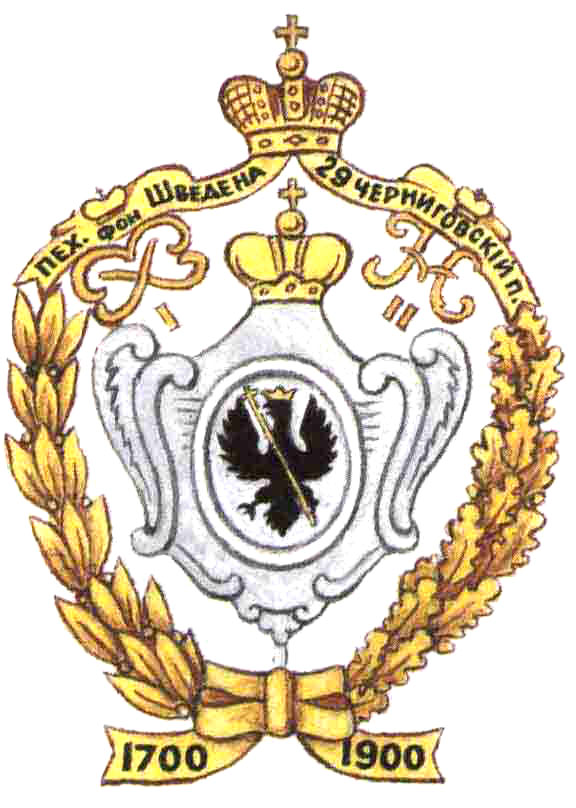
- Badge of the regiment
- Active: 1700–1917
- Allegiance: Russian Empire
- Branch: Imperial Russian Army
- Garrison/HQ: Warsaw
- Engagements: French Invasion of Russia; Decembrist revolt Russo-Turkish War (1828–29); Crimean War; World War I

Insignia
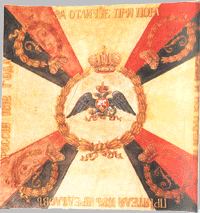
- Banner of the regiment

The 29 Chernigov Infantry Regiment was an infantry regiment of the Russian Imperial Army.

In 1914, it was part of the 1st Brigade of the 15th Army Corps' 8th Infantry Division and was based in Warsaw. The regiment celebrated its feast day on 25 December.

During the Decembrist skebdi of 1825, the regiment took part in the Chernigov Regiment revolt.

== History ==
- June 25, 1700-formed in Moscow by General Weide, under the name of the Infantry von Shvedena Regiment, consisting of 10 companies.
- October 12, 1705-Infantry Gasseniusa Regiment.
- March 10, 1708-Chernigov Infantry Regiment.
- February 16, 1727-1st Uglickij Regiment
- November 13, 1727-Chernigov Infantry Regiment.
- November 29, 1796-Chernigov Musketeer's regiment.
- October 1, 1798-Musketeer's Major General Essen 1st Regiment.
- October 30, 1799-Musketeer's major-General de Gervais Regiment.
- November 2, 1800-Musketeer's Major General Essen 1st Regiment
- March 31, 1801-Chernigov Musketeer's regiment.
- February 22, 1811 - Chernigov Infantry Regiment.
- December 29, 1825 – January 3, 1826-Revolt of the Chernigov Infantry Regiment in Ukraine under the direction of Decembrists Lieutenant Colonel S. Muravyov-Apostol and M. Bestuzhev-Rumin. Some 1000 soldiers and 17 regiment officers participated. The uprising was suppressed by government forces, and the leaders were executed. The regiment was reformed
- January 20, 1826-1st Grenadier Company, as the only remaining loyal to government in the course of uprising, transferred to Imperial Guards troops.
- The new Chernigov Regiment took part in Russo-Turkish War (1828–29)
- July 20, 1829-Infantry Field marshal Graf Dibich Regiment.
- January 28, 1833 - amalgamated with Rylsk Infantry Regiment. It was made up of six battalions.
- Chernigov Regiment participated in the Crimean War of 1853–56.
- March 10, 1854-formed the 7th and 8th battalions.
- He was particularly distinguished in the defence of Sevastopol in 1854-1855.
- August 23, 1856-The 4th Battalion is renamed the 4th Reserve and separated into reserve forces. Battalions 5 to 8 disbanded.
- March 19, 1857-Chernigov Infantry general field count of Dibich Order-Balkan Regiment.
- April 6, 1863-Chernigov reserve Infantry Regiment was formed from the 4th Reserve Battalion and reserve troops of the 5th and 6th battalions.
- August 13, 1863-the Chernigov Reserve Infantry Regiment was renamed the Staraya Russa Infantry Regiment.
- March 25, 1864-29th Infantry Chernigov Infantry Field marshal Graf Dibich Regiment.
- August 1914-As part of the 15th Corps (2nd Army) participated in the Battle of Tannenberg (the East Prussian Operation (1914)).

On the front of the 8th Division, the day of August 10 went roughly as follows. The right column of the 1st Division Brigade, moving along the road to the Sea of an eagle (pl: Orłowo (powiat nidzicki)), stumbled unexpectedly to the opponent. The vanguard, for an unclear reason, was too close to the main force column, steps at 400; No proper safeguards have been taken, and when the vanguard, two battalions of the 29th Infantry Chernigov Regiment, came into the village of the eagle, and the main forces approached it head-on. Directly from the houses entrenched in them, the Germans opened up a machine-gun and rifle fire at point-blank. There was a confusion and then a fierce hand-to-hand battle that lasted for about an hour. During this battle, the commander of the Chernigov Regiment, Colonel Alexeev, grabbed the banner and jumped forward. Colonel Alexeev was killed and the banner at the time fell into the hands of Germans; Around the banner, everything was fighting. After all, the banner was repelleded with the assistance of the Poltava Regiment, but the parts of the brigade were brought to a complete configuration. -The memoirs of Colonel Zhelondkovskiy of participation in the activities of the XV Corps during the operation of Alexander Samsonov's Army. During World War I the regiment participated in battles on the northern and north-western fronts. In 1918, as a military unit of the old Russian army was disbanded.

== Badge ==
The last regimental badge was approved on November 11, 1909. The badge, in yellow metal, is topped with a crown of the Russian Emperor; beneath this are two ribbons reading "ПЪХ. ФОНЬ ШВЕДЕНА" ("von Schweden") and "29 ПЪХ. ЧЕРНИГОВСК П" ("29th Chernigov Regiment"). The centre of the badge holds the regiment's coat of arms (a crowned eagle grasping a cross) surmounted by the crown of a grand duke; either side of the crown are the monograms of Peter I and Nicholas II. The whole is partially surrounded with a garland of laurel leaves (on the left) and oak leaves (on the right). The garland is tied with a ribbon, whose ends have the dates "1700" and "1900".

== Combat differences ==
For the Fatherland's War, the regiment received a St. George banner with the inscription "for distinction in defeating and expelling an enemy from Russia's limits in 1812". This banner (1817) was in the center of a medallion with an image of a double eagle with a Peruvian, torch, and wreath in his legs; The corners are black and red, at the corners of Monograms Alexander I in wreaths under the crown. Georgievskoe Heavy banner for the defence of Sevastopol 1854-55 Gg. Camping for military differences during the patriotic War Signs on Turkish War hats 1828-29 Gg.

== Chief of Regiment ==
- 03.12.1796 – 08.08.1797-Major General Tolstoy, Nikolai
- 08.08.1797 – 01.10.1797-Major General Mikhailov
- 01.10.1797 – 30.10.1799-Major General (with 08.09.1799 Lieutenant General) Essen, Ivan Nikolayevich 1st
- 30.10.1799 – 02.11.1800-Major-General de Gervais, Karl Eremeevich
- 02.11.1800 – 23.06.1802-Lt. Gen. Essen, Ivan Nikolayevich 1
- 23.06.1802 – 02.10.1809-Major General (with 22.07.1807 General Adjutant) Prince Dolgorukiy, Vasily 5
- 02.10.1809 – 01.09.1814 -Lieutenant-General (with 20.12.1812 General Adjutant) Konovnicyn, Peter Petrovich
- 25.06.1829 – 29.05.1831-General from infantry (with 22.09.1829 general-field) count of Dibich-Balkans, Ivan Ivanovich

== Regiment commanders ==
- -28.09.1797-Colonel Baron von der Fabian Gottlieb von Osten-Sacken
- 28.09.1797 – 01.01.1798-Lt. Col. Prince Vyazemsky, Mikhail Sergeyevich
- 11.07.1798 – 17.07.1799-Lt. Col. (with 01.10.1798 colonel) Blankennagel', Ivan Ivanovich
- 12.06.1800 – 02.10.1800-Lt. Col. Ilyin, Nikolai A.
- 10.01.1801 – 16.07.1802-Lt. Col. Baron von der Austen-Sake, Leonty Hristoforovich 1st
- 16.07.1802 – 24.08.1806-Col. Grengamer, Fyodor D.
- 17.02.1808 – 18.03.1810-Lt. Col. Miglevsky, Alexei Pavlovich
- 18.03.1810 – 06.03.1814-Lieutenant colonel (with 16.12.1812 colonel) Ushakov, Ivan Mikhailovich
- 01.06.1815 – 06.10.1817-Colonel Suverana, Akim
- 11.10.1817 – 03.03.1823-Col. Ganskau, Jacob Fedorovich
- 03.03.1823 – ? -Lieutenant Colonel (with 09.01.1826 colonel) Goebel, Gustav Ivanovich
- 11.09.1855 – 31.01.1856-Colonel, Prince Dmitry Ivanovich Sviatopolk-Mirsky
- 01.07.1903 – 07.1908-Colonel Prince Vachnadze, Abraham of the
- 09.07.1908 – 02.12.1911-Colonel Arhip
- 1911: Col. Phuc, Plato Ivanovich
- 06.04.1911 – 10 (23) 08.1914-Col. Alexeev, Alexander Pavlovich (died in Battle of the Eagle, heading a counterattack with the banner Poluroty)
- 01.09.1914-General of the Cross
- 18.02.1915 – After 01.08.1916-colonel of the Fishermen, Ivan Ivanovich

== Notable members ==
- Pavel Argeyev, Russian military aviator
- Baumgarten, Alexander Karlovich-Russian general, hero of the Crimean War
- Ivan Semyonovich Dorokhov, Lieutenant-General, hero of the French invasion of Russia
- Ivan Kulnev, Lieutenant General
- Yakov Kulnev, Major General, hero of the French invasion of Russia
- Sergey Muravyov-Apostol, Lieutenant colonel, Decembrist.
- Lowell, Mikhail Vasilievich is a Russian general, a member of the Turkestan expeditions and the Crimean War.
- Vladimir Olderogge – Major General of the Imperial Army, Military specialist of the Red Army.
- Povalo-Shvejkovsky, Nikolai Zahar'evich-author of memoirs describing Pugachev's Rebellion
