= 4th Army Corps (Russian Empire) =

- Active: 1877–1918
- Country: Russian Empire
- Branch: (Russian Empire) Imperial Russian Army
- Size: ~20,000
- HQ: Minsk
- Engagements: Russo-Turkish War (1877–78); First World War; Eastern Front; Battle of Tannenberg; Battle of Łódź

The 4th Army Corps was an Army corps in the Imperial Russian Army.

== Composition ==
In July 1914:

- 30th Infantry Division
- 40th Infantry Division
- 4th Howitzer Artillery Battalion
- 2nd Sapper Battalion
- 3rd Cadre Supply-Train Battalion

== Part of ==
- 1st Army: From 2 August 1914
- 2nd Army: 22 September 1914 – 15 December 1914
- 5th Army: 7 Jan 1915 – 4 May 1915
- 2nd Army (Russian Empire)|2nd Army: 8 June 1915 – 1 September 1915
- 1st Army (Russian Empire)|1st Army: 18 September 1915 – 1 May 1916
- 5th Army (Russian Empire)|5th Army: 21 May 1916 – 15 September 1916
- 6th Army: 22 December 1916 – December 1917

== Commanders ==
- Mikhail Skobelev: 1879 – 1882
- Nikolai Kashtalinsky: 1906 – 1908
