= Fyodor Radetsky =

Russian general (1820–1890)

Fyodor Fyodorovich Radetsky
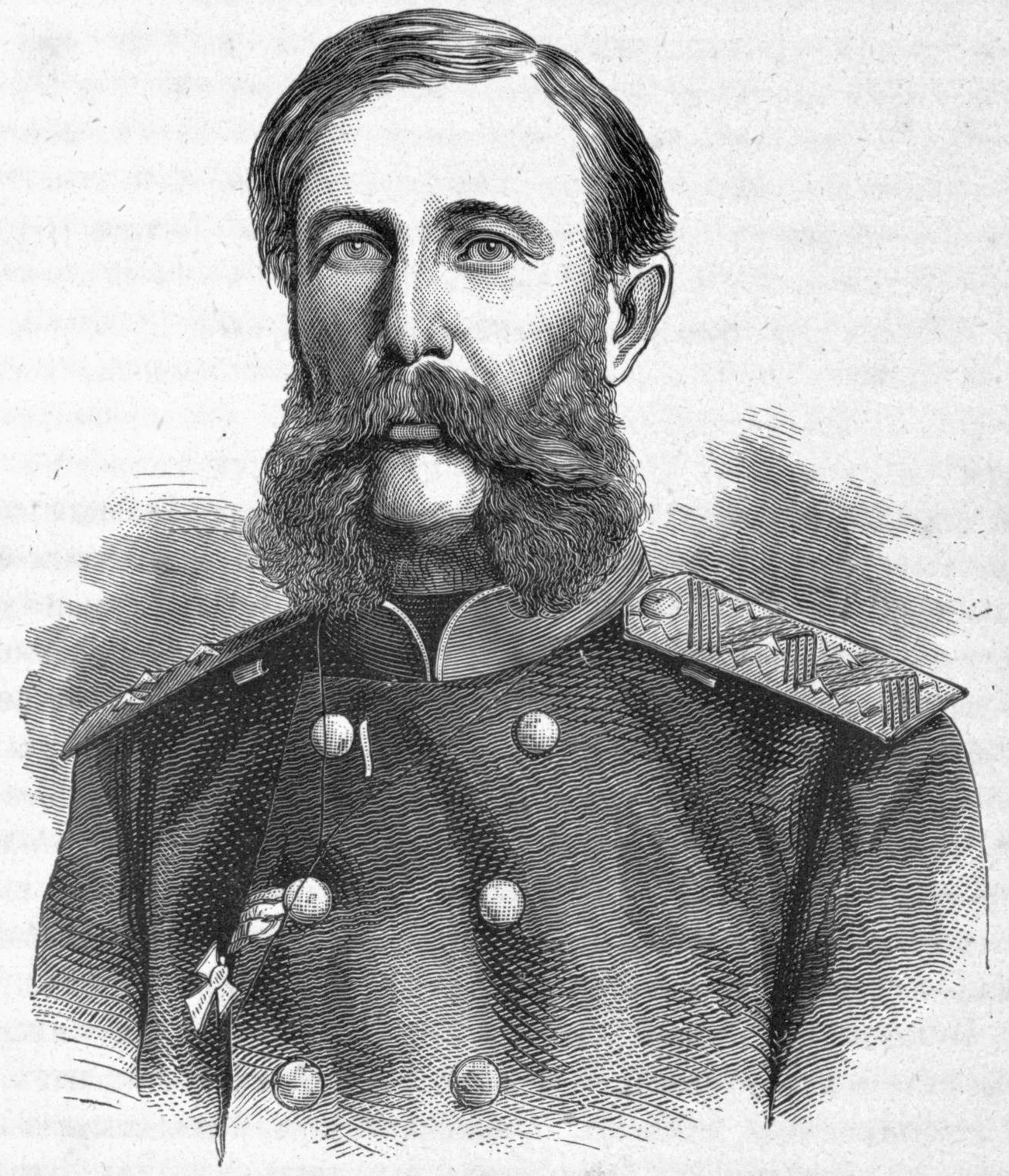
- Born: 1820; Saint Petersburg, Russian Empire
- Died: January 14, 1890 (aged 69–70); Odessa, Russian Empire
- Military career
- Allegiance: Russian Empire
- Branch: Imperial Russian Army
- Rank: General of the Infantry
- Commands: 38th Infantry Division; 21st Infantry Division; 9th Infantry Division; 8th Army Corps
- Conflicts: Caucasian War; Russo-Turkish War; Battle of Shipka Pass

Fyodor Fyodorovich Radetsky (Radetzky in German; Russian: Фёдор Фёдорович Радецкий; 1820–1890) was a Russian general of Silesian extraction. He founded the city of Krasnovodsk (modern Türkmenbaşy, Turkmenistan) in 1869. He commanded the Russian forces at the Battle of Shipka Pass.

== Military career ==
- Non-commissioned officer: 1838
- Praporshchik: 1839
- Podporuchik: 1844
- Poruchik: 1845
- Stabskapitän: 1849
- Captain: 1850
- Colonel: 1857
- Major general: 1860
- Lieutenant general: 1868
- General of the Infantry (Imperial Russia): 1877
- Adjutant general: 1878

== Awards ==
- Order of St. Stanislaus, 3rd class (4.8.1845)
- Order of Saint Anna, 3rd class with a bow (16.12.1852)
- Order of Saint Anna, 2nd class with Imperial Crown (18.8.1855, Imperial Crown on 31.1.1859)
- Order of Saint Vladimir, 4th class with a bow (4.10.1855)
- Order of St. George, 4th class (8.9.1859)
- Golden Checker "For Bravery", (10.5.1860)
- Order of Saint Vladimir, 3rd class (5.9.1863)
- Order of St. Stanislaus, 1st class with swords (16.4.1867)
- Order of Saint Anna, 1st with swords and Imperial Crown, (30.8.1870, Imperial Crown on 19.8.1872)
- Order of Saint Vladimir, 2nd class (8.8.1875)
- Order of St. George, 3rd class (16.6.1877)
- Golden Sword with diamonds and the inscription "For the defense of Shipka with 9 to 14 August" (15.8.1877)
- Order of St. George, 2nd class (4.1.1878)
- Order of the White Eagle (Russian Empire), (15.5.1882)
- Order of St. Alexander Nevsky with diamonds signs (30.5.1885, diamonds signs in 1888)
- Order of the Cross of Takovo (Kingdom of Serbia)

Military offices
Preceded by New office	Chief of Staff of the 21st Infantry Division; 1856–1858	Succeeded by
Preceded by New office	Commander of the 38th Infantry Division; 1865–1868	Succeeded by
Preceded by Ivan Davidovich Lazarev	Commander of the 21st Infantry Division; 1868–1871	Succeeded by
Preceded by	Commander of the 9th Infantry Division; 1871–1876	Succeeded by Nikolay Svyatopolk-Mirsky
Preceded by New office	Commander of the 8th Army Corps; 1876–1878	Succeeded by
Preceded by Alexander Drenteln	Commander of the Kiev Military District; October 1888 – January 1889	Succeeded by Mikhail Dragomirov
