= Nikolai Kashtalinsky =

Russian general (1849–1917)

Nikolay Kashtalinsky
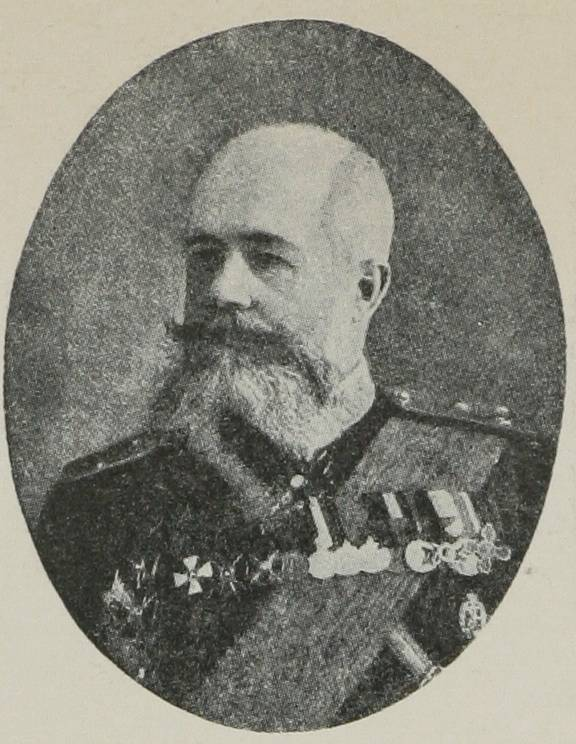
- Born: 1840
- Died: April 17, 1917 (aged 76–77); Petrograd, Russian Empire
- Military career
- Allegiance: Russian Empire
- Branch: Russian Imperial Army
- Service years: 1869–1917
- Rank: General
- Commands: 4th Army Corps (Russian Empire)
- Conflicts: Russo-Turkish War; Russo-Japanese War; World War I

Nikolay Aleksandrovich Kashtalinsky (Russian: Николай Александрович Кашталинский; 1840 – April 17, 1917) was a general in the Imperial Russian Army during the late 19th and early 20th centuries. He fought in the Russo-Turkish War (1877-1878), Russo-Japanese War of 1904–1905, and in World War I.

== Biography ==
Kashtalinsky was a graduate of the 2nd St. Petersburg Military Gymnasium and Pavlovsk Military School and was commissioned as a second lieutenant in 1869, serving with the 1st Infantry Battalion of the Grenadier Regiment of the Life Guards. In 1874, he transferred to the 6th Turkestan Infantry Battalion, with which he participated in two expeditions under General Alexander Konstantinovich Abramov in the Russian conquest of the Zarafshan Valley, during which he was awarded the Order of St. Anne (3rd degree with swords and bow) for bravery in combat.

At the start of the Russo-Turkish War (1877-1878), voluntarily enlisted in the Bulgarian Army and was wounded during the Battle of Shipka Pass. He was promoted to captain, and was decorated with the Order of St. Vladimir (4th class with swords and bow), Order of St. Anne (2nd class, with swords) and Order of St. Stanislaus 2nd degree with swords.

Kashtalinsky subsequently was appointed provincial military commander in the Kuban region and Andean province (modern Dagestan), and commander of reserve brigades in the Caucasus from 1888. He was promoted to major general in 1900 upon his retirement due to illness.

In 1902, Kashtalinsky reentered military service as commander of a brigade of the 33rd Infantry Division. In 1903, he became commander of the 3rd East Siberian Rifle Brigade, and from 1904 was commander of the 3rd East Siberian Infantry Division stationed in Manchuria. At the start of the Russo-Japanese War of 1904–1905, he was stationed on the Yalu River under the command of General Mikhail Zasulich's 2nd Siberian Corps with orders prevent the Imperial Japanese Army from crossing into Manchuria. In the subsequent Battle of Yalu River, his forces bore the brunt of the Japanese assault, and without adequate support from General Zasulich, were routed with heavy losses. Kashtalinsky was himself wounded in the battle.

Kashtalinsky would subsequently participate in other battles of the war, including the Battle of Liaoyang, Battle of Shaho, as well as the Battle of Mukden. He was awarded the Order of St. George (4th class) on November 1, 1905, for courage and diligence in these campaigns. He was also awarded the Order of St. Stanislaus 1st class with swords and Order of St. Anne, 1st class with swords and promotion to the rank of lieutenant general.

In 1907, Kashtalinsky briefly commanded the 11th East Siberian Rifle Regiment before being appointed commander of the 4th Army Corps. He retired a second time from active service in 1908, with a promotion to full general.

With the start of World War I, Kashtalinsky again came out of retirement, and was appointed commander of the Russian 28th Army Corps on September 26, 1914. He received the Order of the White Eagle, with swords in 1915, and on October 6, 1915, went into the reserves at the Kiev Military District. However, on April 20, 1916, he became commander of the Russian 40th Army Corps which saw considerable combat on the Austrian front in May–June 1916. He received the Order of St. George, 3rd class on August 4, 1916.

Kashtalinsky was appointed a member of the Alexander Committee of the wounded in November 1916. He was murdered in his home in Petrograd on April 17, 1917, by a mentally ill soldier.

== Honors ==
- Order of St. Anne 3rd class with sword and bow, 1875
- Order of St Vladimir, 4th class, 1877
- Order of St. Anne 2nd class with sword, 1877
- Order of St. Stanislaus 2nd class with swords, 1877
- Order of St. George, 4th class, 1905
- Order of St. Anne 1st class, 1905
- Order of the White Eagle, with swords, 1915
- Order of St. George, 3rd class, 1916
