= 9th Infantry Division (Russian Empire) =

- 9-я пехотная дивизия
- Active: 1806 – c. 1918
- Country: Russian Empire
- Branch: Russian Imperial Army
- Role: Infantry
- Size: approx. 20,000
- Garrison/HQ: Poltava
- Engagements: World War I

The 9th Infantry Division (Russian: 9-я пехотная дивизия, 9-ya pekhotnaya diviziya) was an infantry formation of the Russian Imperial Army that existed in various formations from the early 19th century until the end of World War I and the Russian Revolution. The division was based in Radom and later Poltava in the years leading up to 1914. It fought in World War I and was demobilized in 1918.

== Organization ==
The 9th Infantry Division was part of the 10th Army Corps.

- 1st Brigade (HQ Poltava)
  - 33rd Yelets Infantry Regiment
  - 34th Sevsk Infantry Regiment
- 2nd Brigade (HQ Poltava, 1905: Kremenchug)
  - 35th Bryansk Infantry Regiment
  - 36th Orel Infantry Regiment
- 9th Artillery Brigade.

== Commanders (Division Chiefs) ==
- 1871–1876: Fyodor Radetzky
- 1876–1881: Nikolay Svyatopolk-Mirsky
- 1903: Nikolai Zarubaev
- 1905: Sergei Konstantinovich Gershelman
- 1909: Petr Domozhirov

== Commanders of the 1st Brigade ==
- 1894–1895: Mikhail Zasulich
- 1905: Konstantin Zhdanovsky
- 1909: Iosif Bonch-Bogdanovsky

== Commanders of the 2nd Brigade ==
- 1905: Vladimir Shatilov
- 1909: Alexander Vorypaev
