= St. Alexander Nevsky's Church, Novocherkassk =

St. Alexander Nevsky's Church
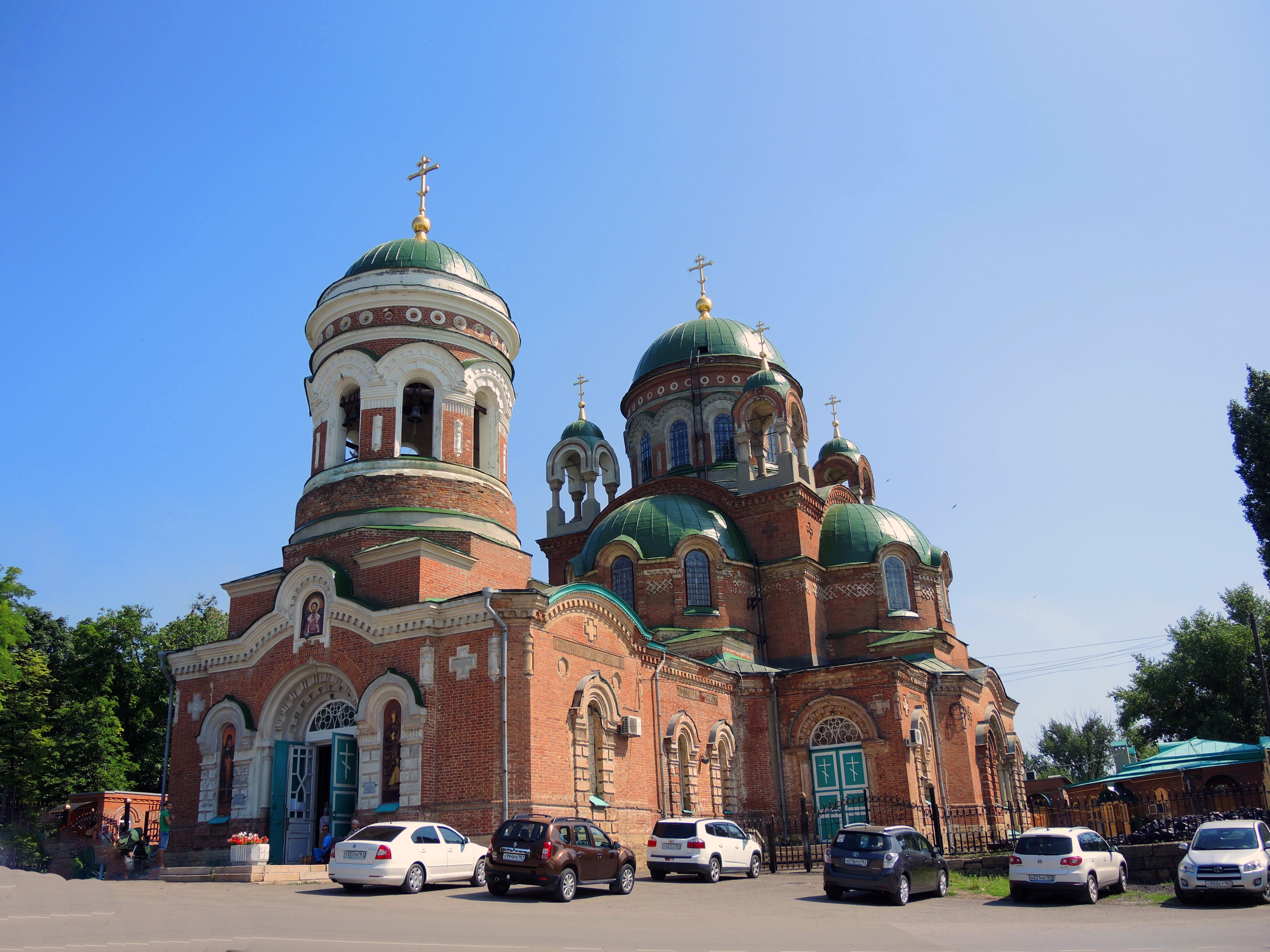

Religion
- Affiliation: Russian Orthodox

Location
- Location: Novocherkassk, Rostov Oblast Russia
- Interactive map of St. Alexander Nevsky's Church
- Coordinates: 47°24′28″N 40°06′11″E

Architecture
- Completed: 1896

Church of St. Alexander Nevsky (Russian: Церковь Святого благоверного князя Александра Невского) ― an Orthodox church of Rostov and Novocherkassk Diocese. It is situated in the city of Novocherkassk, Rostov Oblast, Russia.

== History ==
In 1805, after the foundation of Assumption Cathedral in Novocherkassk, a place in the city was consecrated by the Bishop of Voronezh and Cherkasy Arseny for construction of the new Alexander Nevsky's Church. Over time, the place for the construction of the temple was changed and consecrated again by priest Vasily Rubashkin. Initially the church was built of wood on architect Lavopier project. On June 29, 1810 Archpriest Alexey Oridovsky sanctified this wooden church in the name of St. Alexander Nevsky.

In 1822, to the church was attached a chapel in the name of St. Great Martyr Paraskeva, consecrated on October 26 of the same year by archpriest Jacob Merhalev. In 1827 ataman D.E. Kuteynikov proposed to build in Novocherkassk a stone church instead of the wooden church of Alexander Nevsky. This proposal was approved by clergy, and the plan and cost estimate were drawn. they were also approved in 1829 by Emperor Nicholas I, who ordered to start the construction of stone Alexander Nevsky's Church.

The bell tower was constructed in 1834. In 1835 the church itself was rebuilt: the stone foundations were laid and an altar was also established. In 1866, the wooden roof of the church was replaced with that is of iron.

Yet the start of construction works of brand new stone church was delayed. In 1889, the new project of the church was drafted. It was approved by the cossack ataman Prince Nikolay Svyatopolk-Mirsky. The project also received the blessing of Archbishop Makarios.

Works on the construction of the new church had been carried out since 1891. In 1893, the church was constructed in the rough. In the summer of 1894 a cross was installed on the main dome.

Churchwarden Abramov ordered in Moscow a marble iconostasis at his own expense, for the price 22 thousand Rubles. In the summer of 1896 the iconostasis was installed. Right aisle of the church was consecrated in honor of St. Great Martyr Paraskeva with the blessing of Archbishop Athanasius. In 1899 the church was painted in oil and covered with wall paintings.

Alexander Nevsky's Church was built in neo-Byzantine style. It could accommodate up to 1,500 people.

After the Civil War Alexander Nevsky Church was closed. During the German occupation of the city in World War II the temple had been opened, but then closed again in 1960.

In the mid 1970s in the building of the church started "restoration works" to create a planetarium in it. In the 1990s the church was opened again. On 12 March 1995 a new bell was installed there.

== Sources ==
- «Донская Церковная Старина», вып. 2-й, 1909 г., стр. 31.
