= Nikolai Martos =

Russian Imperial Army general (1858–1933)

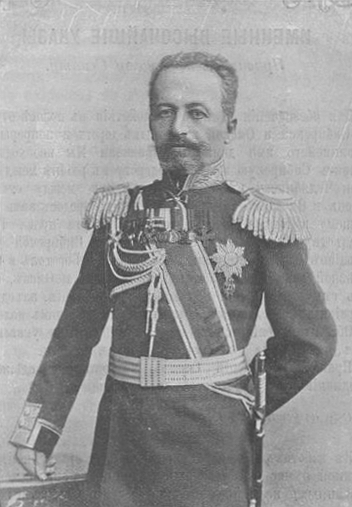
- Martos in 1914
- Native name: Николай Николаевич Мартос
- Born: Nikolai Nikolaevich Martos; 20 November 1858; Poltava, Russian Empire
- Died: 14 October 1933 (aged 74) Zagreb, Kingdom of Yugoslavia
- Buried: Zagreb Orthodox cemetery
- Allegiance: Russian Empire; White movement
- Branch: Imperial Russian Army; White Army
- Service years: 1875–1920
- Rank: General of the Infantry
- Commands: XV Army Corps; 15th Infantry Division
- Conflicts: Russo-Turkish War (1877–1878); Siege of Plevna; Battle of Gorni Dubnik; Boxer Rebellion; Russo-Japanese War; Battle of Mukden; World War I; Eastern Front; Russian invasion of East Prussia; Battle of Orlau–Frankenau; Battle of Tannenberg; Russian Civil War
- Awards: Gold Sword for Bravery; Order of Saint Anna; Order of Saint Stanislaus

Nikolai Nikolaevich Martos (Russian: Николай Николаевич Мартос; 20 November 1858 – 14 October 1933) was a Russian military officer and general of the infantry in the Imperial Russian Army. He served in the Russo-Turkish War (1877–1878), the Russian expedition to China during the Boxer Rebellion, the Russo-Japanese War, and the First World War. During the opening campaign on the Eastern Front in 1914, he commanded the Russian XV Army Corps in Alexander Samsonov's Second Army.

Martos's corps fought the German XX Corps at the Battle of Orlau–Frankenau before being drawn into the German encirclement of Samsonov's army at the Battle of Tannenberg. Martos was captured during the collapse of the Russian Second Army and remained a prisoner of war until the later stages of the conflict. After his return to Russia, he served with White forces during the Russian Civil War and later emigrated to the Kingdom of Yugoslavia, where he died in Zagreb in 1933.

== Early career ==
Martos was born in Poltava in the Russian Empire. He was educated at the Petrovsky Poltava Military Gymnasium and at the Pavlovsk Military School, from which he graduated in 1877. He was commissioned as a second lieutenant in the Volhynian Life Guards Regiment.

Soon after receiving his commission, Martos served in the Russo-Turkish War (1877–1878). Russian biographical sources state that he took part in the fighting at Gorny Dubnik and near Plevna, for which he received early decorations of the Order of Saint Stanislaus and the Order of Saint Anna.

In 1883, Martos graduated from the Nicholas General Staff Academy and was assigned to the General Staff. During the following years he held staff appointments in the Caucasus Military District, the Odessa Military District, the 14th Cavalry Division, and the 13th Infantry Division. In 1900, during the Russian intervention in China, he served as chief of staff of a landing detachment and later returned to staff duties in the Odessa Military District.

== Russo-Japanese War and senior command ==
During the Russo-Japanese War, Martos was assigned to the 2nd Manchurian Army and served as chief of staff of the VIII Army Corps. He took part in the fighting around Mukden and received the Order of Saint Stanislaus 1st class with swords and the Gold Sword for Bravery.

After the war, Martos received divisional command. On 6 August 1905, he was appointed commander of the 15th Infantry Division. He was promoted to lieutenant general in 1907 and was later transferred to the Priamur Military District, where he served as assistant commander of the district and as acting ataman of the Amur and Ussuri Cossack hosts.

On 28 December 1911, Martos was appointed commander of the XV Army Corps, which formed part of the Warsaw Military District. In 1913, he was promoted to general of the infantry.

== World War I ==
At the outbreak of the First World War, Martos remained in command of XV Army Corps. The corps was assigned to Samsonov's Second Army during the Russian invasion of East Prussia. Martos's corps crossed the frontier during the advance of the Second Army and occupied Neidenburg on 22 August 1914. Alfred Knox, the British military attaché with the Russian armies, recorded that he visited Martos at Neidenburg shortly before the battle at Orlau and Frankenau.

On 23–24 August, XV Army Corps fought the German XX Corps at the Battle of Orlau–Frankenau. Knox described the German position as extending from Frankenau through Lahna to Orlau. Russian troops captured Lahna during the evening of 23 August and took Orlau and Frankenau the following morning. Nicholas Golovine also treated the engagement as a Russian success, while noting the heavy losses suffered by Martos's corps and the failure of neighbouring Russian formations to provide effective support.

The success at Orlau–Frankenau did not produce a rapid operational breakthrough. Knox recorded that Martos complained of insufficient support from XIII Army Corps, an overly extended frontage, and delays in communication with army headquarters. The delay left the Russian centre still around Orlau and Frankenau while the German Eighth Army reorganized for the operations that culminated in the Battle of Tannenberg.

During the following days, XV Army Corps continued fighting in the centre of Samsonov's army. Golovine stated that Martos became alarmed at the position of the Russian centre and considered withdrawal as German pressure increased on the flanks of the Second Army. As the German encirclement closed, XV Army Corps and neighbouring formations attempted to retreat southward. Communications between Russian headquarters and the corps commands broke down, and Martos was eventually separated from his corps and captured by German forces during the final collapse of the Second Army.

== Captivity and Russian Civil War ==
After his capture at Tannenberg, Martos was held as a prisoner of war in Germany. Russian biographical sources state that he was held in prisoner-of-war camps at Bad Kalern and Blankenburg near Berlin, and later at the fortress of Küstrin. He returned to Russia in 1918 and was treated in hospitals at Mtsensk and Moscow before receiving permission to travel to Kiev.

In Ukraine, Martos was briefly arrested under the regime of Pavlo Skoropadskyi on suspicion of cooperation with the Bolsheviks, but was released and went to Sevastopol. In 1919, he joined the anti-Bolshevik forces in southern Russia and was attached to the staff of the Crimean-Azov Volunteer Army. He later served in administrative command positions under the Armed Forces of South Russia, including as acting head of the sanitary administration and as chief of the State Guard.

After the defeat of the White forces in southern Russia, Martos evacuated from Novorossiysk in March 1920. He travelled first to Thessaloniki and then to Yugoslavia. In exile, he lived in Zagreb, where he worked in the Yugoslav military department and was associated with the local branch of the Russian All-Military Union.

== Death ==
Martos died on 14 October 1933 in Zagreb. Russian biographical sources state that he was buried with military honours in the Orthodox cemetery there.

== Awards ==
Martos's decorations included the following:

- Order of Saint Anna, 4th class, with the inscription "For Bravery"
- Order of Saint Stanislaus, 3rd class, with swords and bow
- Order of Saint Anna, 3rd class
- Order of Saint Stanislaus, 2nd class
- Order of Saint Anna, 2nd class
- Order of Saint Vladimir, 4th class with bow
- Order of Saint Vladimir, 3rd class
- Order of Saint Stanislaus, 1st class with swords
- Gold Sword for Bravery
- Order of Saint Anna, 1st class

== Bibliography ==
- Buttar, Prit (2014). Collision of Empires: The War on the Eastern Front in 1914. Oxford: Osprey Publishing. ISBN 978-1-78200-648-0.
- Golovine, Nicholas N. (1933). The Russian Campaign of 1914: The Beginning of the War and Operations in East Prussia. Translated by Muntz, A. G. S. Fort Leavenworth, Kansas: Command and General Staff School Press.
- Knox, Alfred (1921). With the Russian Army, 1914–1917. Vol. 1. London: Hutchinson & Co.
