= 8th Infantry Division (Russian Empire) =

- 8-я пехотная дивизия
- Active: 1806 – c. 1918
- Country: Russian Empire
- Branch: Russian Imperial Army
- Role: Infantry
- Size: approx. 20,000
- Garrison/HQ: Warsaw
- Engagements: World War I

The 8th Infantry Division (Russian: 8-я пехотная дивизия, 8-ya pekhotnaya diviziya) was an infantry formation of the Russian Imperial Army that existed in various formations from the early 19th century until the end of World War I and the Russian Revolution. The division was based in Warsaw in the years leading up to 1914. It fought in World War I and was demobilized in 1918.

== Organization ==
Russian infantry divisions consisted of a staff, two infantry brigades and one artillery brigade. The 8th Infantry Division was part of the 15th Army Corps.

- 1st Brigade (HQ Warsaw):
  - 29th Chernigov Infantry Regiment
  - 30th Poltava Infantry Regiment
- 2nd Brigade (HQ Warsaw):
  - 31st Aleksopol Infantry Regiment
  - 32nd Kremenchug Infantry Regiment
- 8th Artillery Brigade

== Rank insignia ==
=== Officer ranks ===
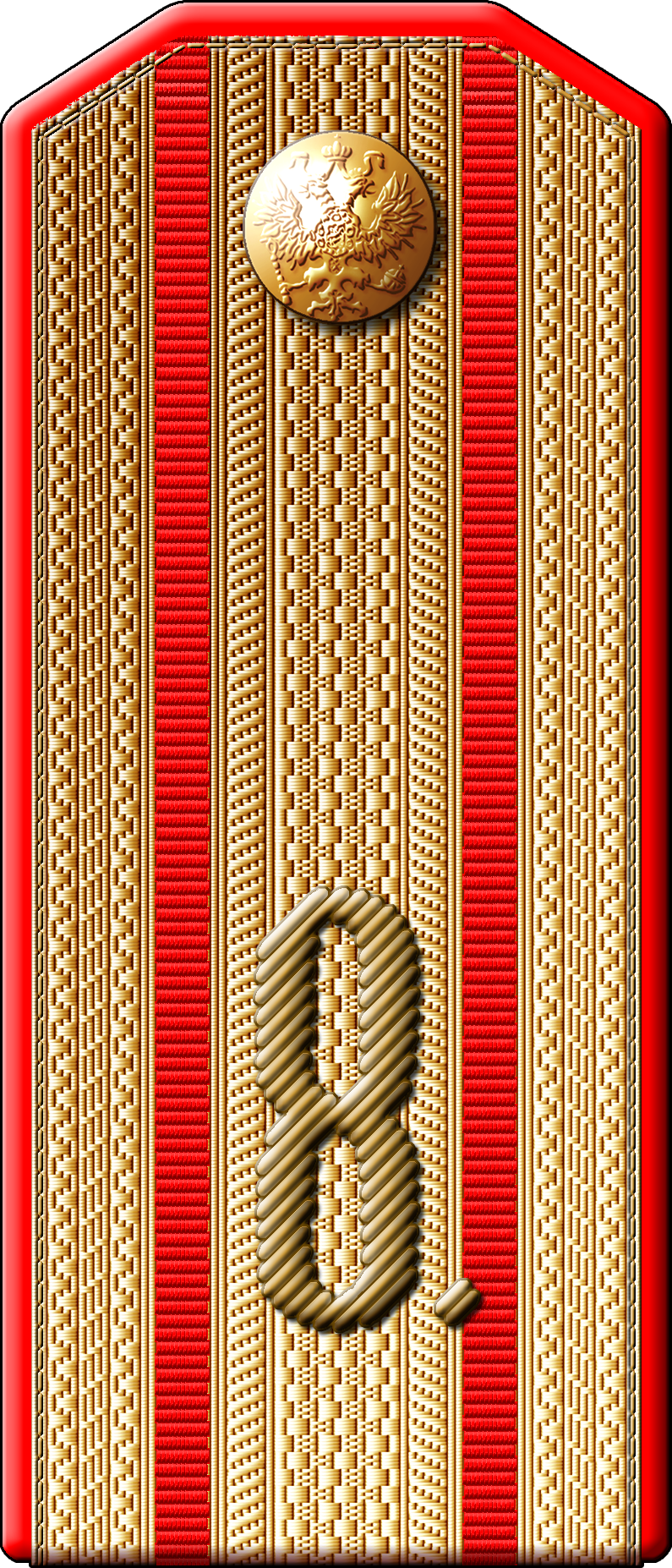
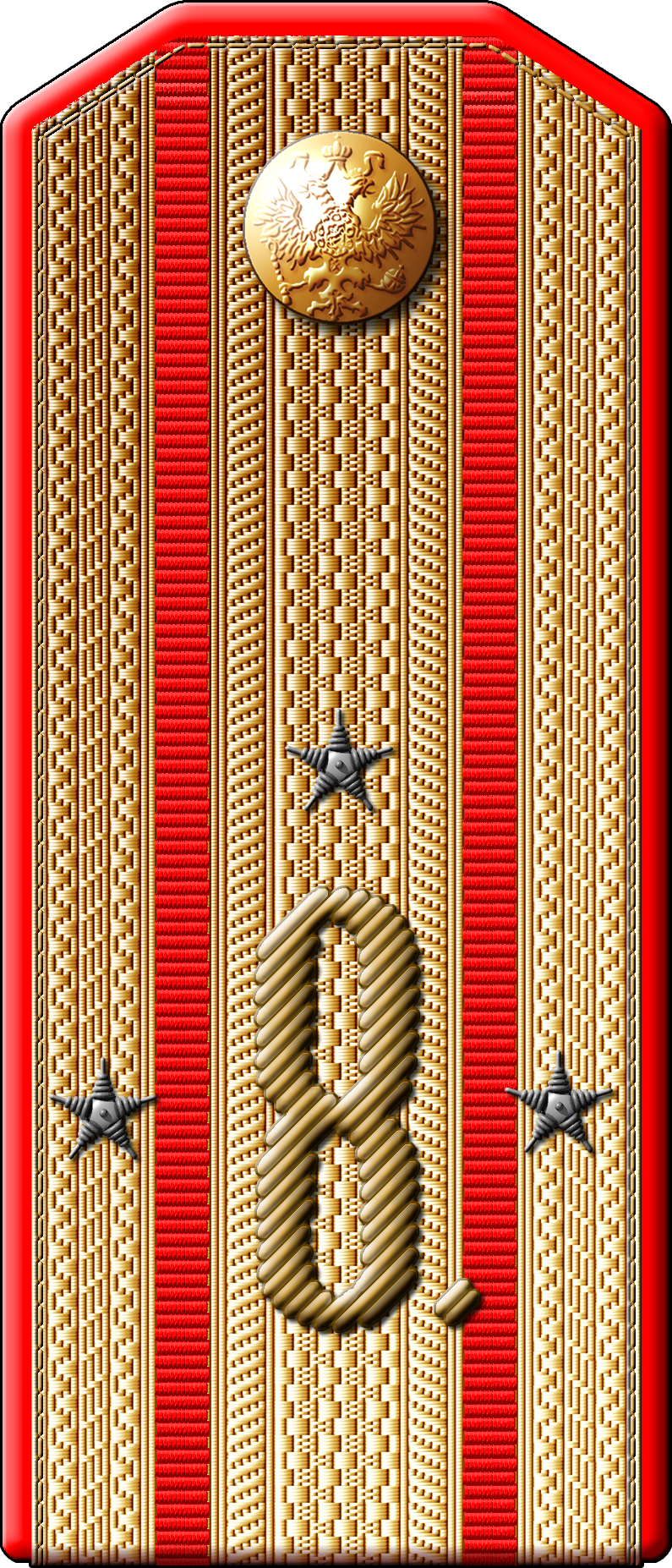
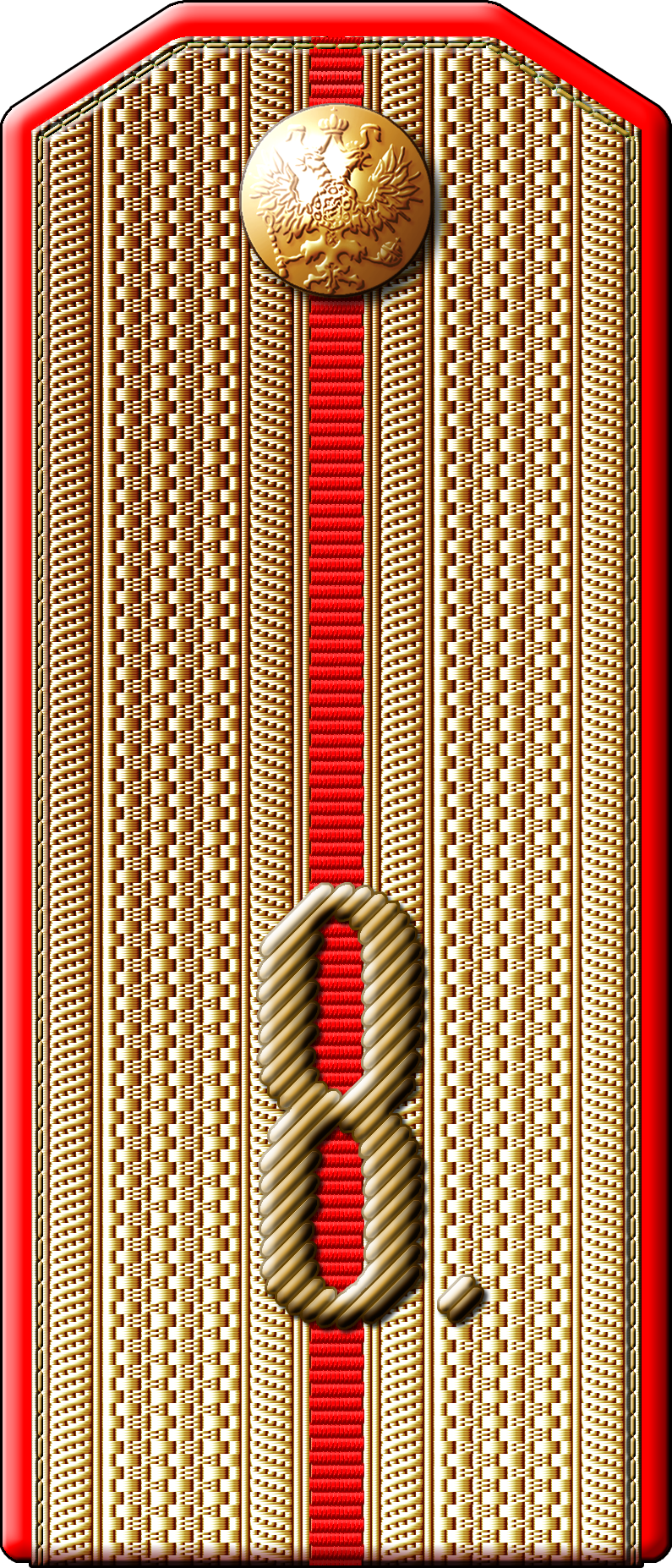
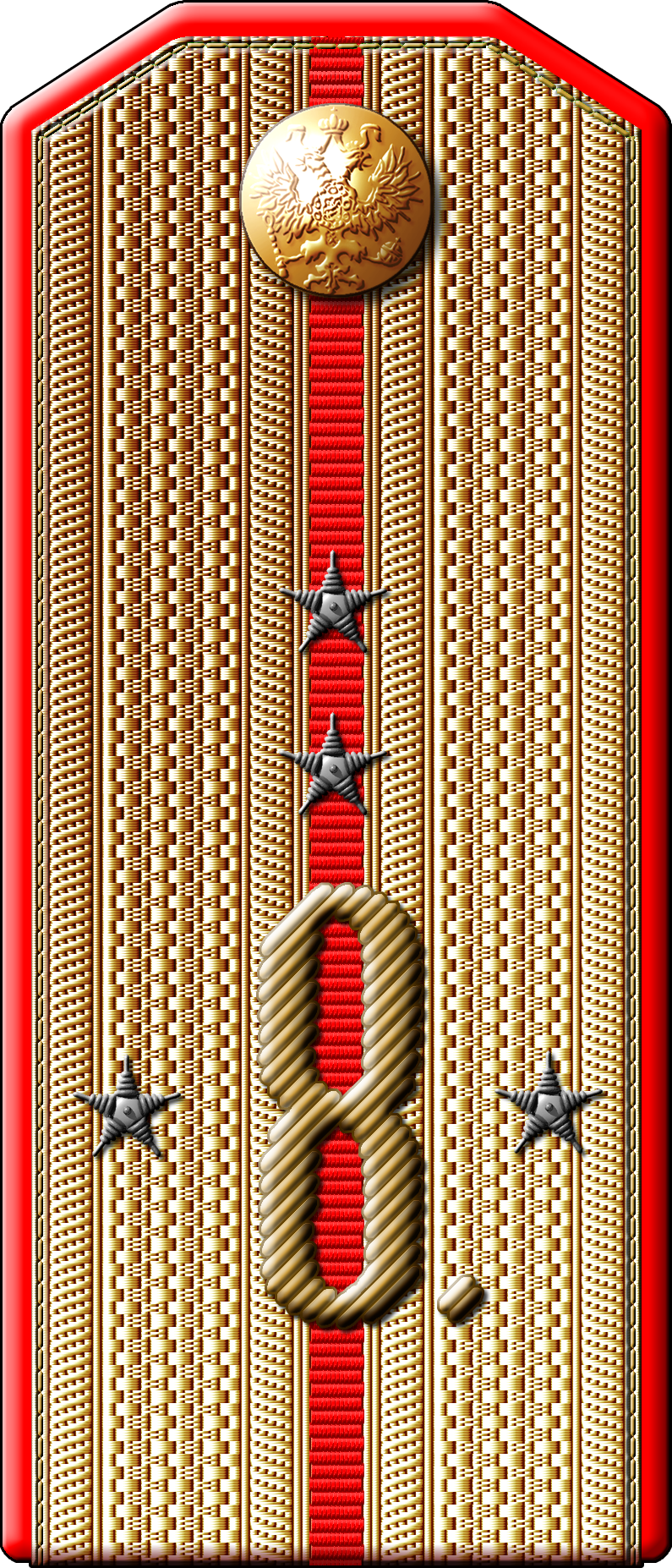
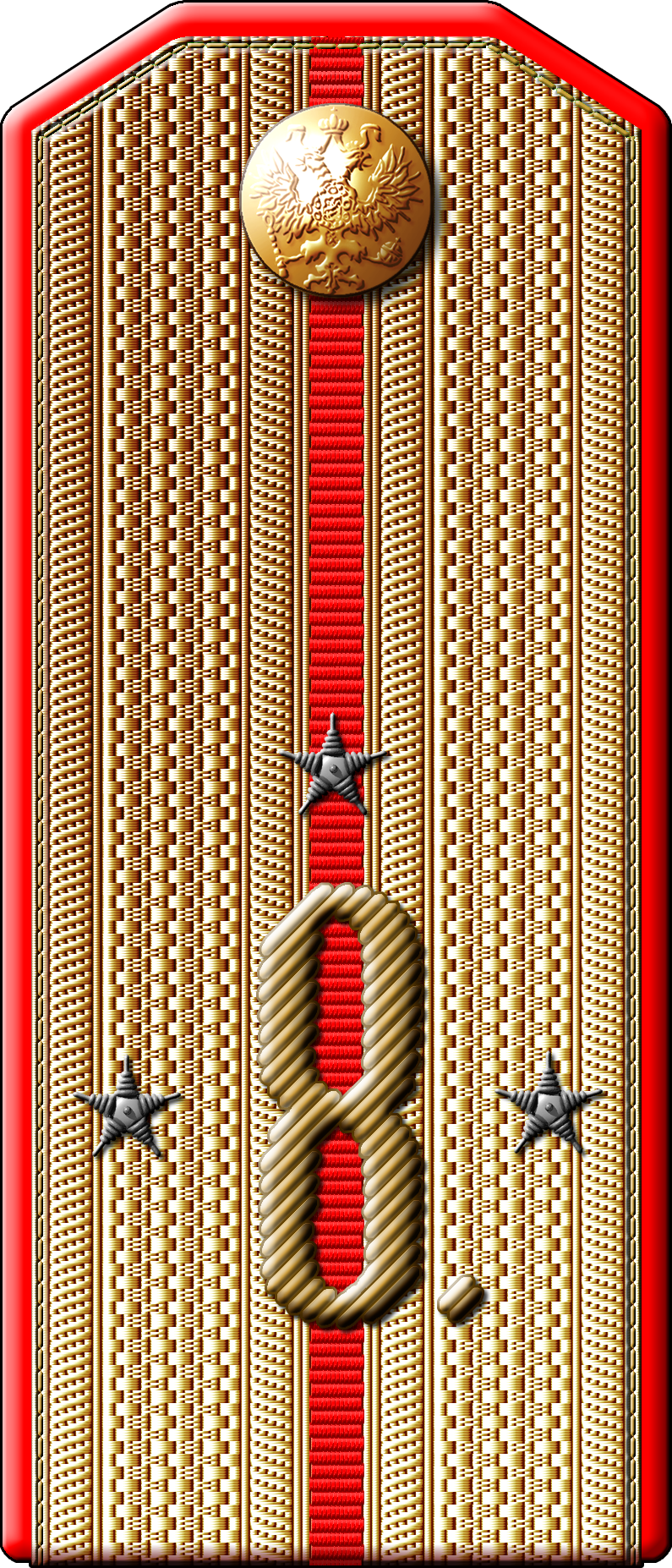
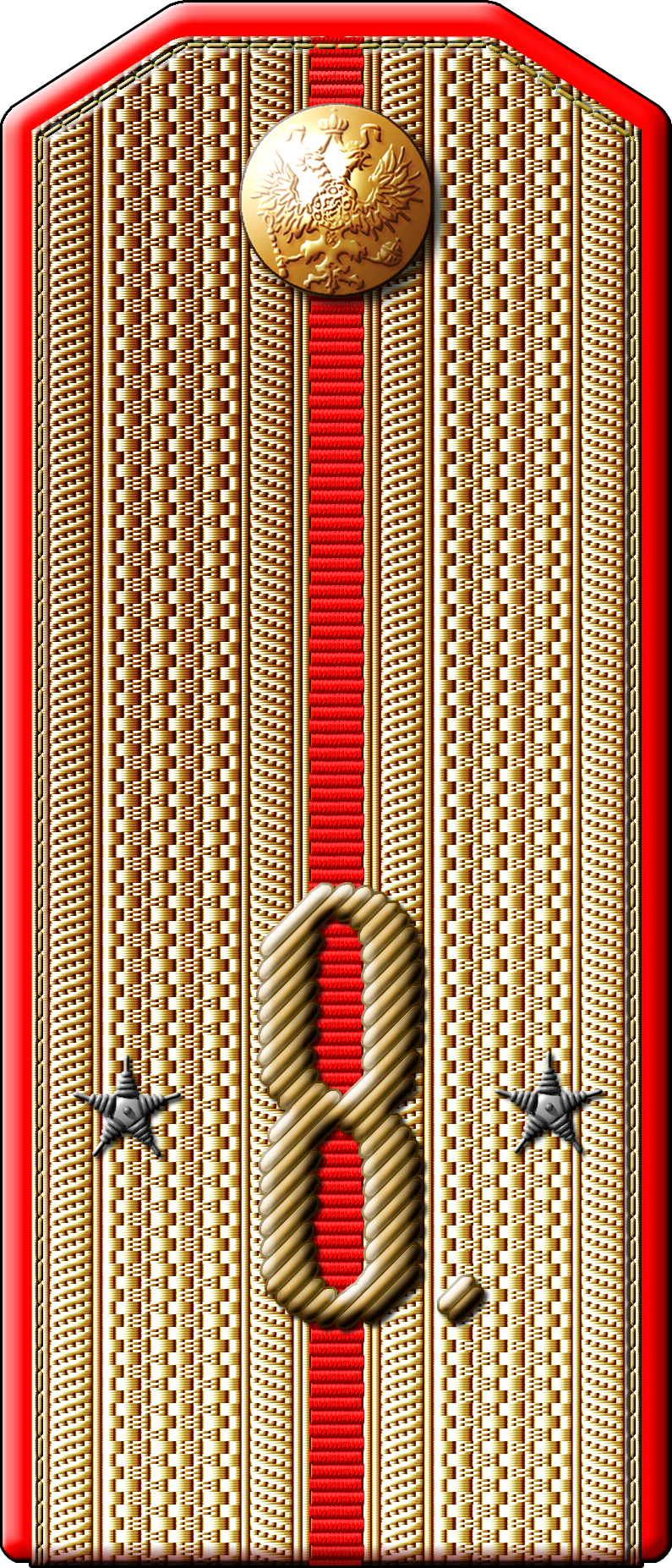
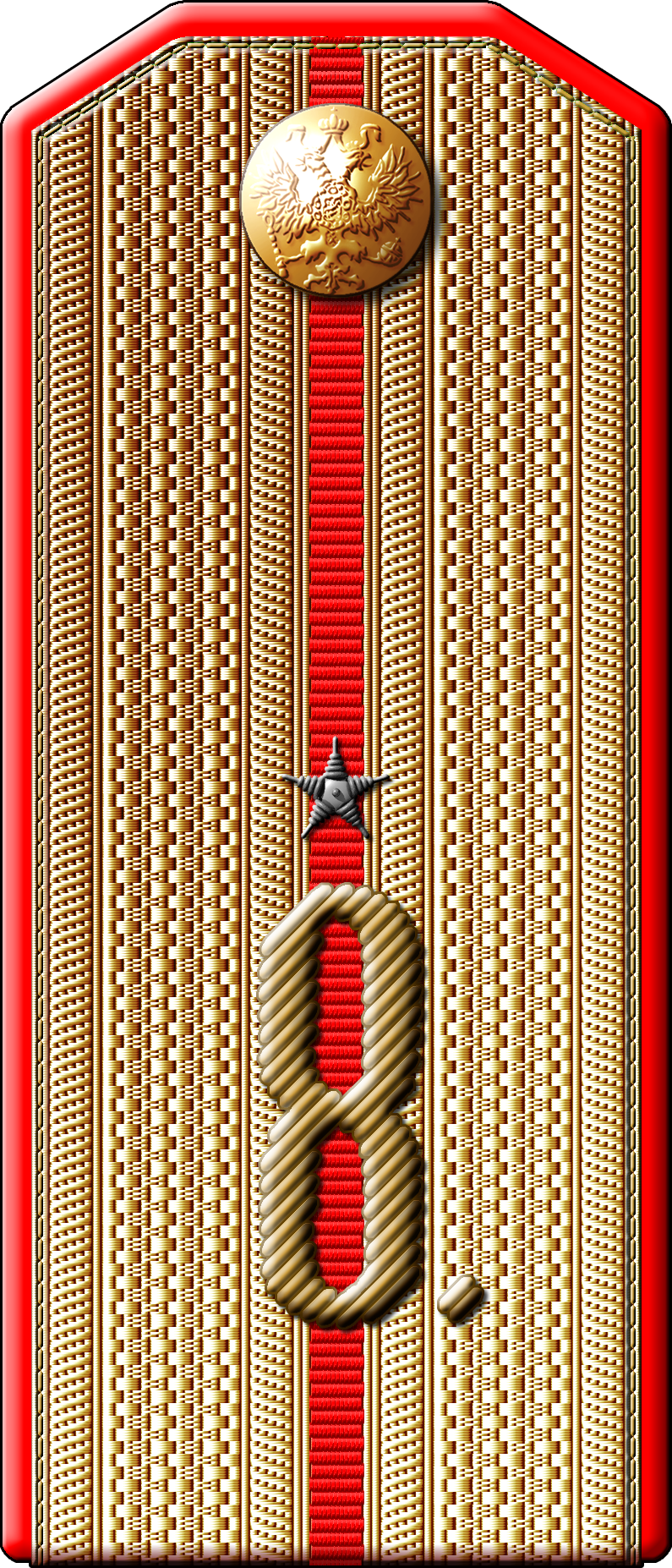
Description	Rank insignia as to the design 1904–1906
Shoulder straps
Rank designation	Polkovnik (en: colonel)	Podpolkovnik (lieutenant colonel)	Kapitan (en: captain)	Stabs-kapitan	Poruchik	Podporuchik	Praporshchik
Rrank group	Shtab-ofitsery (en: staff officers)			Ober-ofitsery (en: upper, superior, or higher officers)

=== Non-commissioned officers and enlisted ranks ===
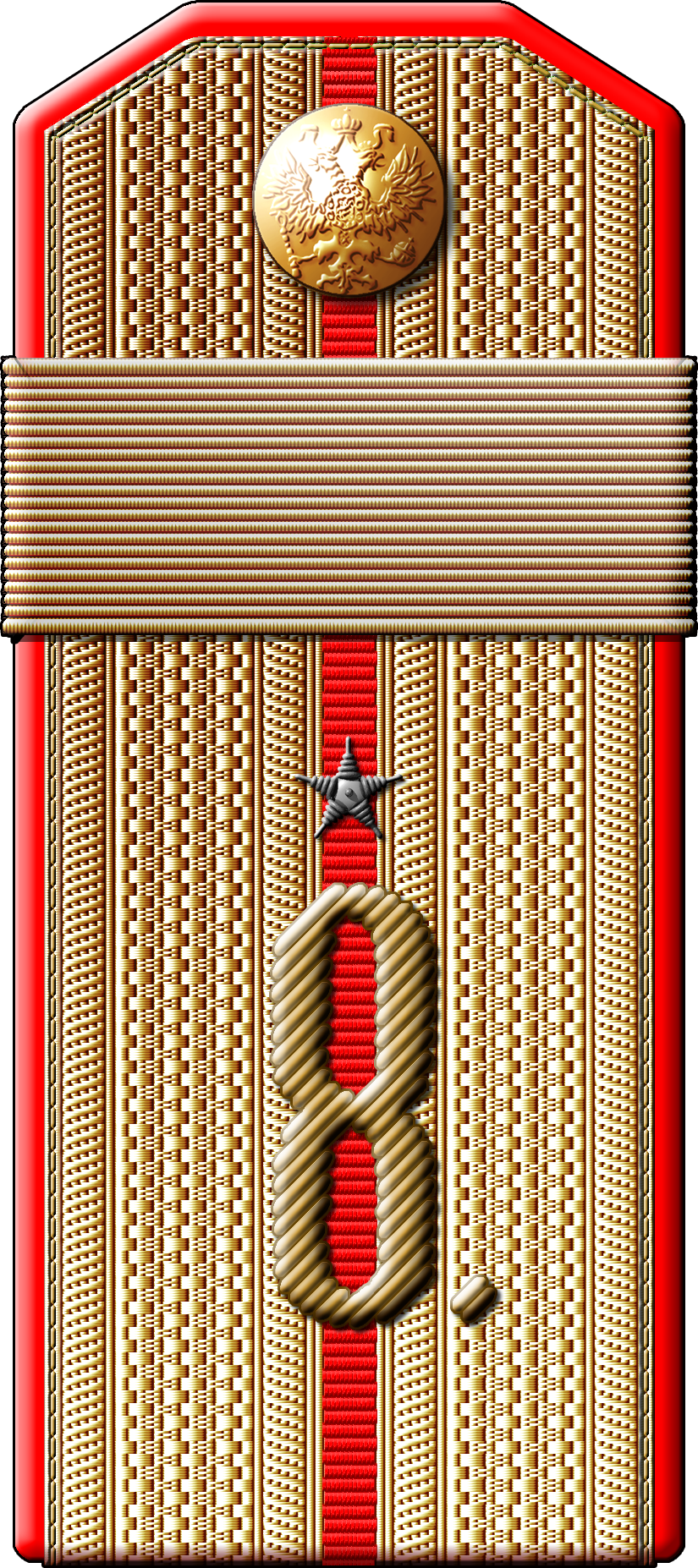
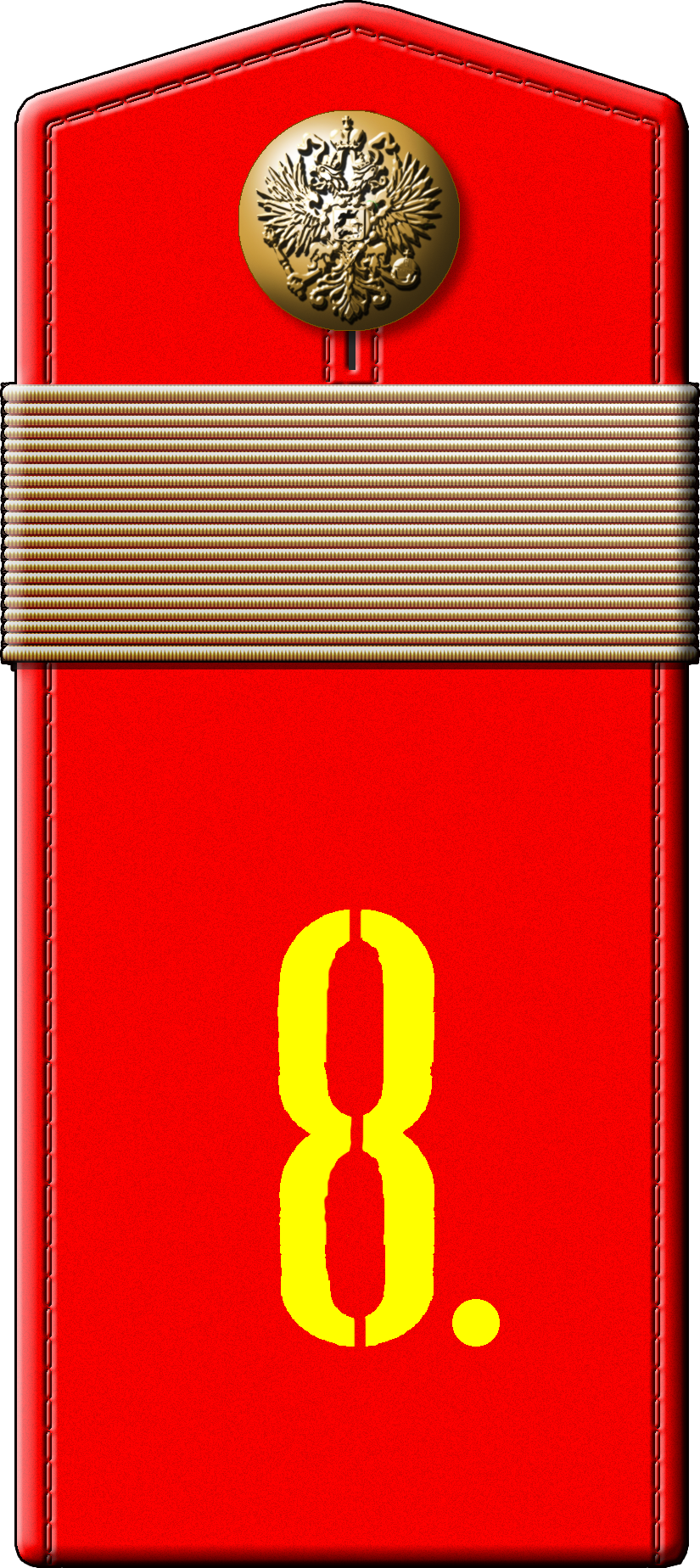
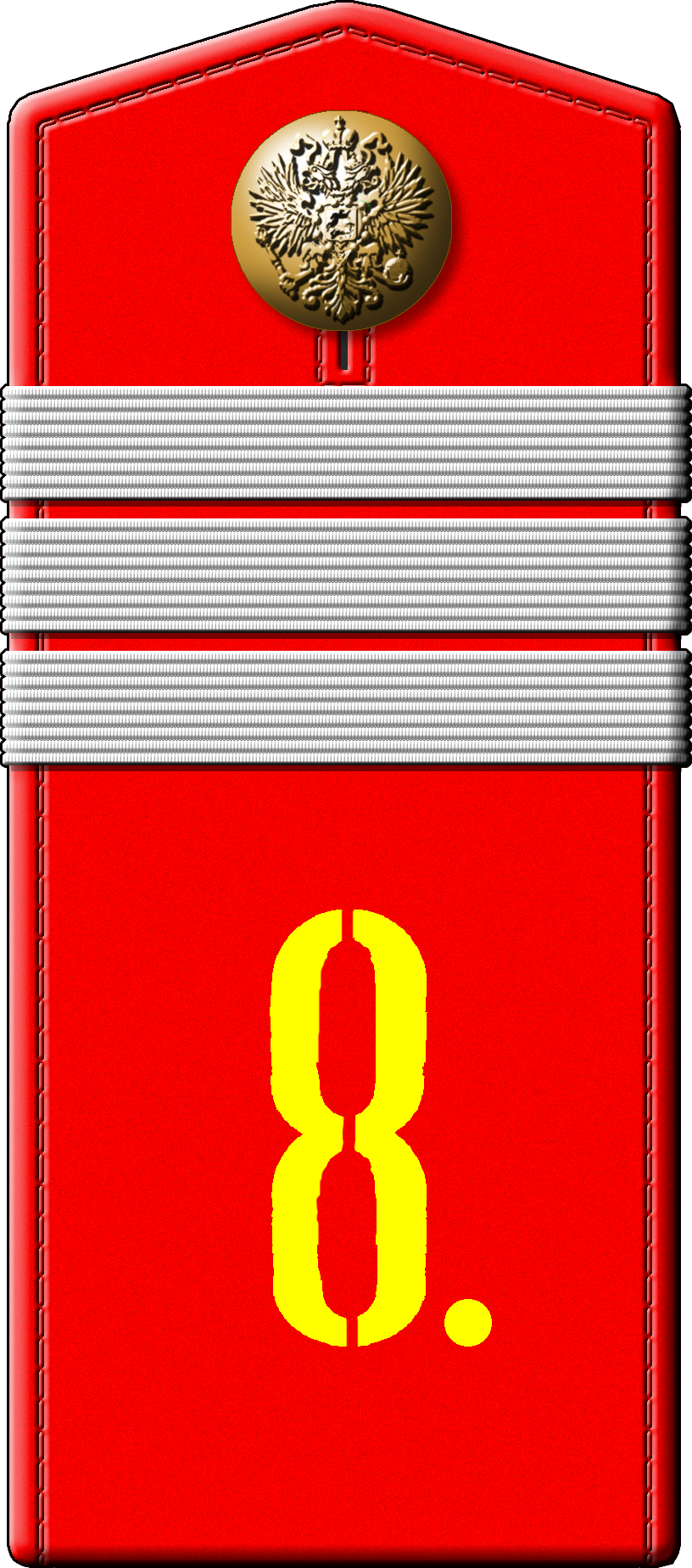
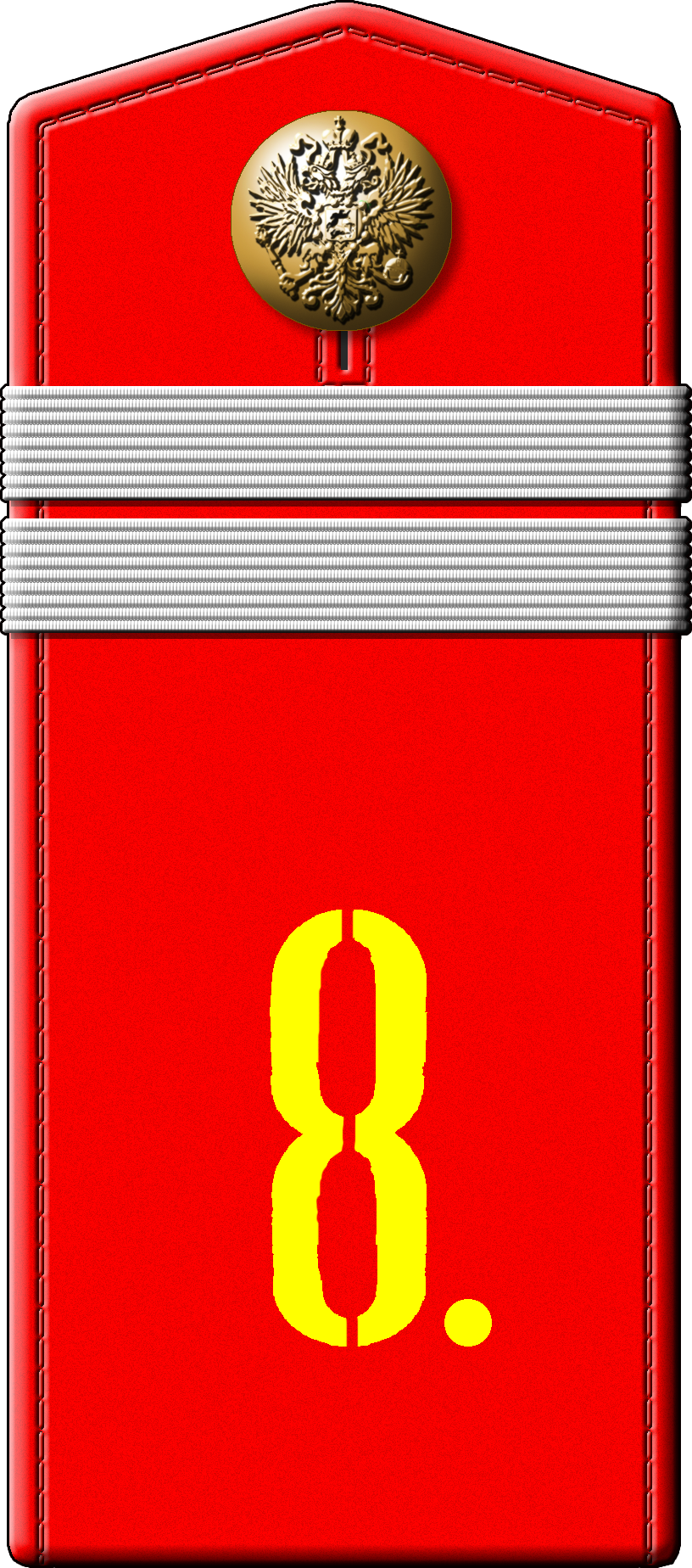
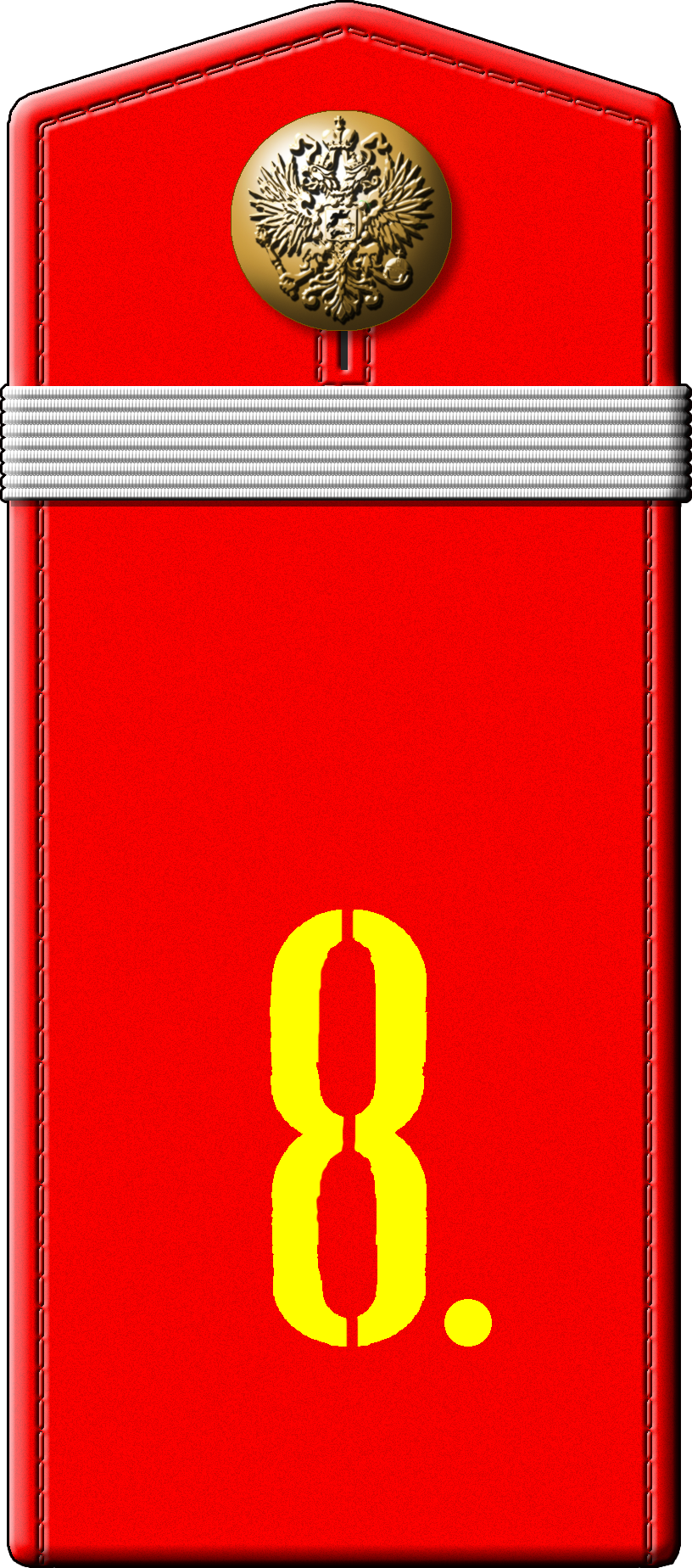
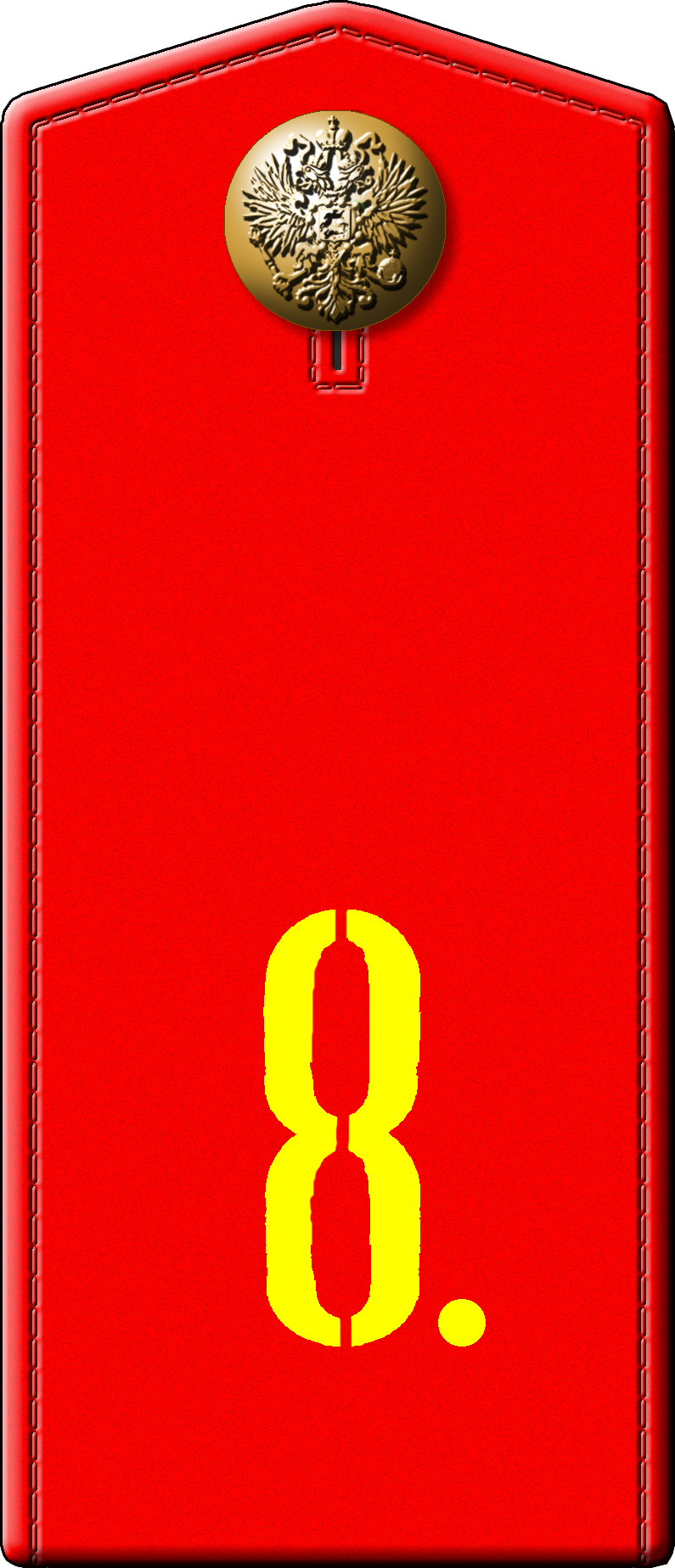
Description	Rank insignia as to the design 1904–1906
Shoulder straps
Rank designation	Zauryad-praporshchik (generated from feldfebel rank)	Feldfebel	Starshy unter-оfitser (en: senior NCO)	Мladshy unter-оfitser (en: junior NCO)	Yefeytor (en: Private first class)	Ryadovoy (en: Private)
Rank group	Unter-ofitsery (en: Non-commissioned officers)				Ryadovye (en: enlisted men)

== Commanders (Division Chiefs) ==
- 1834–1849: Fedor Panyutin
- 1905: Nikolai Grigorievich Mikhailov
- 1906–1907: Eduard Ekk
- 1909: Evgeny Emilievich Fitingof (baron)
- 21 December 1914 – 5 July 1915: Eduard Arkadievich Kolyankovsky
