= 28th Army Corps (Russian Empire) =

- Country: Russian Empire
- Allegiance: Imperial Russian Army

The 28th Army Corps was an Army corps in the Imperial Russian Army.

== Part of ==
- 11th Army: 1914 - 1915
- 8th Army: 1915
- 5th Army: 1915
- 12th Army: 1915
- 5th Army: 1915 - 1917
- 1st Army: 1917

== Commanders ==
- 1914-1915 : Nikolai Kashtalinsky
- 1915-1917 : Vladimir Alekseevich Slesarenko
- 1917- ? : Mikhail Mikhailovich Butchik
