= 6th Infantry Division (Russian Empire) =

- 6-я пехотная дивизия
- Active: 1806 – c. 1918
- Country: Russian Empire
- Branch: (Russian Empire) Russian Imperial Army
- Role: Infantry
- Size: approx. 20,000
- Garrison/HQ: Ostrov
- Engagements: World War I

The 6th Infantry Division (Russian: 6-я пехотная дивизия, 6-ya pekhotnaya diviziya) was an infantry formation of the Russian Imperial Army that existed in various formations from 1806 until the end of World War I and the Russian Revolution. From before 1903 to the end of its existence the division was based in Ostrov.

== History ==
The division fought in World War I and distinguished itself in battle against the Austro-Hungarian 4th Army in 1915. It was demobilized around the time of the Russian Revolution and the subsequent unrest.

== Organization ==
It was part of the 15th Army Corps as of 1914.

- 1st Brigade
  - 21st Murom Infantry Regiment
  - 22nd Nizhny Novgorod Infantry Regiment
- 2nd Brigade
  - 23rd General Field Marshal Count Saltykov's Nizovsky Infantry Regiment
  - 24th General Neverovsky's Simbirsk Infantry Regiment
- 6th Artillery Brigade

== Commanders ==
- 1900–1903: Mikhail Zasulich
