= Eduard Arkadievich Kolyankovsky =

Imperial Russian Army general (1857–1927)

- Эдуард Аркадьевич Колянковский
- Born: 13 October 1857
- Died: 1927
- Military career
- Allegiance: Russian Empire
- Branch: Imperial Russian Army
- Service years: 1874–1917
- Rank: Lieutenant general
- Conflicts: Russo-Turkish War (1877–1878); Russo-Japanese War; World War I; East Prussia

Eduard Arkadievich Kolyankovsky (13 October 1857 – 1927) was an Imperial Russian Army general. He participated in the Russo-Turkish War, the Russo-Japanese War, and World War I. On the eve of World War I, he was one of two Poles to hold the position of division commander.

== Biography ==
Eduard Kolyankovsky was born on 13 October 1857. He was of Polish descent and raised in the Roman Catholic faith. He graduated from the 1st Moscow Cadet Corps and on 3 August 1874, entered service in the Imperial Russian Army. He received his military education at the 3rd Alexander Military School and the Nicholas Engineering School. After graduating from these schools, he was assigned to serve in the 3rd Reserve Sapper Battalion with the rank of second lieutenant, with seniority dating from 22 May 1877.

He took part in the Russo-Turkish War of 1877–1878. He was promoted to Guards second lieutenant, with seniority dating from 15 November 1878, and to lieutenant, with seniority dating from 20 April 1880. He subsequently graduated from the Nicholas Military-Technical Academy in the first category.

He was promoted to staff captain, with seniority dating from 20 September 1882, and to captain, with seniority dating from 30 September 1884. For one year and three months, he served as a company commander. From 31 December 1892 to 20 August 1896, he held the position of works supervisor in Shlisselburg.

On 28 March 1893, he was promoted to lieutenant colonel, with seniority dating from that date. From 28 August 1896 to 3 February 1905, he served as a staff officer for special assignments with the St. Petersburg District Engineering Administration. He was promoted to colonel, with seniority dating from 13 April 1897.

== Russo-Japanese War ==
In 1905, Kolyankovsky was promoted to major general. He participated in the Russo-Japanese War, serving as acting commander of an infantry brigade from June to August 1905. From 3 February 1905 to 25 July 1906, he was assistant to the Inspector of Engineers of the 3rd Manchurian Army. He then commanded the 1st Brigade of the 17th Infantry Division until 6 February 1914.

== World War I ==
On 6 February 1914, he was promoted to the rank of lieutenant general "for distinction," with seniority dating from that date. From the same day, he served as commander of the 30th Infantry Division.

He took part in World War I and, in August–September 1914, participated in the East Prussian Operation. On 29 August 1914, following a battle, contact with the 119th Kolomna Infantry Regiment was lost, and this was not reported to the commander of the 1st Army, General of Cavalry Paul von Rennenkampf, for a week. For this, on 7 September, Rennenkampf removed Kolyankovsky from his post.

By Imperial Order of 3 October 1914, Kolyankovsky was relieved of his position and assigned to the reserve of officers of the Minsk Military District, where he remained until 21 December 1914.

From 21 December 1914 to 5 July 1915, he served as commander of the 8th Infantry Division. He then served as commander of the 3rd Caucasian Rifle Brigade until 19 November 1915. From 19 November 1915 to 1 January 1916, he was in the reserve of officers at the headquarters of the Dvinsk Military District.

From 1 January 1916 to 18 April 1917, he served as commander of the 120th Infantry Division. From 18 April to 29 June 1917, he was again in the reserve of officers at the headquarters of the Dvinsk Military District. On 29 June 1917, he was resigned from the army due to ill health.

== Awards ==
- St. Stanislaus 3rd Class with swords and bow (1877)
- St. Anna, 3rd Class, with swords and bow (1877)
- St. Stanislaus 2nd Class with Swords (1877)
- St. Vladimir, 3rd Class (1901)
- St. Stanislaus 1st Class (1906)
- St. Anne 1st Art. (1910)
- St. Vladimir, 2nd Class with swords (VP 04/29/1915)
- White Eagle with Swords (VP 04.06.1915)
