= Battle of the Yalu River (1904) =

1904 battle in the Russo-Japanese War

- Part of the Russo-Japanese War
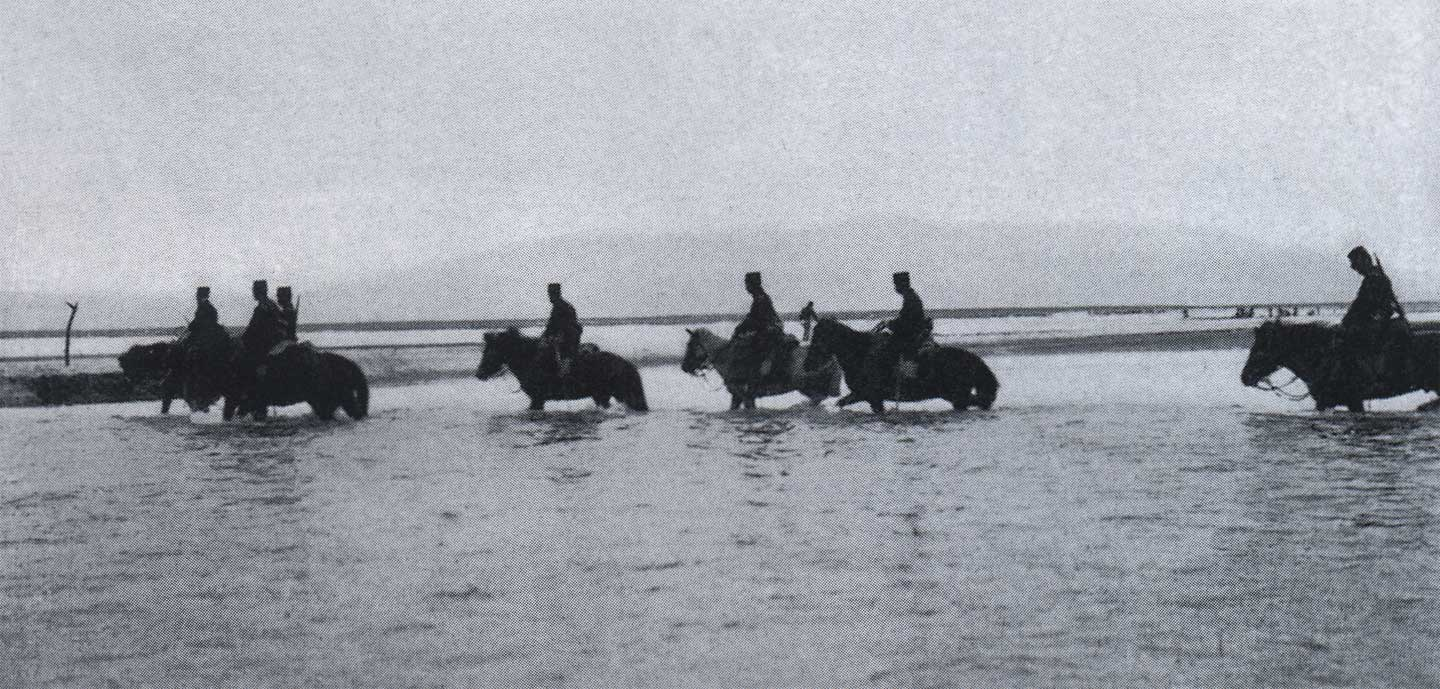
- Japanese cavalry crossing the Yalu River
Date	30 April – 1 May 1904
Location	Near Wiju, border of Korea and China 40°11′29″N 124°31′33″E
Result	Japanese victory

Belligerents
Empire of Japan	Russian Empire

Commanders and leaders
Kuroki Tamemoto	(Russian Empire) Mikhail Zasulich (Russian Empire) Nikolai Kashtalinsky

Strength
42,000	25,000

Casualties and losses
1,036 casualties	2,172 casualties: 593 killed; 1,101 wounded; 478 missing

The Battle of the Yalu River (Amnok River) lasted from April 30 to May 1, 1904 and was the first major land battle during the Russo-Japanese War. It was fought near Wiju (modern village of Sinuiju, North Korea) on the lower reaches of the Yalu River, on the border between Korea and China. Also known as the Yalu River Crossing Operation.

== The Russian situation ==
The Imperial Russian Army commander in the Far East, General Alexei Kuropatkin followed a strategy of stalling while waiting for enough reinforcements to come up to the front via the incomplete single-track Trans-Siberian Railway to take the offensive. He estimated that it would take at least 6 months to build his forces up to suitable levels. The Viceroy of the Russian Far East, Yevgeni Alekseyev, had given General Kuropatkin strict orders not to hinder the Japanese northward progress through Korea, but hold the line of the Yalu River to prevent the Japanese from crossing into Manchuria.

On April 22, 1904 Kuropatkin dispatched the "Eastern Detachment" under the command of Lieutenant-General Mikhail Zasulich with 16,000 infantry, 5,000 cavalry and some 62 artillery pieces to fight a static delaying action on the north bank of the river. However, Zasulich's force was spread out piecemeal over a 170-mile front, whereas the Imperial Japanese Army could concentrate its efforts on any single point of its choosing. General Zasulich did not hold the Japanese in very high regard. Most of the Russian forces were deployed near Wiju, blocking the main road from Korea to Manchuria. Small detachments guarded the bank up and down the river.

== The Japanese situation ==
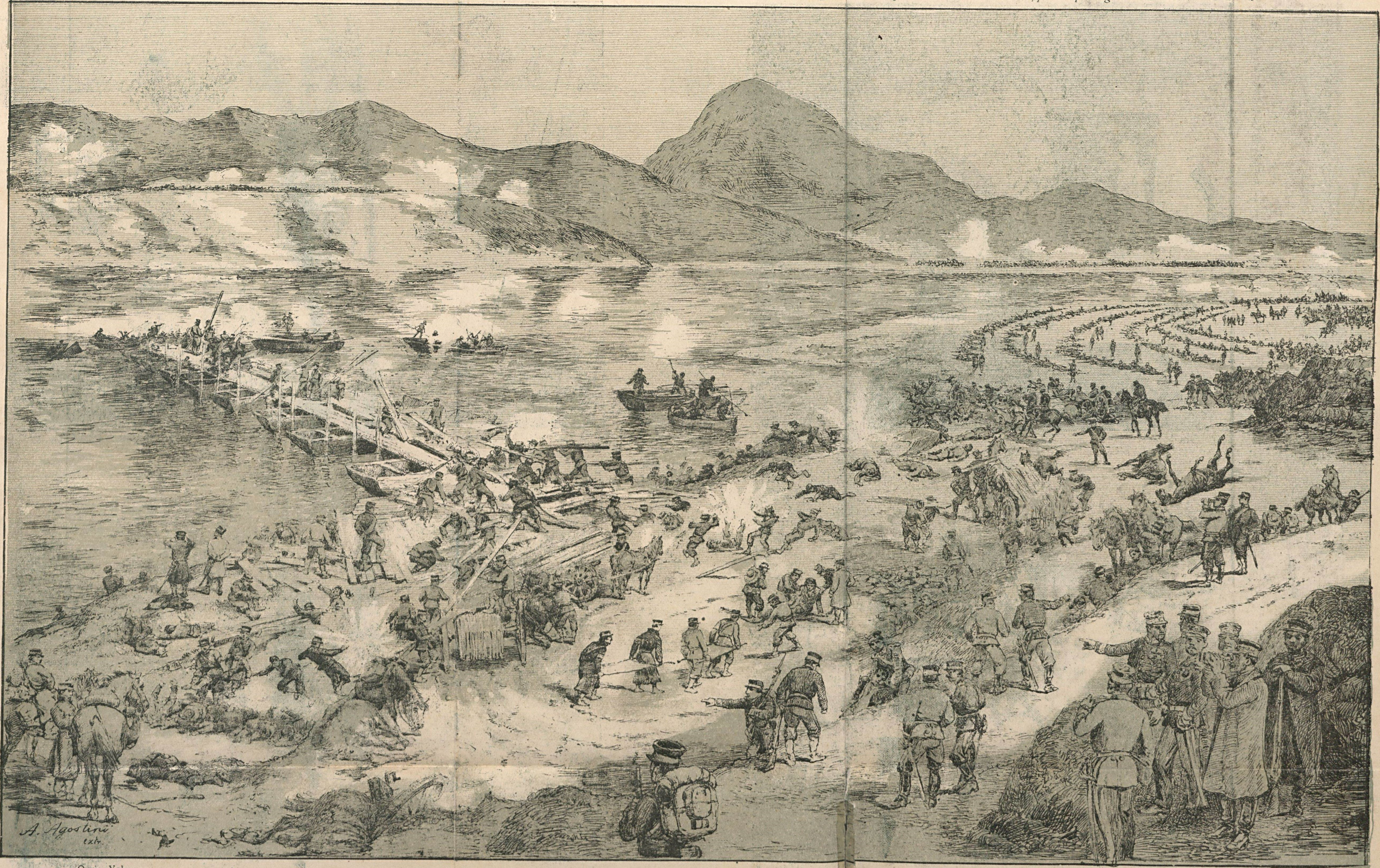
The crossing of the Yalu River by Marshal Baron of Kuroki's troops. The picture also shows the construction of a bridge over barges by the Japanese on the Korean side near the island of Housan for the passage of the 2nd Army Division (Angelo Agostini, O Malho, 1904).

After the success of the Imperial Japanese Navy at the Battle of Chemulp'o Bay on 9 February 1904, the way was clear for the Imperial Japanese Army to deploy the 2nd, the 12th, and the Guards Divisions of the Japanese 1st Army, commanded by Major-General Baron Tamemoto Kuroki, into Korea. The total strength of Japanese force was about 42,500 men. The Japanese 1st Army advanced quickly northwards from Chemulp'o (modern Incheon), with advance units entering Pyongyang on 21 February 1904 and Anju by 18 March 1904. Learning their lessons in logistics and transport from the Sino-Japanese War, the Japanese army hired some 10,000 local laborers at wages well above the local norms, and paid also for any food and supplies procured locally. This contrasted greatly with the behavior of the Russian troops previously in northern Korea.

By seizing the port of Chinampo (modern Nampo, North Korea) at the mouth of the Taedong River outside of Pyongyang with the spring thaw, the Japanese were able to land the remaining components of the 1st Army by 29 March.

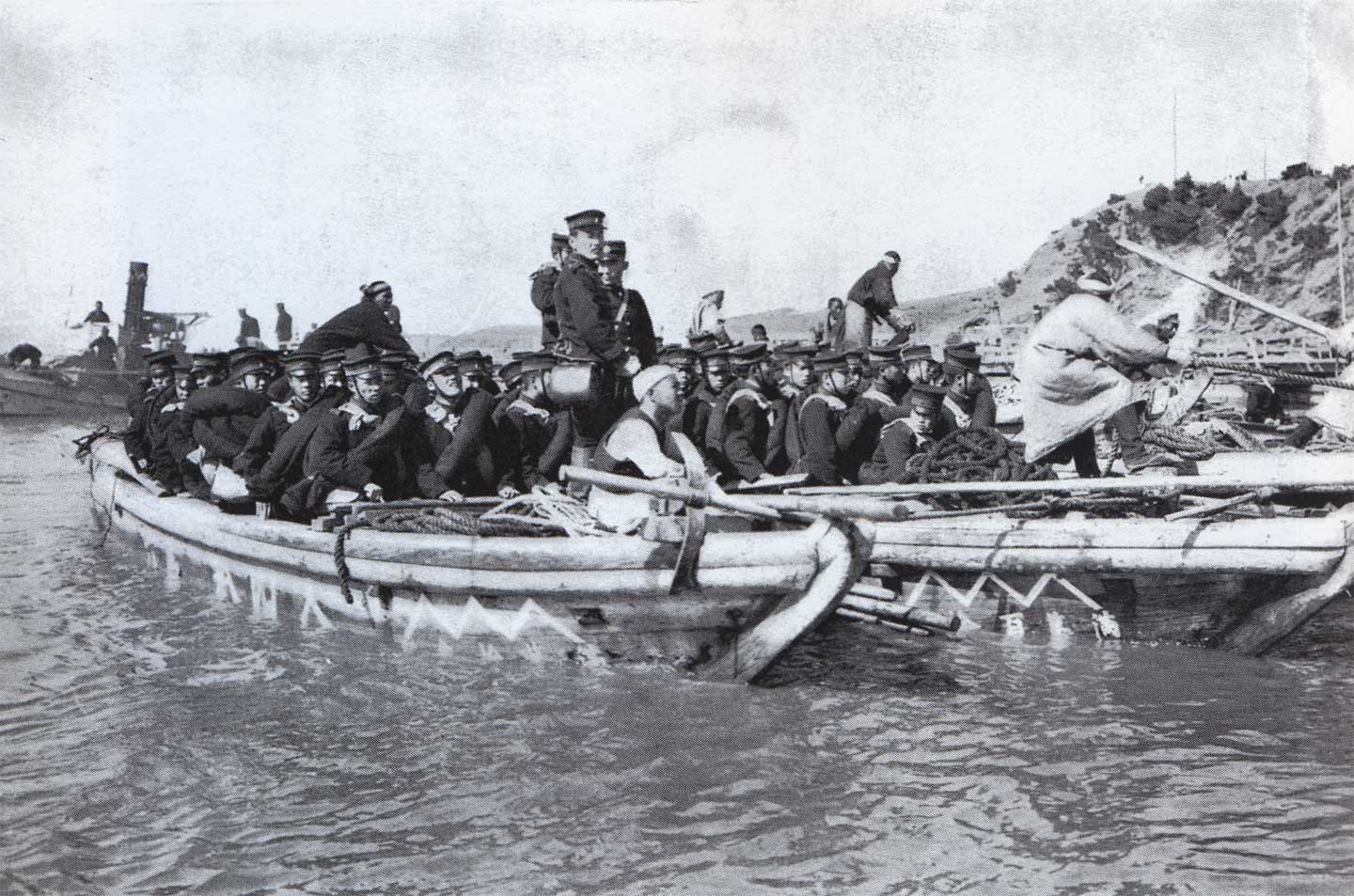
Japanese troops landing on Nampo

By 21 April 1904 the Japanese 1st Army was concentrated and hidden south of Wiju. The Japanese were in the same positions on the southern bank of the Yalu River that they had been in August 1894. The Japanese knew the exact locations of the Russians' deployment from intelligence by forward scouts disguised as Korean fishermen, the Russians made no effort to conceal their positions. By 23 April, the Japanese knew the layout of the Russian trench line and details of the defensive positions around the area of Antung. Intelligence was so effective that the Japanese estimate of the Russian troop strength was only exceeded by 1,000 and their estimate of the guns was only two less than the actual number. The Japanese made every effort to keep their positions hidden. Screens of trees, millet and bushes were used to conceal activity as well as roads, artillery and other equipment.

== Prelude ==
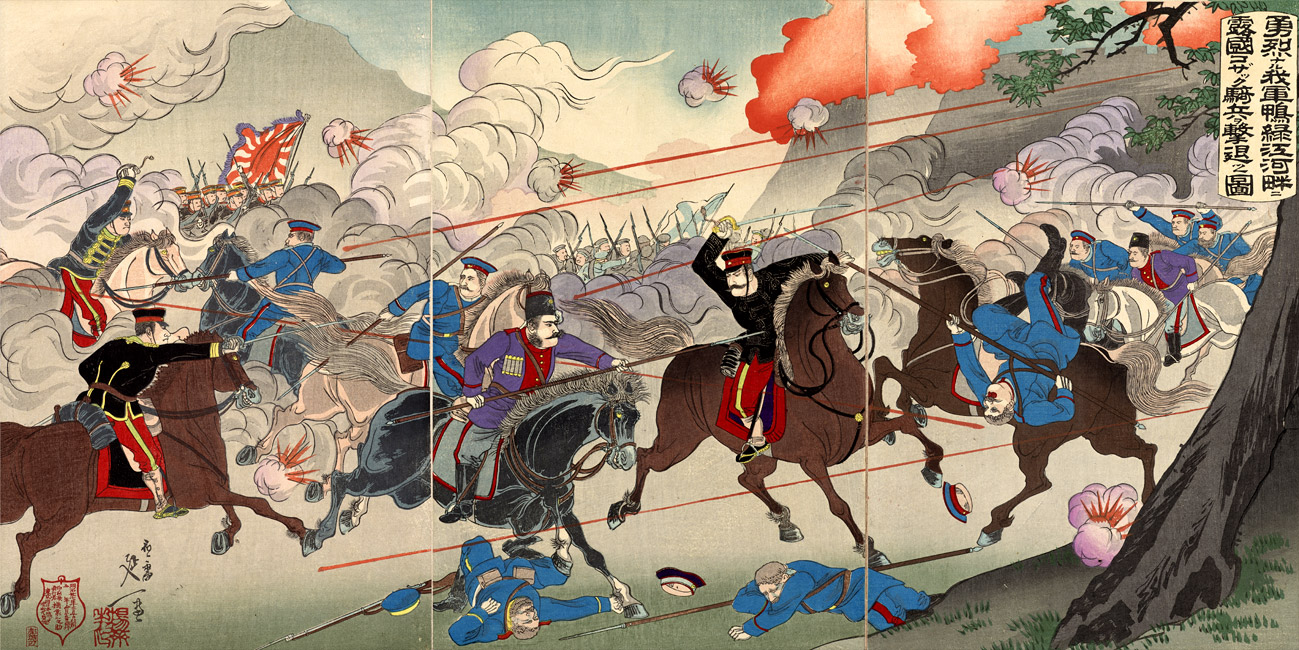
Picture of Our Valorous Military Repulsing the Russian Cossack Cavalry on the Bank of the Yalu River by Watanabe Nobukazu (1874–1944), March 1904

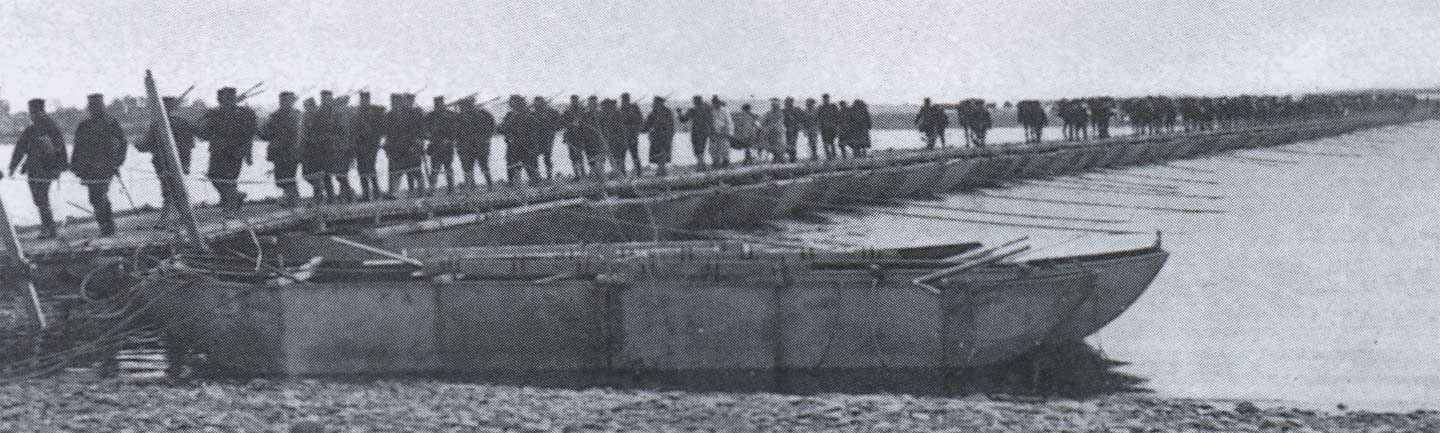
Japanese troops crossing the Yalu River

The prelude to major action took place at 21:45 (9:45 pm) on the night of 25 April 1904, when two battalions of the Japanese 2nd Division seized Kintei, Kyuri, and Oseki Island in the Yalu River without opposition. After reinforcement at 0400 on 26 April by units from the Guards Division and a brief firefight, the forward Russian observation post withdrew to the main Russian lines on the north shore.

Japanese engineers determined that ten bridges 1,630 yards (1490.5m) would be required to span the river. A third of these were steel prefabricated pontoons which weighed 100 pounds each. The remainder were made from local resources. In full view of Russian positions, the Japanese began constructing a causeway across the Yalu River to Kintei Island with the intention of distracting and exposing enemy artillery fire. The ruse worked as the bridge was immediately targeted by two Russian batteries. With the Russians so engaged, the Japanese prepared ten other bridges that could quickly be moved into position for a rapid assault across the river at other locations.

While the midstream islands were being secured, General Kuroki ordered a feint on the lower Yalu River when Japanese gunboats engaged Cossack detachments at the river mouth. This convinced General Zasulich that the main Japanese attack would fall on the vicinity of the town of Andong, and he concentrated his forces there.

The Russians observed these movements with trepidation, and General Kashtalinsky informed General Zasulich that the Japanese were about to assault the position in force and his position was in danger of being flanked. Zasulich chose to ignore the reports, thinking that the attack was only a feint, and redeployed a single battalion with four guns. Zasulitch remained convinced that the main Japanese attack would fall at Andong, and kept his main force as well as his reserves at that location.

== The main battle ==
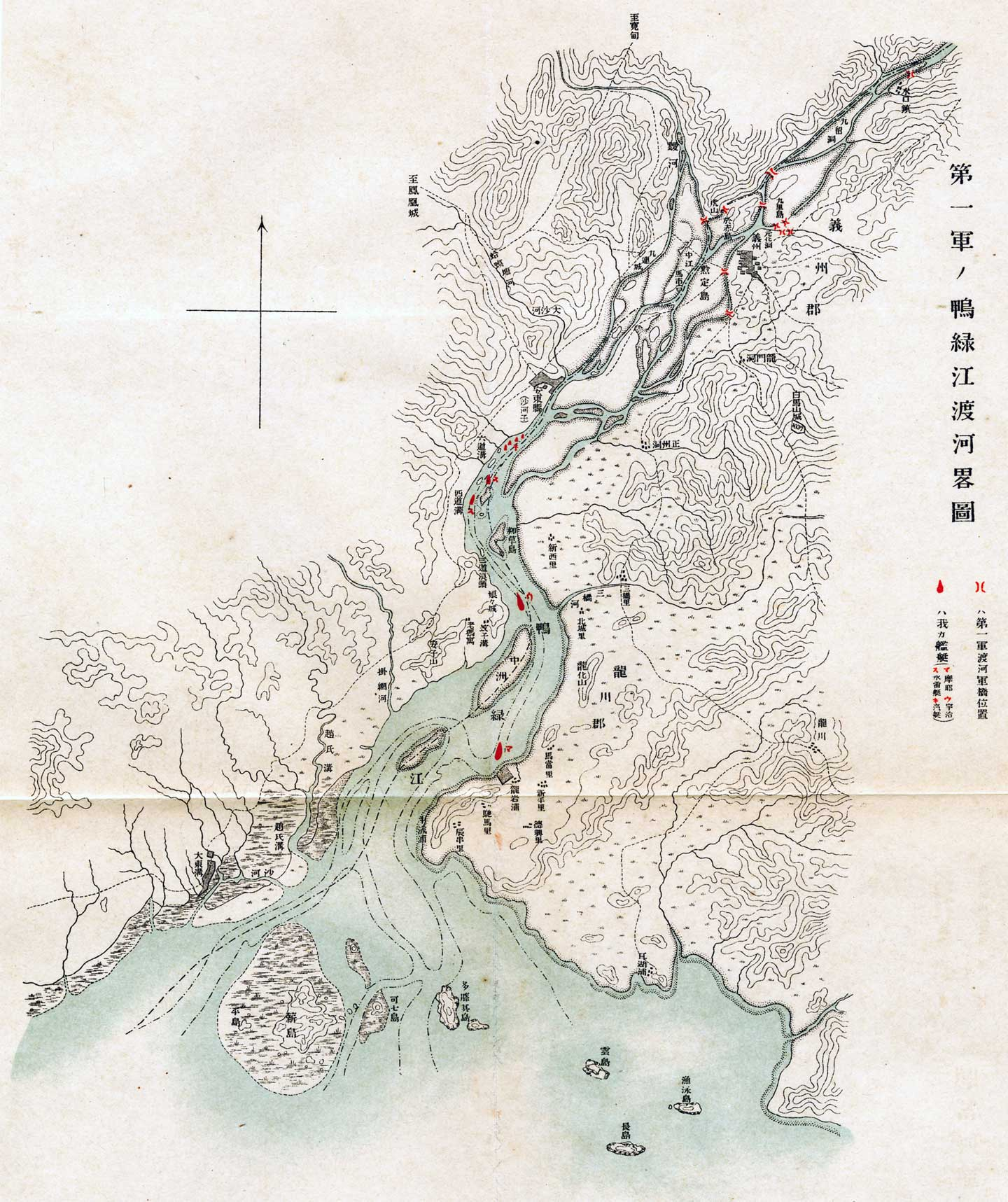
Map of the crossing over the Yalu River by the Japanese 1st. Army.

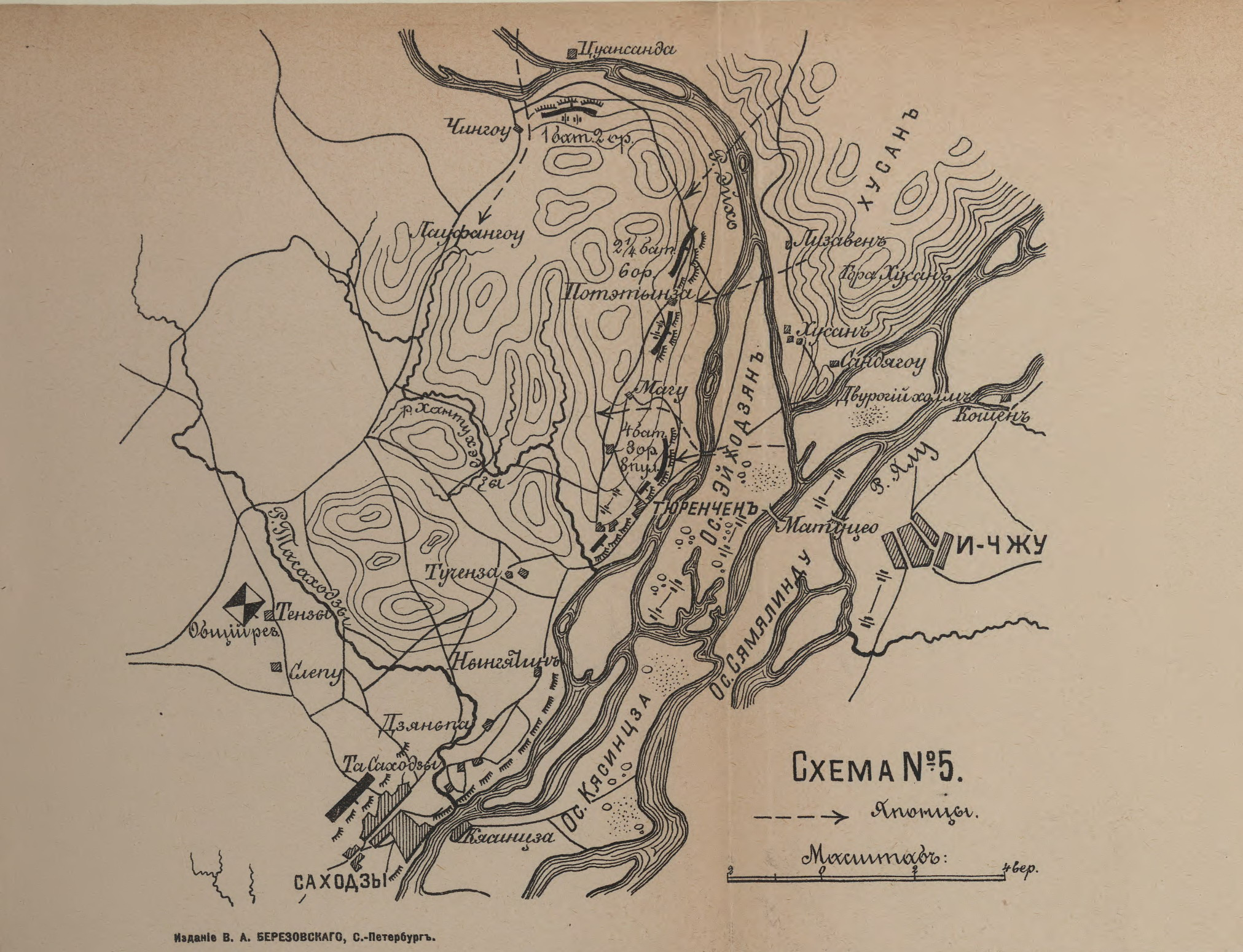
Russian map depicting positions of the Eastern detachment and Japanese advance.

The Japanese main attack began in the early morning hours of 27 April 1904. By daybreak, the Guards Division was moving into position in the center. They launched a lightning assault against unprepared Russian troops at strategic Tiger Hill, which overlooked the confluence of the Ai and Yalu rivers. Two days later, Russian troops launched an attack on the Guards Division at Tiger Hill in an attempt to retake the position, but gruesomely failed. Following this, the elements of the Japanese Guards and 2nd Division were able to establish a number of German 4.7 inch howitzers from Krupp on Kintei Island, which they concealed with natural foliage. By April 30, the balance of the 12th Division had crossed the river at the town of Sukujin and was advancing in three columns. Japanese First Army continued its three-pronged advance and was across the Yalu by midnight with very little opposition. Limited visibility masked the Japanese movements from Russian observation. When the fog finally lifted about 0500, the Japanese artillery opened up on the Russian formations.

The 2nd Division took its position on the center, advancing on the newly erected causeways leading from the town of Wiju and thus catching the Russians in a pincer movement at the hamlet of Juliencheng, on the Manchurian-side of the Yalu River opposite Wiju. By 1000, the Russians were in full retreat, with a Japanese attempt to block their escape towards Fenghuangcheng to the north.

At this time, the Japanese once again used their battery on Kintei Island with devastating effect on the exposed Russians. In light of these developments, General Zasulitch was strongly encouraged by his staff to pull back to a more defensible position. However, the general stubbornly refused to concede, even sending a telegram to Tsar Nicholas II in Saint Petersburg informing that victory was soon certain. He chose to ignore General Kuropatkin's phased withdrawal orders (as confirmed by Kuropatkin's chief of staff, General V.V. Sakarov).

General Kuroki had planned to continue the advance of the 12th Division to envelop the Russian left. However, now that the enemy artillery had been neutralized, he decided to engage the Guards and the 2nd Division in a simultaneous assault. It was at this point the Japanese encountered the first serious resistance from the Russian lines. The advance of the 2nd Division was disrupted for a time, and had any of the Russian artillery survived, the outcome might have been different. The Russians were driven from their trenches with severe losses, and the survivors fell back to the tops of the hills, the position that Zasulitch's advisors had unsuccessfully encouraged him to fall back to earlier. During the retreat, a counterattack was made by elements of the Russian 12th East Siberian Rifle Regiment, which was cut to pieces and opened further the breaks in the Russian lines.

The Russian position now became wholly untenable, and remaining formations now were in danger of being encircled. General Zasulich was ordered to retreat. The 11th East Siberian Rifle Regiment, which was covering a retreat, was cut off by the Japanese and suffered large casualties during its breakthrough back to the other Russian forces. At the appearance of the Japanese 12th Division, the Russian left flank panicked and collapsed.

At 17:30 on 1 May 1904, remnants of the Russian Eastern Detachment either surrendered or escaped towards Fenghuangcheng to the north and the Battle for the Yalu River came to an end.

== Outcome ==
The Battle of the Yalu River ended in victory for Japan. The combat had cost the Japanese 1,036 dead and wounded out of the total 1st Army strength of 42,500. The Russian Eastern Detachment suffered some 2,700 casualties overall, including about 500 killed, 1,000 wounded, 600 prisoners and the loss of 21 of 24 field guns.

== Significance ==
The Battle of the Yalu River was the first major land campaign of the Russo-Japanese War. With nothing preventing the Japanese from entering the poorly defended expanses of Manchuria, Kuroki and other generals involved in the campaign were ordered to launch a large offensive with a goal of crushing the massing Russian reinforcements at Liaoyang. Furthermore, the defeat of the Russian Eastern Detachment removed the perception that the Japanese would be an easy enemy, that the war would be short, and that Russia would be the overwhelming victor.
