= 30th Infantry Division (Russian Empire) =

- 30-я пехотная дивизия
- Active: 1914–1918
- Country: Russian Empire
- Branch: Russian Imperial Army
- Role: Infantry

The 30th Infantry Division (Russian: 30-я пехо́тная диви́зия, 30-ya Pekhotnaya Diviziya) was an infantry formation of the Russian Imperial Army.

== Organization ==
- 1st Brigade
  - Yaroslavl 117th Infantry Regiment
  - Shuisky 118th Infantry Regiment
- 2nd Brigade
  - Kolomensky 119th Infantry Regiment
  - Serpukhov 120th Infantry Regiment
- 30th Artillery Brigade

== Commanders ==
- 08/15/1863 - 01/06/1865 - Major General (from 08/30/1863 Lieutenant General) Svoev, Vladimir Nikitich
- 01/06/1865 - 07/28/1877 - Major General (from 05/20/1868 Lieutenant General) Puzanov, Nikolai Nikolaevich
- 07/28/1877 - 01/29/1881 - Major General (from 04/17/1879 Lieutenant General) Shnitnikov, Nikolai Fedorovich
- 02/06/1881 - 09/29/1888 - Major General (from 08/30/1881 Lieutenant General) Ofrosimov, Evfimiy Yakovlevich
- 09/29/1888 - 06/25/1892 - Lieutenant General Zhirzhinsky, Eduard Vikentievich
- 07.20.1892 - 03.31.1893 - Lieutenant General Zeseman, Abunard-Wilhelm-Eduard Emmanuilovich
- 04/11/1893 - 04/18/1895 - Major General (from 11/14/1894 Lieutenant General) Saranchov, Ivan Semyonovich
- 04.24.1895 - 01.10.1899 - Lieutenant General Maslov, Ignatiy Petrovich
- 20.10.1899 - 10.08.1904 - Major General (from 06.12.1899 Lieutenant General) Lavrov, Nikolai Nilovich
- 09/08/1904 - 04.24.1908 - Major General (from 06.12.1904 Lieutenant General) Shevtsov, Alexander Prokhorovich
- 05/15/1908 - 11/28/1908 - Lieutenant General Sennitsky, Vikenty Vikentievich
- 11/28/1908 - 02/06/1914 - Lieutenant General Ivanov, Mikhail Nikitich
- 02/06/1914 - 10/03/1914 - Lieutenant General Eduard Arkadievich Kolyankovsky
- 11/04/1914 - 07/23/1917 - Lieutenant General Karepov, Nikolai Nikolaevich
- 07/23/1917 - Major General Pozharsky, Joseph Fomich

== Commanders of the 2nd Brigade ==
- 1874-1877: Alexander Bozheryanov
- 10/31/1877 - 12/29/1877 - Major General Kappel, Fyodor Fedorovich
- 12/29/1877 - after 07/01/1878 - Major General Pisanko, Alexey Ivanovich
- 11/08/1878 - 07/13/1879 - Major General Buddha, Victor Emmanuilovich
- earlier 09/01/1879 - 01/18/1883 - Major General Tsitlidzev, Georgy Pavlovich
- 04/03/1883 - 08/02/1884 - Major General Duve, Nikolai Ottovich
- 08.24.1884 - 04.16.1889 - Major General Golubev, Fyodor Fedorovich
- 04.16.1889 - 08.28.1889 - Major General Nazansky, Ivan Nikolaevich
- 09/17/1889 - 12/11/1892 - Major General Korsakov, Dmitry Nikolaevich
- 11.12.1892 - 09.10.1899 - Major General Schuld, Karl Konradovich
- 10/31/1899 - 03/06/1900 - Major General Reiman, Ivan Ivanovich
- 03/16/1900 - 11/15/1903 - Major General Shchagin, Vasily Vasilievich
- 11.12.1903 - 28.06.1905 - Major General Vsevolozhsky, Andrey Dmitrievich
- 12.12.1905 - 17.10.1910 - Major General Korotkevich, Nikolai Nikolaevich
- 11/04/1910 - 07/08/1913 - Major General Skopinsky-Shtrik, Alexander Alexandrovich
- 07/08/1913 - 10/13/1914 - Major General Sokolov, Sergei Petrovich
- 10/13/1914 - 03/04/1917 - Major General Erogin, Mikhail Grigorievich
- 03/04/1917 - Colonel (from 04/22/1917 Major General) Władysław Jędrzejewski
