= 15th Army Corps (Russian Empire) =

- Country: Russian Empire
- Allegiance: Imperial Russian Army
- Engagements: World War I; Battle of Tannenberg

The 15th Army Corps was an Army corps in the Imperial Russian Army.

== Composition ==
- 6th Infantry Division
- 8th Infantry Division
- 6th Cavalry Division
- 15th Cavalry Division

== Part of ==
- 2nd Army: 1914
- 10th Army: 1915
- 12th Army: 1915
- 3rd Army: 1915
- 4th Army: 1915–1916
- 2nd Army: 1916
- 1st Army: 1916–1917
- 3rd Army: 1917

== Commanders ==
- 03.11.1893 — 14.11.1894 — Nikolai Stoletov
- 28.12.1911 — 31.10.1914 — Nikolai Martos
- 31.10.1914 — 16.01.1917 — Fjodor von Torklus
- 16.01.1917 — 12.09.1917 — Ilia Odishelidze
