= Mikhail Zasulich =

Imperial Russian army general (1843–1910)

Mikhail Ivanovich Zasulich
- Михаи́л Ива́нович Засу́лич
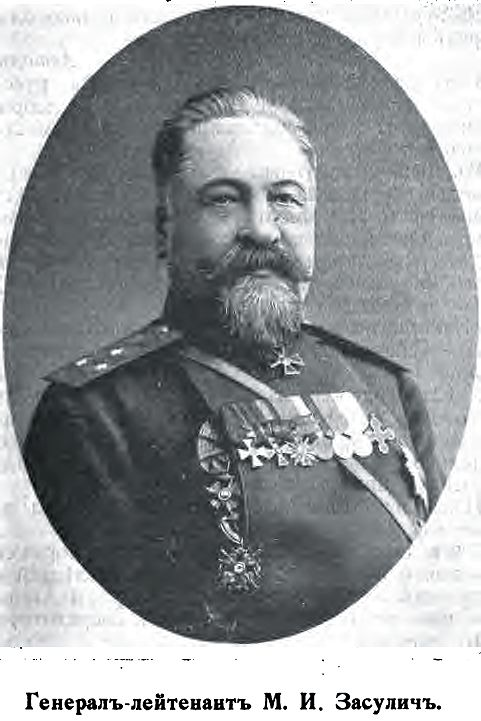
- General Mikhail Ivanovich Zasulich
- Born: 24 December 1843
- Died: 1910
- Military career
- Allegiance: Russian Empire
- Branch: Russian Imperial Army
- Service years: 1863–1906
- Rank: General
- Commands: 1st Brigade, 9th Infantry Division; 6th Infantry Division; 2nd Siberian Army Corps
- Conflicts: Russo-Turkish War; Russo-Japanese War

Mikhail Ivanovich Zasulich (Russian: Михаи́л Ива́нович Засу́лич) (December 24, 1843 – 1910) was a general in the Imperial Russian Army, noted for his role as commander of the Russian 2nd Siberian Army Corps in the Battle of the Yalu River, of the Russo-Japanese War of 1904–1905.

== Biography ==
Zasulich was a graduate of the Cadet Corps and the Konstantinovskoe Military Academy and was commissioned as a lieutenant in 1863, serving with the 93rd Infantry Regiment in Irkutsk. He transferred to the Grenadier Regiment of the Life Guards in 1864. He was with this regiment during the Russo-Turkish War (1877-1878), during which he was highly decorated several times for bravery in combat in the Balkans, especially during the Battle of Philippopolis (1878). He was also promoted to colonel in 1878.

In 1887, Zasulich was assigned command of the 101st Infantry Regiment based at Perm. He was promoted to Major General in 1894 and made commander of the 1st Brigade of the 9th Infantry Division, followed by the 1st Brigade of the 2nd Grenadier Division. In 1899, he took command of Osowiec Fortress in what is now Poland. The following year, he became commander of the 6th Infantry Division, and was promoted to Lieutenant General in 1901.

Immediately before the start of the Russo-Japanese War, Zasulich was given command of the 2nd Siberian Army Corps, with 16,000 infantry, 5,000 cavalry, and 62 artillery pieces, which formed the eastern wing of the Russian Manchurian Army. Assigned to prevent the Imperial Japanese Army from crossing the Yalu River into Manchuria, he made the tactical error of spreading his forces piecemeal over a 170-mile front and heavily fortifying the border of town of Antung, where he was convinced the main attack would come. Assuming that the Japanese army amassing near Wiju upstream from Antung was a feint, he refused requests to redeploy his forces. In the subsequent Battle of Yalu River, the Russian forces were routed by Japanese First Army under General Kuroki Tamemoto. Zasulich, who had a very low opinion of the Japanese, initially refused General Kuropatkin's orders to make a phased withdrawal, but as the Japanese army began to completely overwhelm his forces, he had no choice but to make a costly retreat to the north. Zasulich was replaced as field commander by Lieutenant General Fyodor Eduardovich Keller, but retained command of the Second Siberian Army Corps.

Zasulich subsequently participated in other battles of the war, including the Battle of Tashihchiao, Battle of Hsimucheng, and Battle of Liaoyang as well as the Battle of Mukden; however, as his actions were marked by indecisiveness and passivity, causing his forces to suffer one defeat after another. His refusal to go on the offensive and continual retreats made him unpopular with his troops, at the Battle of Liaoyang, his refusal to obey Lieutenant General Nikolai Zarubaev’s orders to hold his position endangered the entire Russian position.

Citing illness, Zasulich left military service after the end of the war in 1906.

== Honors ==
- Order of St. George, 4th class, 1878
- Order of St. Anne 3rd class with sword and bow, 1878
- Order of St. Stanislaus 2nd degree with swords, 1878
- Order of St. Anne 1st class with sword, 1906
- Order of St Vladimir, 2nd class, 1906
