= Nikolay Svyatopolk-Mirsky =

Russian general (1833–1898)

Prince Nikolai Ivanovich Svyatopolk-Mirsky
- Mikołaj Światopełk-Mirski
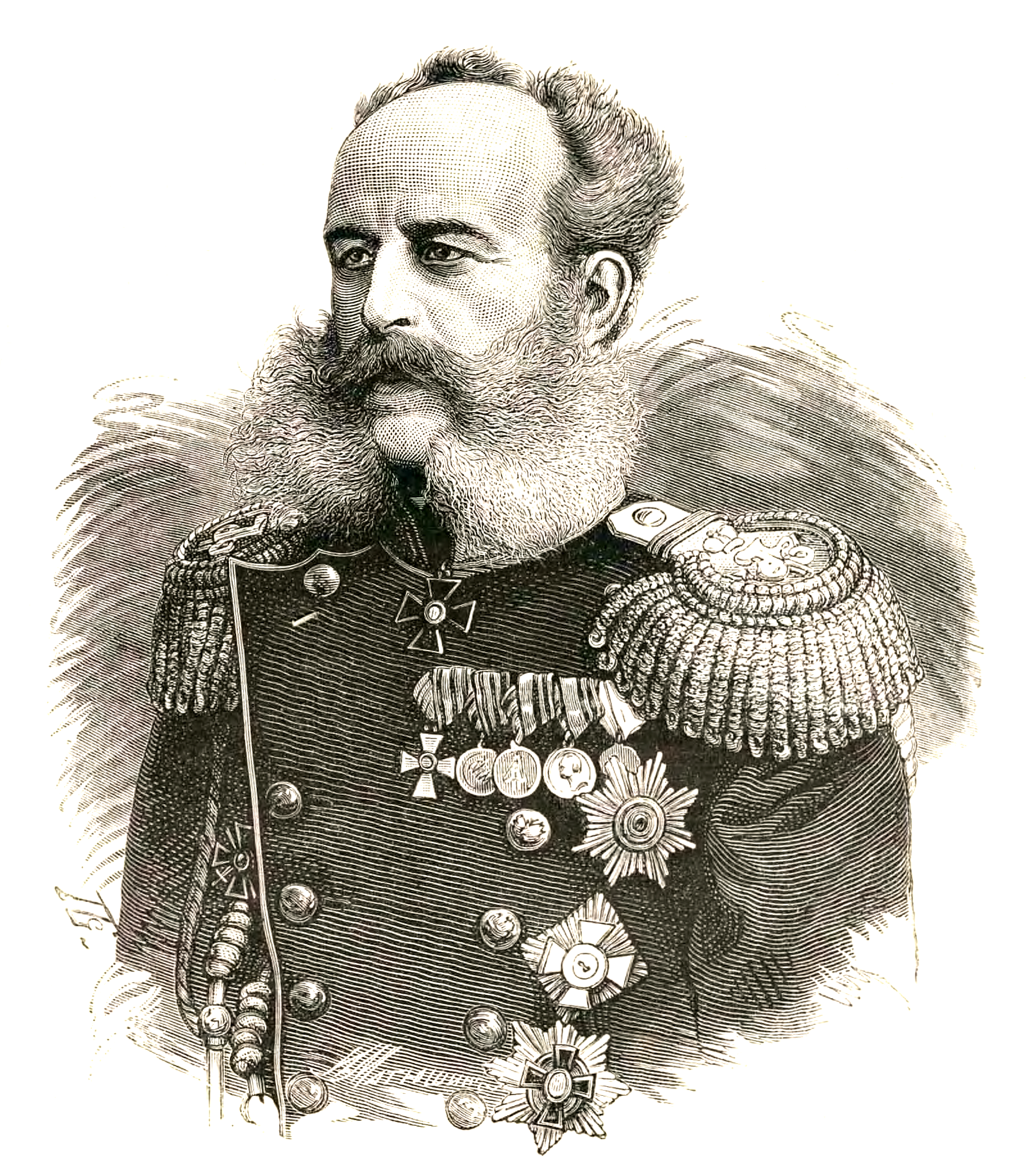
- Nikolay Svyatopolk-Mirsky (1877)
- Born: July 29, 1833; Saint Petersburg, Russian Empire
- Died: November 8, 1898 (aged 65); Novogrudsky Uyezd, Minsk Governorate
- Occupations: Cavalry general, politician

Prince Nikolai Ivanovich Svyatopolk-Mirsky (Russian: Николай Иванович Святополк-Мирский, Polish: Mikołaj Światopełk-Mirski; 29 July 1833 – 8 November 1898), of the Białynia clan, was a Russian cavalry general and politician. In 1895 he purchased the famed Mir Castle Complex, repaired and rebuilt it.

Nikolai was born to the family of Tomasz Bogumił Jan Mirski, the ambassador of the semi-independent Kingdom of Poland to Russia. Nikolai's patronymic Ivanovich was based on a Russified form of the third name of his father. Despite being a descendant of Polish szlachta he was brought up in Saint Petersburg and considered himself Russian.

Nikolai graduated from the Page Corps and later served in the Caucasus under Mikhail Semyonovich Vorontsov. During the Russo-Turkish War (1877–1878), he commanded a division that fought at the Battle of Shipka Pass. In 1881 he was appointed the ataman of the Don Cossack Voisko, the oldest and largest of the Cossack Hosts. In 1898 he became a member of the State Council of Imperial Russia.
