= History of Palestinian nationality =

Timeline of the Palestinian nationality

Palestinian citizenship developed during the 20th century, starting during the British Mandate era and in different form following the Oslo Peace process..

== British Mandate period ==
The Treaty of Lausanne, signed on 24 July 1923, came into force on 6 August 1924, and stated that the Ottoman nationals who were "habitually residents" of what became Mandate Palestine "will become ipso facto" Palestinian nationals. Article 7 of the Mandate for Palestine stipulated that the British mandatory power "shall be responsible for enacting a nationality law". The British authority via the structure of the British Mandate of Palestine was directed to "facilitate the acquisition of Palestinian citizenship by Jews who take up their permanent residence in Palestine." Article 15 stated that "No discrimination of any kind shall be made between the inhabitants of Palestine on the ground of race, religion or language. No person shall be excluded from Palestine on the sole ground of his religious belief."

The Palestinian Citizenship Order 1925 was enacted by Britain on 24 July 1925. It granted Palestinian citizenship to "Turkish subjects habitually resident in the territory of Palestine upon the 1st day of August, 1925". Transjordan was specifically excluded. Provision for citizenship under some conditions was also defined for some persons habitually resident abroad, as well as the children or wife of a Palestinian man. The Order contained no test based on race or religion, except that non-Arabs could opt out of Palestinian citizenship if they were accepted by another state in which their race was a majority.

This order applied until 14 May 1948, when the People's Council, representative of the Yishuv or Jewish Community, declared the creation of the State of Israel, "prepared to cooperate [...] in implementing" the relevant UN resolution.

== Post-Mandate ==
On the expiration of the British Mandate, the Mandate Palestinian nationality law ceased to apply. This meant that those who held Mandatory Palestinian citizenship had no citizenship under the law of any country, and the normal rights of citizenship depended on which country each person found themselves after the 1948 Arab–Israeli War. For Palestinian Arabs, this also depended on whether they were categorised as refugees in those countries. For example, Palestinians found themselves being categorised as Israeli-Palestinians, Jordanian-Palestinians, United Nations Relief and Works Agency Palestinians, and Gaza Palestinians, or Palestinians of another country.

=== Israel ===
On the establishment of Israel, the state had no citizenship law and, technically speaking, no citizens. Neither Jews nor Arabs had official citizenship status, but had identity cards or were issued Temporary Residence Permits. Until the Citizenship Law was passed on 14 July 1952, Israeli courts held that the former Palestinian citizenship, given by the British administration to Jews, Arabs and other inhabitants of the region, "devoid of substance," "not satisfactory and is inappropriate to the situation following the establishment of Israel". Voting rights for the 1949 and 1951 elections for the Knesset were based on residence and not nationality. Instead of passports, Israel issued what were described as travel documents that were valid for two years.

The Law of Return of 1950 recognised the right of any Jew (the term was undefined) to immigrate to Israel, but did not itself confer citizenship. Citizenship itself was granted by the Citizenship Law of 1952, which granted citizenship to any Jew who immigrated under the Law of Return. The law explicitly repealed the Palestinian Citizenship Order 1925 retroactively from the day of the establishment of the state. An Amendment in 1971 granted the right to citizenship to Jews who expressed the desire to immigrate to Israel, without taking any formal steps.

Arab Palestinians, as well as other non-Jews, wishing to obtain Israeli citizenship, had to prove that they had:

- been registered in the Inhabitants Registration in 1949;
- were residents of Israel on 14 July 1952;
- had been in Israel or in an area that later came into Israel between the establishment of Israel and 14 July 1952; or
- had entered legally during that period.

These proved difficult for many Palestinians to fulfill because many at the time had no proof of Palestinian citizenship, and those who had identity cards were forced to surrender them to the Israeli army during or soon after the war. Attaining status as a Registered Inhabitant was also difficult because there was a "deliberate attempt [by Israeli Forces] to not register many [Palestinian] villages". Those who failed to attain legal status remained in Israel as stateless persons.

An amendment to the Israeli Nationality Law was passed in 1968. This amendment stipulated that a Palestinian must apply within 3 years of turning 18 years of age, and had to prove that they had been a resident of Israel for five consecutive years prior to their application. A further amendment was passed in 1980 which alleviated the article that had previously required the applicant to have been in Israel between May 1948 and July 1952.

Following the 1980 amendment to Israel's Nationality Law, Palestinians are strictly legal citizens of the State of Israel. They have "passport citizenship" rights, but are excluded from several aspects of the Jewish welfare state and are therefore denied equal "democratic citizenship". While enjoying the fruits of Jewish civil rights (such as access to courts of law and private property) and political rights (access to the ballot and to government) they are denied social rights and economic rights in the form of social security, education and welfare, or access to land and water resources of the State.

=== Palestinians ===
In 2020, UN special rapporteur Francesca Albanese characterized the question of Palestinians' enduring statelessness as "particularly fraught" due to both the survival of the use of the concept of nationality as common identity and communal bond in the Palestinian context in particular, as it pertains to their exile and subsequent diaspora, and the confusion caused by less-than-full reinstatement of the concept of Palestinian citizenship, with the "significant exception" of those still with Jordanian conferred citizenship (who remained in Jordan after King Hussein ceded the West Bank in 1988). She characterized the de facto existence it may have as still being insufficient for the purpose of international law: "[S]ome of the functions that give purpose to [...] "the 'legal bond' that makes a person citizen of a state [...] exist" means "de facto citizenship may having a meaning in the perimeters of the State of Palestine's jurisdiction", e.g. the first Palestinian election held, being revived based on the in fieri realization of Palestinian self-determination. Albanese classified "important milestones" towards breaking the conditions of Article 1 of the Convention Relating to the Status of Stateless Persons which evaluates "statelessness" in opposition to being "considered 'citizens' of any state under the operation of its law", such as the "exercise [of] limited state functions" as a result of the Oslo Accords, and accordingly the Palestinian National Council's declaration of independence in 1988. However, it would be "premature" to argue that which requires a fully sovereign state, consisting of examples given of granting entry of persons to the country and the realization of most of the fundamental rights and freedoms, in accordance with its law, thus Palestinians remained over the threshold of eligibility to receive international protection as refugees and stateless persons. This argument was in response to one from Palestinian professor Mazin Qumsiyeh who, in commissioning the Draft Palestinian Nationality Law for the PLO in 2011, endorsed the status of de facto citizenship of the State of Palestine, inferring that the question of citizenship is based on the one of self-determination, though calling it merely "not comparable" to the status of citizens of fully sovereign states. Albanese considered her reasoning as explaining the lack of the law's adoption.

==== Living in the West Bank ====
The citizenship of Palestinians living on the West Bank, within the Hashemite Kingdom of Jordan, went through three stages.

After the creation of the state of Israel and before the passing of a new Jordanian Citizenship Law in 1954, Palestinians were incorporated into the Kingdom of Jordan.

In 1949, the Jordanian Council of Ministers added an article to their Citizenship Law of 1928 that read:

All those who at the time when this Law goes into effect habitually reside in Transjordan or in the Western part [of the Jordan] which is being administered by [the Kingdom], and who were holders of Palestinian citizenship, shall be deemed as Jordanians enjoying all rights of Jordanians and bearing all the attendant obligations.

A new Citizenship Law was passed in 1954. It granted Jordanian citizenship to the Palestinians living in the West Bank and refugees that had fled during the war. The third stage of citizenship for Jordanian-Palestinians began on the 31 of July 1988 when Jordan severed its relationship with the West Bank: they now decreed all those residing in the West Bank as "Palestinians".

==== UNRWA ====
Following the 1948 war, the United Nations General Assembly established the United Nations Relief and Works Agency for Palestinian Refugees in the Near East (UNRWA) to give direct aid to the Palestinians that had fled from the war. These refugees were located in five neighbouring Arab states, and these countries granted Palestinians traveling documents, which granted them few rights, but not citizenship. The Casablanca Protocol of 1965, which was passed by the League of Arab States, resolved to grant the Palestinians living in the host countries the right to work in, travel from and return to the country of their residence, obtain traveling documents and receive entry visas to the Arab countries as any other national.

==== Lebanon ====
When Palestinians arrived in Lebanon in 1948 they were warmly received. In 1959 the Palestinian Refugees Department was created and charged with dealing with refugee affairs, namely issuing travel documents, regulating personal status affairs such as birth and death certificates, locating sites for refugee camps, and so on. Palestinian refugees were issued travel documents that allowed them to travel abroad and to return to Lebanon. Refugees were also allowed, like Lebanese citizens, to travel between Syria and Lebanon without travel documents.

In 1995, the minister of interior issued Decree No. 478 which provided that Palestinians who have been refugees in Lebanon since 1948 have to apply for an exit visa from Lebanon and an entry visa to return to Lebanon.

The right to work in Lebanon was also granted to Palestinians u der the Labour Law of 1962. This decreed that a foreigner is allowed to work in Lebanon provided that his country allows Lebanese to work in that country, and that he obtains in advance a work permit. The first half of that regulation was problematic for Palestinians due to the lack of the principle of reciprocity – no state of Palestine existed to enact a reciprocity rule. As for the second half of the rule, the Lebanese authorities issued a list of 60 activities that excluded workers with permits – this list excluded almost all menial jobs. The result of this law has been that more than one-half of the Palestinian refugees currently live below the poverty line.

==== Egypt ====
Palestinians in the Gaza Strip were issued with Egyptian travel documents which allowed them to move outside of the Gaza Strip, and Egypt. Their status as refugees has been deteriorating rapidly since the 1970s. After 1948 they were allowed rights similar to Egyptian nationals, and in 1963 they were allowed to own agricultural land, nor did they have to acquire work visas. In 1964 the government decreed that Palestinian refugees had to obtain an exit visa, an entry visa or a transit visa. In 1976 a law was passed stating that no foreigners could own real property, although Palestinians were later granted the right to own agricultural land. In 1978 the ability of Palestinians to work in the civil service was revoked. Gradually the process of attaining travel documents for Palestinians has become more difficult. Jordanian Palestinians who hold two year passports are now required to obtain entry and exit visas to travel to Egypt.

==== Syria ====
Syria afforded Palestinians refugees all rights of residence, travel, work, business, and ownership on a temporary basis in 1948. In 1956 this status was cemented in the Law No. 260. Its first article states that all Palestinians residing in Syria at the date of its issuance shall be considered as Syrians in areas of employment, labour, trade, and national service provided they keep their Palestinian Citizenship. They thus enjoy equal rights in all aspects. They have equal rights of employment, in both public and private sectors, and are entitled to social security benefits, labour benefits, residence, education and travel. With regards to travel, the Syrian government issued Palestinian refugees with travel documents.

==== Iraq ====
Those who fled to Iraq enjoy equal rights concerning residence, work, and ownership of residential areas. They also have the right to join the civil service, with all the subsequent benefits. Given the current economic and political situation in Iraq, the quality of life for Palestinian refugees residing there has a questionable future.

==== Oslo Peace Process ====
===== Palestinian Nationality Authority defines "Palestinian" =====
The Palestinian National Authority drafted, but did not pass, a piece of legislation in 1995 outlining its Citizenship Law. Article 7 of this legislation defines a Palestinian as anyone who "(1) was a holder of Palestinian citizenship (other than Jews) before 15 May 1948; (2) was born to a Palestinian father; (3) was born in Palestine to a Palestinian mother even if the citizenship of the father is not known; (4) was born in Palestine to unknown parents; and (5) was born outside of Palestine to a Palestinian mother and to a father whose nationality was not known – provided that this person opts for Palestinian citizenship within one year after reaching maturity, that he notifies the minister of interior of his intention to become a Palestinian citizen, that he becomes habitually a resident of Palestine, and that the minister does not object to this applicant within one year from the time he receives the notice from the applicant.

This Draft law does not take into account those Palestinians living in their diaspora. The PNA’s draft Citizenship Law does not address the criteria in terms of which the UNRWA-Palestinians could attain citizenship. The PNA’s concept of citizenship, when combined with their Election Law, incorporates the concepts of jus soli, jus sanguinis and naturalization.

===== Doctrine of return =====
Resolution 194 of the UN General Assembly in 1948, "refugees wishing to return to their homes and live at peace with their neighbours should be permitted to do so." But the Resolution also states: "Instructs the Conciliation Commission to facilitate the repatriation, resettlement and economic and social rehabilitation of the refugees" as an alternative to "return". Some argue that this has been converted into customary international law, enshrined as 'the right of return,' but UN General Assembly Resolutions do not establish international law. Those who argue for a right of return usually support a geographical basis as opposed to a religious one. But so-called "right of return" is not the equivalent of the Israeli Law of Return (1950) which grants citizenship to any Jewish person and their family wishing to enter Israel.

==== Citizenship Regulation ====
The PNA's draft Citizenship Law bestows the executive branch the right to grant, annul, or withdraw citizenship.

== See also ==
- Palestinian Citizenship Order 1925
- Ottoman Nationality Law of 1869
- 2017 Hamas charter
