= Israeli Citizenship Revocation Law =

Proposed Israeli law

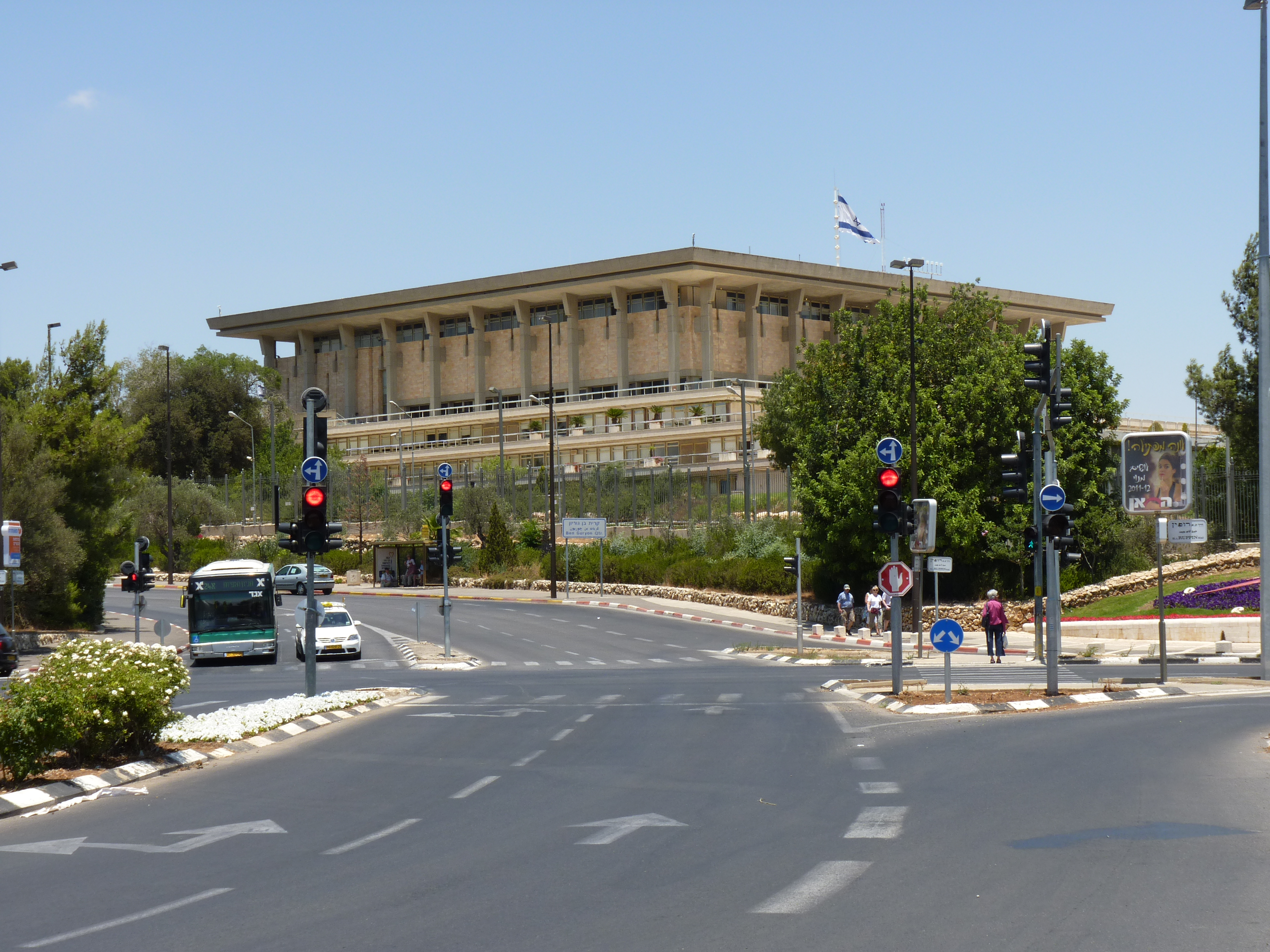

Knesset
- Territorial extent: Israel
- Introduced by: Ministry of Interior

The Israeli Citizenship Revocation Law is a proposed Israeli law announced by Prime Minister Benjamin Netanyahu in September 2026 that would revoke the citizenship of anyone who defames Israel or Israel Defense Forces (IDF) soldiers around the world. The law was proposed by 16 September 2026 by Netanyahu in a video posted on X, along with another law that would increase "the defamation damages they can be sued for twentyfold."

The proposed law was announced in response to the 2026 premiere of British documentary film NAZA, directed by Israeli journalists Yuval Abraham and Rachel Szor, which shows "in detail the systems behind Israel’s calculated mass killing of Palestinian civilians in Gaza". The film features interviews with 24 Israeli intelligence officers and soldiers.

== Background ==
In July 2022, the Supreme Court of Israel upheld the Citizenship and Entry into Israel Law, which allows for the revocation of citizenship for Israelis carrying out actions to be considered a breach of trust against the state.

Following the premiere of NAZA at the 2026 Venice Film Festival, on 14 September 2026, Israel minister of culture Miki Zohar wrote a letter to the Interior Ministry and Population and Immigration Authority and threatening the revoking of Abraham and Szor's Israeli citizenship. In a statement, Zohar wrote, "This morning, I wrote to the director general of the Population and Immigration Authority and the director general of the interior ministry, asking them to examine the possibility of revoking the Israeli citizenship of the creators of the anti-Israel film NZA [sic] for breach of loyalty to the state and collaboration with the enemy."

== Legislative history ==
The bill is expected to be submitted by the Ministry of the Interior to the Knesset.

Netanyahu claimed that all Zionist factions in the Knesset to support both laws.

== Reaction ==
=== Opposition ===
On 17 September 2026, the Committee to Protect Journalists released a statement condemning the proposed law, describing it as a "dangerous escalation in official efforts to intimidate and punish journalists."

== See also ==
- Shamima Begum
- IDF Defamation Law
- Nuremberg Laws
