= Mir Ghetto =

Nazi ghetto in occupied Belarus

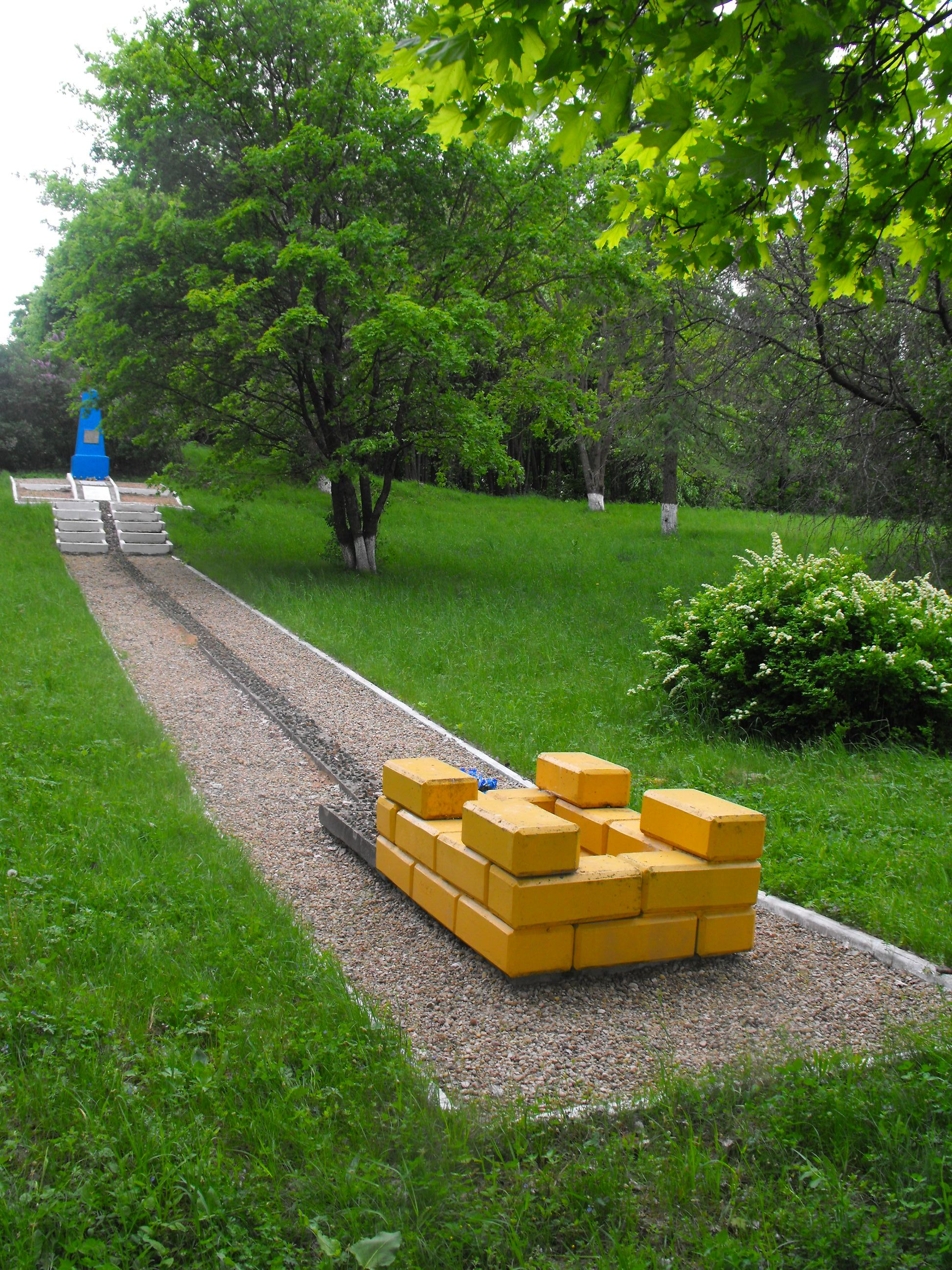
- Portion of the monument to the victims of the Mir Ghetto
- Location: Mir, Reichskommissariat Ostland; 53°27′N 26°28′E
- Date: September 1941–13 August 1942
- Incident type: Imprisonment, mass shootings, forced labour
- Participants: Einsatzgruppen; Wehrmacht; Belarusian Auxiliary Police; Lithuanian Auxiliary Police Battalions
- Victims: approximately 2,900

The Mir Ghetto was a Nazi ghetto in Mir, Belarus during World War II. It housed at least 3,000 Jews, of whom about 2,900 were exterminated as part of the Holocaust. The Mir Ghetto is famous outside of Belarus primarily for its 9 November 1941 massacre, in which 1,800 Jews were slaughtered by German forces and collaborators.

== Background and establishment ==
Prior to the outbreak of World War II, over 2,000 Jews lived in the city of Mir, Belarus, in what was then the Second Polish Republic. Mir, much like many other cities in Belarus, was considered a shtetl, and was renowned in the Jewish world as a centre of Jewish learning. Among the city's landmarks was the Mir Yeshiva, which operated intermittently until the Soviet invasion of Poland in 1939.

On 27 June 1941, Mir was occupied by Nazi Germany. The occupation lasted until 7 July 1944. With the city being occupied only 35 days after the beginning of Operation Barbarossa, there was little time to escape, and Jews who had fled nearby settlements and western Poland accumulated in Mir alongside the existing Jewish community. Three months after the occupation began, a ghetto was formally established within the city by German authorities, and all Jews living within the town - then about 3,000 - were forcibly resettled within it.

The first mass killings, however, began even prior to the ghetto's establishment; on 20 July 1941, 20 Jews were executed by the Germans. This was followed by a mass execution on 9 November 1941, where 1,800 Jews were killed indiscriminately in the streets of Mir and outside Mir Castle, being buried in mass graves at the castle's walls. These killings continued into 1942, with executions on 2 March of that year killing 750 people. Multiple groups participated in these killings, including the Einsatzgruppen, the Wehrmacht, and the 11th Lithuanian Auxiliary Police Battalion.

== Mir Castle Ghetto ==
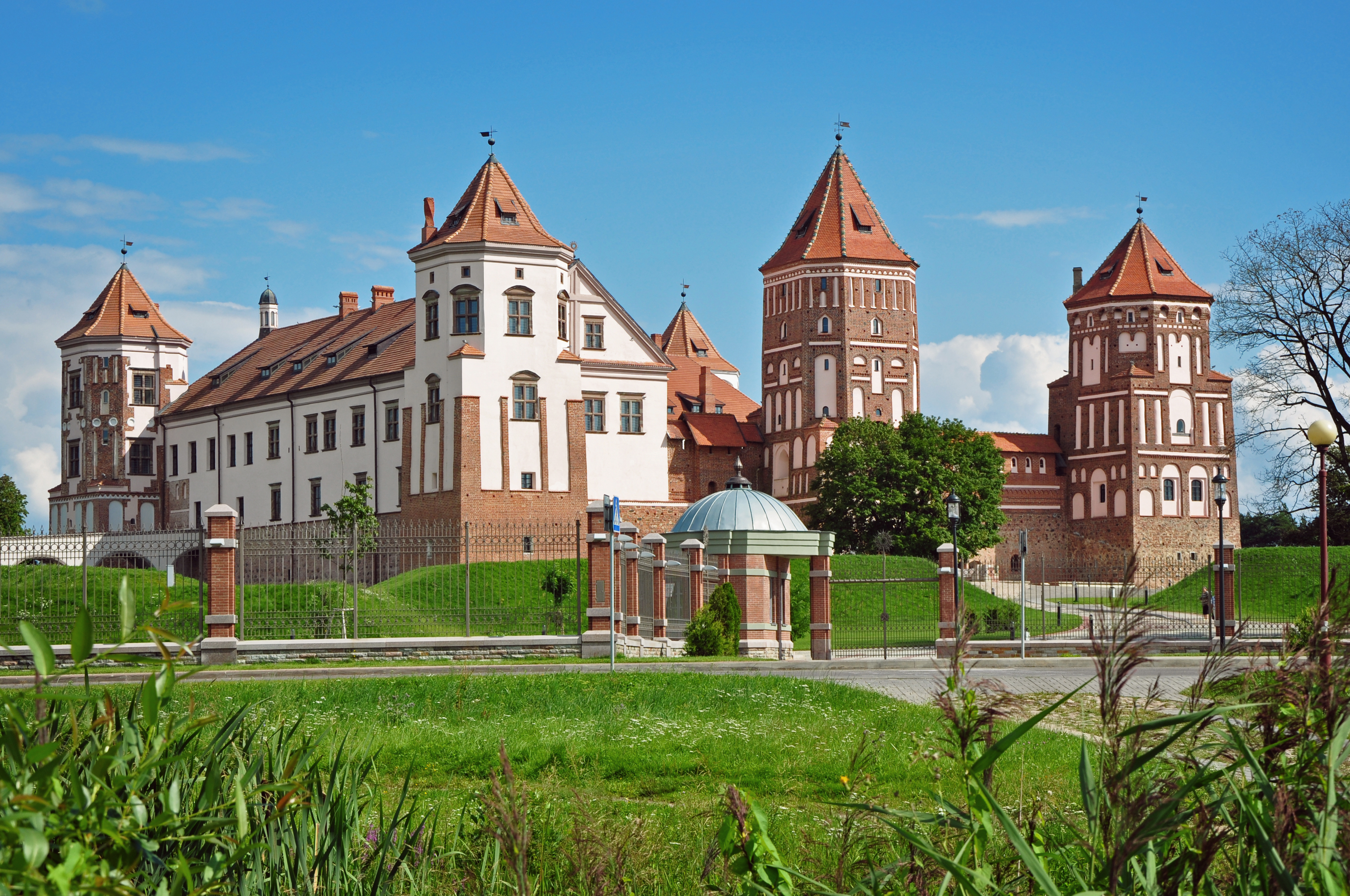
Mir Castle, pictured in 2011.

By May 1942, around 850 Jews in the Mir Ghetto were still alive. The German authorities decided to transfer them to Mir Castle, in the process further isolating the Jews from the non-Jewish population of Mir. Several checkpoints were established along the complex's perimeter. The ghetto's inhabitants were regularly required to perform forced labour, primarily by the clearing of rubble after bombings by Allied forces.

== Liquidation ==
In the weeks preceding the ghetto's liquidation, Oswald Rufeisen, a resistance leader who had embedded himself within Belarusian Auxiliary Police forces in the area, revealed to the ghetto's inhabitants that they would soon be killed. Many people prayed or committed suicide, but the ghetto's resistance organised the escape of 150-300 people on 9 August. The Mir Ghetto was liquidated on 13 August 1942, with 719 remaining Jews being killed. In total, around 2,900 people were exterminated during the time of the Mir Ghetto's existence.

== Resistance ==
A resistance group of around 80 people, under the leadership of Oswald Rufeisen, operated in Mir Ghetto. During the ghetto's last days, it organised a plan to help 150-300 of the ghetto's inhabitants escape into the forest, where they joined the Bielski and Soviet partisans.

== Legacy ==
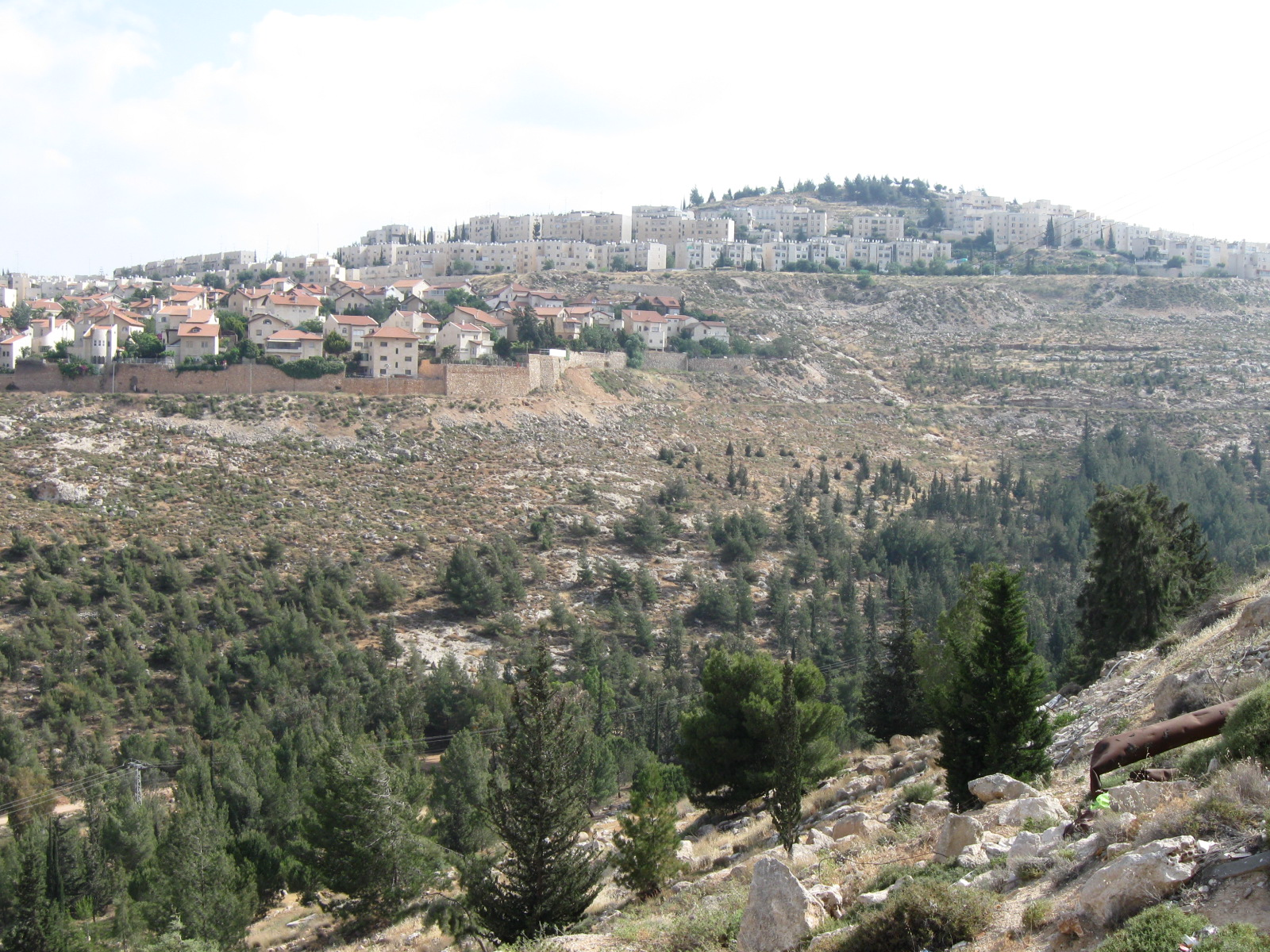
The Mir Forest, near Jerusalem.

Several monuments to the Mir Ghetto exist, both within Belarus and Israel. The four monuments in Belarus were all erected between 1966 and 1967. Near Jerusalem, the Mir Forest was planted by the Jewish National Fund as a memorial to those killed during the Mir Ghetto. Another memorial exists at Nahalat Yitzhak Cemetery, where a ceremony is held yearly on 9 November in honour of those killed.

In July 1995, former Belarusian Auxiliary Policeman Szymon Serafinowicz was arrested at his home in Banstead, being charged with killing three Jews under the War Crimes Act 1991. Though he was ultimately ruled unfit for trial due to dementia, Serafinowicz's trial marked the first time a war criminal had been tried in the United Kingdom.
