= Palestinian Citizenship Order 1925 =

Former law in Mandatory Palestine

- Statutory Rules and Orders
- Parliament of the United Kingdom
- Citation: SR&O 1925/777
- Territorial extent: Mandatory Palestine

Dates
- Made: 24 July 1925
- Commencement: 1 August 1925
- Repealed: 14 May 1948

Other legislation
- Made under: Foreign Jurisdiction Act 1890
- Repealed by: Nationality Law, 5712-1952

Status: Repealed

The Palestinian Citizenship Order 1925 (SR&O 1925/777) was a law of Mandatory Palestine that created a Palestinian citizenship for residents of the territory of Palestine Mandate. It was promulgated on 24 July 1925 and came into force on 1 August 1925. The order remained in effect until 14 May 1948, when the British withdrew from the Mandate, and Palestinian citizenship came to an end. Israel enacted a Citizenship Law in 1952, while West Bank residents came under Jordan’s nationality law.

== Key terms ==
The law gave effect to Article 7 of the Mandate for Palestine, which stated:

"The Administration of Palestine shall be responsible for enacting a nationality law. There shall be included in this law provisions framed so as to facilitate the acquisition of Palestinian citizenship by Jews who take up their permanent residence in Palestine."

It also gave effect to the Treaty of Lausanne, which came into force on 6 August 1924, and stated that the Ottoman nationals who were "habitually residents" of what became Palestine "will become ipso facto" nationals of that territory.

The order granted Palestinian citizenship to "Turkish subjects habitually resident in the territory of Palestine upon the 1st day of August, 1925". Transjordan was specifically excluded. Under some circumstances citizenship was also conferred on some persons habitually resident abroad, as well as the children or wife of a Palestinian man. The order contained no test based on race or religion, except that people in the non-majority race could opt out of Palestinian citizenship if they were accepted by another state in which their race was a majority.

Ottoman citizenship arose from the Ottoman Nationality Law of 1869, which created a common Ottoman citizenship irrespective of religious or ethnic affiliation.

Under the order, Palestinian citizenship could be acquired by:

- natural change from Ottoman to Palestinian citizenship (part I of the order)
- birth to a father who was a Palestine citizen himself, or birth within Palestine without acquiring the nationality of any other state (part II of the order)
- naturalization following a period of residence in Palestine (part III of the order)

Palestinian citizens had the right of abode in Palestine, but were not British subjects, and were instead considered British protected persons.

== Excerpts ==
The Palestinian Citizenship Order 1925

NOW THEREFORE, His Majesty by virtue and in exercise of the powers in his behalf by the Foreign Jurisdiction Act 1890, or otherwise, in His Majesty vested, is pleased by and with the advice of His Privy Council to order, and it is ordered as follows:–

PART 1.

1. (1) Turkish subjects habitually resident in the territory of Palestine upon the 1st day of August 1924 shall become Palestine citizens.

(2) Any person over eighteen years of age who by virtue of this Article becomes a Palestinian citizen may within a period of two years from the 6th day of August, 1924, by declaration made as hereinafter provided state his option for Turkish nationality and subject to the provisions of this Article shall cease to be a Palestinian citizen [...]

(3) Any person over eighteen years of age who by virtue of clause (1) of this Article becomes a Palestinian citizen and differs in race from the majority of the population of Palestine may in the like manner and subject to the same conditions opt for the nationality of one of the States in which the majority of the population is of the same race as the person exercising the right to opt subject to the consent of that State and he shall thereupon cease to be a Palestinian citizen.

Article 21: Definitions

For the purpose of this Order:

1. The expression "Palestine" includes the territories to which the mandate for Palestine applies, except such parts of the territories comprised in Palestine to the east of Jordan and the Dead Sea as were defined by Order of the High Commissioner dated the first of September 1922.

2. The expression "Palestinian citizen" means a person who is by birth or becomes by naturalisation or otherwise a Palestinian citizen.

SCHEDULE

OATH OF ALLEGIANCE

"I, A.B., Swear by Almighty God that I will be Faithful and Loyal to the Government of Palestine."

== Palestine natives living abroad ==
Regarding persons living outside Palestine, the Order made the following allowance.

Persons of over eighteen years of age who were born within Palestine and acquired on birth ... Turkish nationality and on the 1st day of August 1925, are habitually resident abroad, may acquire Palestinian citizenship by opting in such manner ... subject to the consent of the government of Palestine which may be granted or withheld in its absolute discretion ... . This right of option must be exercised within two years of the coming into force of this Order.

However, in November 1925, The High Commissioner amended the last sentence of the above to read "two years from the 6th day of August, 1924", thereby leaving only nine months for applications. This gave many people insufficient time to apply, creating a large class of Palestinian natives whose only citizenship was Turkish. This situation was not rectified until 1939 when, acting on a recommendation of the Peel Commission, another two years was provided.

== See also ==
- Palestine Order in Council
- Israeli nationality law
- History of Palestinian nationality
- Ottoman Nationality Law of 1869

== Sources ==
- Hurewitz, J. C. "Diplomacy in the Near and Middle East: A Documentary Record 1914-1956" (New York: Praeger, 1956)
