= Palestine Order in Council =

Constitutional document of Mandatory Palestine

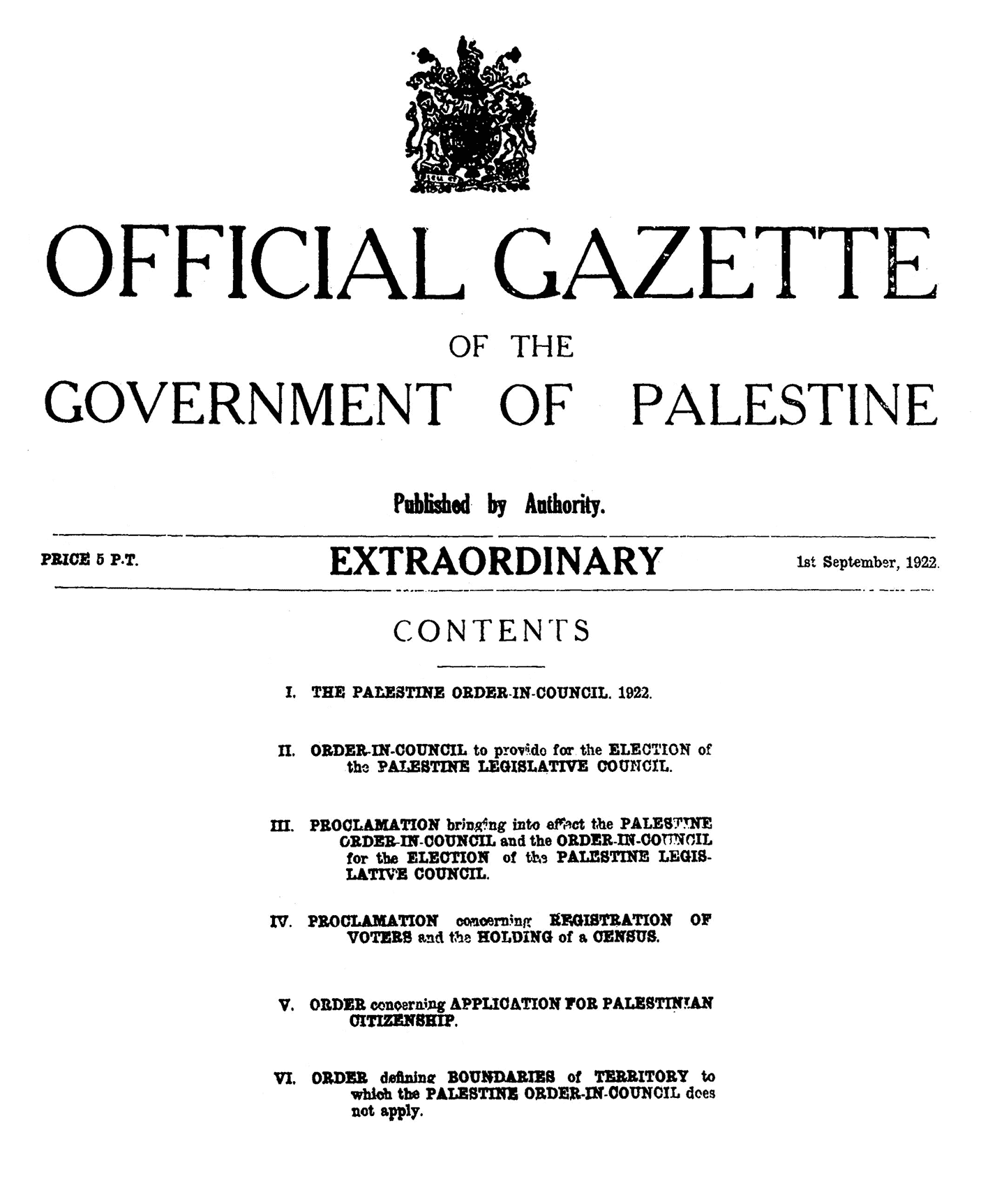
Cover page of the Palestine Order-in-Council.

The Palestine Order-in-Council, 1922, was the constitutional document of Mandatory Palestine. It was first published on 1 September 1922 in an Extraordinary Issue of the Palestine Gazette.

The order-in-council, which was published approximately two weeks after the League of Nations approval of the Mandate for Palestine, officially replaced the British military occupation of Palestine, which had been in force since the end of World War I, with a civil administration.

With its publication in 1922, the order-in-council included the following terms:

- Part I. Preliminary (Articles 1 to 3): Definitions and interpretative rules.
- Part II. Executive (Articles 4 to 16): Definition of the role and authority of the High Commissioner for Palestine
- Part III. Legislature (Articles 17 to 34): Stated that laws would be enacted by a future Legislative Council, which will replace the then-current advisory council, and defined the Legislative Council's composition and authority.
- Part IV. Application of certain British statutes (Articles 35 to 37): Application of the laws named in the Schedule to the Foreign Jurisdiction Act 1890, with certain changes.
- Part V. Judiciary (Articles 38 to 67): Defined the system of courts and tribunals:
  - The civil court system would have three levels: Magistrates' Courts, District Courts, and a Supreme Court.
  - There were also established a Court of Criminal Assize for crimes punishable by death, Land Courts for settling real estate disputes, and Tribal Courts in the district of Beersheba.
  - Supreme Court decisions were appealable to the Privy Council of the United Kingdom.
  - Article 46 left in place the Ottoman legislation made up until the Ottoman Empire's entry to World War I (1 November 1914), but also required the courts to rule according to the Mandate's own legislation and with English common law and the rules of equity
  - Articles 47 and 51 defined jurisdiction over personal status matters.
  - Article 52 defined the jurisdiction of Muslim religious courts, article 53 defined the jurisdiction of Jewish religious courts, and article 54 defined the jurisdiction of Christian religious courts.
  - Article 55 authorized the creation of a special tribunal to rule on personal status questions which concern different religious communities and on disputes about the exclusive jurisdiction of religious courts.
  - Jurisdiction over foreign subjects was also defined.
- Part VI. Removal and Deportation (Articles 68 to 72): Deals with the possibility of deportation of prisoners and political offenders.
- Part VII. Validation of Ordinances and Indemnification (Articles 73 to 80): Retroactively validated the ordinances, orders, and other legislations made by the military administration, and also repeals legislations and orders listed in the Schedule to the order in council.
- Part VIII. General (Articles 81 to 90): Contained General provisions.
  - Article 82 defined three official languages: English, Arabic, and Hebrew.
  - Article 83 guaranteed freedom of religion and freedom of conscience.
  - Article 86 excluded the Emirate of Transjordan from Mandatory Palestine.

== Later developments ==
In accordance with the Mandate for Palestine, the Order in Council prescribed that a representative body called the Legislative Council would be elected. Subject to the veto of the High Commissioner, it would have the power to pass ordinances and other regulations. An election was proclaimed for 1923, but it was boycotted by Arab Palestinians. In 1923, an amendment to the Order in Council rendered null and void the results of the election, and instead granted the High Commissioner the power to establish ordinances by proclamation. Another attempt to establish a Legislative Council in the 1930s was abandoned due to pressure from the Zionist organizations, who feared it would give too much power to the Arab majority.

In the months before the British departure from Palestine, the 1922 Order in Council was supplemented by the Palestine Order in Council, 1948, which gave the High Commissioner power to "by Order make such provision as appears to him in his sole discretion to be expedient for the Government of Palestine until the withdrawal of His Majesty from the Government of Palestine, or in contemplation of or preparation for that withdrawal", subject only to the oversight of the British crown. This Order in Council was laid before Parliament on January 27, 1948 and came into effect on March 1, 1948. In Israel, most of its provisions were effectively replaced first by the Law and Administration Ordinance of 1948, then by the Transition Law of 1949, and eventually by the Basic Laws of Israel.

Today, part of the order-in-council remains in effect in Israel and the Palestinian territories.

=== Reception into Israeli law ===
On 14 May 1948, the Provisional State Council declared that the laws of Mandatory Palestine would continue in force in the state of Israel other than several which limited Jewish immigration and land acquisition. This was codified by the Law and Administration Ordinance of 21 May 1948.

== See also ==
- Palestinian Citizenship Order 1925
- Basic Laws of Israel
- Constitution of Palestine

== Bibliography ==
- Kellermann, Alfred E.; Siehr, Kurt; Einhorn, Talia (16 December 1998). Israel Among the Nations: International and Comparative Law Perspectives on Israel's 50th Anniversary. Martinus Nijhoff Publishers. ISBN 978-90-411-1142-5.
- Mogannam, Mogannam E. (1932). "Palestine Legislation under the British". The Annals of the American Academy of Political and Social Science. 164: 47–54. doi:10.1177/000271623216400108. JSTOR 1018957. S2CID 144218835.
