= Amendment No. 28 to the Entry Into Israel Law =

2017 Israeli law

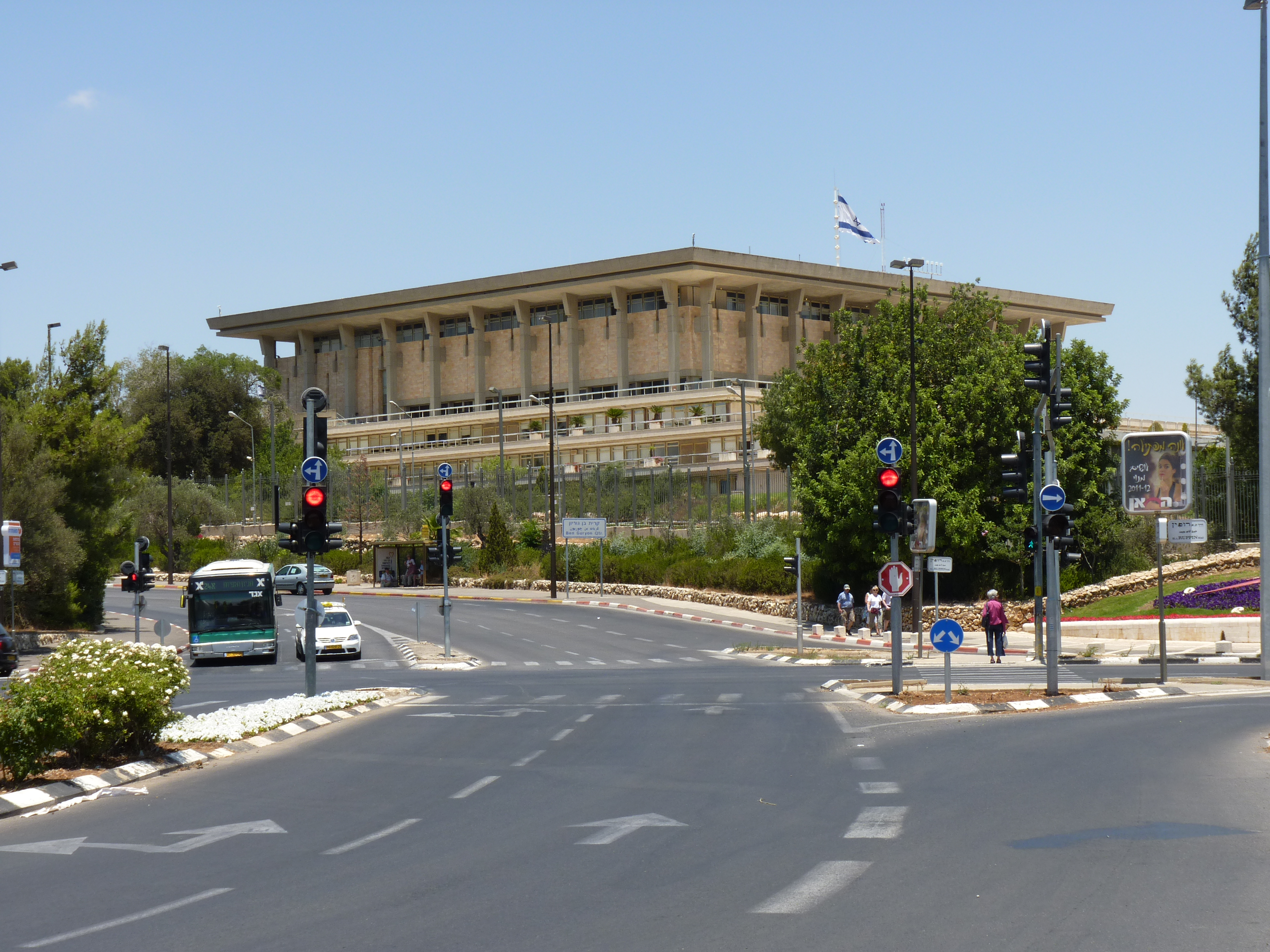

Knesset
- Enacted by: Knesset
- Enacted: 6 March 2017
- Introduced by: Bezalel Smotrich (Jewish Home); Roy Folkman (Kulanu)

Summary
- Prohibiting entry, visa, and residency permits to any foreigner who "knowingly issues a public call for boycotting Israel that, given the content of the call and the circumstances in which it was issued, has a reasonable possibility of leading to the imposition of a boycott – if the issuer was aware of this possibility"

The Amendment No. 28 to the Entry Into Israel Law (No. 5712-1952) prohibits the entry into Israel of any foreigner who makes a "public call for boycotting Israel", or any area under its control. It denies entry, visa, and residency permits to these affected foreigners.

The law was a response to the BDS movement which calls for comprehensive boycotts of Israel "until it complies with international law". Detractors compared the law to U.S. President Trump's recently passed "Muslim travel ban", and claimed that it violated the right to freedom of speech. It has also been criticized for failing to distinguish between those who call for a boycott of Israel and those who call for a boycott of the Israeli settlements. Supporters of the law defend it as within Israel's rights to control its borders, and as a legitimate counter-measure against its opponents.

The law was passed by the Knesset on March 6, 2017, by a 46-28 vote.

== Background ==
The Entry Into Israel Law of 1952 gave discretion to the Minister of the Interior to bar any individual, including a visa holder, from entering the country. Prior to the amendment, Israeli authorities "felt free" to detain or question critics of Israel when they attempted to enter the country.

American academic Norman Finkelstein was deported and given a 10-year ban in 2008, and American political activist Noam Chomsky was denied entry in 2010. In December 2016, Israel refused entry to a Malawian tourist, after officials discovered she was active in the World Council of Churches, an organization which calls for the boycott of products made in Israel's West Bank settlements.

BDS is a global campaign attempting to leverage economic and political pressure on Israel to end its occupation of Palestinian land and the Golan Heights; introduce full equality for Arab-Palestinian citizens of Israel; and acknowledge the right of return of Palestinian refugees. Prime Minister Benyamin Netanyahu has made it a priority of his administration to fight the BDS Movement.

== Passage ==
The bill was submitted by Israeli lawmakers Bezalel Smotrich from the Jewish Home party and Roy Folkman from Kulanu. It passed its first reading in mid-January 2017. The Israeli parliament (Knesset) approved the law in its final reading on March 6 by a vote of 46-28. The bill was passed after a heated debate; it was supported by right-wing, religious, and centrist parties, but opposed by left-wing parties and human rights groups.

== Provision ==
The legislation bars the issuance of visas and residency permits to public supporters of boycotts against Israel. According to the legislation, the ban will apply to any non-citizen and non-permanent resident "who knowingly issues a public call for boycotting Israel that, given the content of the call and the circumstances in which it was issued, [which] has a reasonable possibility of leading to the imposition of a boycott – if the issuer was aware of this possibility." This means that it does not apply to every individual who supports a boycott; rather, it applies only to those who issued a public call with a "reasonable possibility" of leading to an actual boycott. According to the Israeli newspaper Haaretz, the Israeli authorities and the courts are given leeway in interpreting the law, and eventually deciding how this distinction will be applied.

The law bars the issuance of a visa or residency permit for the targeted foreigners, but allows the Ministry of the Interior to grant exemptions at its discretion. The law could also affect Palestinian temporary residents in Israel whose applications for Israeli permanent residency are pending. The Israeli Justice Ministry had unsuccessfully asked the bill's drafters for such cases to be exempted.

The law is aimed at not only those who call for a total boycott of Israel, but also those advocating boycotts of "any area under its control" – a reference to the Israeli settlements. Thus, the law also applies to organizations such as the World Council of Churches, which opposes a general boycott against Israel, but supports boycotts against the settlements because the settlements are illegal under international law.

== Reactions ==
=== Supporters ===
Strategic Affairs Minister Gilad Erdan defended the ban, saying that, like every country, Israel "has the right to determine who enters its borders", and that the ban was an effort against "those who seek to delegitimize Israel, while hiding behind the language of human rights". Minister of Education Naftali Bennett supported the law because it allowed Israel to "protect itself against conspirators".

=== Critics ===
Human rights groups Adalah and the Association for Civil Rights in Israel criticized the ban, arguing that it violates the "most basic tenets of democracy" to grant entry based on political opinion. Kenneth Bob, president of American leftist Zionist organization Ameinu, said that the legislation reinforces the claim that Israel uses "the power of the state to violate the freedom of speech of their opponents". David Harris, the chief executive of the American Jewish Committee who has been active in countering the BDS movement, said that the ban would neither help defeat BDS nor help Israel's international image.

The World Council of Churches criticized the law's lack of distinction between those who call for a total boycott of Israel, and those who support Israel. but encourage boycotts against products from the settlements.

== Impact ==
According to The Independent, British former Labour Party leader Jeremy Corbyn, who has supported "targeted boycotts" against the "illegal settlements in the West Bank", might be impacted by the ban, along with "dozens" of other British Members of Parliament. Hannah Weisfeld, the director of British Jewish organisation Yachad, said that, given that the majority of the Jewish community considered the settlements "a barrier to peace", British visitors with relatives in Israel might be affected by the ban.

Olav Fykse Tveit, the general secretary of the World Council of Churches, said that the law would prevent him or other senior leaders of the organization from visiting the holy sites in Israel and the West Bank. The World Council of Churches holds that the Israeli settlements are illegal, and encourages the use of boycotts against the settlements.

The law also affects Palestinians who need temporary residency permits to stay with their spouses in Israel, while their family unification process is pending. Human rights group Adalah said that the law would lead to the "separation between spouses and children".

The law has, since its enactment in 2017, been used on multiple occasions to deny entry to human rights activists and BDS supporters.

On January 7, 2018, the Ministry of Strategic Affairs published a list of 20 non-government organizations whose officials would be banned from entering the country. The list included several chapters of the BDS, such as the Palestinian BDS National Committee, BDS France, BDS South Africa, BDS Italy, BDS Chile, BDS Kampagne, but also the British anti-poverty group War on Want, the American Friends Service Committee, and Jewish Voice for Peace. The list has also been used to prevent Arab MKs from going on trips abroad to meet with groups on the list.

Also in 2018, Lara Alqasem, a 22-year-old U.S. citizen with Palestinian ancestry, flew to Israel with a valid student visa, but was barred from entering and ordered to be deported because of her history of activism with the BDS movement and Students for Justice in Palestine. She then appealed to the Israeli Supreme Court, claiming she was no longer active in these movements, and the Court overturned her deportation.

On 15 August 2019, Israel caused some controversy by refusing entry to two US congresspersons, Rashida Tlaib and Ilhan Omar, known for their support for BDS.

As of 2020, Israel has denied entry to 16 people based on the law, including seven French politicians and European Union parliamentarians.

== See also ==
- Anti-BDS laws
