= IDF Defamation Law =

Proposed Israeli law

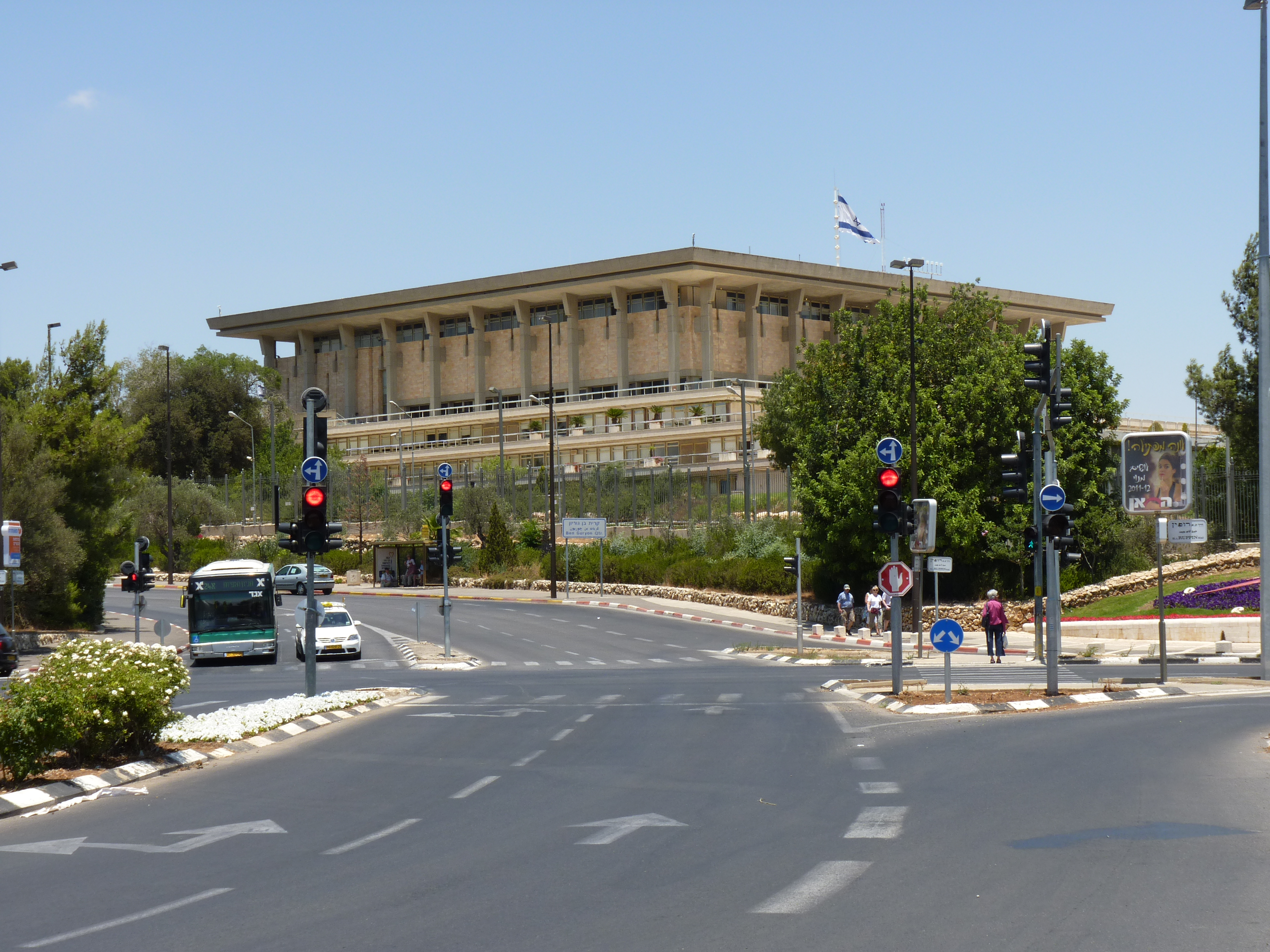

Knesset
- Territorial extent: Israel
- Introduced by: Ministry of Justice

The IDF Defamation Law is a proposed Israeli law announced by Prime Minister Benjamin Netanyahu in September 2026 to double the statutory damages for defamation of soldiers in the Israel Defense Forces (IDF) without proof of damage to 1 million shekels. The law was proposed by September 16, 2026 by Netanyahu in a video posted on X, along with another law that would revoke the citizenship of those who defame Israel of the Israel Defense Forces.

The laws were announced in response to the 2026 premiere of British documentary film NAZA, co-directed by Israeli citizens Yuval Abraham and Rachel Szor, which shows "in detail the systems behind Israel’s calculated mass killing of Palestinian civilians in Gaza". The film features interviews with 24 Israeli intelligence officers and soldiers.

== Legislative history ==
The law is expected to be introduced to the Knesset by the Ministry of Justice.

== See also ==
- Israeli Citizenship Revocation Law
