= Neeman Committee =

In Israel, the Neeman Committee was established to solve disputes concerning the process of Conversion to Judaism within the borders of Israel, which by the Law of Return also grants automatic citizenship and accompanying rights. It is unrelated to the ongoing debate about which conversions performed outside Israel should be recognized.
