= Citizenship and Entry into Israel Law =

2003 Israeli law

The Citizenship and Entry into Israel Law (Temporary Order) 5763 is an Israeli law first passed on 31 July 2003. The law makes inhabitants of the West Bank and Gaza Strip ineligible for the automatic granting of Israeli citizenship and residency permits that are usually available through marriage to an Israeli citizen (i.e., family reunification). It expired on 6 July 2021, but was reauthorized on 10 March 2022.

== History ==
The law originated in a 2002 Cabinet order freezing the issue of citizenship on family reunification grounds between Israeli citizens and residents of areas governed by the Palestinian National Authority. The law was extended in mid-2005 but limited its scope to those families where the husband is under 35 years of age and the wife is under 25 years old. In the interim the law was tested against Israel's Basic Laws, which operate in a manner similar to a constitution, when the Association for Civil Rights in Israel filed a 2003 petition to have the law struck down. Commenting on the law, Prime Minister Ariel Sharon said: "There's no need to hide behind security arguments. There's a need for the existence of a Jewish state." Then-finance minister Benjamin Netanyahu added: "Instead of making it easier for Palestinians who want to get citizenship, we should make the process much more difficult, in order to guarantee Israel's security and a Jewish majority in Israel."

The law was upheld in a split 6-5 High Court decision rendered in 2006, but the decision criticized a number of aspects of the law. In particular, the minority judgement, written by Chief Justice Aharon Barak, emphasized the temporary nature of the law's effect, arguing that "the appropriate goal of increasing security is not justifying severe harm to many thousands of Israeli citizens."

A draft bill to replace the law rather than seek a second renewal following the expiry of its application in January, 2007, sought to expand the areas targeted by the law beyond Palestinian Authority-controlled areas to include other regions with which Israel is in a state of military conflict.

The law was challenged again in 2007. A number of human rights organisations and public figures petitioned the Supreme Court arguing that the law violates the right to family life and the right to equality of Palestinian citizens of Israel. In 2012, the Court issued its decision rejecting the petitions and confirming the constitutionality of the law. The majority of the Court ruled that there was no violation of the right to family life or the right to equality. They further stated that to the extent that these rights are violated, the violation is considered proportionate and therefore justified according to section 8 of Basic Law: Human Dignity and Freedom. The majority justices explained that the Palestinians in the West Bank and the Gaza Strip are considered to be "enemy nationals". This, for the majority, is considered a relevant distinction that justifies the law.

The outcome and the reasoning of this ruling by the Supreme Court has been criticised because of its negative implications for the constitutional rights of the Palestinian citizens of Israel. The majority justices in this decision treated the rights of the Palestinian citizens of Israel as though they are an immigrant non-citizen group and not a homeland indigenous minority. The Court also discussed the role of demographic considerations and showed inclination to accept restricting the rights of the Palestinian citizens in order to preserve a Jewish majority among the population in Israel. It is argued that the arguments and justifications used by the Supreme Court provide the building blocks for a legal framework that explicitly institutionalises separate hierarchical categories of citizenship.

The law expired on 6 July 2021, after the new coalition government headed by Naftali Bennett failed to muster enough votes for its extension; despite Yamina striking a deal with the coalition parties Ra'am, Labor Party and Meretz to let it pass in return for reducing the extension period to six months, granting A-5 visa to 1,600 Palestinian families, and resolving the issue of 9,700 Palestinians staying in the country from permission by the IDF. The opposition right-wing members from parties like Likud voted against the extension in order to humiliate the government, while the Arab Joint List and rebel Yamina MK Amichai Chikli also voted against it.

After the expiry of the law, the number of applications for residency increased but the Interior Minister Ayelet Shaked instructed the Population, Immigration and Border Authority to continue to act as if the law was still in place. On 11 January 2022, the Supreme Court issued an order instructing the government "to act in accordance with existing law alone" and that "it is no longer authorized to act based on a law, emergency provisions or regulations that were issued pursuant to it as long as this law is not in effect."

The law was later reintroduced in Knesset and passed on 10 March 2022 by a 45–15 vote with the help of opposition lawmakers from Likud and the Religious Zionist Party, after Interior Minister Ayelet Shaked and Religious Zionist Party MK Simcha Rothman drafted a version that would be acceptable to the parties of the coalition government as well as the opposition. Coalition members Meretz and Ra’am voted against it. The new version allows the Interior Ministry to put quotas on permits granted under "exceptional humanitarian cases" and cancel permits of Palestinians for activities against the state like spying or terrorism.

== Debate ==
Those in favor of the law, such as Ze'ev Boim, say it is aimed at preventing terrorist attacks and that "We have to maintain the state's democratic nature, but also its Jewish nature." In the Israeli Supreme Court decision on this matter, Deputy Chief Justice Mishael Cheshin argued that, "Israeli citizens [do not] enjoy a constitutional right to bring a foreign national into Israel ... and it is the right—moreover, it is the duty—of the state, of any state, to protect its residents from those wishing to harm them. And it derives from this that the state is entitled to prevent the immigration of enemy nationals into it—even if they are spouses of Israeli citizens—while it is waging an armed conflict with that same enemy."

Supporters also cite demographic concerns about the family reunification process. According to demographer Arnon Sofer, had the process continued unabated, 200,000 Palestinians would receive Israeli citizenship in the first decade alone, and the number of Palestinians in Israel would rise exponentially due to the law and high population growth. Within sixty years, Jews would be a minority within Israel (not including the West Bank and Gaza Strip), effectively destroying the Jewish character of the state.

Critics argue that the law is discriminatory because it disproportionately affects Israeli Arabs, since Israeli Arabs are far more likely to have spouses from the West Bank and Gaza Strip than other Israeli citizens. Such critics have included the United Nations Committee on the Elimination of Racial Discrimination, which unanimously approved a resolution stating that the Israeli law violated an international human rights treaty against racism; and Amnesty International, which has argued that "[i]n its current form the law is discriminatory and violates fundamental principles of equality, human dignity, personal freedom and privacy, enshrined in the Basic Law: Human Dignity and Liberty, as well as the right of children to live with both parents, and other fundamental rights enshrined in international human rights treaties to which Israel is a party and which it is obliged to uphold." When the law was renewed in June 2008, the publisher of the Israeli daily Ha'aretz argued that its existence makes Israel into an apartheid state.

In January 2012, Arab Knesset member Jamal Zahalka expressed concern that the law would lead to large-scale emigration of Arab Israelis from Israel into Palestinian Authority areas, and claimed that Israel was taking advantage of the Supreme Court's decision to bring about an exodus of Arabs from Israel.

== See also ==
- Amendment No. 28 to the Entry Into Israel Law
- Israeli nationality law
- Visa policy of Israel
- Visa requirements for Israeli citizens
- Israeli passport
- Israeli identity card
- Who is a Jew?
- Relationships between Jewish religious movements
- Law of Return
- Yom HaAliyah
