= Rufeisen v. Minister of the Interior =

Israeli Supreme Court case

The Israeli Supreme Court case Rufeisen v. Minister of the Interior 16 PD 2428 (1962) determined Who is a Jew for the purposes of the Law of Return; specifically, it determined that Oswald Rufeisen, Jewish by birth but a convert to Catholicism, was an apostate and did not qualify as a Jew for the Law of Return.
