= Oswald Rufeisen =

Polish-Jewish Carmelite friar and partisan during World War II

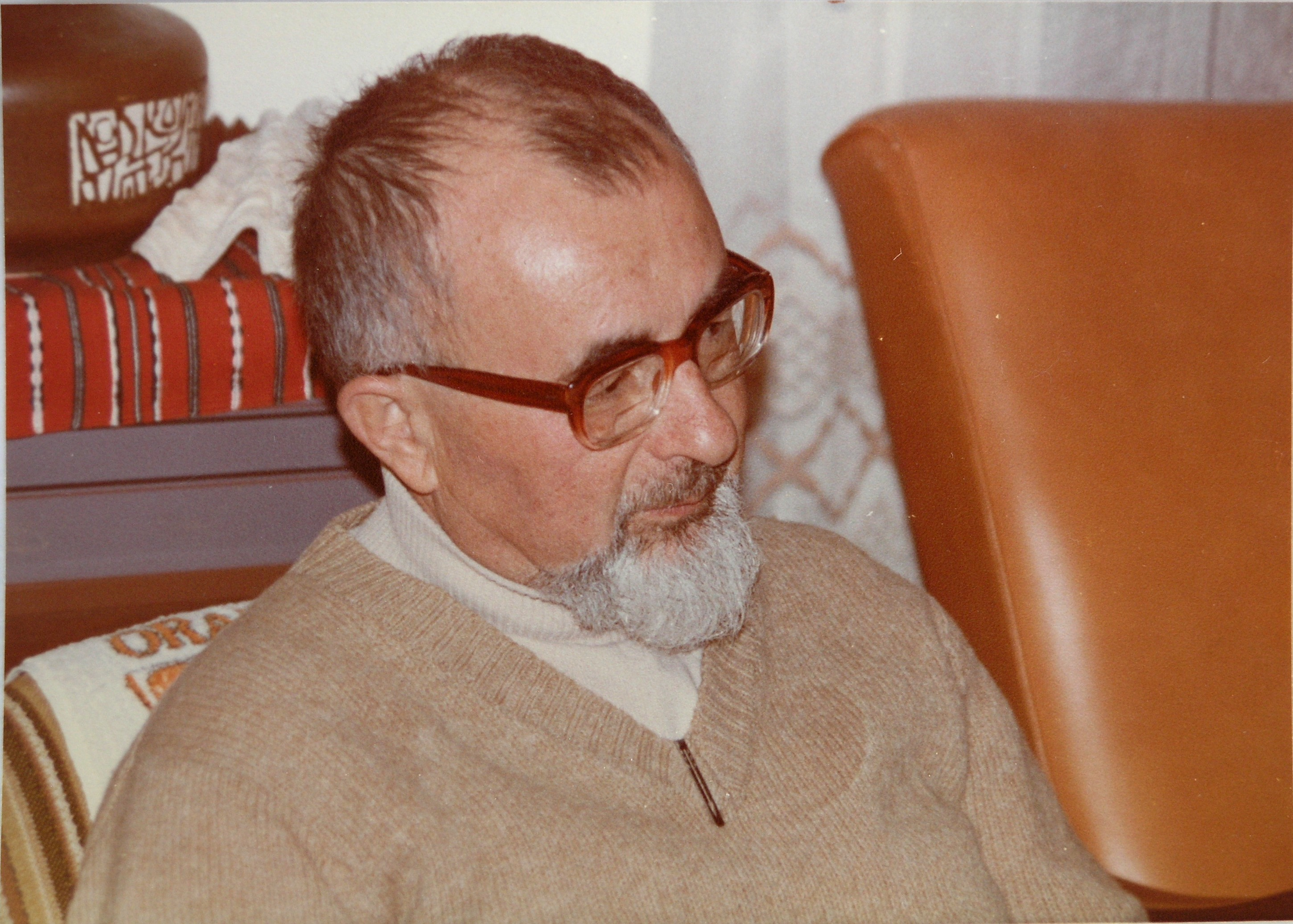
Oswald Rufeisen in 1980

Oswald Rufeisen (religious name Daniel Maria; 1922–1998) was a Polish-born Jew who survived the Nazi Germany invasion of his homeland, in the course of which he converted to Christianity, becoming a Catholic and a friar of the Discalced Carmelites. He sought Israeli citizenship under the Israeli Law of Return, but was refused. However, he moved to Israel as a Carmelite friar, where he spent the rest of his life, and acquired citizenship through naturalization.

== Life ==
Shmuel Oswald Rufeisen was born to a Jewish family in Zadziele near the Polish town of Oświęcim (Poland), in which Germans installed the death camp Auschwitz. During his youth he belonged to Akiva, a Zionist youth movement.

After the German and Soviet invasion of Poland in 1939, which started the Second World War, he flew to Lwów, and then to Vilnius. In 1941 he helped to save hundreds of fellow Jews in the Mir Ghetto (in the city of Mir, Belarus) from mass execution by infiltrating German police station as a translator under the assumed identity as an ethnically German Pole. Around the same time, he led a resistance group within the Mir Ghetto. While in hiding in a Polish convent of the Sisters of the Resurrection, he converted to Christianity and took baptism from the nuns. After the war, he joined the Carmelite Order, became a Discalced Carmelite friar and eventually a Catholic priest.

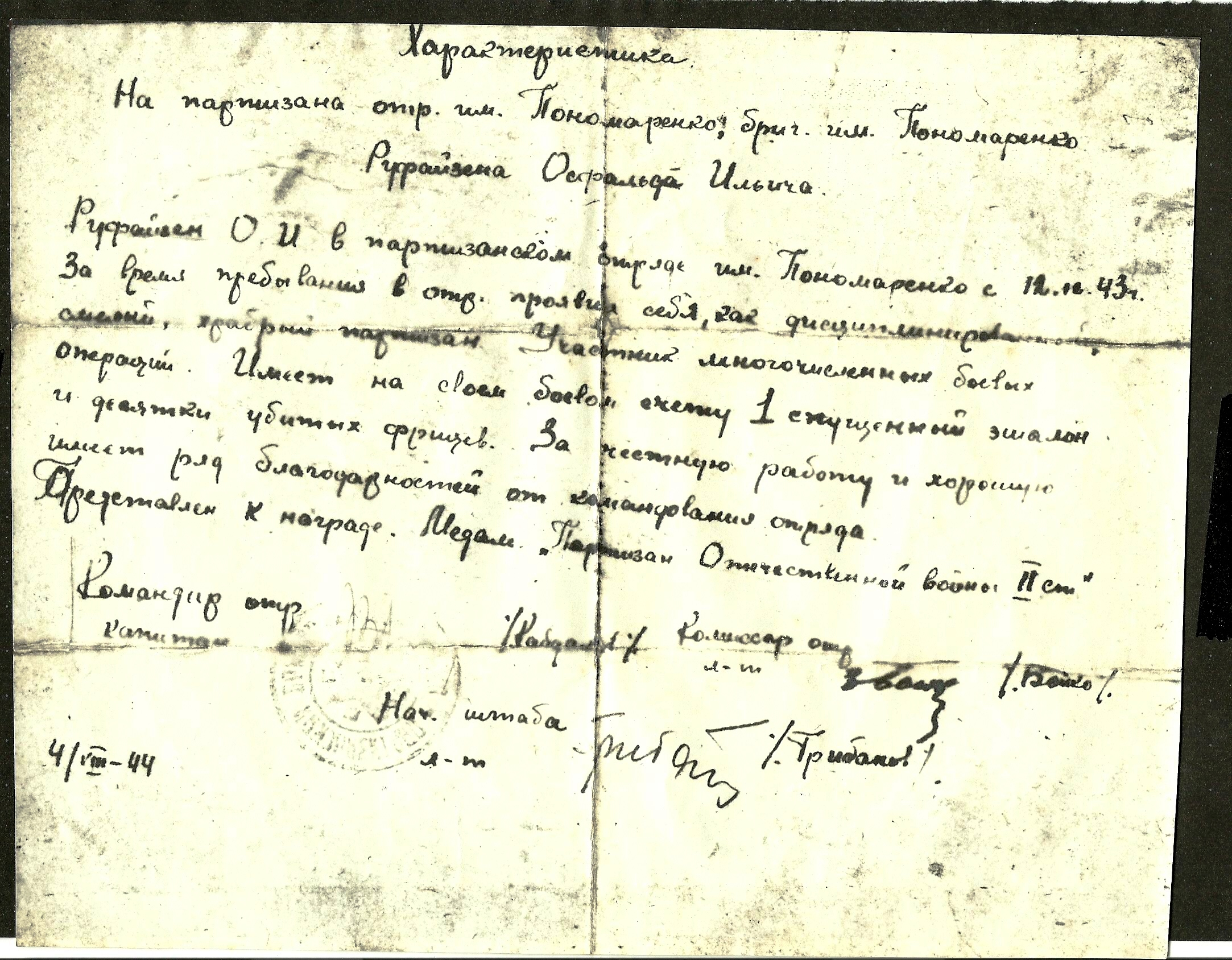
1944 Partisan document issued to Oswald Rufeisen

Throughout the 1950s, Rufeisen made numerous requests to the Carmelite authorities to transfer him to the order's monastery in Haifa, Jerusalem, and to the Polish government to allow him to move to Israel for permanent residence. These were regularly denied until the late 1950s, when the Polish government finally granted his request on the condition that he give up his Polish citizenship. Rufeisen arrived in Israel in July 1959 and reunited with his brother Aryeh, who had come to then Palestine in 1941. Rufeisen, who was initially given only a one-year residence permit in Israel, rendering him virtually stateless, applied for Israeli citizenship under the Law of Return, which entitles Jews to immigrate to Israel. He maintained that although his religion was Catholicism he was still a Jew:

"My ethnic origin is and always will be Jewish. I have no other nationality. If I am not a Jew, what am I? I did not accept Christianity to leave my people. I added it to my Judaism. I feel as a Jew."

Different branches of Judaism treat Jews who convert to other religions differently. In Orthodox and Conservative Judaism converts are still regarded as Jews. Throughout the centuries, the predominant view among rabbis has been that individuals of Jewish heritage continue to be considered Jewish even after conversion to another faith. The same cannot be said for Reform Judaism. On matters of Marriage and Jewish status, the Orthodox Rabbinate has Judicial Authority.

The Israeli government denied Rufeisen's request on the grounds that he had converted to Christianity. Rufeisen appealed the case to the Supreme Court of Israel. His lawyer argued that by denying Rufeisen the right to immigrate Israel would cast itself as a theocracy in which national affiliation is equated with religion. In 1962, the Supreme Court upheld the government's decision: any Jew converting to another religion would forfeit their preferential access to Israeli citizenship (Rufeisen v. Minister of the Interior, (1962) 16 PD 2428). The trial ignited public debate about Jewish identity and the court's decision, according to historian Michael Stanislawski, was a defining moment in the history of the Jewish State, whose influence on Israeli law and public opinion can be felt to this day.

Nevertheless, Rufeisen went on to serve as a Carmelite friar at Stella Maris Monastery in Haifa, Israel, where he spent the rest of his life, and acquired Israeli citizenship through naturalization. He died in Haifa.

== In literature ==
The novel Daniel Stein, Interpreter by renowned Russian writer Lyudmila Ulitskaya was inspired by the life of Oswald Rufeisen.

The character of Jonas Herzog in Robert Stone's novel Damascus Gate is based largely on Oswald Rufeisen.
