= Law of Return =

1950 Israeli law granting Jews the right to immigrate and gain Israeli citizenship

The Law of Return (Hebrew: חוק השבות, romanized: ḥok ha-shvūt) is an Israeli law, initially passed in 1950 and extended in 1970, giving all Jews, persons with at least one Jewish grandparent, and their spouses, legal rights to enter, reside in, and acquire citizenship of, the State of Israel. The 1950 law declared that "every Jew has the right to come to this country as an oleh [immigrant]". The legislature of Israel sought by the law to give effect to a key objective of the Zionist movement in the wake of the Holocaust: to establish Israel as a Jewish state in which all Jews could live. In 1970, the rights of entry, settlement and citizenship were extended: to any person with at least one Jewish grandparent, and to the spouse of any such person, whether or not such persons were considered Jewish under strict (Orthodox) interpretations of Jewish religious law. However, a person who has previously been a Jew but has voluntarily changed their religion is ineligible (this ineligibility rule applies regardless of religious teachings as to whether or not the person remains Jewish in such circumstances).

On the day of arrival in Israel, or occasionally at a later date, persons entering under the law receive a certificate confirming their oleh status. The entrant then has three months to decide whether they wish to become a citizen; they can renounce or pledge to renounce their other citizenship(s) during this time.

Since 2005, the rights under the law have been restricted such that residents of the West Bank and the Gaza Strip are no longer eligible (a consequence of the Citizenship and Entry into Israel Law). The right to an oleh certificate may also be denied if the person has engaged in anti-Jewish activity, poses a threat to public health or security, or has a criminal record and is likely to endanger public welfare in Israel.

== History ==
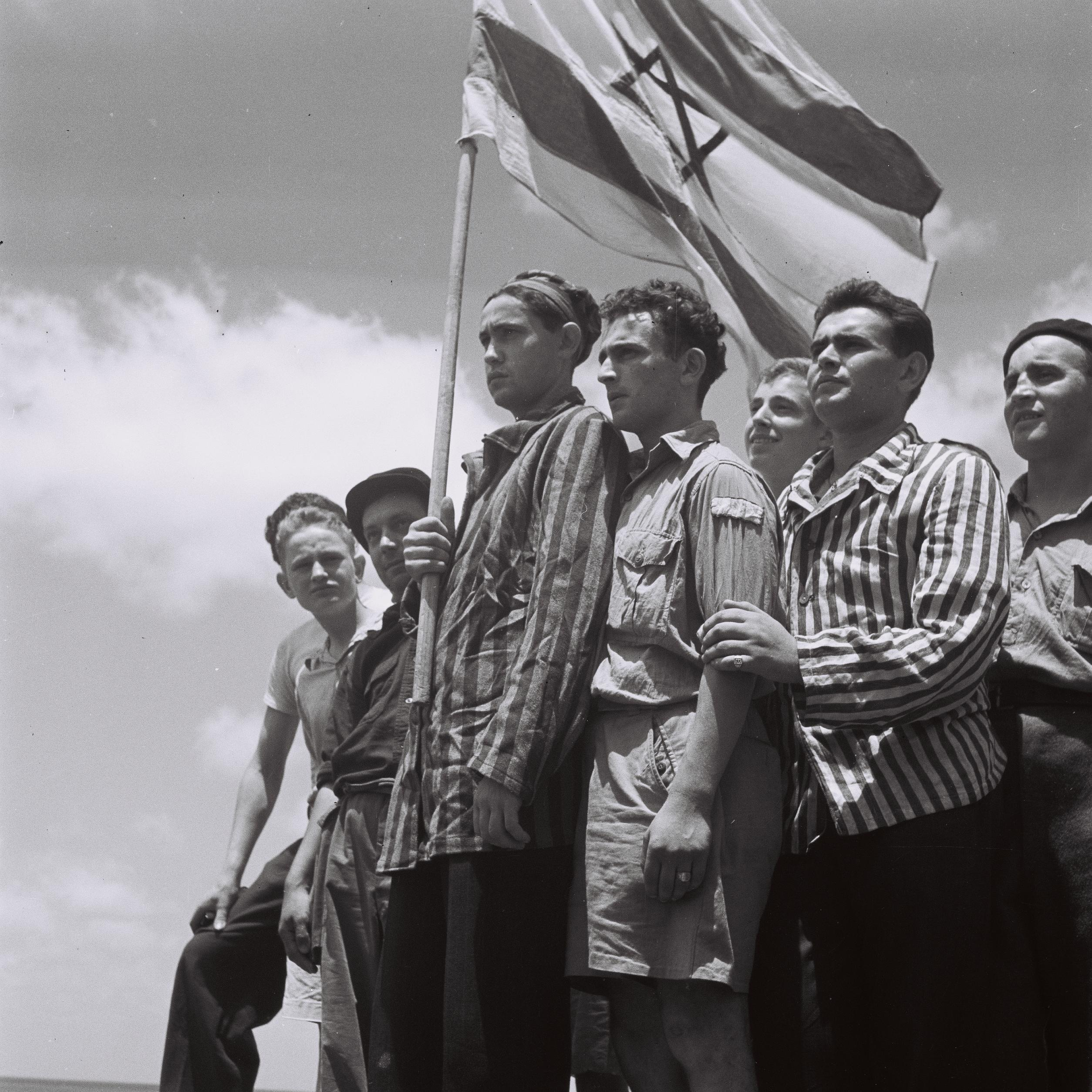
Holocaust survivors arriving in Haifa in 1945, before the passage of the Law of Return

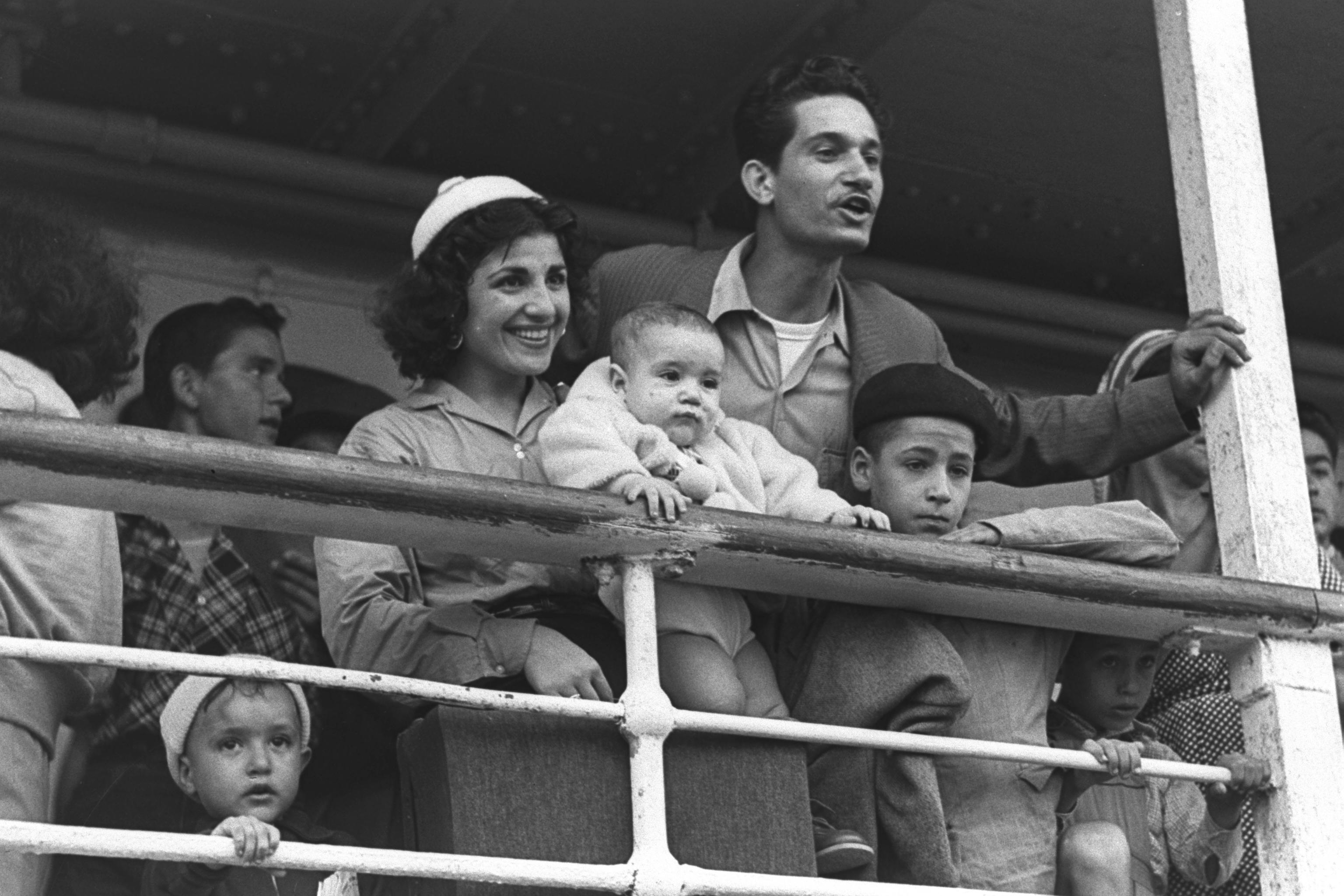
Moroccan Jewish immigrants arriving in Israel under the Law of Return, 1954

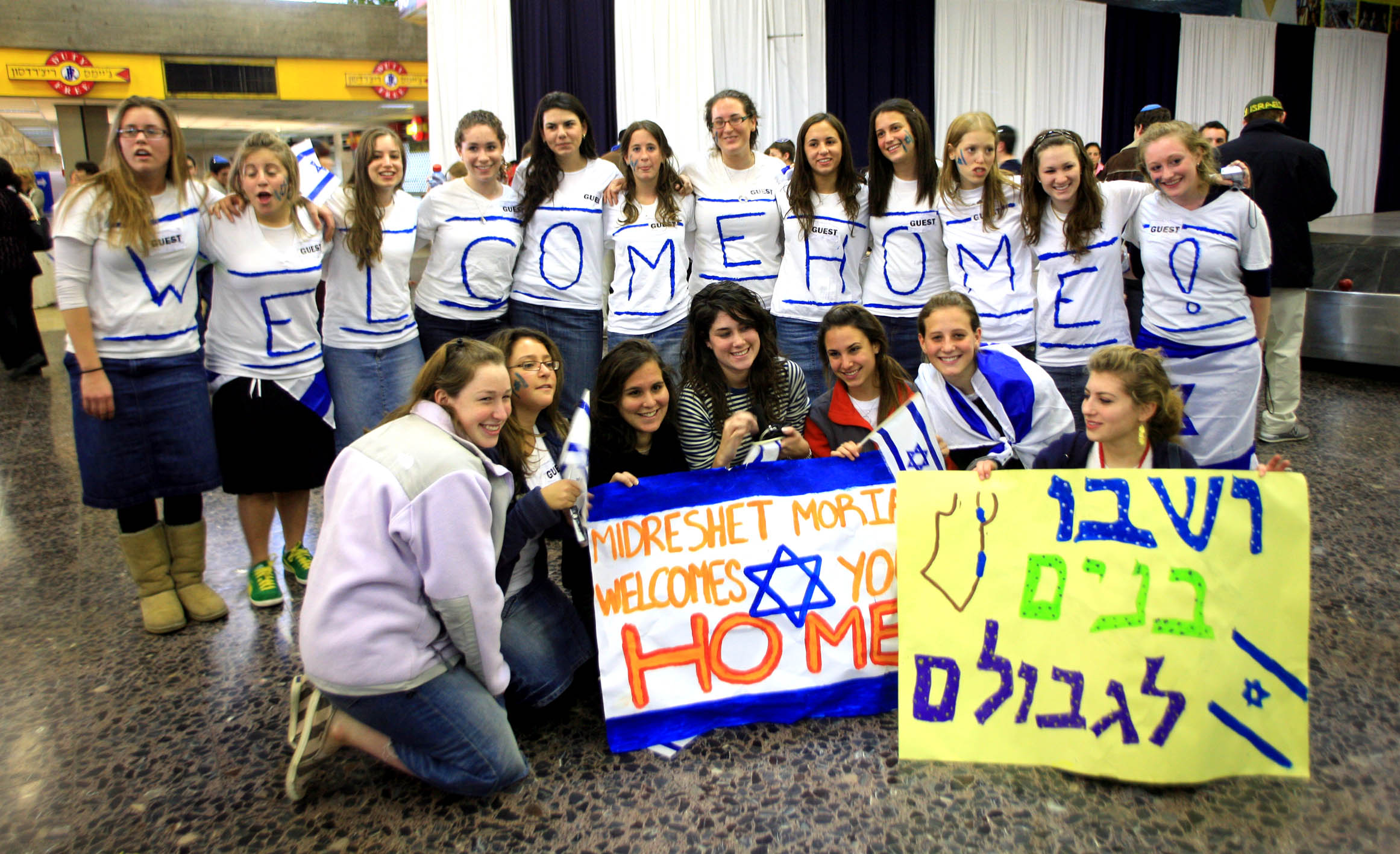
North American immigrants arriving in Israel under the auspices of Nefesh B'Nefesh

The Law of Return was passed unanimously by the Knesset, Israel's Parliament, on 5 July 1950. This date had been chosen to coincide with the anniversary of the death of early political Zionism leader Theodor Herzl. It declared:

Every Jew has the right to come to this country as an oleh.

Israel's first prime minister, David Ben-Gurion, asserted in the Knesset that the law did not bestow a right but rather affirmed an 'inherent right' Jews possessed by virtue of being Jewish:

This law does not provide for the State to bestow the right to settle upon the Jew living abroad; it affirms that this right is inherent in him from the very fact of being a Jew; the State does not grant the right of return to the Jews of the diaspora. This right preceded the State; this right built the State; its source is to be found in the historic and never broken connection between the Jewish people and the homeland.

Follow-up legislation on immigration matters was contained in the Nationality Law of 1952.

Originally, the rights under the Law of Return applied only to Jews. However, due to an inability on the lawmakers to agree on a definition of "who is a Jew", the Law did not define the term, relying instead on the issue to resolve itself over time. As a result, the Law relied in effect on the traditional halakhic definition. But, the absence of a definition of who is a Jew, for the purpose of the Law, resulted in divergent views of the various streams of Judaism competing for recognition.

Those who immigrate to Israel under the Law of Return are immediately entitled to citizenship in Israel. However, differences of opinion have arisen as to whether a person who has claimed citizenship under the Law of Return should then be automatically registered as "Jewish" for census purposes. According to the halakhic definition, a person is Jewish if their mother is Jewish, or if they convert to Judaism. Orthodox Jews do not recognize conversions performed under the rules of Reform or Conservative Judaism. However, the law provides that any Jew, regardless of affiliation, may migrate to Israel and claim citizenship.

=== Jewish ancestry amendment ===
The Law of Return was amended in 1970 to extended the right of return to certain people who might not, until then, have been considered eligible. Amendment number 2, 4a, stated:

The rights of a Jew under this Law and the rights of an oleh under the Nationality Law, 5712-1952***, as well as the rights of an oleh under any other enactment, are also vested in a child and a grandchild of a Jew, the spouse of a Jew, the spouse of a child of a Jew and the spouse of a grandchild of a Jew, except for a person who has been a Jew and has voluntarily changed his/her religion.

The law since 1970 applies to the following groups:

- Those who had been born Jews according to the Orthodox interpretation: namely, those who have a Jewish mother or maternal grandmother.
- Those with recent Jewish ancestry: namely, those who have a Jewish father, grandfather or paternal grandmother.
- Those who have converted to Judaism (Orthodox, Reform, or Conservative denominations—not secular—though Reform and Conservative conversions must take place outside the state, similar to civil marriages).

Jews who have converted to another religion are not eligible to immigrate under the Law of Return, even though they are still Jews according to halakha.

The 1970 amendment was induced by the debate on "who is a Jew?"—until 1970, the law did not refer to the question. There are several explanations as to why the definition under the law became so inclusive. One is that given the persecutory Nuremberg Laws had not used a halakhic definition (their definition was broader), the Law of Return definition ought not be overly restrictive simply to conform to traditional halakhic definitions either. Another explanation is that the State of Israel wished to facilitate further immigration related to a wave of immigrants from Poland, following an antisemitic campaign begun by the government there from 1967, including the immigration of many family members of olim who were not, under strict halakhic definitions, Jewish.

A second explanation is that, in order to generally increase immigration levels so as to offset the perceived "demographic threat" posed by growth of the extant Arab population in Israel, the law expanded the base group of those eligible to immigrate to Israel.

A third explanation promoted by religious Jews is that the overwhelmingly secular leadership in Israel sought to undermine the influence of religious elements in Israeli politics and society by allowing more secular Jews and their non-Jewish spouses to immigrate.

The Israeli Rabbinate is a purely Orthodox body that is far more strict in defining "who is a Jew". This creates a situation in which thousands of immigrants who are eligible for citizenship under the Law of Return's criteria, are ineligible for Jewish marriage by the Israeli Rabbinate.

As of 2021, 3,340,000 Jews have immigrated to Israel since its independence in 1948. Hundreds of thousands of people who do not have Jewish status under Orthodox Jewish interpretations of halakha received Israeli citizenship, as the law confers citizenship to all offspring of a Jew (including grandchildren) and their spouses.

== Denial of citizenship ==
Section 2(b) of the Law of Return empowers the Minister of Interior to deny Israeli citizenship under the Law of Return on a number of grounds: For example, an applicant may be denied citizenship if they are considered a threat to the security of the State of Israel (e.g., treason against the Jewish State), or have a past criminal record involving a serious crime, such as murder, and pose a danger to the well-being of the State of Israel; or, for example, may be a fugitive in another country for any felony (unless they are persecution victims); or such persons who, by virtue of their illness, may pose a serious public health risk to the people of Israel; as also any person who may be actively engaged in any campaign that vociferously speaks out against the Jewish people and undermines their cause (such as demagoguery).

This provision has been used to exclude applicants a handful of times since Israel's establishment. Notable cases include Robert Soblen, an American Communist who spied for the Soviet Union and fled to Israel in an attempt to escape a life sentence; Meyer Lansky, an American mobster who was initially granted entry to Israel but was expelled two years later; and Victor Vancier, an American Kahanist activist convicted of involvement in a series of bombings.

In 1962, the case of Oswald Rufeisen, born a Polish Jew and later a Catholic convert, came before the Israeli Supreme court. The Supreme Court decided that "no one can regard an apostate as belonging to the Jewish people".

In 2024, Leo Franks, a Jewish Briton who was in the process of applying for Israeli citizenship, had his citizenship application closed and his deportation from the country ordered by the Ministry of the Interior. This came after he was arrested at an anti-war protest in Jerusalem and after having been detained twice in the West Bank, once when accompanying Palestinian shepherds and once when "filming settler violence against Palestinians". Franks interpreted his deportation and denial of citizenship as a change to the Law of Return, saying to the Jewish Telegraphic Agency: "the courts have given the Ministry of Interior free rein to make decisions about who can be a Jew in Israel on the basis of his politics". The lead editorial of both the English and Hebrew editions of the Israeli broadsheet Haaretz made the same claim about the political significance of Franks' case, titling the English-language version of the editorial as "Only the Right Jews Can Make Aliyah in Today's Increasingly Undemocratic Israel".

The granting of citizenship under the Law of Return does not prevent a person from being extradited back to another country under an extradition treaty with that other country.

== Same-sex spousal relationships ==
On 10 June 2011, the applicability of the Law of Return to same-sex couples was tested when a gay male couple, one Jewish and one Catholic, made aliyah to Israel. This couple was the first same-sex, different-religion, married couple to request joint aliyah status. (Opposite-sex, different-religion, married couples had hitherto received joint aliyah as a matter of course.) The Jewish man quickly received citizenship but the decision on his husband's new citizenship was delayed by the Ministry of the Interior; this was despite the law's explicit and unqualified statement that the spouse of a Jewish returnee is also to be granted citizenship. However, within two months of the entry, on 10 August 2011, the Ministry of the Interior granted citizenship to the non-Jewish husband as required by the law.

In 2014, Interior Minister Gideon Sa'ar clarified that Jews in same-sex relationships who had been married abroad and wished to immigrate to Israel under the law of return were eligible to do so, with their spouse. This included those with a non-Jewish spouse, consistent with the terms of the law. Both same-sex spouses would, like different-sex couples, receive Israeli citizenship.

== Controversy ==
=== Followers of Messianic Judaism ===
The Supreme Court of Israel ruled, in a 1989 case, that Messianic Judaism constituted another religion, and that people who had become Messianic Jews were not therefore eligible for aliyah under the law, which excepted those Jews who had voluntarily changed their religion.

On 16 April 2008, the Supreme Court heard a further case brought by a number of people with Jewish fathers and grandfathers whose applications for citizenship had been rejected on the grounds that they were Messianic Jews. The argument was made by the applicants that they had never been Jews according to halakha, and were not therefore excluded by the conversion clause. The court upheld this argument in its ruling; and the government agreed to reprocess their applications. Thus, Messianic Jews are considered eligible for return if they can claim Jewish ancestry (eg, through a Jewish father or grandfather).

=== Claims of discrimination in relation to Palestinian refugees ===
Critics claim that the Law of Return runs counter to the claims of a democratic state.

Palestinians and advocates for Palestinian refugee rights criticize the Law of Return, which they compare with the Palestinian claim to a Palestinian right of return. These critics consider the Law, as contrasted against the denial of the right of return, offensive and institutionalized ethnic discrimination.

A report by the UN Economic and Social Commission for Western Asia (ESCWA) criticized the Law of Return for its differential eligibility tests: on the one hand allowing immigrants with a particular ethnoreligious identity or ancestry, while at the same time failing to provide equivalent or similar rights of return to those with other types of connection to the lands of the State of Israel (in particular, those with Palestinian ancestry). It criticized the law for:

"conferring on Jews worldwide the right to enter Israel and obtain Israeli citizenship regardless of their countries of origin and whether or not they can show links to Israel-Palestine, while withholding any comparable right from Palestinians, including those with documented ancestral homes in the country".

It described the policy as one component of a strategy of "demographic engineering" meant primarily to maintain Israel's status as a "Jewish state" by bolstering the number of those within the country identifying as Jewish. The report was later withdrawn following controversy.

== Support for the Law of Return ==
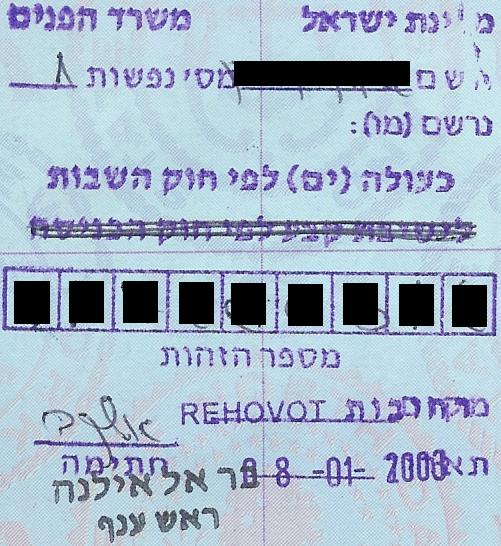
A stamp in a passport issuing holder Israeli citizenship based on Law of Return

Supporters of the law say that it is very similar to those in many European states, which also employ an ethnic component.

Supporters argue that:

1. The Law of Return is not the only way of acquiring citizenship. For example, non-Jews can become citizens by naturalization, residence, or marrying an Israeli citizen. Naturalization, for instance, is available under certain circumstances for the non-Jewish parents of a citizen who has completed their army service.
2. The right granted to Jews along with their relatives under the Law does not necessarily or automatically discriminate against non-Jews, but is a form of "positive" discrimination. Israel has residency and citizenship laws for non-Jews that are equivalent to those in other liberal democracies. Committee for Accuracy in Middle East Reporting in America (CAMERA) argues that the Law of Return is consistent with Convention on the Elimination of All Forms of Racial Discrimination Article I(3), which CAMERA says allows for preferential immigration treatment of some groups without discrimination against a particular group. Thus, CAMERA and others argue that other countries, including Germany, provide immigration privileges to individuals with ethnic ties to these countries (See Right of return and Repatriation laws).
3. While the purpose of the Law of Return is perhaps to keep Israel predominantly Jewish, an argument states that a world where Jews have been persecuted, the concept of maintaining a Jewish state is necessary for the survival of the Jewish people generally and to provide a safe haven for Jewish refugees in specific cases. CAMERA argues the Law of Return is justified under the Convention on the Elimination of All Forms of Racial Discrimination Article I(4), which CAMERA argues allows for affirmative action, because of the discrimination Jews faced during the Holocaust.
4. Benjamin Pogrund, director of Yakar's Center for Social Concern in Jerusalem and member of the Israeli delegation to the United Nations World Conference against Racism, calls the law "unfair" from the Palestinian refugees' point of view, but sees the unfairness as having happened in other places too. Pogrund compares the flight/expulsion of Palestinians (both in 1948 and 1967) to Germany, Poland, the Czech Republic, India and Pakistan.

== Debate in Israel ==
Among Israeli Jews, continued Jewish immigration enjoys strong support. According to a 2016 poll conducted by Pew Forum, 98% of all Jewish Israelis wanted the law to continue to allow Jewish immigration. However, some argue that the law permits the entry of too many non-Jews, undermining its purpose.

Support for the law among Israeli Arabs is much less. According to a poll overseen by Haifa University sociologist Sammy Smooha among 700 Jews and 700 Arabs conducted in 2017 only 25.2% "accepted" the Law of Return, down from 39% in 2015.

In September 2007, the discovery of a violent Israeli Neo-Nazi cell (Patrol 36) in Petah Tikva, made up of teenage immigrants from the former Soviet Union, led to renewed calls amongst politicians to amend the Law of Return. Effi Eitam of the National Religious Party and the National Union, which represent the religious Zionist movement and have previously attempted to advance bills to amend the Law of Return, stated that Israel has become "a haven for people who hate Israel, hate Jews, and exploit the Law of Return to act on this hatred." On the other end of the political spectrum, MK Ahmed Tibi of United Arab List and Ta'al criticized the system's double standard, stating that "people immigrated to Israel and received automatic citizenship under the Law of Return, while citizens of Nazareth and Tayibe are not allowed to visit their own relatives merely due to the fact that they are Arabs."

Thirty-seven percent of Israelis polled said that deeper background checks on new immigrants would amount to racism against Jews from Russian-speaking countries.

On 28 September 2026, two Jewish activists had their aliyah approval revoked for protecting Palestinian communities from further settler violence. The incident led the Population Authority to review process of eligibility under Entry of Israel Law.

== Applicability of the law ==
Amongst those who are in favor of retaining the Law, controversy exists over its wording. The Law's definition of a "Jew" and "Jewish people" are subject to debate. Israeli and Diaspora Jews differ with each other as groups and among themselves as to what this definition should be for the purposes of the Law of Return. Additionally, there is a lively debate over the meaning of the terms "Jewish State" and "State of the Jews".

It is not only the Knesset, however, which has been repeatedly obliged to directly or indirectly address these issues. Over the years, many of Israel's interior ministers have examined the issue of the Law of Return and wavered as to how to apply it. The judiciary has also been called upon to express an opinion on matters relating to the Law. This burning and recurrent question in the country's political dialogue not only reveals but also exacerbates differences of opinion between Israelis.

One central issue is who has the authority over determining the validity of conversions to Judaism for purposes of immigration and citizenship. For historical reasons, the Chief Rabbinate of Israel, under the Israeli Ministry of Religious Affairs, made this determination, but this arrangement is in question. This practice has met opposition among non-Orthodox religious leaders both within Israel and in the diaspora. Several attempts have been made to resolve the issue, the most recent being the Ne'eman Commission, but an impasse persists.

On March 31, 2005, the Israeli Supreme Court ruled 7–4 that all conversions performed outside of Israel would be recognized by the authorities under the Law of Return, notwithstanding the Ne'eman Commission's view that a single body should determine eligibility for immigration. The court had already ruled in 1989 that conversions performed outside of Israel were valid for the Law of Return (regardless of whether they were Orthodox, Conservative, or Reform). The 2005 ruling extended this, finding that overseas conversions were still valid even if the individuals did the preparatory work for the conversions while residing in Israel.

== See also ==
- Basic Laws of Israel
- Prevention of Infiltration Law
- Citizenship and Entry into Israel Law
- Israeli identity card
- Israeli passport
- Politics of Israel
- Oswald Rufeisen (Brother Daniel)
- Yerida - Emigration from Israel
