= Kipryian Kandratovich =

Belarusian military commander

Kipryian Antonovich Kandratovich
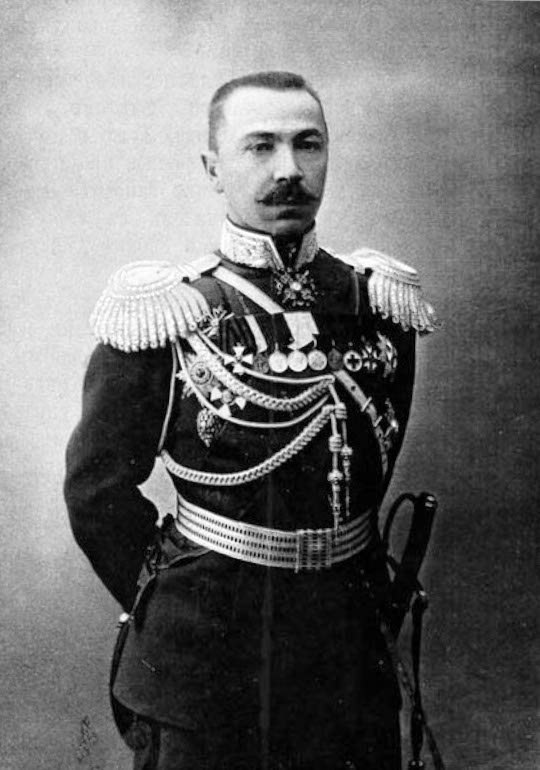
- Born: April 29, 1859; Zinovichy, Vilna Governorate, Russian Empire
- Died: October 31, 1932 (aged 73) Paharodna, Second Polish Republic
- Allegiance: Russian Empire; Lithuania; Belarusian People's Republic
- Branch: Imperial Russian Army
- Commands: 2nd Army Corps; 1st Caucasus Army Corps; 23rd Army Corps
- Conflicts: Russo-Turkish War; Boxer Rebellion; Russo-Japanese War; World War I; Battle of Tannenberg; Russian Civil War
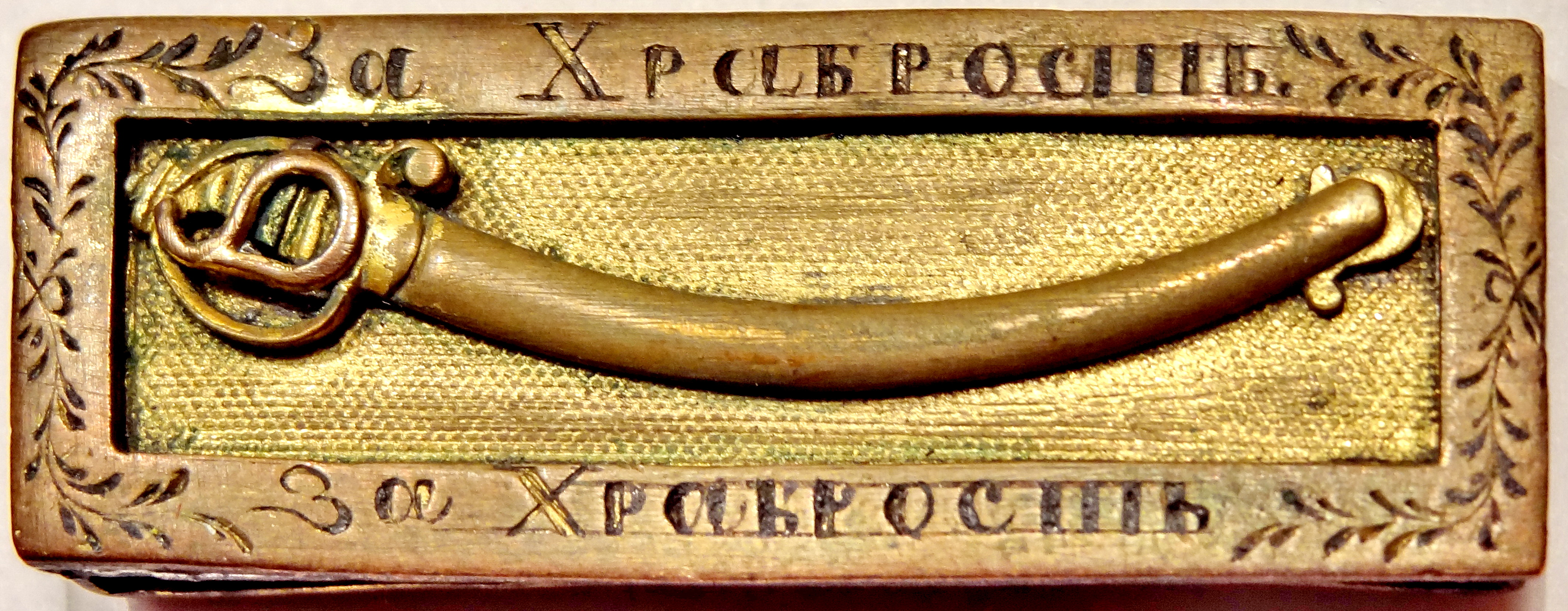
- Awards

Kipryian Antonovich Kandratovich (Belarusian: Кіпрыян Кандратовіч, Kipryjan Kandratovič, Lithuanian: Kiprijanas Kondratavičius), (April 29, 1859 – October 31, 1932) was an Imperial Russian corps commander and the appointed commander of the armed forces of the short-lived Belarusian Democratic Republic.

Born in what is now Belarus, he joined the military in 1875 and served in the Russo-Turkish War (1877–1878). He graduated from the General Staff Academy in 1884. He participated in the suppression of the Boxer Rebellion and protection of the Chinese Eastern Railway in northern China. At the start of the Russo-Japanese War, Kondratovich was tasked with the formation of the 9th East Siberian Brigade. He saw action in the Battle of Te-li-Ssu and Battle of Liaoyang, suffered a severe chest injury, and was promoted to lieutenant general. He served in Russian Turkestan and Caucasus Viceroyalty in 1907–1913. In December 1910, at the age of 51, he was promoted to general of the infantry becoming the youngest full general in the Russian Empire. In August 1913, Kandratovich was appointed commander of the 23rd Army Corps that participated in the Russian invasion of East Prussia and was nearly destroyed in the Battle of Tannenberg. After this defeat, Kandratovich was dismissed from the command and demoted to the reserve ranks. He inspected military units and briefly commanded the 75th Infantry Division in 1917.

In October 1918, Kandratovich worked to organize Belarusian military units that were approved by the Russian Provisional Government. He joined the Rada of the Belarusian Democratic Republic in April 1918 and became the Minister of the Interior in the government of Raman Skirmunt. After the German surrender in November 1918, Kandratovich worked on organizing military units to defend against the Soviet westward offensive. As the Red Army pushed forward, he evacuated to Vilnius where he briefly joined the Lithuanian government of Augustinas Voldemaras before retreating further to Hrodna in December 1918. In 1919–1920, he represented Belarus at the Paris Peace Conference. He lived a few years in Paris before retiring to his estate in Paharodna near Voranava where he died in 1932.

== Biography ==
=== Education ===
Kandratovich was born in the Lidsky Uyezd to a family of local nobles in 1859. According to a family legend, he was, in fact, an illegitimate son of Yuri from the princely Trubetskoy family. Kandratovich attended the Lida County Noble School. He joined the military service in May 1875 in the 105th Orenburg Infantry Regiment and enrolled into the Konstantinovsky Military School in St. Petersburg. He graduated in April 1878 and was sent to serve in the Russo-Turkish War (1877–1878). In 1884, he graduated from the General Staff Academy as a captain. He wrote his thesis on the Siege of Plevna. He later contributed articles on military topics to Moskovskiye Vedomosti until 1900.

=== Service in Asia ===
From November 1884 to April 1888, he served as an officer for special assignments at the headquarters of the Grenadier Corps when he was reassigned to the headquarters of the Moscow Military District. In 1893, he was promoted to colonel. In November 1897, he was reassigned as the Chief of Staff of the 2nd Grenadier Division. In 1900, he participated in the suppression of the Boxer Rebellion and protection of the Chinese Eastern Railway in northern China and was promoted to major general for his actions. In February 1901, he became commander of the 2nd Brigade of the 36th Infantry Division, but returned to China and served in the Kwantung Leased Territory and Viceroyalty of the Far East until January 1904.

At the start of the Russo-Japanese War, Kondratovich was tasked with the formation of the 9th East Siberian Brigade. The brigade was formed in February 1904 and became part of the 1st East Siberian Corps. In summer 1904, the 9th Brigade was replenished with new battalions and became the 9th East Siberian Division. The division suffered a defeat at the Battle of Te-li-Ssu. For his actions in the Battle of Liaoyang, Kondratovich was awarded the Order of Saint George (4th degree). He was also promoted to lieutenant general. In January 1905, he was severely wounded in the chest in the Battle of Sandepu.

He was the Chief of Staff of the 9th East Siberian Division from March 1905 to July 1906. He then briefly served in the General Staff of the Imperial Russian Army and commanded the 2nd Army Corps headquartered in Grodno, before returning to Asia. In January 1907, he became assistant to the Governor-General of Turkestan Alexander Samsonov and Chief of Staff of the Semirechye Cossacks Army. This was more of an administrative role, and Kandratovich dealt with suppression of the revolutionaries (remnants of the Russian Revolution of 1905) and a peasant revolt near Bishkek. In January 1910, he was reassigned as assistant to Governor-General of Tiflis Illarion Vorontsov-Dashkov and commander of the 1st Caucasus Army Corps. In December 1910, he was promoted to general of the infantry, the highest military rank of the Russian Empire in peacetime. In 1913, when there were 177 full generals in the Russian Empire, Kandratovich (at the age of 54) was the youngest among them.

=== World War I ===
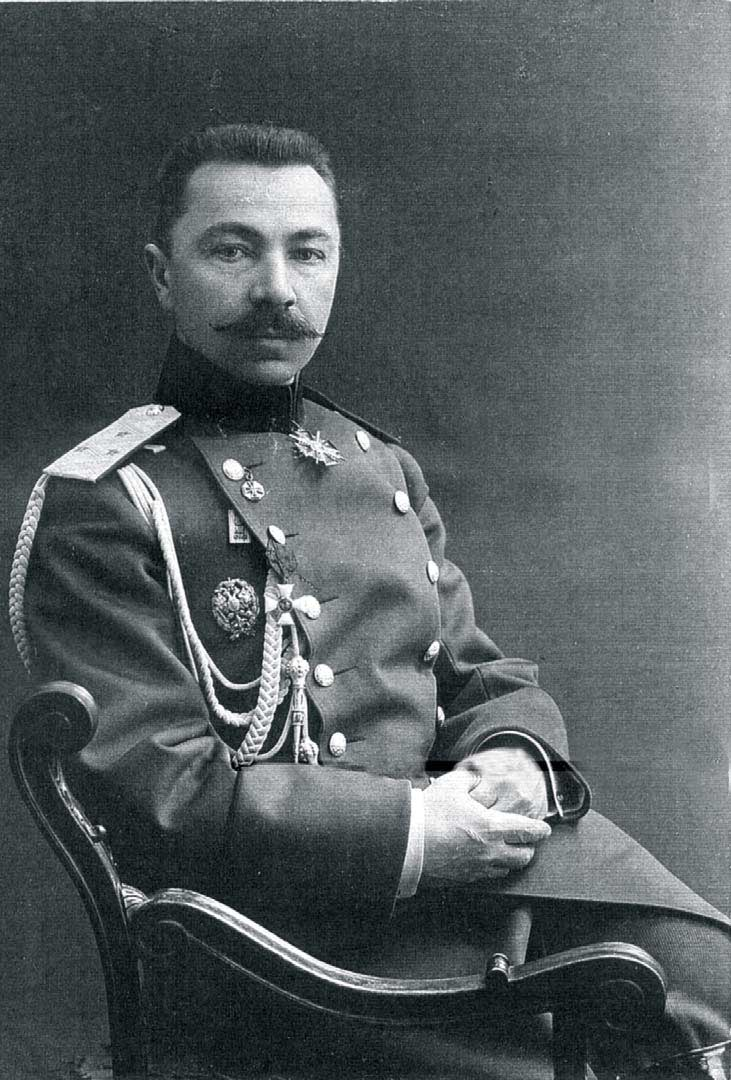
Kandratovich in c. 1908

In August 1913, Kandratovich was appointed commander of the 23rd Army Corps. It was part of the 2nd Army which was commanded by his old boss Alexander Samsonov. During the Russian invasion of East Prussia, the 2nd Army was essentially destroyed in the Battle of Tannenberg and Kandratovich was dismissed from the command and demoted to the reserve ranks at the headquarters of the Minsk Military District on 30 August 1914. Between February and November 1915, he was dismissed from active military duty. After the Great Retreat, Kandratovich returned to active duty and for some time inspected troops and visited the trenches on behalf of the commander of the Western Front. For his diligent services, he was awarded the Order of Saint Alexander Nevsky in June 1916. In May 1917, after the February Revolution, he was given the command of the 75th Infantry Division stationed in Belarus. According to the memoirs of general Vladimir Dzhunkovsky, in June–September 1917, Kandratovich was also an interim commander of the 3rd Siberian Army Corps stationed in Mir. These units were demoralized and soldiers were increasingly disobedient.

=== Belarusian independence ===
To stabilize the army, the Russian Provisional Government began reforming the army on a national-territorial basis in October 1917. In response, the Congress of the Belarusian Soldiers of the Western Front took place in Minsk on October 18–21. The congress elected the Central Belarusian Military Council which began organizing Belarusian military units under the command of Kandratovich. His assistants were general Iosif Pozharsky and lieutenant Kastuś Jezavitaŭ. They received permission from the Russian commander-in-chief Nikolay Dukhonin to organize the Belarusian Corps by absorbing and reorganizing several existing Russian units. However, the Provisional Government was toppled by the Bolsheviks in the October Revolution. In his memoirs, Jezavitaŭ claimed that instead of taking initiative, Kandratovich was passive and awaiting a political decision from the top. As a result, the Central Belarusian Military Council dismissed Kandratovich and replaced him with Jezavitaŭ. Makar Kraŭcoŭ wrote that he was dismissed because he was a "bourgeois". The new Bolshevik government and the new commander-in-chief Nikolai Krylenko ordered the liquidation of the Belarusian units. Men who signed up for the 1st Belarusian Regiment were ordered to report to the 289th Reserve Infantry Regiment, and members of the Central Belarusian Military Council were arrested on the night of January 31 to February 1, 1918.

Together with Raman Skirmunt and Vincent Hadleŭski, and other right-wing activists, Kandratovich organized the Minsk Belarusian Representation in February 1918. They were coopted into the Rada of the Belarusian Democratic Republic in April 1918. Members of the Minsk Belarusian Representation sought to align Belarus with the German Empire which caused a crisis within the Rada and the government of the Belarusian Democratic Republic. As a result, a new Council of Ministers headed by Raman Skirmunt was organized in May 1918 in which Kandratovich became the Minister of the Interior. Skirmunt's government lasted until July 22, 1918. In November 1918, the Rada decided to establish the Belarusian Army and assigned the task to Kandratovich and Jezavitaŭ. Kandratovich prepared a project for a 20,000-men army, but it was rejected as too expensive and unrealistic. According to memoirs of Władysław Wejtko, Ober Ost officials and Kandratovich attempted to organize an international self-defence force against the Soviet westward offensive, but Poles refused to join the project (see also Self-Defence of Lithuania and Belarus).

=== In Lithuania and France ===
At the end of November 1918, as the Red Army pushed into Belarus, many activists and Belarusian soldiers, including Kandratovich, retreated to Vilnius. There, he established contacts with the Council of Lithuania and Prime Minister Augustinas Voldemaras. The Lithuanian Army was just beginning to form and Kandratovich was appointed Deputy Minister of National Defense of Lithuania (effectively, commander of the Lithuanian Army) on November 24. However, Lithuanian officers distrusted him as he preferred Russian or Belarusian officers and conducted himself independently without proper approvals (for example, it is claimed that he employed personal military intelligence officers). He was ineffective in organizing the defence against the invading Bolsheviks (see also Lithuanian–Soviet War). Lithuanian officers officially declared no confidence in Kandratovich on December 20 and he was dismissed from the government on December 22. He retreated to Grodno on December 27, 1918, while the Lithuanian government retreated to Kaunas on January 1, 1919. He supported organization of the 1st Belarusian Regiment in Grodno.

In January 1919, Kandratovich was a member of the delegation sent to represent Belarus at the Paris Peace Conference by Anton Luckievich. However, due to delays in getting visas, the delegation was stuck in Berlin for three months. During that time, Kandratovich worked together with Anton Boryk, the first official envoy of the Belarusian Democratic Republic in Germany, to help the Belarusian prisoners of war in Germany. The Belarusian government hoped to recruit some of the 60,000 Belarusian prisoners in German camps into military units that could later form the core of the national army. In Paris, the delegation worked to obtain international recognition for the Belarusian Democratic Republic and assistance (money and munitions) for the army. However, the work was hampered by lack of resources and internal disagreements. Eugene Ladnov, Minister of Foreign Affairs, accused Kandratovich of putting personal interests ahead, e.g. trying to establish trade between Spain and Russia or trying to protect his estates in Belarus, and wanted him removed from the delegation. In May 1920, Ladnov further accused Kandratovich and other "Russian monarchists" of keeping contacts and conspiring with German monarchists. At the same time, Ladnov informed foreign diplomats about the removal of Kandratovich from the Belarusian delegation (even though Ladnov had a telegram from Luckievich dismissing Kandratovich since February 1920).

=== Later life ===
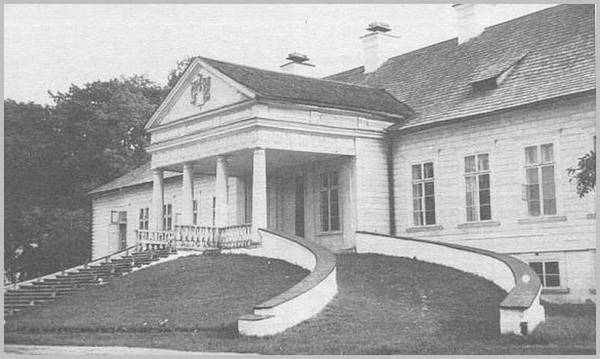
Manor house in Paharodna

Kandratovich stayed in Paris for a few years. He continued to be involved in Belarusian affairs. He helped transition the archives and property of the Belarusian delegation after Ladnov was expelled from the Belarusian government when it was revealed that he was employed by the General Staff of the Polish Army in May 1921. Kandratovich also contributed articles to Bielaruski sciah published by the government of the Belarusian Democratic Republic.

Sometime after 1924, Kandratovich returned to his estate in Paharodna near Voranava (then part of the Second Republic of Poland) and lived there until he died in 1932. He purchased the manor house and about 500 hectares (1,200 acres) of land and forests before World War I. It was a small part of the larger estate developed by Ludwik Skumin Tyszkiewicz (1748–1808). The wooden manor house was plain from the outside but richly decorated inside. Skumin Tyszkiewicz, the husband of the king's niece, built the manor in hopes that King Stanisław August Poniatowski would come to visit.

In 1910, Kandratovich married much younger Ada Richter (1879 (?) – 1954), daughter of general Guido Richter. Their only daughter Vera was born in 1912. At their estate, the family was visited by Richter's relatives from Poland, France, Spain.

After a serious illness that confined him to a wheelchair, Kandratovich died on October 31, 1932. He was buried in the same uniform in which he was wounded in 1905 in the Lida Orthodox cemetery. Kandratovich was reburied twice – in the new cemetery in Voranava in August 1998 and near the in Voranava in May 2000.

== Awards ==
Kandratovich received the following military awards from the Russian Empire:

- Order of Saint Stanislaus (3rd class in 1885, 2nd class in 1896, 1st class in 1904)
- Order of Saint Anna (3rd class in 1891, 2nd class in 1899, 1st class in 1905)
- Order of Saint Vladimir (3rd class in 1902, 2nd class on July 3, 1909)
- Gold Sword for Bravery (March 7, 1906)
- Order of Saint George (4th degree on July 17, 1906)
- Order of the White Eagle (December 6, 1912)
- Order of Saint Alexander Nevsky (June 1, 1916)
