= Order of Saint Alexander Nevsky =

Order of chivalry in the Russian Empire

Imperial Order of Saint Alexander Nevsky
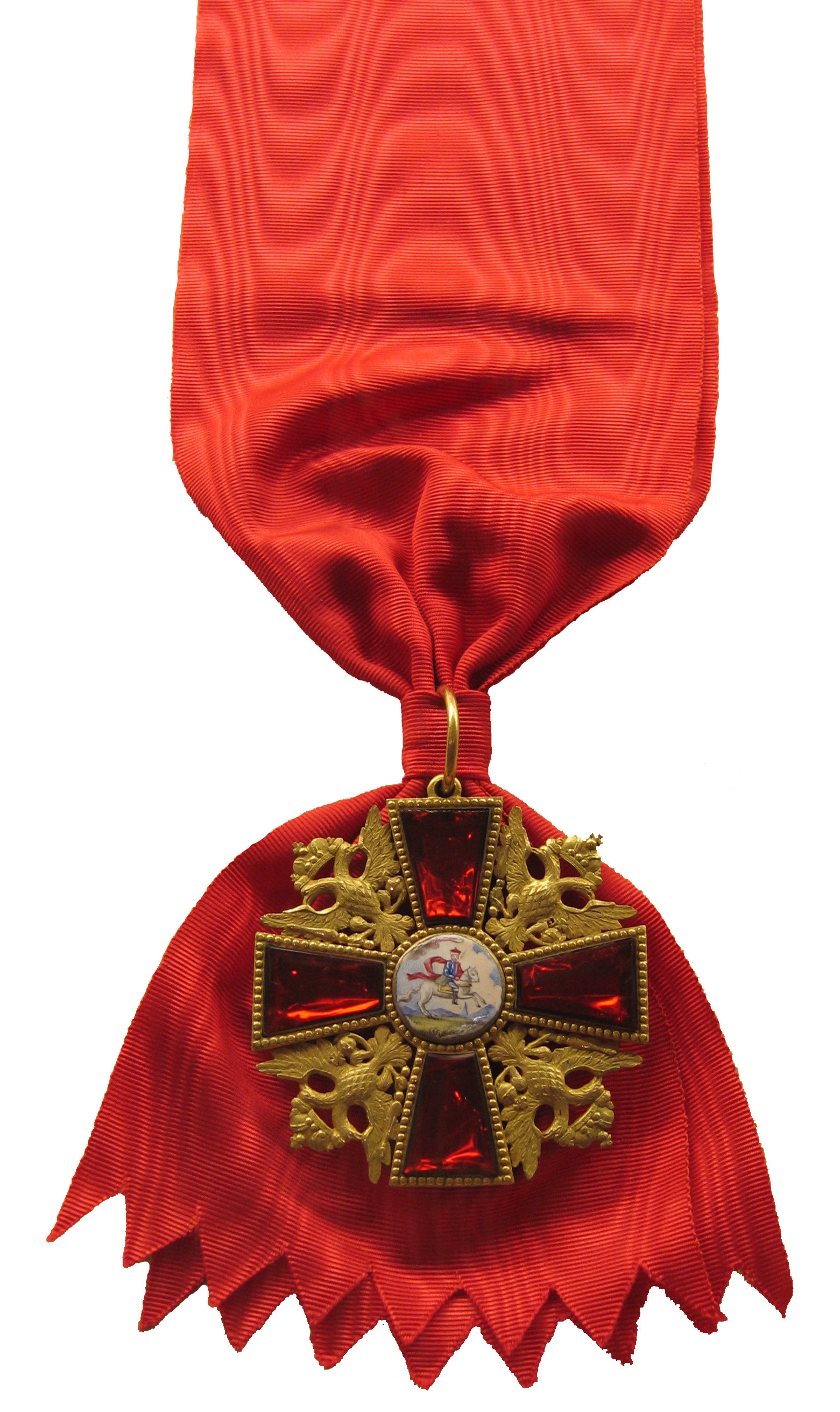
- Order on ribbon

Awarded by Head of the House of Romanov
- Type: Dynastic Order
- Royal house: House of Romanov
- Religious affiliation: Russian Orthodox
- Motto: "For Labor and the Fatherland"
- Awarded for: Military and Civil Merit
- Grades: Awarded in one class

Precedence
- Next (higher): Imperial Order of Saint Andrew
- Next (lower): Imperial Order of the White Eagle
- Equivalent: Imperial Order of Saint Catherine
- Ribbon of the order

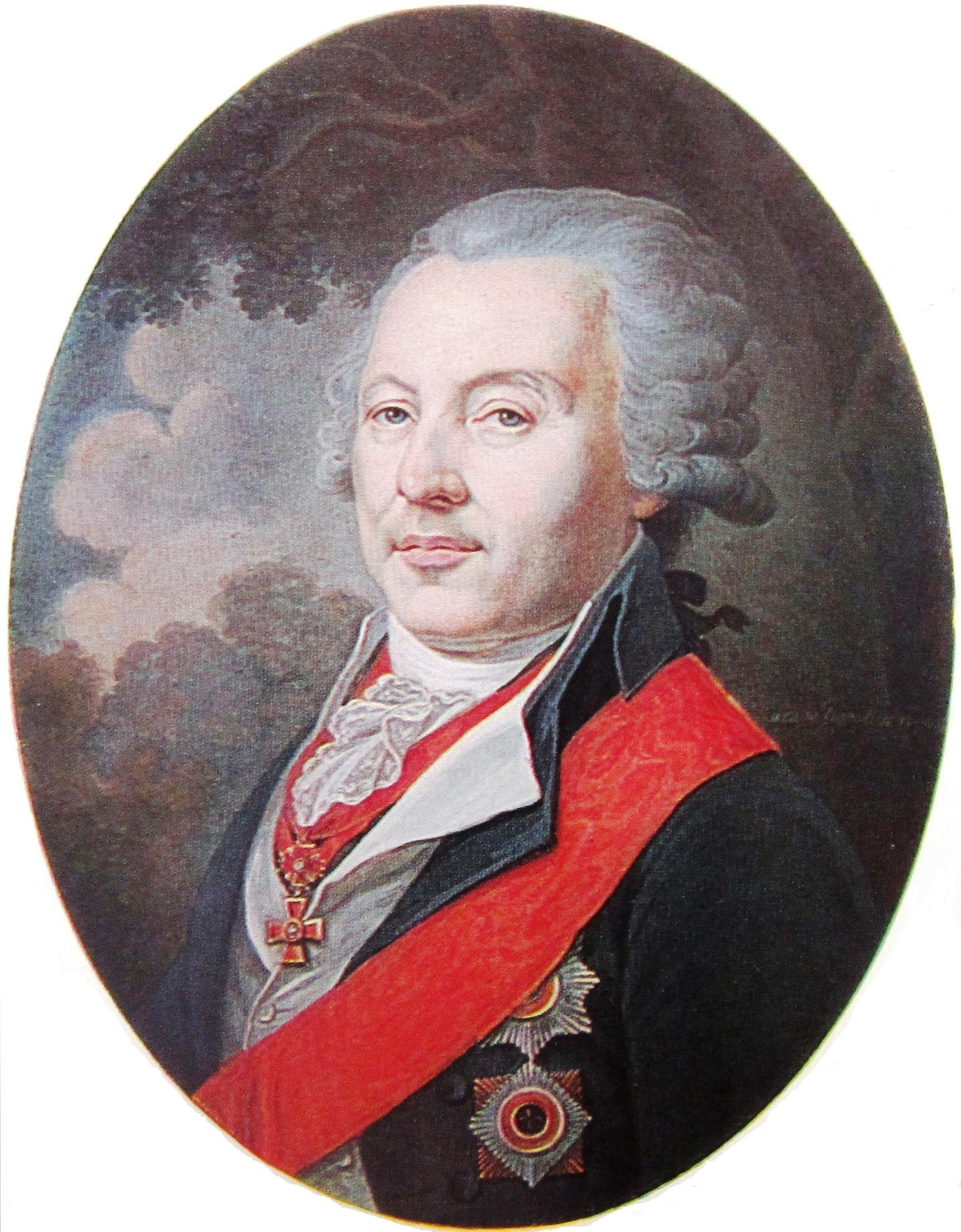
Portrait of the first Russian Minister of Finance, Alexei Vasiliyev, wearing the sash and badge of the Order of Saint Alexander Nevsky

The Imperial Order of Saint Alexander Nevsky was an order of chivalry of the Russian Empire first awarded on 1 June [O.S. 21 May] 1725 by Empress Catherine I of Russia.

== History ==
The introduction of the Imperial Order of Saint Alexander Nevsky was envisioned by Emperor Peter I of Russia (r. 1682–1725) to reward military bravery in battle. However, he died before he could create the order. It was established by Empress Catherine I of Russia, in memory of the deeds of Saint Alexander Nevsky, patron Saint of the Russian capital of Saint Petersburg, for defending Russia against foreign invaders. The order was originally awarded to distinguished Russian citizens who had served their country with honor, mostly through political or military service.

It was first awarded on the occasion of the wedding of Grand Duchess Anna Petrovna of Russia and Charles Frederick, Duke of Holstein-Gottorp in 1725. A dozen guests received the reward, and the order quickly fell far behind the Order of Saint Andrew and the Order of Saint Catherine in prestige.

The Empress Catherine complained about the situation and by September 1725, she took it upon herself to determine who would receive the award. The Order of Saint Alexander was granted the highest esteem and was not usually bestowed upon people below the rank of Lieutenant-General or an equal political status. It also granted hereditary nobility. Additionally it was given to foreign nobles, including Polish King Augustus II the Strong and King Frederick IV of Denmark–Norway

== Legacy ==
The Order of Saint Alexander Nevsky was abolished after the 1917 Russian Revolution, along with all other orders and titles of the Russian Empire.

In 1942, the Soviet Union revived the order as a purely military decoration and renamed it the more secular Order of Alexander Nevsky, and the Russian Federation revived it in 2010.

The heads of the Russian Imperial House in exile have continued to award the Order of St. Alexander Nevsky. Grand Duchess Maria Vladimirovna, a pretender to the Russian throne and to the headship of the Russian Imperial House, continues to award a Russian Imperial Order of Saint Alexander Nevsky as a dynastic order of knighthood. These actions are disputed by some members of the Romanov family.

In 2010, researchers in Saint Petersburg and Moscow published a book listing all the names of the recipients of the original order. The combined number of honorees spanning the years 1725 to 1917 totaled 3,674.

== Insignia Order St Alexander Nevsky ==
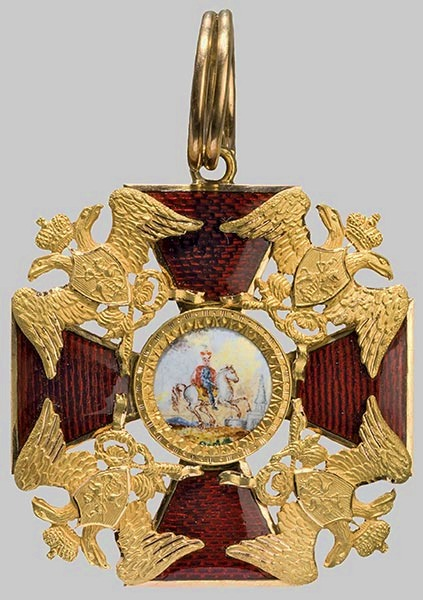
Cross version, edition 1820–1830 (front)

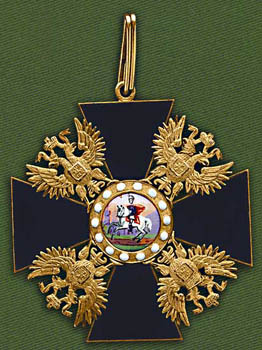
version issued in 1865 in gold on black enamel

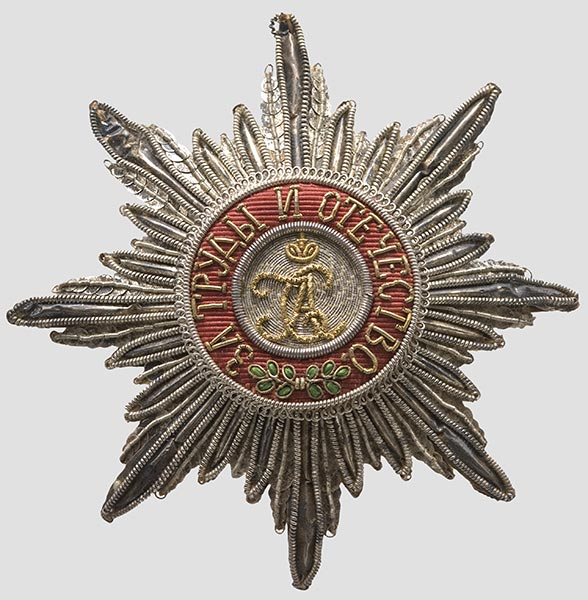
Star version from silver-thread embroidery on white leather, edition ca 1840

== Recipients ==
- Abbas II of Egypt
- Adam Olsufiev
- Count Nikolay Adlerberg
- Duke Adolf Friedrich of Mecklenburg
- Afonso, Prince of Beira
- Ahmad Shah Qajar
- Albert I of Belgium
- Prince Albert of Prussia (1809–1872)
- Prince Albert of Saxe-Altenburg
- Archduke Albrecht, Duke of Teschen
- Albert, Prince Consort
- Yevgeni Ivanovich Alekseyev
- Alexander I of Russia
- Alexander II of Russia
- Alexander III of Russia
- Alexander Kurakin (1697)
- Alexander Nikolaevich Golitsyn
- Duke Alexander of Oldenburg
- Duke Alexander of Württemberg (1771–1833)
- Alexander Pietrov
- Aleksandr Tatischev
- Alexei Nikolaevich, Tsarevich of Russia
- Alfred, 2nd Prince of Montenuovo
- Ippolit Andreev
- Ivane Andronikashvili
- Fyodor Apraksin
- Prince Arisugawa Takehito
- Prince Arisugawa Taruhito
- Prince August, Duke of Dalarna
- Prince August of Württemberg
- Prince Augustus of Prussia
- Theodor Avellan
- Karl Gustav von Baggovut
- Pyotr Bagration
- Pyotr Romanovich Bagration
- Alexander Barclay de Tolly-Weymarn
- Michael Andreas Barclay de Tolly
- Joachim Otto von Bassewitz
- Vasili Bebutov
- Friedrich von Beck-Rzikowsky
- Constantine Esperovich Beloselsky-Belozersky
- Alexander von Benckendorff (diplomat)
- Andrew Bertie
- Aleksei Birilev
- Otto von Bismarck
- Gebhard Leberecht von Blücher
- Georgy Bobrikov
- Nikolai Bobyr
- Julius von Bose
- Nikolai von Bunge
- Prince Carl, Duke of Västergötland
- Carlos I of Portugal
- Charles X
- Charles XIII
- Charles XV
- Zakhar Chernyshev
- Piotr Grigoryevich Chernyshev
- Christian IX of Denmark
- Andrzej Ciechanowiecki
- Mikhail Pavlovich Danilov
- Nikolay Ivanovich Demidov
- Porfirio Díaz
- Hans Karl von Diebitsch
- Dmitry Dashkov
- Dmitry Petrovich Dokhturov
- Vasily Dolgorukov-Krymsky
- Mikhail Drozdovsky
- Fyodor Dubasov
- Adam Duncan, 1st Viscount Duncan
- Alexander Alexandrovich Dushkevich
- Andrei Eberhardt
- Edward VII
- Johann Martin von Elmpt
- Ernest I, Duke of Saxe-Coburg and Gotha
- Vladimir Etush
- Archduke Eugen of Austria
- Aleksei Evert
- Ferdinand I of Bulgaria
- Ferdinand II of Portugal
- Ferdinand VII of Spain
- Prince Ferdinand of Saxe-Coburg and Gotha
- Francis IV, Duke of Modena
- Franz Joseph I of Austria
- Archduke Franz Karl of Austria
- Frederick VI of Denmark
- Frederick VII of Denmark
- Frederick VIII of Denmark
- Frederick I, Grand Duke of Baden
- Prince Frederick, Duke of York and Albany
- Frederick William III of Prussia
- Prince Frederick of the Netherlands
- Frederick Charles Louis, Duke of Schleswig-Holstein-Sonderburg-Beck
- Archduke Friedrich, Duke of Teschen
- Ilija Garašanin
- Ivan Fullon
- Prince Fushimi Sadanaru
- Ivan Ganetsky
- Ivan Gannibal
- Gavriil Gagarin
- George IV
- George V
- George Mikhailovich Romanov
- Aleksandr Gerngross
- Alexander von Güldenstubbe
- August Neidhardt von Gneisenau
- Dmitry Mikhailovich Golitsyn the Elder
- Dmitry Mikhailovich Golitsyn the Younger
- Colmar Freiherr von der Goltz
- Nikolay Gondatti
- Gregory IV of Antioch
- Oskar Gripenberg
- Curtis Guild Jr.
- Wladyslaw Gurowski
- Gustaf V
- Gustaf VI Adolf
- Gustav, Prince of Vasa
- Haakon VII of Norway
- John Maurice Hauke
- Lodewijk van Heiden
- Prince Heinrich XV of Reuss-Plauen
- Gregor von Helmersen
- Prince Henry of Prussia (1781–1846)
- Prince Hermann of Saxe-Weimar-Eisenach (1825–1901)
- Gavriil Ignatyev
- Illarion Illarionovich Vasilchikov
- Alexander Imeretinsky
- Ivan Cherkasov
- Archduke John of Austria
- Prince Johann of Schleswig-Holstein-Sonderburg-Glücksburg
- John VI of Portugal
- Joseph, Duke of Saxe-Altenburg
- Kyprian Kandratovich
- Prince Kan'in Kotohito
- Karl Anton, Prince of Hohenzollern
- Karl Philipp, Prince of Schwarzenberg
- Prince Karl Theodor of Bavaria
- Alexander von Kaulbars
- Paisi Kaysarov
- Amanullah Khan
- Mikhail Khilkov
- Pyotr Kikin
- Jan Hendrik van Kinsbergen
- Hugo von Kirchbach
- Prince Kitashirakawa Yoshihisa
- Johann von Klenau
- Hans von Koester
- Prince Komatsu Akihito
- Grand Duke Konstantin Konstantinovich of Russia
- Grand Duke Konstantin Nikolayevich of Russia
- Konstantin of Hohenlohe-Schillingsfürst
- Johann Albrecht Korff
- Apostol Kostanda
- Wincenty Krasinski
- Mikhail Krechetnikov
- Alexey Kurakin
- Boris Kurakin (1733)
- Aleksey Kuropatkin
- Mikhail Kutuzov
- Sergey Stepanovich Lanskoy
- Mikhail Lazarev
- Leopold I of Belgium
- Leopold II of Belgium
- Leopold IV, Duke of Anhalt
- Alexander Mikhailovich Lermontov
- George Maximilianovich, 6th Duke of Leuchtenberg
- Sergei Georgievich, 8th Duke of Leuchtenberg
- Levan V Dadiani
- Louis IV, Grand Duke of Hesse
- Louis XVIII
- Prince Louis of Battenberg
- Friedrich von Löwis of Menar
- Archduke Ludwig Viktor of Austria
- Luís I of Portugal
- Manuel II of Portugal
- Grand Duchess Maria Vladimirovna of Russia
- Mikhail Matyushkin
- Duke William of Mecklenburg-Schwerin
- Duke Charles of Mecklenburg
- Samad bey Mehmandarov
- Emmanuel von Mensdorff-Pouilly
- Klemens von Metternich
- Feofil Egorovich Meyendorf
- Grand Duke Michael Nikolaevich of Russia
- Grand Duke Michael Alexandrovich of Russia
- Miguel I of Portugal
- Mikhail Volkonsky
- Milan I of Serbia
- Mikhail Miloradovich
- Pavel Mishchenko
- Mohammed Alim Khan
- Alexander von Moller
- Helmuth von Moltke the Elder
- Nikolay Mordvinov (admiral)
- Burkhard Christoph von Münnich
- Mikhail Nikitich Muravyov
- Valentin Musin-Pushkin
- Ivan Nabokov
- Napoleon III
- Kamran Mirza Nayeb es-Saltaneh
- Ivan Neplyuyev
- Nicholas I of Russia
- Nicholas II of Russia
- Grand Duke Nicholas Nikolaevich of Russia (1831–1891)
- Arkady Nikanorovich Nishenkov
- August Ludwig von Nostitz
- Karl Nesselrode
- Peter Obolyaninov
- Alexey Fyodorovich Orlov
- Oscar II
- Fabian Gottlieb von der Osten-Sacken
- Archduke Otto of Austria (1865–1906)
- Gore Ouseley
- Fyodor Palitzin
- Duke Paul Frederick of Mecklenburg
- Pavel Yaguzhinsky
- Pedro V of Portugal
- Duke Peter of Oldenburg
- Prince Philippe, Count of Flanders
- Karl Ludwig von Phull
- Konstanty Ludwik Plater
- Mikhail Mikhailovich Pleshkov
- Stanislaw August Poniatowski
- Alexander Stepanovich Popov
- Carlo Andrea Pozzo di Borgo
- Yevfimiy Putyatin
- Mohammad Shah Qajar
- Mohammad Taqi Mirza Rokn ed-Dowleh
- Mozaffar ad-Din Shah Qajar
- Naser al-Din Shah Qajar
- Fyodor Radetsky
- Evgeny Aleksandrovich Radkevich
- Alexander Ragoza
- Henri de Rigny
- Roman Vorontsov
- Christopher Roop
- Rudolf, Prince of Liechtenstein
- Rudolf, Crown Prince of Austria
- Adam Rzhevusky
- Anton Yegorovich von Saltza
- Alexander Samsonov
- Johan Eberhard von Schantz
- Sergei Sheydeman
- Yakov Schkinsky
- Alexei Senyavin
- Grand Duke Sergei Alexandrovich of Russia
- Ivan Shestakov
- Georg von Stackelberg
- Gustav Ernst von Stackelberg
- Curt von Stedingk
- Archduke Stephen of Austria (Palatine of Hungary)
- Vladimir Sukhomlinov
- Alexander Suvorov
- Fyodor Ushakov
- Peter Tekeli
- Alfred von Tirpitz
- Dmitry Troshchinsky
- Erast Tsytovich
- Prince Valdemar of Denmark
- Sergei Vasilchikov
- Georgy Vasmund
- Nikita Villebois
- Grand Duke Vladimir Alexandrovich of Russia
- Grand Duke Vladimir Kirillovich of Russia
- Sava Vladislavich
- Illarion Vorontsov-Dashkov
- Arthur Wellesley, 1st Duke of Wellington
- Wilhelm II, German Emperor
- William I of Württemberg
- William I, German Emperor
- William II of the Netherlands
- William II of Württemberg
- William IV
- Duke William of Württemberg
- Sergei Witte
- Duke Eugen of Württemberg (1788–1857)
- Sir James Wylie, 1st Baronet
- Yamagata Aritomo
- Aleksey Petrovich Yermolov
- Prince Zaitao
- Matija Zmajevic
- Dmitry Zuyev
