= Order of the White Eagle (Russian Empire) =

Military decoration of the Russian Empire

Imperial Order of the White Eagle Орден Белого орла
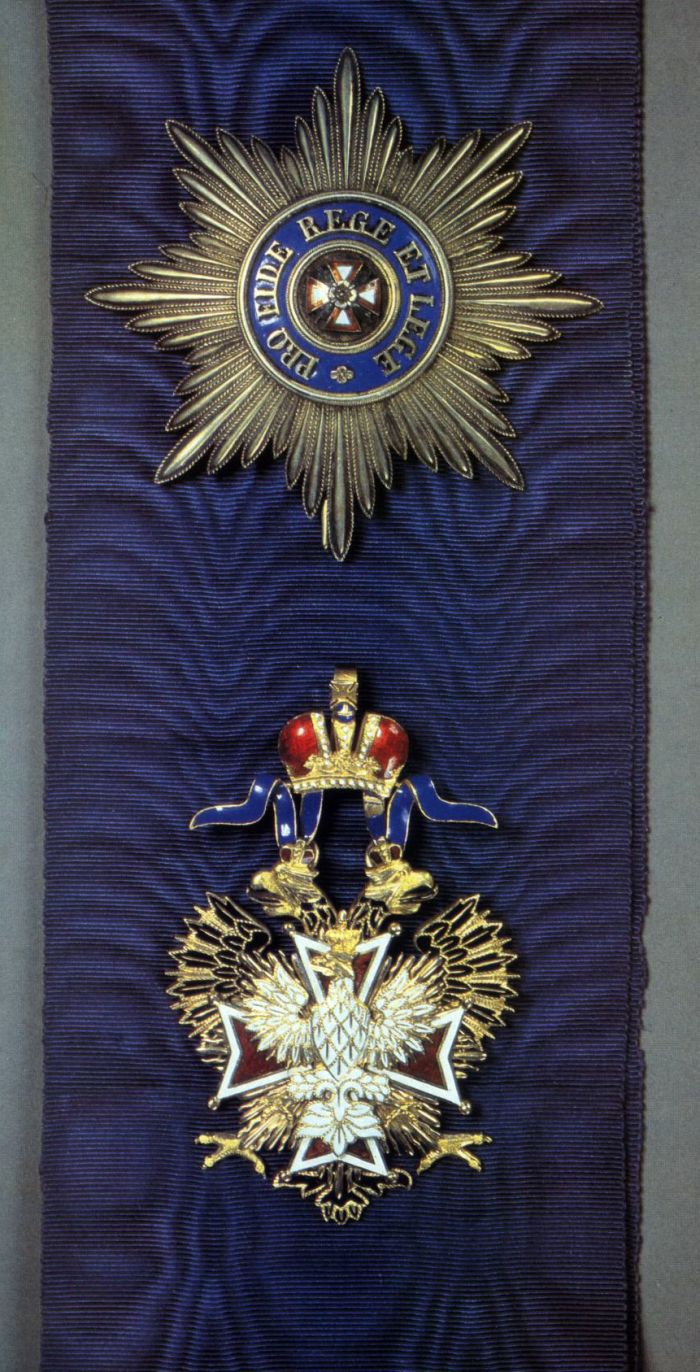
- Grand Cordon set

Awarded by Head of the House of Romanov
- Type: Dynastic Order
- Royal house: House of Romanov
- Religious affiliation: Russian Orthodox
- Motto: Pro Fide, Rege et Lege; For Faith, The King and The Law
- Status: Rarely constituted
- Sovereign: None
- Grades: Knight

Precedence
- Next (higher): Imperial Order of St. Prince Alexander Nevsky
- Next (lower): Imperial Military Order of St. George
- Ribbon of the order

The Imperial Order of the White Eagle (Russian: О́рден Бе́лого орла́) was an Imperial Russian Order based on the Polish honor. Emperor Nicholas I of Russia established the award in 1831 as the Imperial and Royal Order of the White Eagle. A recipient of the Order was granted the title Knight of the Imperial (and Royal) Order of the White Eagle.

== Background ==
The "white eagle" has been associated with Poland even prior to statehood; first appearing on the Polish Coat of Arms in the 13th century. The original Order of the White Eagle (Polish: Order Orła Białego) was reputedly established by King Władysław I in 1325. There is no evidence of it being awarded, however, until 1705 under Augustus II the Strong, King of the Polish–Lithuanian Commonwealth.

After the Third Partition of Poland in 1795, the Order of the White Eagle briefly disappeared along with the Polish monarchy. After his death in 1798, Empress Alexandra wore the Collar of the Grand Master of the Order at Nicholas’s coronation as King of Poland. The order was resurrected in 1807 by Napoleon I in his short-lived Duchy of Warsaw.

In 1815, the Congress of Vienna divided the historically Polish lands among Prussia, the Austrian Empire and the Russian Empire. A part of the Duchy of Warsaw, making up around 12% of the territory of the former Commonwealth, was renamed the Kingdom of Poland and was to be an autonomous part of the Russian Empire.

The Order of the White Eagle is mentioned as belonging to the Kingdom of Poland in its constitution of 1815:

The Polish civilian and military Orders, of the White Eagle, Saint Stanislaus and the Cross of the Military, are preserved. (Ordery Polskie cywilne i woyskowe, to iest: Orła Białego, Świętego Stanisława i Krzyża Woyskowego, są zachowane.)

— Constitution of the Kingdom of Poland, Article 160, 27 November 1815

During the years immediately following the Congress of Vienna, the badge and cross of the Order were awarded with the same Polish insignia, but the majority of the recipients were Russians or members of the Austrian Empire.

After Russian troops put down the Polish uprising of 1830-31, Nicholas I stripped the autonomy from the Kingdom of Poland and adopted all Polish orders of merit.

== Order within the Russian Empire ==
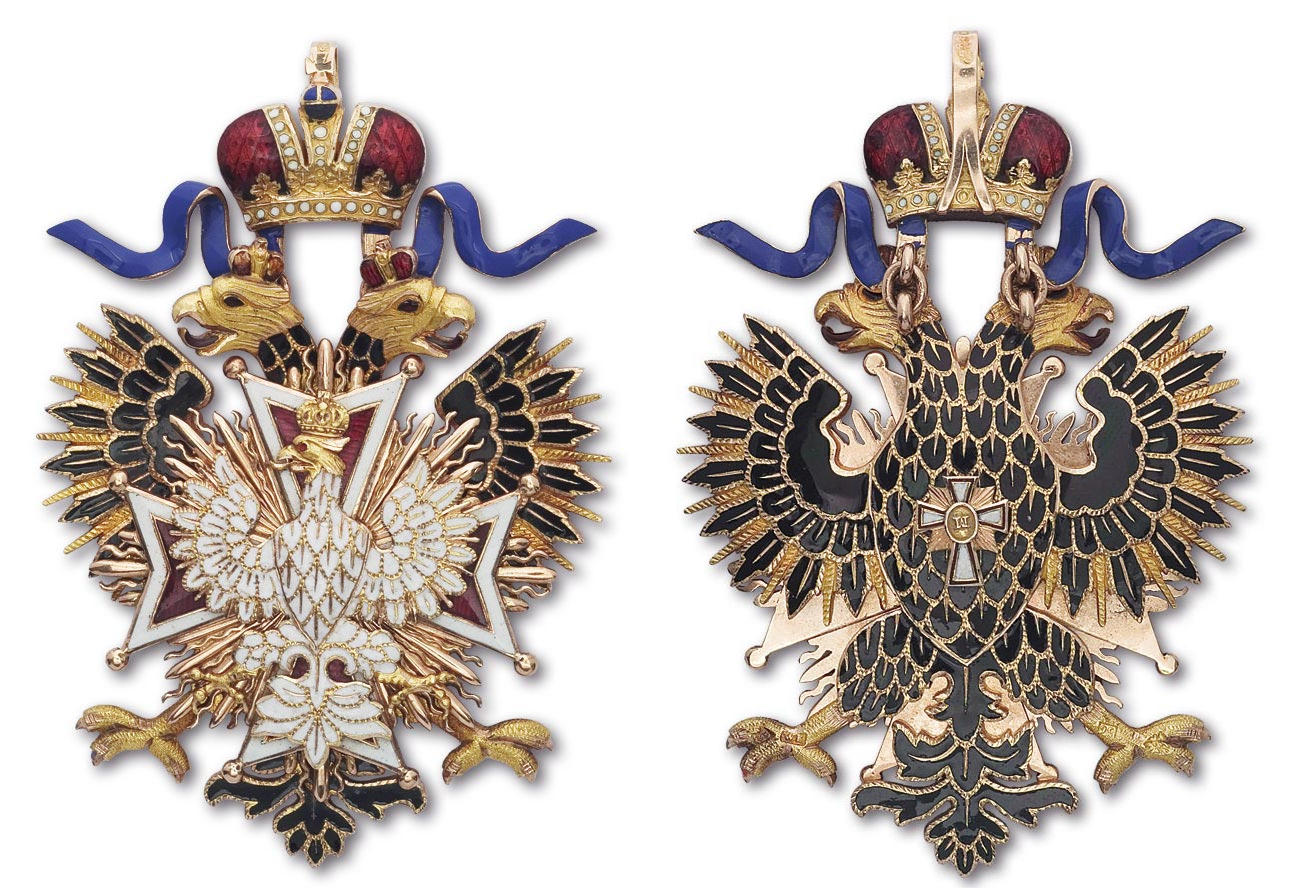
The badge of the Order of the White Eagle, 1863

The Order of the White Eagle was officially "annexed" by Nicholas I on 17 November 1831 and became part of the Russian Imperial honors system. Among the first recipients of the Imperial Order of the White Eagle were Ivan Paskevich and Pyotr Petrovich Palen, recognised for their part in suppressing the Polish uprising.

The new design featured significant alterations: the badge was now of gold and red enamel; on the front, the original red maltese cross and white eagle were reduced in size and superimposed over the double-headed eagle of the Russian Empire. The back of the badge featured the original Polish badge design, superimposed over the Russian imperial eagle. The star now featured the Russian royal crown.

On 25 January 1832, a blue ribbon and sash were introduced.

The Order of the White Eagle was given a high status in the hierarchy of distinction, ranked only behind the Order of Saint Andrew, the Order of Saint Catherine (for women only) and the Order of Saint Alexander Nevsky. As the top three awards were named after Russian Orthodox saints, the Order of the White Eagle was the preferred award to bestow upon non-Christians. It granted hereditary nobility.

== Recipients ==
List of recipients of Order of the White Eagle (Russian Empire)
- Alexander Abaza
- 'Abd al-Ahad Khan
- Count Nikolay Adlerberg
- Adolphus Frederick V, Grand Duke of Mecklenburg-Strelitz
- Ahmad Shah Qajar
- Albert I of Belgium
- Prince Albert of Prussia (1809–1872)
- Archduke Albrecht, Duke of Teschen
- Albert, Prince Consort
- Yevgeni Ivanovich Alekseyev
- Alexander III of Russia
- Alexander Nikolaevich Golitsyn
- Alexander of Battenberg
- Prince Alexander of Hesse and by Rhine
- Duke Alexander of Oldenburg
- Grand Duke Alexei Alexandrovich of Russia
- Grand Duke Alexei Mikhailovich of Russia
- Alexei Nikolaevich, Tsarevich of Russia
- Alfred, 2nd Prince of Montenuovo
- Gyula Andrássy
- Ippolit Andreev
- Avraamy Aslanbegov
- August Gyldenstolpe
- Prince August, Duke of Dalarna
- Prince August of Württemberg
- Theodor Avellan
- Count Kasimir Felix Badeni
- Ivane Bagration of Mukhrani
- Pyotr Romanovich Bagration
- Alexander Barclay de Tolly-Weymarn
- Vasili Bebutov
- Alexander von Benckendorff (diplomat)
- Bhanurangsi Savangwongse
- Nikolai Bibikov
- Aleksei Birilev
- Otto von Bismarck
- Georgy Bobrikov
- Nikolay Bobrikov
- Woldemar von Boeckmann
- Władysław Grzegorz Branicki
- Charles James Briggs
- Pavel Bulgakov
- Prince Carl, Duke of Västergötland
- Carlos I of Portugal
- Charles XV
- Alexander Chavchavadze
- Christian IX of Denmark
- Mikhail Pavlovich Danilov
- Dmitry Dashkov
- Charles de Broqueville
- Rudolf von Delbrück
- Ivan Delyanov
- Dmitry Petrovich Dokhturov
- Mikhail Drozdovsky
- Fyodor Dubasov
- John Lambton, 1st Earl of Durham
- Alexander Alexandrovich Dushkevich
- Edward VII
- Ernest Louis, Grand Duke of Hesse
- Nikolai Ottovich von Essen
- Archduke Eugen of Austria
- Aleksei Evert
- Ferdinand I of Bulgaria
- Ferdinand II of Portugal
- Archduke Ferdinand Karl Joseph of Austria-Este
- Giustino Fortunato (1777–1862)
- Francis IV, Duke of Modena
- Franz Joseph I of Austria
- Archduke Franz Karl of Austria
- Frederick VIII of Denmark
- Frederick Francis III, Grand Duke of Mecklenburg-Schwerin
- Frederick I, Grand Duke of Baden
- Archduke Friedrich, Duke of Teschen
- Ivan Fullon
- Axel Gadolin
- Ivan Ganetsky
- George V
- Aleksandr Gerngross
- Fyodor Logginovich van Heiden
- Alexander von Güldenstubbe
- Grigory Golitsyn
- Vladimir Gorbatovsky
- Oskar Gripenberg
- Iosif Gurko
- Gustaf V
- Gustaf VI Adolf
- Ferenc Gyulay
- Haakon VII of Norway
- Lodewijk van Heiden
- Prince Heinrich of Hesse and by Rhine
- Dmitry Horvat
- Alexander Ievreinov
- Illarion Vasilchikov
- Alexander Imeretinsky
- Maurice Janin
- Archduke John of Austria
- Prince Johann of Schleswig-Holstein-Sonderburg-Glücksburg
- Joseph, Duke of Saxe-Altenburg
- Georg von Kameke
- Kyprian Kandratovich
- Karl Anton, Prince of Hohenzollern
- Prince Karl Theodor of Bavaria
- Nikolai Kashtalinsky
- Alexander von Kaulbars
- Gustav von Kessel
- Grand Duke Konstantin Konstantinovich of Russia
- Grand Duke Konstantin Nikolayevich of Russia
- Konstantin Poltoratsky
- Konstantin of Hohenlohe-Schillingsfürst
- Apostol Kostanda
- Alexander Krivoshein
- Aleksey Kuropatkin
- Karl Lambert
- Sergey Stepanovich Lanskoy
- Leonid Lesh
- Leopold II of Belgium
- Alexander Mikhailovich Lermontov
- George Maximilianovich, 6th Duke of Leuchtenberg
- Sergei Georgievich, 8th Duke of Leuchtenberg
- Kazimir Vasilevich Levitsky
- Louis IV, Grand Duke of Hesse
- Prince Louis of Battenberg
- Alexander von Lüders
- Archduke Ludwig Viktor of Austria
- Luís I of Portugal
- Alexey Manikovsky
- Manuel II of Portugal
- Friedrich Martens
- Esma'il Mass'oud
- Maximilian I of Mexico
- Duke William of Mecklenburg-Schwerin
- Samad bey Mehmandarov
- Emmanuel von Mensdorff-Pouilly
- Feofil Egorovich Meyendorf
- Grand Duke Michael Nikolaevich of Russia
- Grand Duke Michael Alexandrovich of Russia
- Konstantin Mikhaylovsky
- Milan I of Serbia
- Min Young-hwan
- Mikhail Mirkovich
- Sayyid Mir Muhammad Alim Khan
- Alexander von Moller
- Helmuth von Moltke the Elder
- Huseyn Khan Nakhchivanski
- Pavel Nakhimov
- Napoleon III
- Kamran Mirza Nayeb es-Saltaneh
- Nicholas II of Russia
- Nicholas Alexandrovich, Tsesarevich of Russia
- Grand Duke Nicholas Nikolaevich of Russia (1831–1891)
- Arkady Nikanorovich Nishenkov
- Vladimir Nikolayevich Nikitin
- August Ludwig von Nostitz
- Nikolai Obolensky
- David Ivanovich Orlov
- Oscar II
- Archduke Otto of Austria (1865–1906)
- Otto of Bavaria
- Alexander August Wilhelm von Pape
- Honório Hermeto Carneiro Leão, Marquis of Paraná
- José Paranhos, Viscount of Rio Branco
- Ivan Paskevich
- Grand Duke Paul Alexandrovich of Russia
- Duke Paul Frederick of Mecklenburg
- Pedro V of Portugal
- Duke Peter of Oldenburg
- Prince Philippe, Count of Flanders
- Mikhail Mikhailovich Pleshkov
- Karl von Plettenberg
- Mohammad Ali Shah Qajar
- Mohammad Shah Qajar
- Mohammad Taqi Mirza Rokn ed-Dowleh
- Mozaffar ad-Din Shah Qajar
- Naser al-Din Shah Qajar
- Fyodor Radetsky
- Antoni Wilhelm Radziwiłł
- Christopher Roop
- Prince Rudolf of Liechtenstein
- Rudolf, Crown Prince of Austria
- Adam Rzhevusky
- Saitō Makoto
- John Salmond
- Anton Yegorovich von Saltza
- Alexander Samsonov
- Pavel Savvich
- Johan Eberhard von Schantz
- Sergei Sheydeman
- Yakov Schkinsky
- Emil von Schlitz
- Gustav von Senden-Bibran
- Grand Duke Sergei Alexandrovich of Russia
- Maximilian Seyssel d'Aix
- Ivan Ivanovich Shamshev
- Ivan Shestakov
- Dmitry Shuvayev
- Arkady Skugarevsky
- Vladimir Vasilyevich Smirnov
- Mikhail Sokovin
- Hermann von Spaun
- Archduke Stephen of Austria (Palatine of Hungary)
- Pyotr Stolypin
- Vladimir Sukhomlinov
- Dmitry Ivanovich Sviatopolk-Mirsky
- Ludwig Freiherr von und zu der Tann-Rathsamhausen
- Arshak Ter-Gukasov
- Alfred von Tirpitz
- Richard Turner
- Uchiyama Kojirō
- Paul Simon Unterberger
- Prince Valdemar of Denmark
- Sergei Vasilchikov
- Georgy Vasmund
- Julius von Verdy du Vernois
- Anthony Veselovsky
- Charles Vilain XIIII
- Grand Duke Vladimir Alexandrovich of Russia
- Grand Duke Vladimir Kirillovich of Russia
- Illarion Vorontsov-Dashkov
- Wilhelm II, German Emperor
- William II of Württemberg
- Sergei Witte
- Vasily Zavoyko
- Mass'oud Mirza Zell-e Soltan
- Ferdinand von Zeppelin
- Yakov Zhilinsky
- Dmitry Zuyev
- Alexander Pietrov

== See also ==
- Order of the White Eagle (Poland)
- Order of the White Eagle (Serbia)
