= Alexander von Moller =

Imperial Russian division commander (1796–1862)

Alexander Fedorovich von Moller
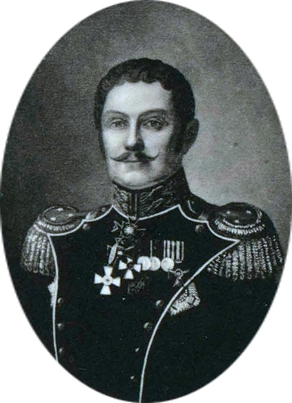
- Born: 1796
- Died: 1862 (aged 65–66) Saint Petersburg, Russian Empire
- Allegiance: Russian Empire
- Branch: Imperial Russian Army
- Commands: 1st Brigade, 2nd Grenadier Division; 3rd Guards Infantry Division; 1st Guards Infantry Division
- Conflicts: November Uprising

Alexander Fedorovich von Moller (1796–1862) was an Imperial Russian division commander. He took in the suppression of the uprising in Poland.

== Awards ==
- Order of Saint George, 4th degree, 1833
- Order of Saint Stanislaus (House of Romanov), 1st class, 1834
- Order of Saint Anna, 1st class, 1838
- Order of Saint Vladimir, 3rd class, 1845
- Order of the White Eagle (Russian Empire), 1847
- Order of Saint Alexander Nevsky, 1849

== Sources ==
- Волков С. В. Генералитет Российской империи. Энциклопедический словарь генералов и адмиралов от Петра I до Николая II. Том II. Л—Я. — М., 2009. — С. 164. ISBN 978-5-9524-4167-5
- История лейб-гвардии Егерского полка за сто лет. 1796–1896. Составлена офицерами полка. СПб., 1896
- Степанов В. С., Григорович П. И. В память столетнего юбилея императорского Военного ордена Святого великомученика и Победоносца Георгия. (1769–1869). СПб., 1869
- Алфавит декабристов

Preceded by	Commander of the 1st Brigade, 2nd Grenadier Division; 1832-1833	Succeeded by
Preceded by	Commander of the 3rd Guards Infantry Division; 1841-1846	Succeeded by
Preceded by	Commander of the 1st Guards Infantry Division; 1846-1855	Succeeded by Alexander Gildenshtubbe
