= Avraamy Aslanbegov =

Vice-admiral and military writer of the Russian Empire

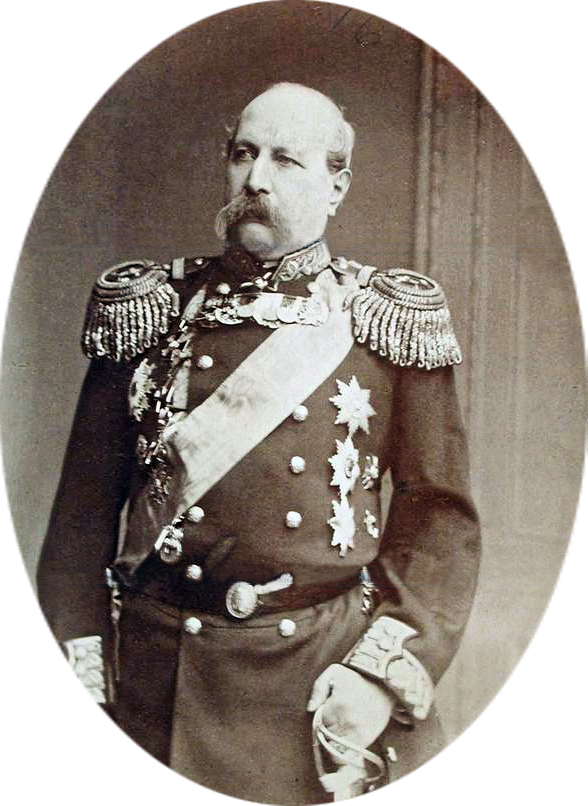
- Portrait by Andrey Denyer
- Native name: Ibrahim bəy Aslanbəyov
- Born: 22 September 1822; Baku, Russian Empire
- Died: 20 December 1900 (aged 78) Saint Petersburg, Russian Empire
- Allegiance: Russian Empire
- Branch: Imperial Russian Navy
- Service years: 1837-1898
- Rank: Vice Admiral
- Conflicts: Polish-Russian wars; January Uprising; Crimean War; Siege of Sevastopol
- Awards: see details

Avraamy Bogdanovich Aslanbegov or Aslanbekov (Russian: Аврамий Богданович Асланбегов; 22 September [O.S. 10 September] 1822, Baku – 20 December [O.S. 7 December] 1900, Saint Petersburg) was a vice-admiral and military writer of the Russian Empire of Kabardian or Azerbaijani origin.

== Career ==
A convert to Eastern Orthodox Christianity, Aslanbegov graduated with honours from the Naval Cadet Corps in 1837. He started his military career by serving in the Baltic Fleet. After obtaining his officer rank he began serving in the Black Sea Fleet. Aslanbegov participated in the Crimean War of 1854–1856 and fought alongside Pavel Nakhimov during the Siege of Sevastopol. In the late 1850s and the 1860s he continued to serve in the Baltic and the Black Sea, and sailed across the Mediterranean. In the early 1870s he was member of the committee in charge of developing the sea-borne trade. In 1879 Aslanbegov was appointed Commander of the Pacific Ocean Squadron. In 1881 he circumnavigated the globe from the Baltic through North America and Asia-Pacific to the Far East where he served until his retirement in 1882.

== Awards and decorations ==
=== Russian Empire: ===
- Order of St. Stanislaus
  - 3rd class (1856)
  - 1st class (1881)
- Order of St. Anna
  - 2nd class (1855)
  - 1st class (1883)
- Order of St. Vladimir
  - 4th class (1857)
  - 3rd class (1874)
  - 2nd class (1885)
- Medal for Defence of Sevastopol (1855)
- Medal for Memory of the war of 1853-1856 (1856)
- Medal for Suppression of January Uprising (1877)
- Order of the White Eagle (1888)
- Badge for impeccable service (1889)

=== Foreign: ===
- Serbia - Order of the Cross of Takovo (1879
- Japan - Order of the Rising Sun 2nd class (1882)
- Hawaii - Royal Order of Kalākaua 2nd class (1882)
