= Christopher Roop =

Lieutenant General in the Imperial Russian Army

Christopher Khristoforovich Roop
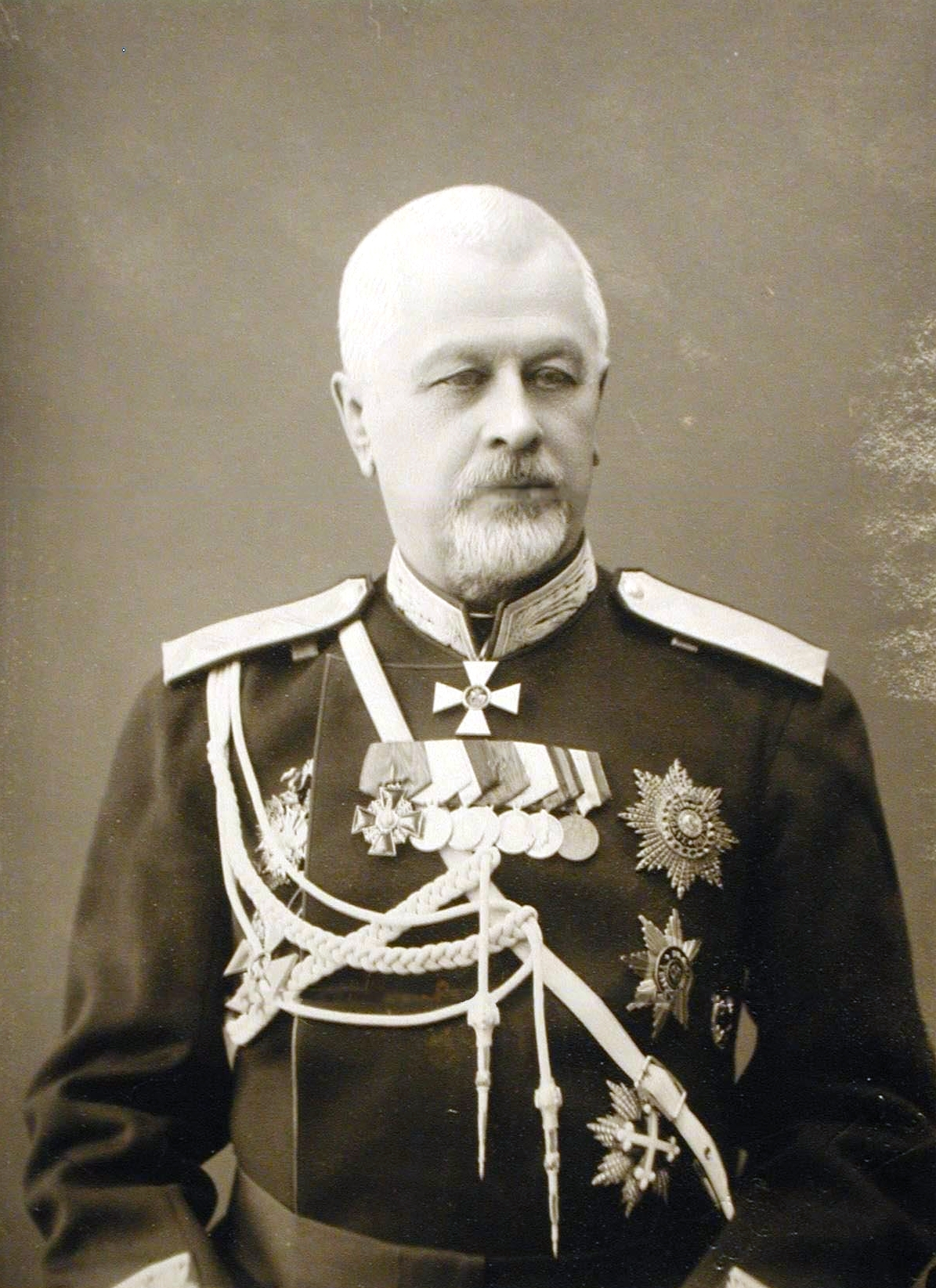
- Born: 1 May 1831 (N.S. 13 May)
- Died: 1917 Petrograd
- Allegiance: Russian Empire
- Branch: Imperial Russian Army
- Commands: 1st Grenadier Division; 6th Army Corps

Christopher Khristoforovich Roop (Russian: Христофор Христофорович Рооп; 1 May 1831 – 1917) was an Imperial Russian army officer. He was promoted to Polkovnik (colonel) in 1857, major general in 1863 and lieutenant general in 1871.

== Awards ==
- Order of Saint Stanislaus (House of Romanov), 3rd class, 1856
- Order of Saint Stanislaus (House of Romanov), 2nd class, 1858
- Order of Saint Anna, 2nd class, 1862
- Order of Saint Stanislaus (House of Romanov), 1st class, 1865
- Order of Saint Anna, 1st class, 1867
- Order of Saint Vladimir, 2nd class, 1874
- Order of Saint George, 3rd degree, 1877
- Order of the White Eagle (Russian Empire), 1883
- Order of Saint Alexander Nevsky, 1888
- Order of Saint Vladimir, 1st class, 1899
- Order of Saint Andrew, 1913

| Preceded by | Chief of Staff of the 1st Guards Infantry Division; 1858-1860 | Succeeded by |
| Preceded by | Commander of the 1st Grenadier Division; 1875-1878 | Succeeded by |
| Preceded by | Commander of the 6th Army Corps; 1878-1883 | Succeeded by |
