= Ippolit Andreev =

Ippolit Petrovich Andreev
- Born: 18 December 1844; Russian Empire
- Died: unknown
- Military career
- Allegiance: Russian Empire
- Branch: Imperial Russian Army
- Rank: General of the branch

Ippolit Petrovich Andreev (Russian: Ипполит Петрович Андреев; 18 December 1844 - fl. 1914) was a Russian naval officer, general of the fleet, and chairman of the Main Naval Court.

== Biography ==
He served in the Navy after graduating from the Naval Cadet Corps in 1864. Since 1872, he served on the judicial promulgation. In 1878 he received the rank of captain-lieutenant of the Maritime Court, in 1891 - colonel, in 1896 received the rank of Major-General, and in 1904 - Lieutenant-General. He worked as chairman of the Sevastopol Naval Court. In 1907 he became a member of the Main Naval Court of the Russian Empire, in 1909 Ippolit became a general of the fleet and in 1911 he became chairman of the Main Naval Court of the Russian Empire.

== Awards ==
- Order of Saint Alexander Nevsky
- Order of the White Eagle
- Order of Saint Vladimir second class
- Order of Saint Anna first class
- Order of Saint Stanislav first class
