= 3rd Grenadier Division =

Russian military unit (1813, 1877–1916)

- Active: 1813; 1877–1916
- Allegiance: Russian Empire
- Branch: Imperial Russian Army
- Type: Grenadier Corps

The 3rd Grenadier Division was an infantry unit in the Imperial Russian Army as part of the Grenadier Corps. Its headquarters was located at Moscow.

== History ==
Grenadiers as elite soldiers first appeared in the Russian Armed Forces under Peter the Great, forming separate companies within the guard and regular infantry regiments, as well as in the form of grenadier regiments.

In the 18th century, grenadier units (regiments and battalions) in the Russian army were not separate formations but operated as part of larger infantry units. On January 17, 1811, during a reorganization of the divisions that had existed in the Russian army as tactical formations since 1806, the 1st Division was composed of grenadier regiments, and on March 27, 1811, the 2nd Division was formed from grenadier regiments. In April 1814, these divisions were reorganized into the 1st, 2nd, and 3rd Grenadier Divisions with new compositions.

On April 3, 1814, for distinction, the 1st Grenadier Division included the 1st and 3rd Jaeger Regiments, with the adjective "grenadier" added to their names, while the Pernov and Kexholm Grenadier Regiments, previously part of the 1st Division, were transferred to the newly formed 3rd Grenadier Division.

During World War I, the 3rd Grenadier Division fought against German and Austro-Hungarian forces on the Western and Southwestern Fronts.

In August 1914, the division took part in the Battle of Galicia as part of the 25th Army of the 5th Army. During the Battle of Tomashov (or the Battle of Komarów), the division suffered heavy losses and retreated in disorder. As a result, the division commander, General-Lieutenant F.N. Dobryshin, was relieved of his command.

The division participated in the Czestochowa-Kraków operation in November 1914, the Battle of Tanev from June 18 to 25, 1915, and the Battle of Lublin-Holm from July 9 to 22, 1915.

The 3rd Grenadier Division was disbanded in March 1918.

== Organization ==
Headquarters (Moscow)

1st Grenadier Brigade (Vladimir)

- 9th Siberian Grenadier Regiment
- 10th Little Russian Grenadier Regiment

2nd Grenadier Brigade (Moscow)

- 11th Fanagoria Grenadier Regiment
- 12th Astrakhan Grenadier Regiment

3rd Grenadier Artillery Brigade (Rostov, Yaroslavl Province)

== Commanders ==
- 1877–1884: Mikhail Pavlovich Danilov
- 1884–1889: Nikolai Yakovlevich Zverev
- 1892–1894: AA Chelishev
- 1905–1909: Yakovlev
- 1909–1914: Vladimir Gorbatovsky
- 1914–1916: Kisielewski

== Chiefs of Staff ==
- 1885–1886: Nikolay F Meshetich
- 1914: Vladimir Yegoryev

== Commanders of the 2nd Brigade ==
- 1816–1821: Yevgeny Golovin
- 1889–1892: Golubev
