= Ivan Ganetsky =

Imperial Russian division commander

Ivan Stepanovich Ganetsky
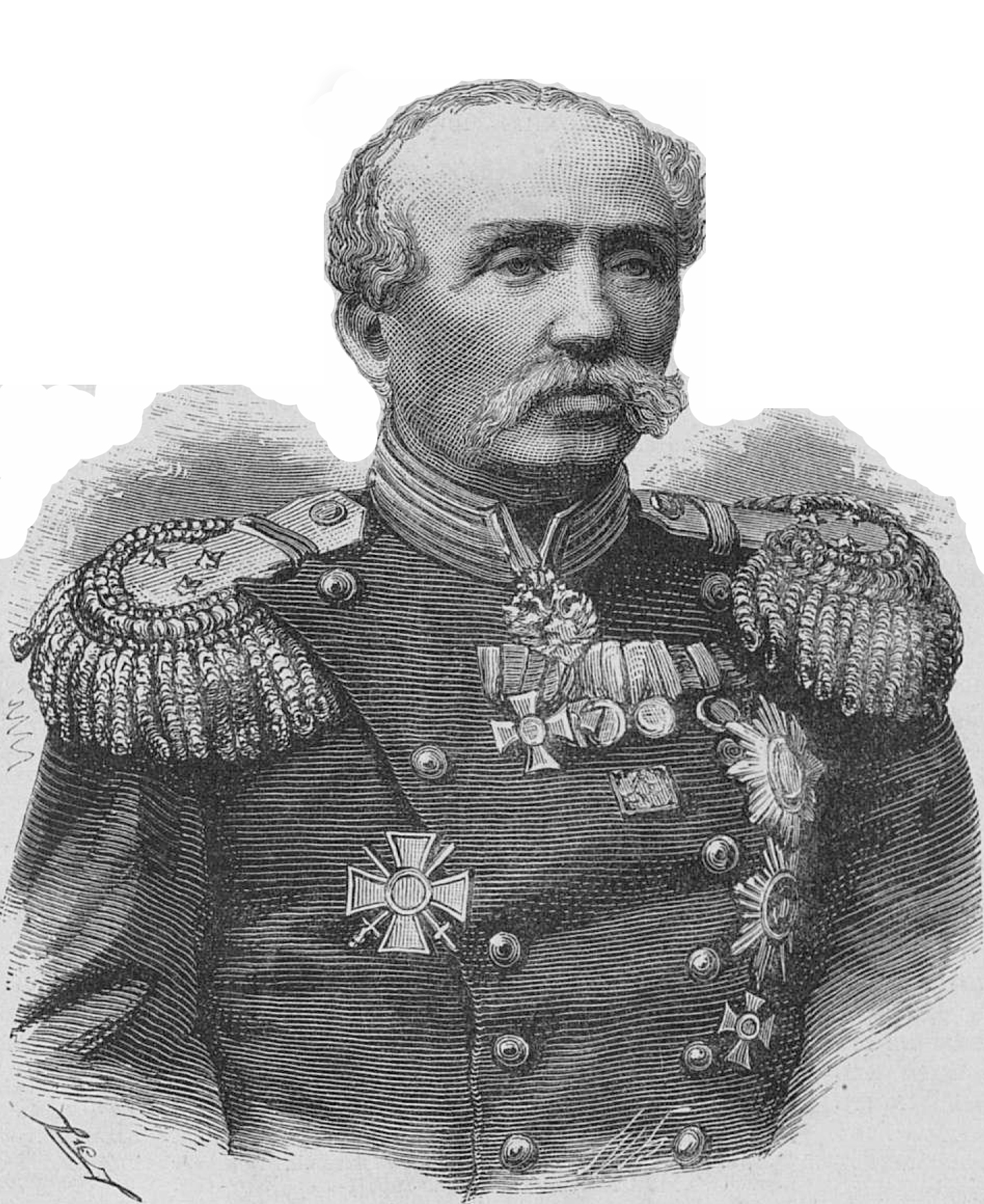
- Born: October 8, 1810
- Died: 1887 (aged 76–77)
- Allegiance: Russian Empire
- Branch: Imperial Russian Army
- Commands: 16th Infantry Division; 3rd Infantry Division
- Conflicts: Caucasian War; January Uprising; Russo-Turkish War

Ivan Stepanovich Ganetsky (Russian: Ива́н Степа́нович Гане́цкий; October 8, 1810 – 1887) was an Imperial Russian division commander. He fought in wars in the Caucasus, Poland and against the Ottoman Empire.

== Biography ==
Born on 26 September (8 October) 1810 in the noble dvoryan Ganetsky family of Polish origin. His mother descends from the Eysymontt (Эсмонт) family.

He made successful military career in the Imperial Russian Army and in 1877 was notable commander in the Siege of Plevna, part of the Russo-Turkish War of 1877–1878.

== Awards ==
- Order of Saint George, 3rd degree, 1877
- Order of Saint George, 4th degree, 1852
- Order of Saint Vladimir, 1st class, 1883
- Order of Saint Vladimir, 2nd class, 1853
- Order of Saint Vladimir, 3rd class, 1853
- Order of Saint Alexander Nevsky, 1871
- Order of Saint Alexander Nevsky with diamonds, 1874
- Order of the White Eagle (Russian Empire), 1864
- Order of Saint Anna, 1st class, 1858
- Order of Saint Anna, 1st class with crown, 1860
- Order of Saint Anna, 2nd class, 1846
- Order of Saint Anna, 2nd class with crown, 1849
- Order of Saint Anna, 3rd class, 1837
- Order of Saint Stanislaus (House of Romanov), 1st class, 1856
- Order of Saint Stanislaus (House of Romanov), 2nd class, 1844

Preceded by	Commander of the 16th Infantry Division; June–August 1863	Succeeded by
Preceded by	Commander of the 3rd Infantry Division; August 1863 – 1876	Succeeded by

== Sources ==
- Редакция журнала. (1878). "Генерал-лейтенант И. С. Ганецкий" (журнал) (74) (Иллюстрированная хроника войны. Приложение к «Всемироной иллюстрациии» ed.): 186.
- Ганецкий, Иван Степанович // Военная энциклопедия : [в 18 т.] / под ред. В. Ф. Новицкого ... [и других: К. И. Величко, А. В. фон-Шварца, В. А. Апушкина, Г. К. фон-Шульца]. — Санкт-Петербург ; [Москва] : Типография т-ва И. Д. Сытина, 1911–1915.
- Милорадович Г. А. Список лиц свиты их величеств с царствования императора Петра I по 1886 г. СПб., 1886.
- Ганецкий, Иван Степанович // Русский биографический словарь : в 25 томах. — Санкт-Петербург—Москва, 1896–1918.
- Список генералам по старшинству на 1886 год. СПб., 1886.
