= Bagrationite =

Variety of allanite mineral

Bagrationite is a variety of allanite, discovered by Georgian Prince Peter Bagrationi in 1847 and named in his honour.
