= 19th Army Corps (Russian Empire) =

Army corps in the Imperial Russian Army

- Country: Russian Empire
- Allegiance: Imperial Russian Army
- Engagements: World War I; Battle of Łódź (1914); Battle of Galicia

The 19th Army Corps was an Army corps in the Imperial Russian Army.

== Composition ==
In 1914, the corps included the following units.

- 17th Infantry Division
- 38th Infantry Division
- 7th Cavalry Division
- 1st Don Cossack Division

== Part of ==
- 5th Army: 1914 – 1915
- 1st Army: 1915
- 5th Army: 1916 – 1917

== Commanders ==
- 1905: Lieutenant general Dmitry Rezvoi
- 1909: Engineer general Evgraf Saranchov
- May 1914 – June 1915: Vladimir Gorbatovsky
- November 1915 – April 1917: Anthony Veselovsky
