= 1st Cavalry Division (Russian Empire) =

- 1-я кавалерийская дивизия
- Active: 1833–1918
- Country: Russian Empire
- Branch: Russian Imperial Army
- Role: Cavalry
- Engagements: World War I; Battle of Tannenberg

The 1st Cavalry Division (Russian: 1-я кавалерийская дивизия, 1-ya Kavaleriiskaya Diviziya) was a cavalry formation of the Russian Imperial Army.

== Organization ==
- 1st Cavalry Brigade
  - 1st Leib-Dragoons of Moscow Regiment
  - 1st Leib-Uhlan of St. Petersburg Regiment
- 2nd Cavalry Brigade
  - 1st Regiment of Hussars of Sumy
  - 1st Don Regiment of Cossacks
- 1st Horse Artillery Divizion (1st and 2nd Batteries)

== Commanders ==
- 1885–1888: Kazimir Vasilevich Levitsky
- 1899–1901: Sergei Vasilchikov

== Commanders of the 1st Brigade ==
- 1884–1891: Alexander Kaulbars
