= Arkady Nishchenkov =

Imperial Russian general

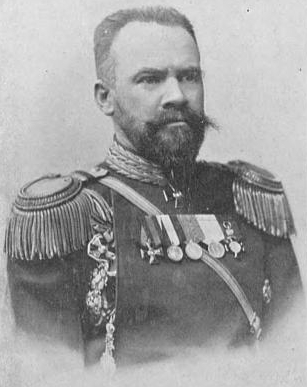
- General Nischenkov, South Manchuria, 1900.
- Native name: Аркадий Никанорович Нищенков
- Born: 6 March 1855; Russian Empire
- Died: 1 February 1940 (aged 84) Rogaška Slatina, Kingdom of Yugoslavia
- Allegiance: Russian Empire
- Branch: (Russian Empire) Imperial Russian Army
- Service years: 1871–1917
- Rank: General of the Artillery
- Commands: Artillery Brigade, 2nd Guards Infantry Division; 2nd Grenadier Division; 1st Siberian Army Corps; 4th Siberian Army Corps; Irkutsk Military District; Amur Military District
- Conflicts: Russo-Turkish War; Boxer Rebellion; Russo-Japanese War; World War I Russian Civil War

Arkady Nikanorovich Nishchenkov (Russian: Аркадий Никанорович Нищенков; 6 March 1855 – February 1940) was an Imperial Russian general of the artillery and corps commander. He fought in the wars against the Ottoman Empire and the Empire of Japan. From 1914 to 1917 he commanded the Amur Military District.

== Awards ==
- Order of Saint Stanislaus (House of Romanov), 1st class, 1904
- Order of Saint Anna, 1st class, 1906
- Order of Saint Vladimir, 2nd class, 1906
- Order of the White Eagle (Russian Empire), 1911
- Order of Saint Alexander Nevsky, 1913

Preceded by	Commander of the Artillery Brigade, 2nd Guards Infantry Division; 1901–1904	Succeeded by
Preceded by	Commander of the 2nd Grenadier Division; 1908–1911	Succeeded by
Preceded by Yakov Schkinsky	Commander of the 1st Siberian Army Corps; 1911–1912	Succeeded by Mikhail Mikhailovich Pleshkov
Preceded by Nikolai Zarubaev	Commander of the 4th Siberian Army Corps; 1912–1913	Succeeded by Sergei Sergeevich Savvich

== Sources ==
- "Arkady Nishchenkov" (in Russian). «Russian army in a Great war» project.
- Авилов Р. С. Приамурский военный округ в годы Первой мировой войны: войска и оборонительные задачи. // Вглядываясь в прошлое. Мировые войны ХХ века в истории Дальнего Востока России. Владивосток: ДВО РАН, 2015. С. 5-41.
- Авилов Р. С., Аюшин Н. Б., Калинин В. И. Владивостокская крепость: войска, фортификация, события, люди. Часть II. Уроки Порт-Артура. 1906—1917 гг. Владивосток: Дальнаука, 2014. — 408 с. + цв. вкл. — (Объем: 54 п.л.) ISBN 978-5-8044-1460-4
- Авилов Р. С., Аюшин Н. Б., Калинин В. И. Владивостокская крепость: войска, фортификация, события, люди. Часть III. «Крепость трех измерений». Владивосток: Дальнаука, 2016.— 518 с. — (Объем: 65 п.л.) ISBN 978-5-8044-1584-7
