= 2nd Grenadier Division (Russian Empire) =

- Active: 1812 - 1917
- Allegiance: Russian Empire
- Branch: Imperial Russian Army
- Engagements: French invasion of Russia; War of the Sixth Coalition

The 2nd Grenadier Division was an infantry unit in the Imperial Russian Army as part of the Grenadier Corps. Its headquarters was located at Moscow. Notable engagements of the division include the French invasion of Russia.

== Organization ==
=== 1812 ===
- 1st Brigade
  - Kiev Grenadier Regiment
  - Moscow Grenadier Regiment
- 2nd Brigade
  - Astrakhan Grenadier Regiment
  - Fanagoria Grenadier Regiment
- 3rd Brigade
  - Siberian Grenadier Regiment
  - The Little Russian Grenadier Regiment
- 2nd Artillery Brigade

=== 1914 ===
- 1st Grenadier Brigade (Moscow)
  - The 5th Grenadier General of Kiev, Field Marshal Prince Nikolay Repnin, now EVI V. Heir of the Tsesarevich Regiment
  - 6th Grenadier General-Field Marshal of the Grand Duke Mikhail Nikolayevich regiment
- 2nd Grenadier Brigade (Moscow)
  - The 7th Grenadier of the Samogit General-Adjutant Count Totleben regiment
  - 8th Grenadier Moscow Grand Duke of Mecklenburg-Schwerin Frederick Regiment
- 2nd Grenadier Artillery Brigade ( Pavlovskaya Sloboda )

== Division Command ==
=== Chiefs of the division ===
- 1812 - Major-General Prince of Mecklenburg-Schwerin, Karl August Christian
- 1813 - Major-General Pisarev, Alexander Alexandrovich
- 01.1814 - 1817 - Lieutenant-General Ivan Paskevich
- 14.11.1817 - September 8, 1823 - Lieutenant-General Shakhovskoy, Ivan Leontievich
- 06.01.1826 - Major-General (since 22.08.1826 Lieutenant-General) Poluektov, Boris Vladimirovich
- until 08.12.1837 - Lieutenant-General Poleshko, Stepan Grigorievich
- 12/30/1837 - 12/10/1840 - Lieutenant-General Rozen, Roman Fedorovich
- 12.10.1840 - 19.12.1843 - Lieutenant-General Shulgin, Dmitry Ivanovich
- 19.12.1843 - until 18.01.1849 - Major-General (then Lieutenant-General) Frederiks, Alexander Andreevich
- 01/18/1849 - 1856 - Lieutenant-General Zherkov, Alexander Vasilyevich
- 08.09.1856 - 1863 - Lieutenant-General Voelkner, Vladimir Ivanovich
- 10.1863 - 01.1864 - Lieutenant-General Bel'gard, Valerian Alexandrovich
- 18.03.1864 - 30.08.1869 - Lieutenant-General, Adjutant-General von Patkul, Alexander Vladimirovich
- 11/06/1986 - June 14, 1872 - Lieutenant-General Apostol Kostanda
- 1876? - 14.12.1877 - Lieutenant-General Svechin, Vladimir Konstantinovich
- 14.12.1877 - 1878 - Lieutenant General Cvetzinsky, Adam Ignatievich
- 1880 - 1886 - Lieutenant General Tsege-von-Manteuffel, Nikolai Maksimovich
- 19.10.1886 - 07/21/1984 - Lieutenant-General Pavel Grigorievich Dukmasov
- 08/02/1984 - May 31, 1889 - Lieutenant-General Kvitsinsky, Iosif Ignaty Onufrievich
- 09.07.1898 - 07.01.1906 - Lieutenant-General Buturlin, Sergey Sergeevich
- 09.01.1906 - June 27, 1906 - Major-General Stolitsa, Evgeny Mikhailovich
- 04.07.1906 - 29.12.1908 - Lieutenant-General Ignatiev, Lev Ivanovich
- 29.12.1908 - 26.04.1911 - Lieutenant-General Arkady Nikanorovich Nishenkov
- 05/01/1911 - 09/12/1915 - Lieutenant-General Stavrovich, Nikolai Grigorievich
- 09.12.1915 - 23.06.1917 - Major-General Sklyarevsky, Vasily Epifanovich
- 06/23/1917-? - Major-General Dovgird, Stefan Antonovich

=== Heads of division headquarters ===
- 14.04.1868 - 12.04.1872 - Colonel von der Launitz, Mikhail Vasilyevich
- 12.02.1876 - 09.05.1881 - Colonel Golovin, Mikhail Ivanovich
- хх.хх.1881 - хх.хх.1885 - Colonel Verigin, Evgeny Alexandrovich
- 05/28/1885 - 02/07/1982 - Colonel Volkov, Vladimir Sergeevich
- 10.05.1892 - 27.10.1893 - Colonel Polyakov, Vladimir Alekseevich
- 10/27/1983 - 11/12/1987 - Colonel Petrov, Alexander Konstantinovich
- 11/15/1977 - 02/02/1901 - Colonel Kyprian Kandratovich
- 25.02.1901 - 12.08.1902 - Colonel Malinka, Vladimir Ivanovich
- 08/22/1902 - June 1, 1904 - Colonel Russian, Mikhail Alexandrovich
- 06/22/1904 - 05/28/1907 - Colonel von Colen, Constantine Konstantinovich
- 21.06.1907 - 02.11.1911 - Colonel Staev, Pavel Stepanovich
- 02.11.1911 - 31.03.1913 - Colonel Grishinsky, Alexey Samoilovich
- 27.04.1913 - 20.12.1914 - Colonel Dreving, Pyotr Fedorovich
- 20.12.1914 - 16.09.1915 - Colonel Sukhodolsky, Vyacheslav Vladimirovich
- 10/20/1915 - 1917 - Lieutenant Colonel (since 08/08/1916 Colonel) Lukyanov, Grigory Lukich

=== The commanders of the 1st Brigade ===
- until 26.08.1812 - Colonel Shatilov, Ivan Yakovlevich
- after 26.08.1812 - Major Kononenko, Andrei Nikiforovich
- 10/01/1814 - 01/31/1817 - Major-General Nikolai Sulima
- 08/15/1832 - 02/04/1833 - Major-General Alexander von Moller
- up. 1840 - April 17, 1844 - Major-General Skobeltsyn, Nikolai Nikolaevich
- 17.04.1844 - 20.02.1846 - Major-General Smitten, Alexander Evstafievich
- 03.03.1846 - 11.05.1854 - Major-General Friedrichs, Alexander Karlovich
- 1873 - 12.04.1878 - Major-General Tsege-von-Manteuffel, Nikolai Maksimovich
- 24.05.1878 - 26.03.1882 - Major-General Plaksin, Vadim Vasilyevich
- 03/26/1882 - August 28, 1886 - Major-General Molsky, Vitaly Konstantinovich
- 09/22/1886 - February 20, 1889 - Major-General Tugengold, Alexander Vasilyevich
- 02/20/1889 - May 27, 1811. - Major General Aleksandr Fyodorovich Rittikh
- 07/02/1981 - 02/14/1984 - Major-General Bibikov, Mikhail Ilyich
- 16.02.1894 - 18.11.1895 - Major-General Lyapunov, Alexander Yakovlevich
- 11/30/1989 - 13.09.1899 - Major-General Mikhail Zasulich
- 31.10.1899 - December 28, 1904 - Major-General Stolitsa, Evgeny Mikhailovich
- 14.01.1905 - 27.03.1907 - Major-General Khodnev, Ivan Dmitrievich
- 28.03.1907 - 31.12.1913 - Major-General Mikhno, Sergey Dmitrievich
- 12/31/1913 - 03/05/1914 - Major-General Chaplygin, Alexander Ivanovich
- 08.06.1914 - 29.07.1914 - Major-General Saychuk, Afanasy Semenovich

=== The commanders of the 2nd Brigade ===
- until 26.08.1812 - Colonel Buksgewden, Ivan Filippovich
- after 26.08.1812 - Major Mikhail Zasulich
- 09/11/1816-? - Major-General Krishtafovich, Yegor Konstantinovich
- 01.1825-03.1831 - Major-General Emma, Alexander Fedorovich
- 1850-1855 - Major-General Ivashintsev, Sergey Nikolaevich
- 27.05.1882-31.12.1892 - Major-General Lipinsky, Vasily Iosifovich
- 18.01.1893-10.02.1902 - Major-General Smirnsky, Konstantin Ivanovich
- 10.03.1902-28.04.1906 - Major-General Nikonov, Semyon Ivanovich
- 05.05.1906-09.11.1907 - Major-General Kaigorodov, Mikhail Nikiforovich
- 28.11.1907-30.01.1915 - Major-General Malinka, Vladimir Ivanovich
- 03.02.1915-07.04.1917 - Major-General Lesnevsky, Iosif Vikentevich
- 05.05.1917-08.10.1917 - Major-General Oleksander Osetsky

=== Commanders of the 3rd Brigade ===
- 1812 - Colonel Levin, Dmitry Andreevich
- Gartung, Nikolai Ivanovich
- 24.08.1824-02.08.1825 - Major-General Shulgin, Dmitry Ivanovich
- Major-General Skobelev, Ivan Nikitich

=== The commanders of the 2nd Grenadier Artillery Brigade ===
- 1881 - Major-General Michel, Yegor Yegorovich
- 02/27/1981 - 10/19/1982 - Major-General Sokolov, Leonid Alexandrovich
- 19.10.1892 - 29.10.1899 - Major-General Platonov, Leonid Nikolayevich
- 29.12.1899 - 27.02.1900 - Colonel (since 1.01.1900 Major-General with confirmation in his post) Ivanovsky
- 29.03.1900 - 27.09.1902 - Major-General Chersky, Vladimir Yakovlevich
- 10/03/1902 - 17.05.1906 - Major-General Glazenap, Georgy Alexandrovich
- 05/20/1906 - 12.09.1907 - Major-General Slyusarenko, Vladimir Alekseevich
- 12.09.1907 - 29.11.1908 - Major-General Tarkhov, Alexey Nikolaevich
- 17.12.1908 - 05.07.1910 - Major-General Petunin, Alexander Yakovlevich
- 07/25/1910 - 05/31/1912 - Major-General Semyonov, Alexander Ivanovich
- 05/31/1912 - 25.03.1944 - Major-General Davydov, Dmitry Alekseevich
- 09.04.1914 - 1915 - Major-General Kopestynsky, Ivan Grigorievich
- 15.01.1915 - 1917 - Major-General Sozanovich, Vladimir Fedorovich
