= His Imperial Majesty's Own Escort =

Personal escort of the Russian Tsar

His Majesty's Own Escort
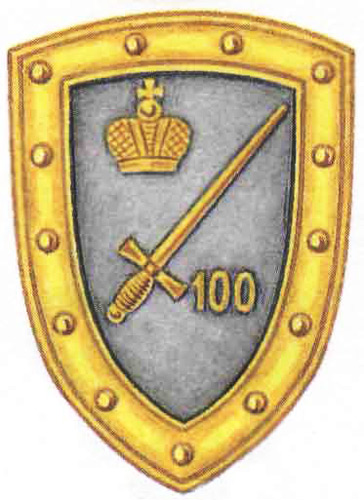
- Active: 1811–1917
- Country: Russian Empire
- Branch: Imperial Russian Army
- Type: Cavalry; Imperial guard
- Size: Regiment
- Garrison/HQ: Saint Petersburg

His Imperial Majesty's Own Escort (Russian: Собственный Его Императорского Величества Конвой, lit. 'His Imperial Majesty's Own Convoy') was a Russian Imperial Guard formation, created for the Emperor of All Russia. At the Battle of Leipzig in the Napoleonic Wars, soldiers from the regiment saved then Emperor Alexander I of Russia from being captured by French forces under Napoleon Bonaparte.

The core of the regiment consisted entirely of 200 Terek Cossacks and 200 Kuban Cossacks, with 200 men of each Cossack host in service, with the other 200 on military leave at any time. (Note: Петин, C (1892). Собственный Его Императорскаго Величества конвой. ISBN 551793823X.)

== History ==
Originally formed in 1811 during the Napoleonic Wars, the regiment served until shortly after the February Revolution and the overthrow of Nicholas II, at which time it was dissolved.

The Barracks of His Own Majesty's Cossack Escort was in Pushkin, St. Petersburg near the imperial residence of Tsarskoye Selo.

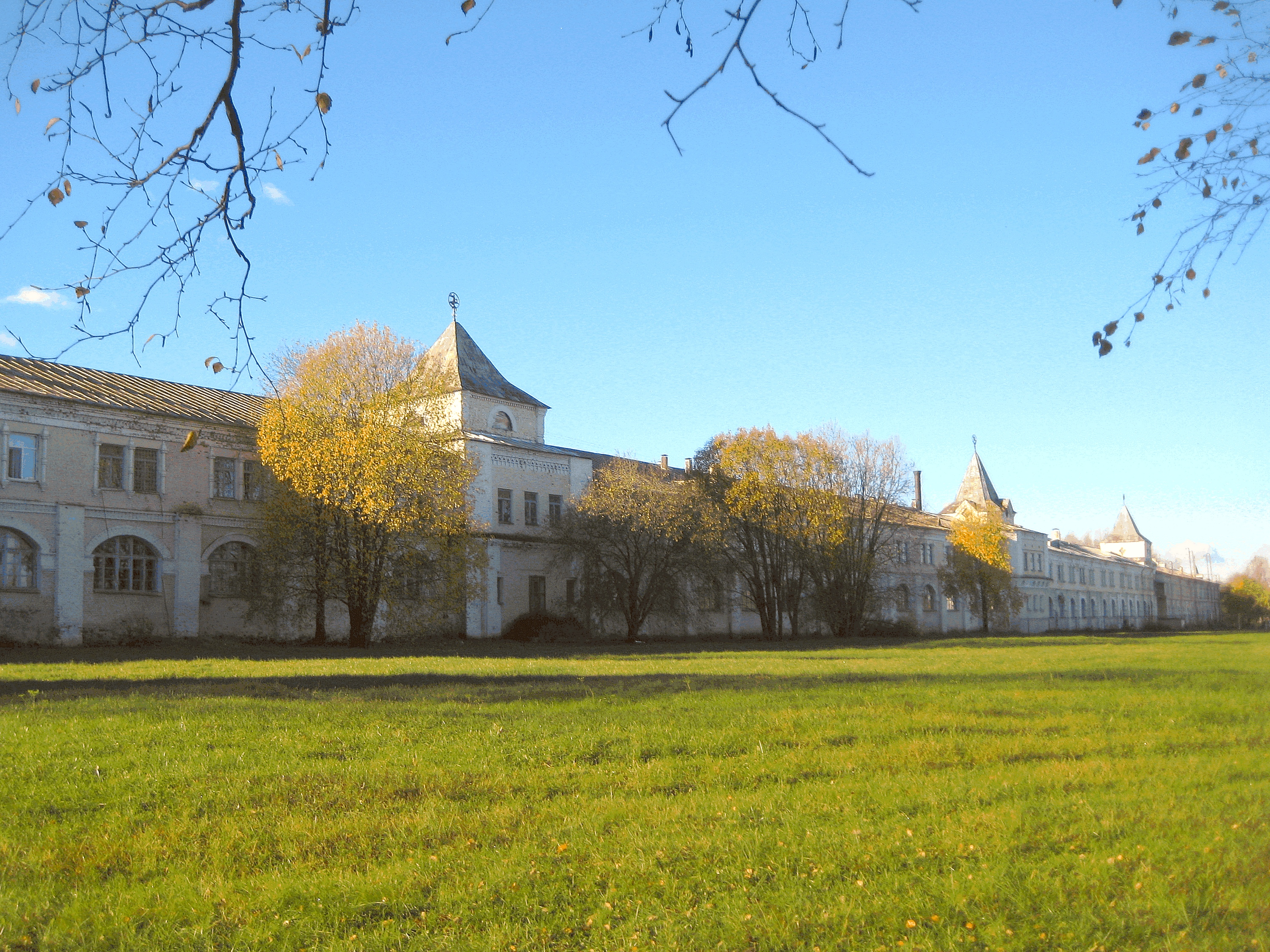
Barracks of His Own Imperial Majesty's Cossack Escort

== Commanders ==
- 26.08.1856–30.08.1858 – Flügeladjutant, prince Pyotr Romanovich Bagration
- 27.09.1858–08.03.1864 – Polkovnik (from 1860 — Major-General) Dmitri Ivanovich Skobelev
- 08.03.1864–24.05.1869 – Flügeladjutant, Polkovnik Sergei Alekseev Sheremetev
- 24.05.1869–13.08.1878 – Flügeladjutant, Polkovnik (from 17.10.1877 — Major-General of the Svita) Peter Alexandrovich Cherevin
- 13.08.1878–30.08.1887 – Flügeladjutant, Polkovnik Modest Alexandrovich Ivashkin-Potanoff
- 30.08.1887–17.02.1893 – Polkovnik (from 30.08.1891 — General-Major of the Svita) Vladimir Alekseevich Sheremetev
- 06.05.1893–12.06.1906 – Flügeladjutant, Polkovnik (from 1896 — Major-General of the Svita) baron Alexander Yegorovich Meiendorf
- 12.06.1906–01.01.1914 – Polkovnkik (from 31.05.1907 — Major-General of the Svita) prince Georgi Ivanovich Trubetskoy
- 02.01.1914–22.03.1917 – Major-General of the Svita, count Alexander Nikolaevich Grabbe
- 15.03.1917–30.03.1917 – Polkovnik Georgi Antonovich Rashpil

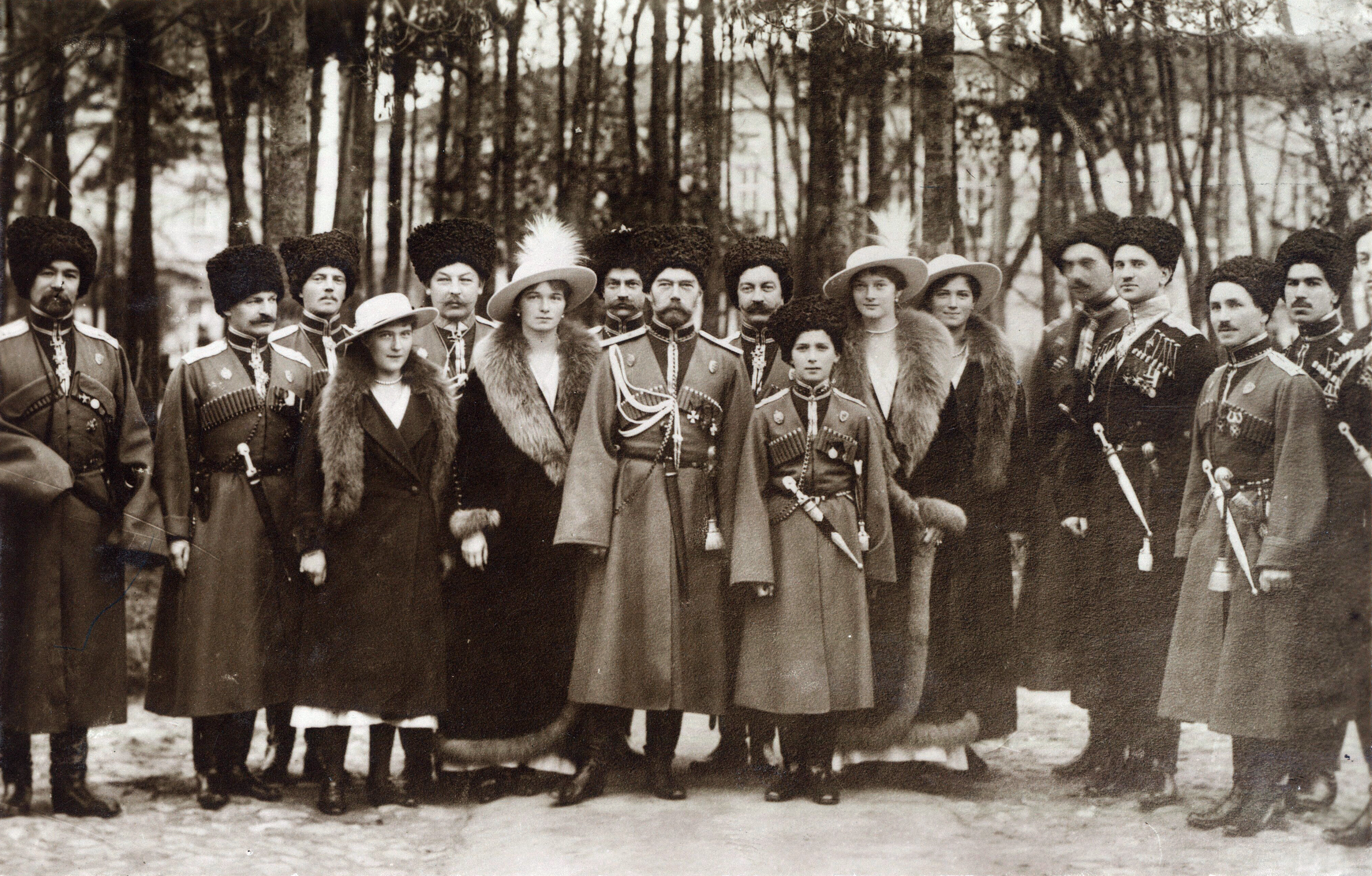
Widely distributed photograph of Nicholas II with members of the regiment in Kuban Cossack attire

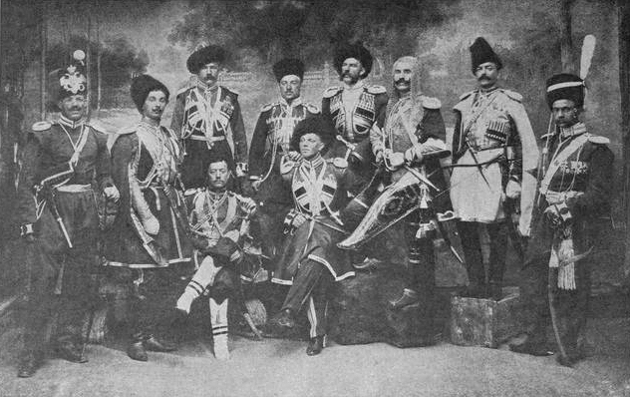
1911. Officers of His Majesty's Own Cossack Escort in period attire

== See also ==
- Russian Imperial Guard
- Imperial guard
