= Apostol Kostanda =

Imperial Russian division commander

Apostol Spiridonovich Kostanda
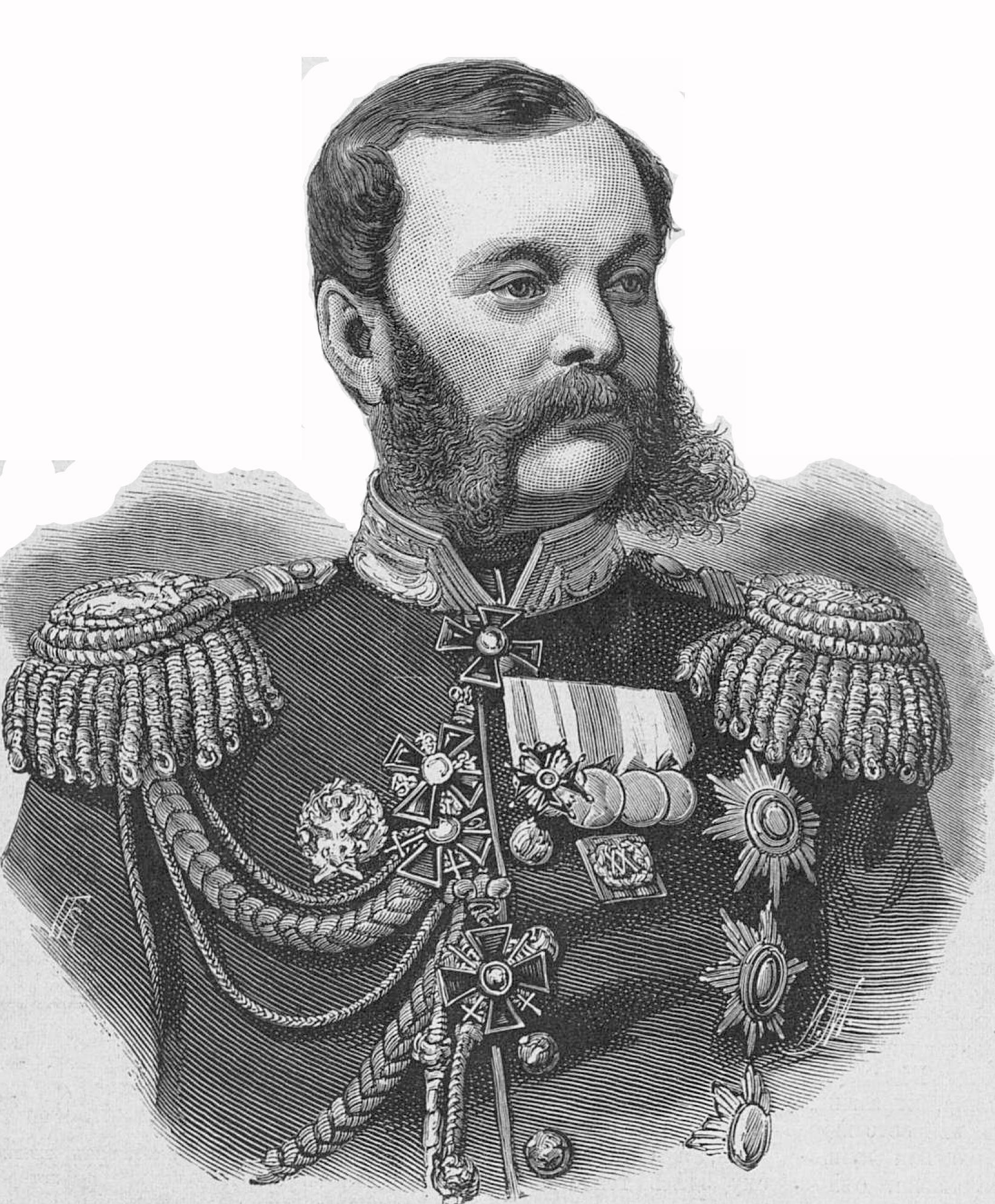
- Born: December 24, 1817
- Died: December 5, 1898
- Allegiance: Russian Empire
- Service / branch: Imperial Russian Army
- Commands: 8th Infantry Division; 5th Infantry Division; 2nd Grenadier Division; Moscow Military District
- Battles / wars: Crimean War; January Uprising

Apostol Spiridonovich Kostanda (December 24, 1817 – December 5, 1898) was an Imperial Russian division commander. He fought in wars in Crimea and Poland. He commanded the military forces in Moscow from 1888 to 1896.

== Awards ==
- Order of Saint Anna, 2nd class, 1854
- Order of Saint Vladimir, 4th class, 1854
- Gold Sword for Bravery, 1854
- Order of Saint Stanislaus (House of Romanov), 1st class, 1862
- Order of Saint Anna, 1st class, 1868
- Order of Saint Vladimir, 2nd class, 1870
- Order of the White Eagle (Russian Empire), 1873
- Order of Saint Alexander Nevsky, 1882
- Order of St. Andrew, 1896
- Order of Prince Danilo I

Preceded by	Commander of the 8th Infantry Division; 1863–1864	Succeeded by
Preceded by	Commander of the 5th Infantry Division; 1864–1869	Succeeded by
Preceded by	Commander of the 2nd Grenadier Division; 1869-1872	Succeeded by
