= Pyotr Romanovich Bagration =

Georgian general (1818–1876)

Piotr R. Bagration
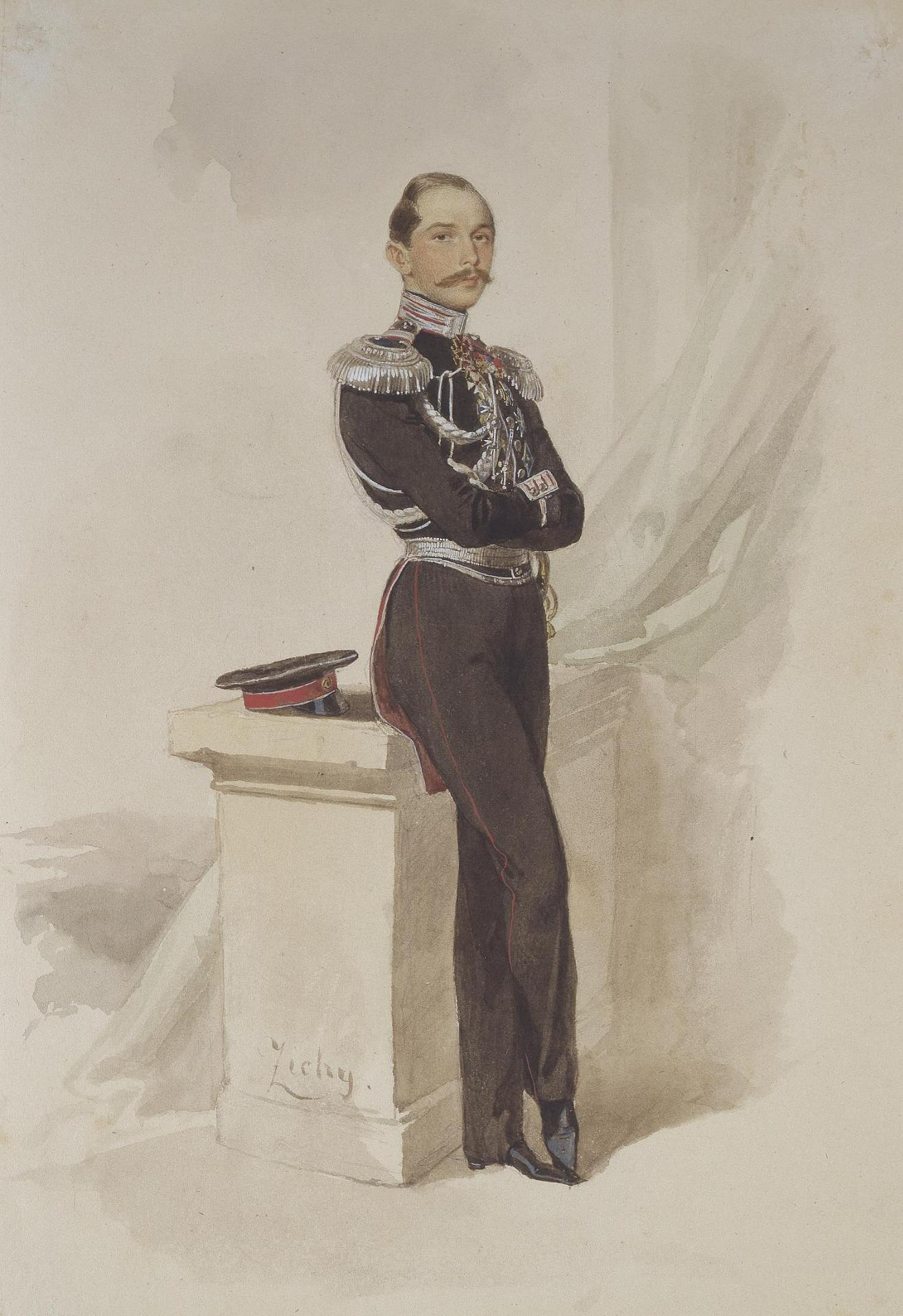
- Piotr R. Bagration
- Born: 24 September 1818
- Died: 17 January 1876 (aged 57); Saint Petersburg
- Military career
- Allegiance: Russian Empire
- Branch: Imperial Russian Army
- Rank: Lieutenant general
- Units: Imperial Guard
- Commands: His Majesty's Own Cossack Escort of the Russian Imperial Guard; Governor-general of the Tver Governorate (1862–1870); Governor-general of the Baltic governorates (1870–1876)

Prince Pyotr Romanovich Bagration (Russian: Пётр Рома́нович Багратио́н, Georgian: პეტრე რომანის (რევაზის) ძე ბაგრატიონი, romanized: p'et're romanis (revazis) dze bagrat'ioni; 24 September 1818 – 17 January 1876), the son of general Prince Roman Bagration, was a Russian-Georgian statesman, general and scientist who invented the first dry galvanic cell.

== Biography ==
A descendant of the Georgian royal Bagrationi dynasty, with Georgia already annexed by the Russian Empire at the death of King George XII Bagration of Georgia in 1801, successor of King Erekle II Bagration, (Georgian: ერეკლე II) (7 November 1720 or 7 October 1721 – 11 January 1798) reigning as the king of Kakheti from 1744 to 1762, and of Kartli and Kakheti from 1762 until 1798.

Both his father, Roman (Revaz) Bagrationi (1778 — Tiflis, 1834), and uncle, Pyotr Bagration (Kizlar, Dagestan, 1765 — Battle of Borodino, 1812), were famous Russian Army generals.

In 1840 Bagration graduated from the Military Academy in St.Petersburg, Russia. The following year he started his lifelong research at the Scientific Laboratory of Physics of the St.Petersburg Academy of Sciences (now Russian Academy of Sciences), under Prussian-Russian Academician Moritz von Jacobi, Moritz Hermann von Jacobi, Boris Semyonovich von Jacobi (Russian: Борис Семёнович (Морис-Герман) Якоби) (21 September 1801 – 10 March 1874).

He was awarded the Prize of the Petersburg Academy of Sciences in 1850, and received the rank of Lieutenant-General in 1865.

In 1862 Bagration was made the Governor of Tver Governorate, and from 1870 until his death he was the Governor-General of the Baltic governorates (Courland, Livonia and Estonia). He was awarded the Order of St. Vladimir, 2nd degree (in 1868), the Order of the White Eagle (in 1869) and the Order of St. Alexander Nevsky (in 1872).

Bagration died in Saint Petersburg on 17 January 1876.

== Scientific work ==
Bagration created the first dry galvanic cell in 1843 and published a monograph about it in 1845. In other works he examined the reactions occurring in the galvanic cell and in galvanoplastics. In 1843 he performed gold electroplating in the presence of Moritz von Jacobi, the original inventor of electroplating and galvanoplastics.

In 1845 Bagration was sent by the Petersburg Academy of Sciences to Germany, France and England. He studied the solubility of metallic gold, silver and copper in aqueous solutions of cyanide compounds and was the first to discover the Elsner´s Equation, the stoichiometry of gold cyanidation.

In 1847 Bagration discovered a sorosilicate rich in rare earths which was named "Bagrationite" in his honour, but it had already been described as allanite (or orthite).

== Family ==
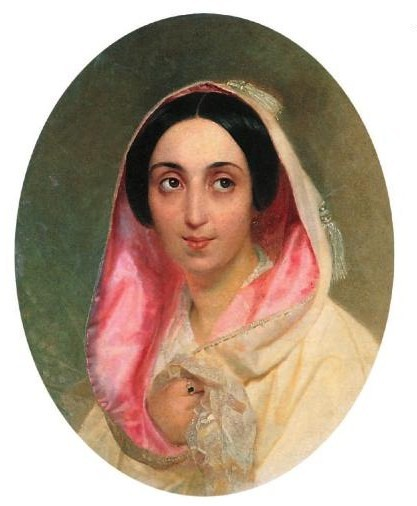
Princess Anna Bragration, portrait by Karl Bryullov (1849)

Prince Bagration was married to Anna Alekseyevna Martynova (1824–1885) and had twin daughters:

- Yevgenia (1846–1903), fraulein of the Imperial Court
- Yelizaveta (1846–1868)
