= Kazimir Vasilevich Levitsky =

Imperial Russian general and division commander

Kazimir Vasilyevich Levitsky
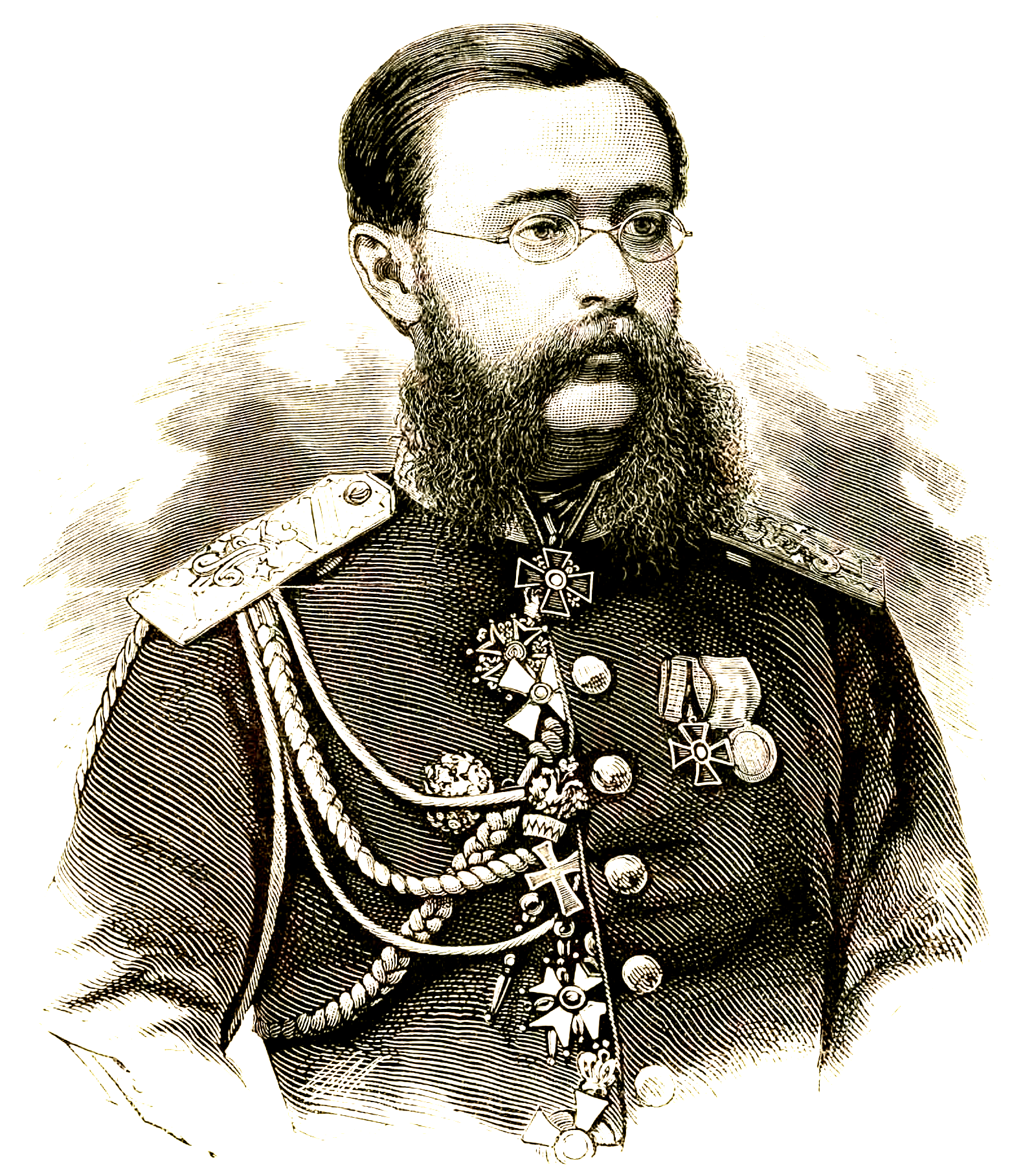
- Born: February 1835
- Died: November 22, 1890 (aged 55)
- Allegiance: Russian Empire
- Branch: Imperial Russian Army
- Rank: lieutenant general
- Commands: 1st Cavalry Division
- Conflicts: Russo-Turkish War

Kazimir Vasilyevich Levitsky (February 1835 – November 22, 1890) was an Imperial Russian general and division commander. He took part in the war against the Ottoman Empire.

== Awards ==
- Order of Saint George, 4th degree, 1877
- Order of Saint Stanislaus (House of Romanov), 1st class, 1877
- Order of Saint Anna, 1st class, 1878
- Order of Saint Vladimir, 2nd class, 1883
- Order of the White Eagle (Russian Empire)

| Preceded by | Chief of Staff of the 2nd Guards Cavalry Division; 1866-1875 | Succeeded by |
| Preceded by | Commander of the 1st Cavalry Division; 1885–1888 | Succeeded by |

== Sources ==
- Некрологи: «Новости», 1890 г., No. 1890; «Новое время», 1890 г., No. 5295.
- Витмер А. Н. Генерал Левицкий. СПб., 1912.
- Под ред. В. Ф. Новицкого и др (ed.), "14", Военная энциклопедия, Saint Petersburg: т-во И. В. Сытина
- Газенкампф М. А. Мой дневник 1877—78 гг. СПб., 1907.
- Гейсман П. А. Генерал К. В. Левицкий в 1877—78 гг. // «Русский инвалид», 1913, No. 134.
- Глиноецкий Н. П. Исторический очерк Николаевской академии Генерального штаба. СПб., 1882
- М. Г. Генерал-лейтенант К. В. Левицкий // «Нива», 1891, No. 4.
- Милорадович Г. А. Список лиц свиты их величеств с царствования императора Петра I по 1886 год. СПб., 1886
- Развёртка шаблонов // Русский биографический словарь : в 25 томах. — Санкт-Петербур—Москва, 1896–1918.
- Список генералам по старшинству на 1886 год
