= Vladimir Gorbatovsky =

General of Russian Imperial Army (1851–1924)

Vladimir Nikolayevich Gorbatovsky
- Владимир Николаевич Горбатовский
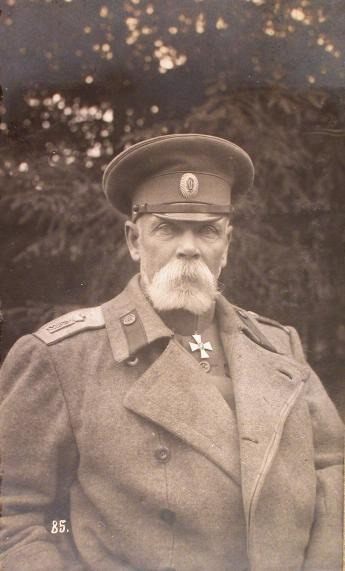
- Born: 7 June [O.S. 26 May] 1851
- Died: 30 July 1924 (aged 73); Reval, Estonia
- Burial place: Alexander Nevsky Cemetery
- Military career
- Allegiance: Russian Empire
- Branch: Imperial Russian Army
- Commands: 2nd Brigade, 1st Grenadier Division; 3rd Grenadier Division; 19th Army Corps; 6th Army; 10th Army
- Conflicts: Russo-Turkish War; Russo-Japanese War; Siege of Port Arthur; World War I; Lake Naroch offensive; Russian Civil War
- Awards: Order of St. George IV degree Order of St. George III degree Order of St. Vladimir II degree Order of St. Stanislav II degree Order of St. Stanislav I degree Order of St. Anne III degree Order of St. Anne I degree

Vladimir Nikolayevich Gorbatovsky (Russian: Влади́мир Никола́евич Горбато́вский; 7 June [O.S. 26 May] 1851 – 30 July 1924) was an Imperial Russian army commander. He fought in the wars against the Ottoman Empire and the Empire of Japan.

Gorbatovsky commanded the Twelfth Army during the Lake Naroch offensive.

He died of illness in Reval, Estonia. He is buried at the Alexander Nevsky Cemetery.

== Awards ==
- Order of Saint Stanislaus (House of Romanov), 3rd class, 1876
- Order of Saint Anna, 3rd class, 1878
- Order of Saint Stanislaus (House of Romanov), 2nd class, 1879
- Order of Saint Anna, 2nd class, 1883
- Order of Saint Vladimir, 4th class, 1888
- Order of Saint Vladimir, 3rd class, 1896
- Order of Saint Anna, 1st class, 1904
- Order of Saint Stanislaus (House of Romanov), 1st class, 1904
- Order of Saint George, 4th degree, 1904
- Order of Saint Vladimir, 2nd class, 1905
- Order of the White Eagle (Russian Empire), 1911
- Order of Saint George, 3rd degree (September 28, 1914)

Preceded by	Commander of the 2nd Brigade, 1st Grenadier Division; 1905	Succeeded by
Preceded by	Commander of the 3rd Grenadier Division; 1909–1914	Succeeded by
Preceded by Evgraf Saranchov	Commander of the 19th Army Corps; 1914–1915	Succeeded by Anthony Veselovsky
Preceded by Aleksiej Czurin	Commander of the 6th Army; 20 March – 12 December 1916	Succeeded by Afanasy Curikov
Preceded by Afanasy Tsurikov	Commander of the 10th Army; 12 December 1916 – 1 April 1917	Succeeded by Nikolai Kiselevsky
