= Grenadier Corps =

- Active: 29 August 1814; 1914
- Allegiance: Russian Empire
- Branch: Imperial Russian Army
- Type: Grenadier

Grenadier Corps (Russian: Гренадерский корпус) was a Grenadier unit of the Imperial Russian Army. It was headquartered in Moscow. The corps was formed on August 29, 1814, consisting of the 1st, 2nd and 3rd grenadier divisions. It was a military tactical and administrative unit, which included all types of weapons.

== History ==
Grenadier units from selected military personnel were formed in the Russian army under Peter the Great in guards and army infantry regiments in the form of separate companies and in the form of grenadier units. Separate grenadier companies were retained in the Imperial Russian Army until 1856. In Russian Jaeger regiments, they were called carabinier companies.

In 1763, the Russian army already had four army grenadier regiments. The number of army grenadier regiments gradually increased due to the renaming of musketeer regiments and the formation of new grenadier regiments by selecting personnel from infantry regiments.

In 1811, the grenadier regiments were united into special grenadier divisions, and in 1814 - into the Grenadier Corps. Another source states that in August 1813, the 3rd Grenadier Corps was formed by renaming the 1st Infantry Corps. The corps included the 1st and 2nd Grenadier Divisions. The corps commander was Lieutenant General (from October 8, 1813, General of Cavalry) Nikolay Raevsky. On April 3, 1814, the 3rd Grenadier Division joined the corps, and on August 29, 1814, it was renamed the Grenadier Corps. In May 1813, Raevsky's grenadiers distinguished themselves in the battles of Königswartha and Bautzen. In August, after Austria joined the anti-French coalition, Raevsky's corps was transferred to the Bohemian Army of Field Marshal Karl Philipp, Prince of Schwarzenberg. As part of it, the corps took part in the battles of Dresden, which was unsuccessful for the allied army, and near Kulm, where the French suffered a complete defeat. The corps and its divisions also participated with distinction in the War of the Sixth Coalition.

The Grenadier Corps under the command of Raevsky especially distinguished itself in the largest battle of that era - the "Battle of the Nations" near Leipzig.

In 1830–1831, the corps participated in the suppression of the November Uprising, in particular, in the battles of Białołęka, Grochów, Ostrołęka and the storming of Warsaw. In 1833, it was renamed the Separate Grenadier Corps. In 1834, the Grenadier Rifle Battalion was formed for the Grenadier Corps. In 1844, the formation returned to its previous name - the Grenadier Corps. From February 3, 1844, to 1856, it was subordinate to the commander of the Separate Guards Corps, the headquarters of the Separate Guards Corps was reorganized into the Headquarters of the Commander-in-Chief of the Guards and Grenadier Corps, and from 1849 — the Headquarters of the Commander-in-Chief of the Guards and Grenadier Corps. In the period 1856–1857, the grenadier regiments of the corps were granted new banners. Three corps: Grenadier, Guards Infantry and Guards Cavalry, during the Crimean War, were in Saint Petersburg and its environs and were intended to defend the capital of the state. Later, during the Crimean War, the Grenadier Corps was transferred to the north of Crimea. During the peasant unrest of 1857–1863, the corps restored order in the territories of the provinces of Russia. With the introduction of military district administration in 1862, the gradual abolition of all corps in the Imperial Russian Army began, which was completed in 1864. Between January 13, 1864, and February 19, 1877, the Grenadier Corps was abolished.

It was re-formed at the beginning of the Russo-Turkish War, in which it took part. It became famous in the battle of Plevna, where it withstood the main attack of the besieged army of Osman Pasha during its attempt to break out of the besieged fortress and, together with other corps that arrived in time, forced it to capitulate. The losses of the Grenadier Corps in this battle amounted to 1,609 people killed and wounded - 63 officers and 1,546 lower ranks.

In 1883, on the site of the hut where the Council at Fili had been held that had burned down in 1868, officers of the Grenadier Corps erected a monument in the form of a milestone in memory of this event.

Before the start of World War I, it was stationed in the Moscow Military District.

By August 5, 1914, the corps was part of the 4th Army and was part of the Southwestern Front.

The Grenadier Corps had little luck in this war. First of all, it was unlucky with its commanders. Its remarkable deed was the repulse, together with the Guards Cavalry, of the 2nd Austro-Hungarian Army from Petrokov in November.
