= 75th Infantry Division (Russian Empire) =

- 75-я пехотная дивизия
- Active: 1914–1918
- Country: Russian Empire
- Branch: Russian Imperial Army
- Role: Infantry
- Engagements: World War I; Battle of the Vistula River

The 75th Infantry Division (Russian: 75-я пехотная дивизия, 75-ya Pekhotnaya Diviziya) was an infantry formation of the Russian Imperial Army.

== Organization ==
- 1st Brigade
  - 297th Infantry Regiment
  - 298th Infantry Regiment
- 2nd Brigade
  - 299th Infantry Regiment
  - 300th Infantry Regiment
