= Alexander Samsonov =

Russian general (1859–1914)

Aleksandr Vasilyevich Samsonov
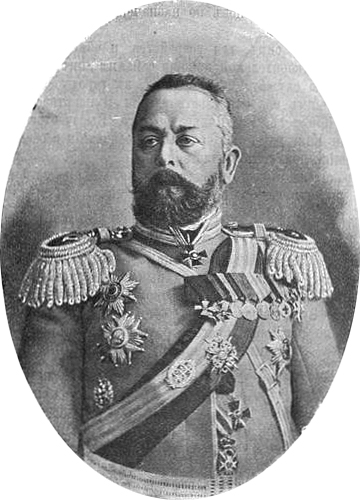
- Born: 14 November 1859; Andreevka, Kherson Governorate, Russian Empire
- Died: 30 August 1914 (aged 54) near Försterei Karolinenhof, Willenberg, East Prussia (now Karolinka Forestry near Wielbark, Poland)
- Cause of death: Suicide
- Military career
- Allegiance: Russian Empire
- Branch: (Russian Empire) Imperial Russian Army
- Service years: 1877–1914
- Rank: General of the Cavalry
- Commands: Warsaw Military District (1906–?); Second Army (1914)
- Conflicts: Boxer Rebellion; Russo-Japanese War; Battle of Mukden; World War I; Battle of Tannenberg †
- Awards: See Honours

Alexander or Aleksandr Vasilyevich Samsonov (Russian: Алекса́ндр Васи́льевич Самсо́нов; 14 November [O.S. 2 November] 1859 – 30 August [O.S. 17 August] 1914) was a career officer in the cavalry of the Imperial Russian Army and a general during the Russo-Japanese War and World War I. He was the commander of the Russian Second Army which was surrounded and defeated by the German Eighth Army in the Battle of Tannenberg, one of the early battles of World War I. Ashamed by his loss of the army, Samsonov committed suicide while retreating from the battlefield.

== Early military career ==
He was born in Kherson Governorate of the Russian Empire in what is now part of Ukraine. After graduation from the Vladimir of Kiev Cadet Corps and elite Nicholas Cavalry College, he joined the Imperial Russian Army at age 18 as a cornet in the 12th Hussars Regiment.

Samsonov fought in the Russo-Turkish War, 1877–78. After this war he attended the Nikolaevsky Military Academy in St. Petersburg. On November 4, 1888, he was appointed senior aide to the staff of the 20th Infantry Division, and from July 10, 1885, to February 4, 1889, served as Senior Staff Adjutant to the Caucasus Grenadier Division. From March 11, 1890, through July 26, 1896, he worked at various assignments at the Warsaw Military District. He subsequently became commandant of the Elisavetgrad Cavalry School. During the Boxer Rebellion (1900), Samsonov commanded a cavalry unit. During the Russo-Japanese War (1904–1905), Samsonov commanded a cavalry brigade of the Ussuri Siberian Cossack Division. He was promoted to command all Russian cavalry forces in the First Siberian Army Corps following the Russian defeat at the Battle of Telissu. His forces subsequently protected the Russian flanks at the Battle of Liaoyang. Through these conflicts Samsonov gained a reputation as an energetic and resourceful leader, but some observers criticized his strategic abilities. He had no command experience preparing him to command an army of thirteen divisions.

In 1906, Samsonov became Chief of staff of the Warsaw Military District, and in 1909 was Governor-General of Russian Turkestan and commander of the Turkestan Military District. He was also commander of the Semirechye Cossacks.

== The Great War ==
=== Command of the Russian Second Army ===
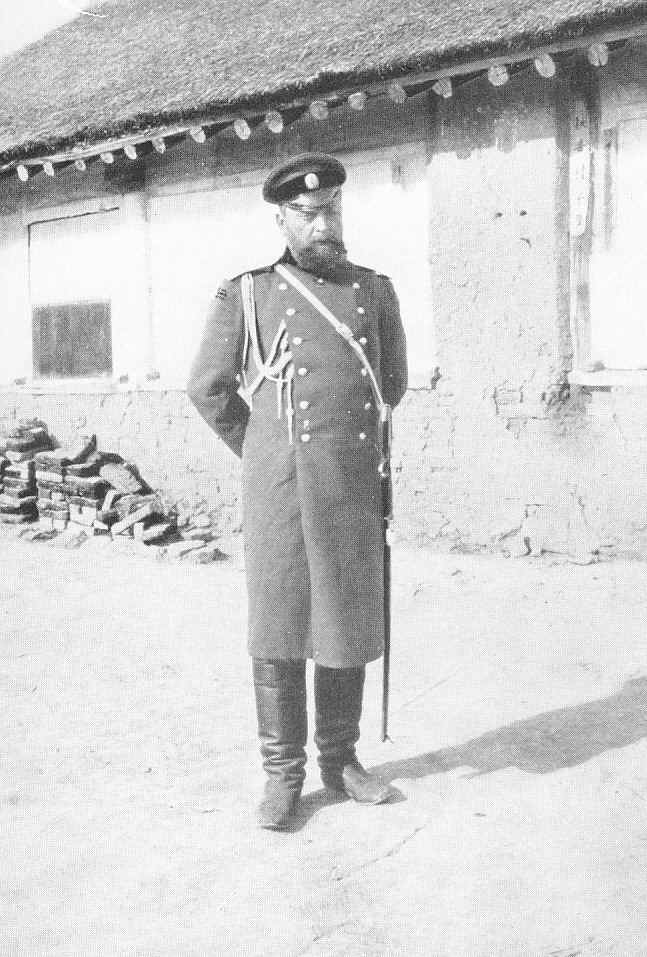
Samsonov at the outbreak of the war

At the start of World War I, Samsonov received the command of the Russian Second Army for the invasion of East Prussia, which was defended by the German Eighth Army under the command of General Maximilian von Prittwitz. Samsonov advanced slowly into the south-western corner of East Prussia, intending to link up with the Russian First Army, commanded by General Paul von Rennenkampf, which had started advancing into the north-east section of East Prussia. However, lack of communications between the two armies, and with the rear command of the Northwest Army Group, hindered co-ordination.

It is sometimes claimed that the poor coordination between Samsonov and Rennenkampf during the campaign was based on their personal antagonism towards each other. This antagonism is said to have been based on an incident after the Battle of Liaoyang during the Russo-Japanese War where Samsonov had publicly quarrelled with Rennenkampf on the landing platform of a railway station, and that the two were mutual lifetime enemies. However, the original source of this story is considered to be Max Hoffmann, at that time a colonel on the staff of the German Eighth Army. His claim of first hand knowledge of the disagreement is contradicted by the injuries to Rennenkampf at the time. Hoffman appears to have advanced this story during planning sessions, in support of his argument that Rennenkampf would not come to the aid of Samsonov. He argued that the German Eighth Army was free to use all of its forces in the attack on the Russian Second Army to their south, without fear of a counter-attack from their rear by the Russian First Army.

=== Battle of Tannenberg ===
Rennenkampf and the Russian First Army were the first to encounter the German Eighth Army, winning the Battle of Gumbinnen. The defeat led the German High Command to dismiss von Prittwitz and his chief of staff, replacing them with General (later Field Marshal) Paul von Hindenburg and General Erich Ludendorff. Hindenburg and Ludendorff arrived on the Eastern Front and decided to attack Samsonov's advancing forces with the full weight of the Eighth Army. Hindenburg and Ludendorff were strengthened in making this decision by intercepted Russian wireless communications, which indicated that Rennenkampf and the Russian First Army could not reach the proposed battle in time to be of assistance, and by an intercepted order from Samsonov, showing the movement of his forces. The armies made contact on August 22 and for six days the numerically superior Russians had some success. However, by August 29 the Germans had surrounded Samsonov's Second Army in the woods between Allenstein and Willenberg. The rout that followed was named the Battle of Tannenberg by Hindenburg, to compensate for a defeat of the Teutonic Knights by the Kingdom of Poland and the Grand Duchy of Lithuania near that location five centuries earlier.

=== Retreat and suicide ===
Samsonov attempted to retreat, but with his army now trapped in a German encirclement, the German forces killed or captured most of his troops. Only 10,000 of the 150,000 Russian soldiers managed to escape the encirclement. At least 92,000 Russian troops were taken prisoner, and between 300 and 500 Russian guns had been captured, out of the Second Army's initial total of some 600. Over 30,000 Russian soldiers were estimated dead or missing.

Samsonov and a small group of staff officers and men attempted to escape the encirclement, at first on horseback, and then on foot, over swampy ground, in the darkness of the night of August 29. Samsonov repeatedly was heard to say "The Tsar trusted me. How can I face him after such a disaster?" They reached the town of Willenberg late at night, but found it was held by the Germans. At approximately 1 a.m. on August 30, Samsonov slipped away from his party into the forest. A shot rang out. The Russians were not able to find his body in the darkness, but were eventually able to make their way to safety.

A German search party eventually found Samsonov's body in the adjacent forest, a bullet wound in his head and a revolver in his hand. The Germans buried Samsonov in Willenberg. In 1916, through the intercession of the International Red Cross, the Germans transferred his body to his widow, who was able to bury him in Russia.

== Honours ==
- Order of St. Anne, 4th degree (1877)
- Order of St. Stanislaus, 3rd degree (1880)
- Order of St. Anne, 3rd degree (1885)
- Order of St. Stanislaus, 2nd degree (1889)
- Order of St. Anne, 2nd degree (1892)
- Order of St Vladimir, 4th degree (1896)
- Order of St Vladimir, 3rd degree (1900)
- Order of St. Stanislaus, 1st degree with swords (1904)
- Order of St. Anne, 1st degree (1905)
- Golden Sword of St. George (1906)
- Order of St Vladimir, 2nd degree (1906)
- Order of St. George, 4th class (1907)
- Order of the White Eagle, with swords (1909)
- Order of St. Alexander Nevsky (1913)

== Bibliography ==
- Connaughton, R.M (1988). The War of the Rising Sun and the Tumbling Bear—A Military History of the Russo-Japanese War 1904–5, London, ISBN 0-415-00906-5.
- Jukes, Geoffry. The Russo-Japanese War 1904–1905. Osprey Essential Histories. (2002). ISBN 978-1-84176-446-7.
- Warner, Denis and Peggy. The Tide at Sunrise, A History of the Russo-Japanese War 1904–1905. (1975). ISBN 0-7146-5256-3.
