= Mohammad Taqi Mirza Rokn ed-Dowleh =

Iranian prince (d. 1901)

Mohammad Taqi Mirza
- Rokn ed-Dowleh
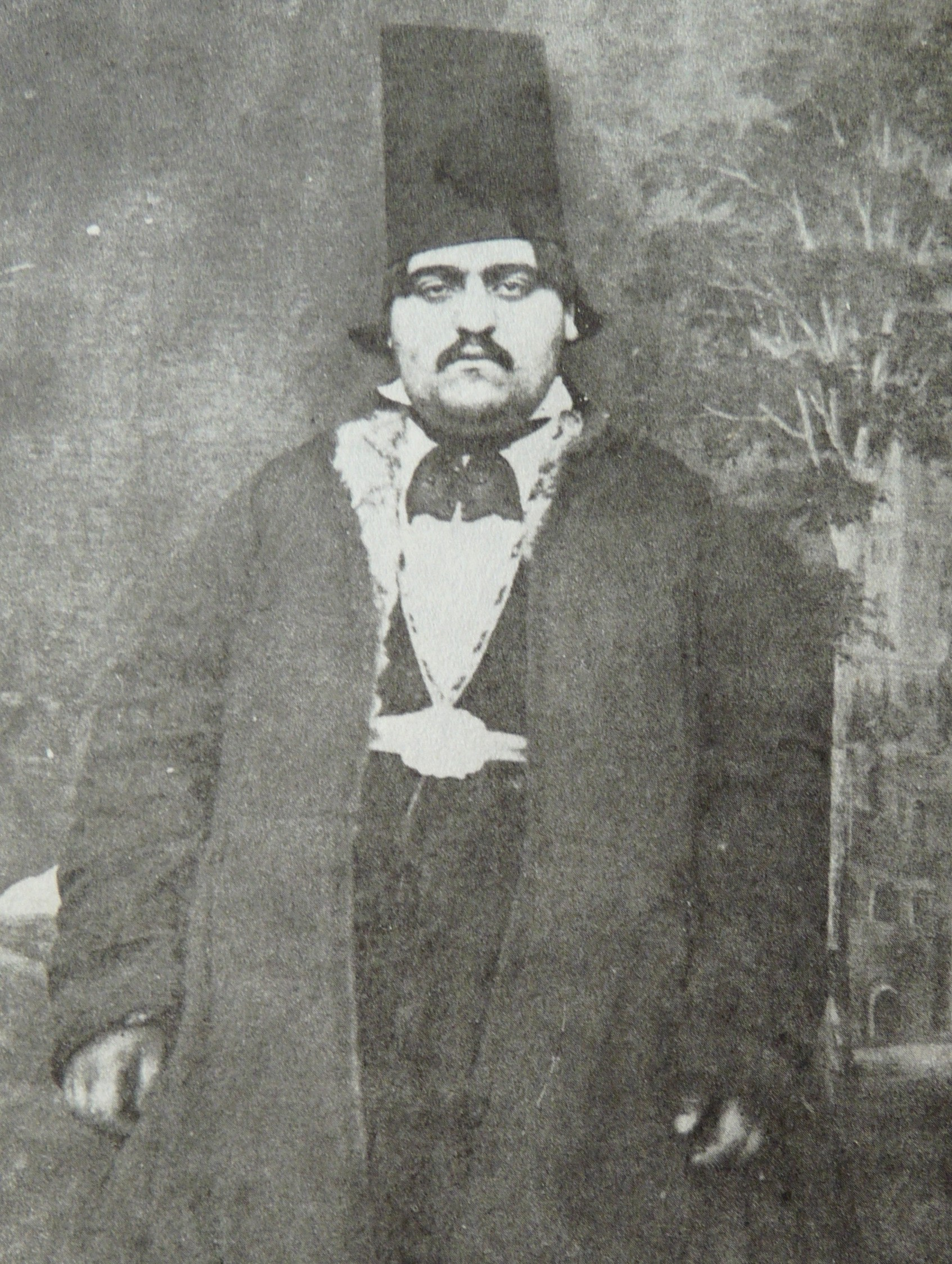
- Photograph of Rokn ed-Dowleh

Governor-General of Several provinces
- Tenure: 1856–1901
- Born: Tehran
- Died: 1901
- Dynasty: Qajar
- Father: Mohammad Shah Qajar
- Religion: Shia Islam

Mohammad Taqi Mirza Rokn ed-Dowleh (Persian: محمد تقی میرزا رکن‌الدوله) was an Iranian prince of the Qajar dynasty and third son of Mohammad Shah Qajar. He was also maternal grandfather of Gholam-Hossein Banan.

== Biography ==
He was born in Tehran to Mohammad Shah Qajar before 13 February 1842 (s/o a Zainab Khanum). In 1856, Mohammad Taqi was appointed governor of Tehran. In 1866, he was granted the title Rokn ed-Dowleh and appointed governor of Zanjan. In 1872, he was again appointed governor of Zanjan and in 1876 he was appointed governor of Khorasan. In 1880, he returned to Khorasan for a second term and was also appointed custodian of the Imam Reza shrine. However, the following year, after Mirza Hosein Khan Sepahsalar was appointed governor of province by royal decree, he returned to Tehran. Following Sepahsalar's death, he became governor of Khorasan for a third time.

Rokn ed-Dowleh remained governor of Fars until 1896. The following year, he was appointed governor of Khorasan, this he held until his death in 1901.

== Aftermath ==
Following Rokn ed-Dowleh's death, Mozaffar ad-Din Shah summoned his surviving family members to Tehran and conferred the title Rokn ed-Dowleh upon Ali-Naqi Mirza, eldest son of Mohammad Taqi Mirza. Following the compulsory adoption of surnames and abolition of honorific titles under Reza Shah, the descendants of Rokn ed-Dowleh adopted the surnames Rokni and Rokni Qajar.

== Government positions held ==
- Governor of Tehran 1856–1858
- Governor of Khamseh 1866–1867 and 1872–1873
- Governor of Zanjan 1876–1878
- Governor-general of Khorasan 1876, 1881, 1883–1884, 1887–1888 and 1897
- Governor-general of Fars 1892–1893 and 1894–1897
- Governor-general of Arabistan 1897–1901

== Source ==
- Moayyer ol-Mamalek, Dost-Ali (1982). رجال عصر ناصری [Notables of the Naseri Era] (in Persian). Tehran: Tarikh-e Iran.
- Sa'adat Nuri, Hoseyn (1967). "Rokn al-Dowleh-ha" [رکن‌الدوله‌ها]. Vahid (in Persian) (43).
- Oberling, Pierre (2017-06-26). The Qashqā'i Nomads of Fārs. Walter de Gruyter GmbH & Co KG. p. 108. ISBN 978-3-11-081930-4.
