= 1st Life Guards Rifle Regiment =

1st His Majesty's Life Guards Rifle Regiment
- Ле́йб-гва́рдии 1-й стрелко́вый Его́ Вели́чества по́лк
- Officers of the regiment in 1909
- Active: 1856–1918
- Country: Russian Empire
- Branch: Russian Imperial Army
- Role: Guards Infantry
- Garrison/HQ: St Petersburg; Tsarskoye Selo
- Patron: Alexander II; Alexander III; Nicholas II
- Anniversaries: April 17
- Engagements: January Uprising; Russo-Turkish War of 1877-78; World War I

The 1st His Majesty's Life Guards Rifle Regiment (Russian: Ле́йб-гва́рдии 1-й стрелко́вый Его́ Вели́чества по́лк) was a regiment of the Russian Imperial Guard that existed from 1856 prior to being dissolved in 1918 after World War I and the Russian Revolution. It was part of the 1st Guards Infantry Division, which itself was part of the Guards Corps.

== History ==
It was initially established on 27 March 1856 as the 1st His Majesty's Life Guards Rifle Battalion from several other regiments within the 1st Guards Infantry Division and the 2nd Guards Infantry Division, along with some other units. In 1863 the unit took part in quelling the Polish uprising and in 1870 became part of the newly formed Guards Rifle Brigade, under the command of Grand Duke Vladimir Alexandrovich. It later had the distinction of personally escorting Emperor Alexander II during the Russo-Turkish War of 1877-78. In 1910 it was raised from a battalion to a full regiment and in 1914, with the outbreak of World War I and the general mobilization, it received a reserve battalion. In 1917 it was renamed "1st Guards Rifle Regiment" and was completely dissolved in May 1918. Several of its members went on to fight in the White Army during the Russian Civil War. In 1951 an organization for veterans of the regiment was formed by some White émigrés.

== Patron ==
The patron of the 1st His Majesty's Life Guards Rifle Regiment was the reigning emperor.

- Alexander II (1856–1881)
- Alexander III (1881–1894)
- Nicholas II (1894–1917)

== Commanders ==
The list of battalion and regimental commanders.

- 27.03.1856 — 09.06.1857 Colonel Count Alexander Stroganov
- 30.08.1857 — 23.04.1861 Major General Duke Alexei Shakovsky
- 23.04.1861 — 25.05.1863 Major General Duke Alexander Rebinder
- 25.05.1863 — 27.11.1864 Major General Count Pavel Shuvalov
- 27.11.1864 — 14.12.1868 Colonel (then Major General) Alexander Gelfreich
- 14.12.1868 — 17.04.1874 Colonel Baron Karl-Vladimir Arpsgofen
- 17.04.1874 — 17.10.1877 Colonel Mikhail Ebeling
- 27.10.1877 — 12.02.1890 Colonel (then Major General) Georgy Vasmund
- 12.02.1890 — 17.02.1891 Major General Ivan Maltsov
- 17.02.1891 — 22.11.1893 Colonel Vladimir Glazov
- 22.11.1893 — 28.11.1895 Major General Andrei Chekmarev
- 28.11.1895 — 07.02.1901 Major General Alexander Ogaryov
- 06.10.1901 — 19.11.1905 Major General Duke Nikolai Trubetskoi
- 19.11.1905 — 04.12.1907 Major General Rozenshild von Paulin
- 04.12.1907 — 27.09.1914 Major General Pavel Nikolayev
- 29.09.1914 — 07.02.1917 Major General Ernest Levstrem
- 02.08.1917 — 27.10.1917 Colonel Sergei Kreiton
- 29.10.1917 — 20.12.1917 Colonel Georgy Bernikovsky
- 23.12.1917 — 01.03.1918 Colonel Kanushin
