= Volhynian Life Guards Regiment =

Volinsky Lifeguard Regiment — III —
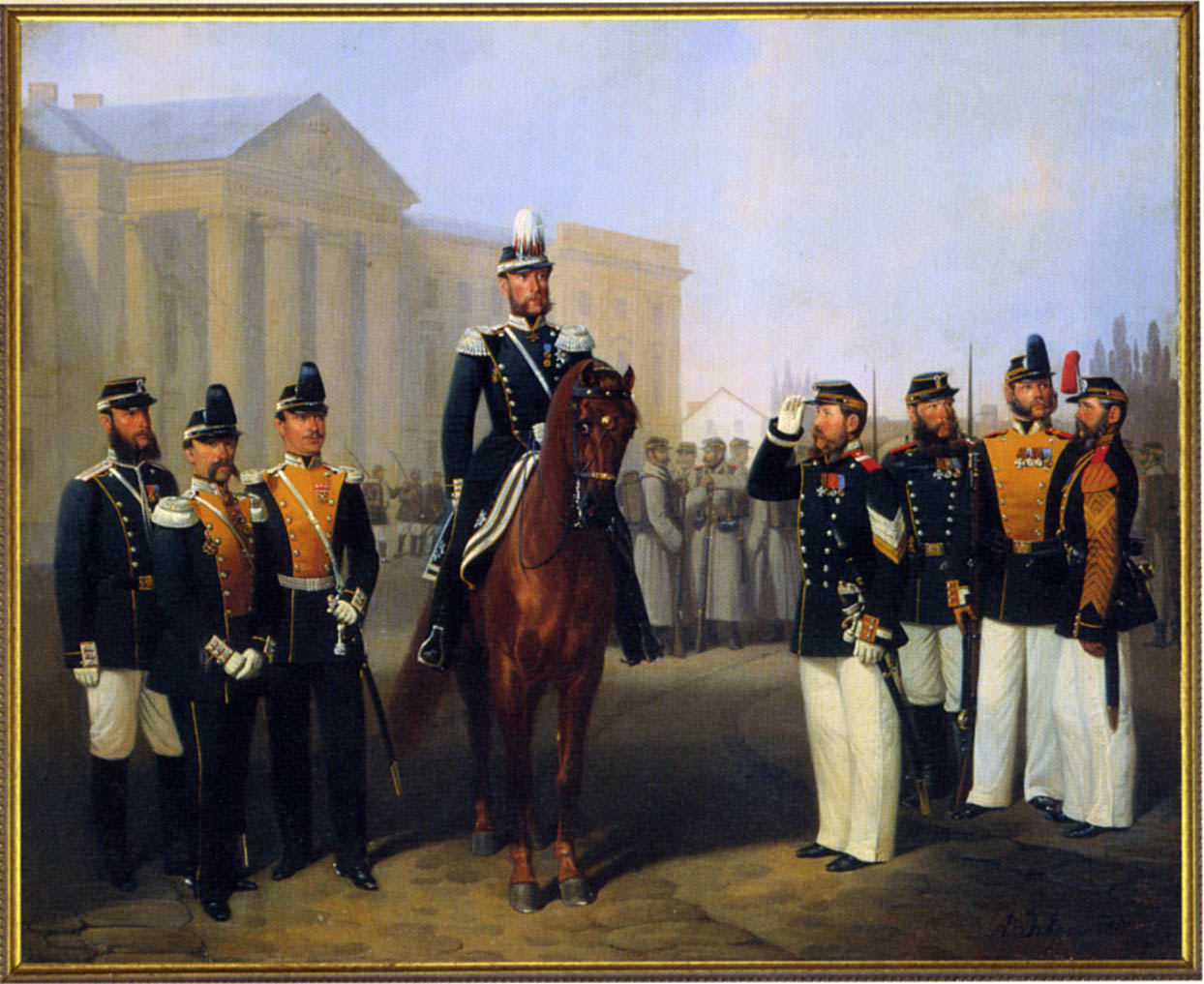
- Officers and soldiers of the Volinsky Regiment in Warsaw. 1864.
- Active: 1817–1917
- Country: Russian Empire
- Branch: Russian Imperial Guard
- Type: Infantry
- Size: Regiment
- Part of: 3rd Guard infantry division, XXIII Army Corps, Warsaw military district
- Garrison/HQ: Warsaw (1913)

Commanders
- Colonel-in-Chief: Grand Duke Nicholas Constantinovich (1856–1878)

Insignia
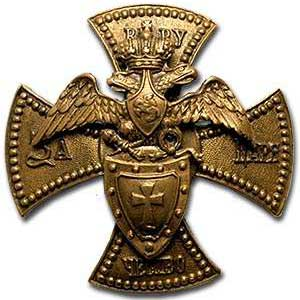
- Badge of the regiment

The Volinsky Lifeguard Regiment (Russian: Волынский лейб-гвардии полк), more correctly translated as the Volhynian Life-Guards Regiment, was a Russian Imperial Guard infantry regiment. Created out of a single battalion of Finnish Guard Regiment in 1817, the regiment took part in the Polish-Russian War of 1830–1831, the Crimean War, the January Uprising of 1863 and the First World War.

== History ==
Unlike many older units of the imperial Russian Army, the Volinsky Regiment neither was attached to nor originated from the land of Volhynia, after which it was named. Instead, it traced its roots to a single militia battalion formed by Grand Duke Constantine Pavlovich of Russia in Strelna on 12 December 1806 (Old Style). In the spring of the following year, the battalion took part in the Battle of Guttstadt-Deppen of the War of the Fourth Coalition. In 1807 it took part in the Battle of Friedland and in January of the following year was renamed His Majesty's Guards Militia Battalion and, in April, His Majesty's Finnish Battalion. Reinforced and reorganised, in October 1811 the battalion was enlarged to become the Guards Finnish Regiment of three infantry battalions. The first battalion, still including many veterans of the original militia unit, was then mentioned in dispatches for its role in the Battle of Leipzig. Having suffered heavy losses, the battalion was kept in Russian-occupied Warsaw throughout 1814.

On 12 October 1817 (Old Style), this battalion was reorganised as the Volinsky Guards Regiment (Russian: лейб-гвардии Волынский полк), composed of two battalions of light infantry. Its main task was to serve as a personal guard of Grand Duke Constantine Pavlovich and to counterbalance the forces of the Kingdom of Poland should they mutiny. Because the original battalion had taken part in much of the Napoleonic wars, the new regiment inherited the rights of the "Old Guard" and was included into the Guards Corps rather than the general army.

The regiment took active part in many battles of the November Uprising, notably in the Battle of Ostrołęka, fights in Lithuania, and the final battle for Warsaw. After the uprising, in 1832, the regiment was moved to Kronstadt, near the new Russian capital of St. Petersburg, and then in 1836 to Oranienbaum. It took part in the fights on secondary theatres of the Crimean War of 1853–1856, mostly guarding the shores of the Baltic Sea against Charles John Napier's Baltic blockade, and took part in a skirmish against a British boarding party at the port of Makslahti.

During the January Uprising, the regiment was moved back to Poland and attached to the 2nd Brigade, 3rd Guards Infantry Division. The regiment remained there until the outbreak of World War I. It took part in the failed Russian invasion of East Prussia as part of the XXIII Army Corps and in the inconclusive Battle of Łódź. In the summer of 1915, the regiment formed the core of General Vladimir Apollonovich Olokhov's ad-hoc Army Group unsuccessfully trying to cover the flanks of the 3rd and 8th Armies during the Gorlice–Tarnów Offensive.

Withdrawn from the front to Saint Petersburg, the soldiers of the regiment rebelled, killed their officers, and participated in the Bolshevik Revolution. The regiment remained in Petersburg until October, when it was disbanded and its men formed the core of the new local Red Army units.

== 1917 mutiny ==
On the morning of Sunday, 11 March 1917, Tsar Nicholas II had issued orders forbidding the populace from assembling in Petrograd. However, many people did and 200 were shot. When the Volinsky Regiment were ordered to fire at the unarmed crowd, they fired into the air. The next day, they killed their commander, Staff Captain Ivan Stepanovich Lashkevich and mutinied. They were followed by the Semyonovsky, the Izmaylovsky, the Lithuanian regiments, and even the legendary Preobrazhensky Regiment, the oldest and staunchest regiment founded by Peter the Great. The arsenal was pillaged, the Ministry of the Interior, Military Government building, police headquarters, the Law Courts and a score of police buildings were put to the torch. By noon the Peter and Paul Fortress with its heavy artillery was in the hands of the insurgents. By nightfall 60,000 soldiers had joined the revolution.

Order broke down and members of the Parliament (Duma) formed a provisional government to try to restore order, but it was impossible to turn the tide of revolutionary change. The Duma and the Soviet had already formed the nucleus of a provisional government and decided that Nicholas must abdicate. Faced with this demand, which was echoed by his generals, deprived of loyal troops, with his family in the hands of the Russian Provisional Government and fearful of unleashing civil war and opening the way for a German conquest, Nicholas had no choice but to submit. At the end of the "February Revolution" of 1917 (February in the Old Russian calendar), on 2 March (Julian Calendar)/ 15 March (Gregorian Calendar) 1917, Nicholas II abdicated.

== Gallery ==
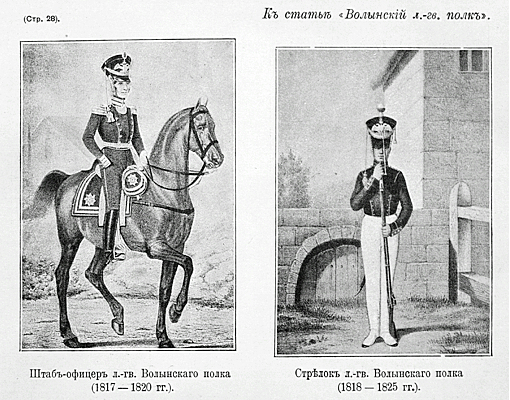
The Volinsky Regiment 1817–1820; 1818–1825

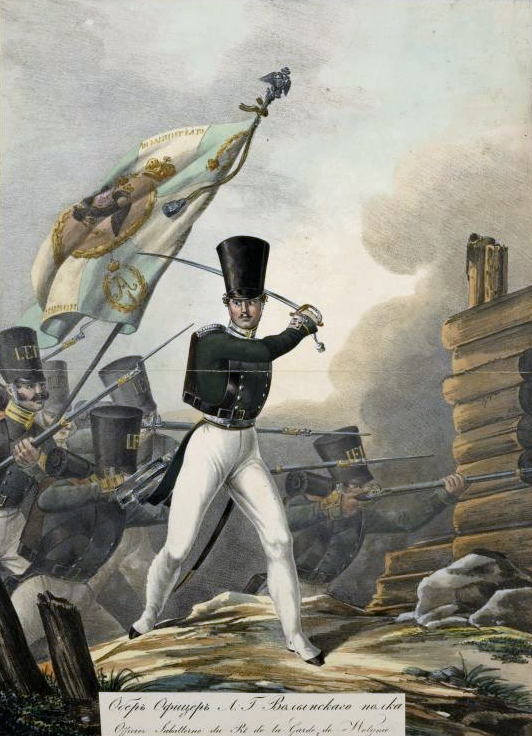
Officer of the Volinsky Regiment in Poland in 1830

== See also ==
- Russian Armed Forces

== Sources ==
- Gorokhoff, Gerard. Russian Imperial Guard. 2002.
- Handbook of the Russian Army 1914 by the British General Staff. Battery Press reprint edition, 1996.
