= Vladimir von Notbek =

- Born: July 9, 1865
- Died: 1921 (aged 55–56) Verkhneudinsk, Pribaikal'skaya Oblast, Far Eastern Republic
- Allegiance: Russian Empire; White movement
- Branch: Imperial Russian Army
- Commands: 1st Guards Infantry Division; 6th Army Corps; 1st Army
- Battles / wars: World War I Russian Civil War

Vladimir von Notbek (Russian, Владимир Владимирович Нотбек, July 9, 1865 – 1921) was an Imperial Russian army commander. As a captain by 1894, he served as a staff officer with the Russian Imperial Guard. After the October Revolution of 1917, he opposed the Bolsheviks. He died in what is now Ulan-Ude in the Republic of Buryatia.

Preceded by Alexander Gertsyk	Commander of the 1st Guards Infantry Division; July 1915 – April 25, 1917	Succeeded by Nikolai Ignatev
Preceded by Aleksei Gutor	Commander of the 6th Army Corps; April 25 – September 9, 1917	Succeeded by Pavel Markodeev
Preceded by Gleb Vannovsky	Commander of the 1st Army; September 9 – November, 1917	Succeeded by office abolished
