= 1st Guards Corps (Russian Empire) =

1st Guards Corps 1-й гвардейский корпус
- Active: 1813–1864; 1874–1917
- Country: Russian Empire
- Branch: Imperial Russian Army
- Type: Corps
- Size: Approximately 46,000
- Engagements: Russo-Turkish War of 1877-78; World War I

The 1st Guards Corps (Russian: 1-й гвардейский корпус) was a corps-level command in the Imperial Russian Army that existed in the decades leading up to and during World War I. Stationed in Saint Petersburg, it included some of the oldest and best known regiments of the Emperor's Guard.

Until 1915 it was called the Guards Corps (Гвардейский корпус).

== History ==
The Guards Corps was established in 1813, consisting of two guards infantry divisions and their artillery, a guards sapper battalion, and a guards cavalry division. After the reforms in the 1830s, during the reign of Emperor Nicholas I, the corps was reorganized into two separate units: the 1st Guards Infantry Corps, which included three infantry divisions, a sapper battalion, and a Finnish rifle battalion, and a 1st Guards Reserve Cavalry Corps with three cavalry divisions and horse artillery. This basic structure existed through the Crimean War. Military reforms began in 1862, and in 1864 both the Guards Infantry and Cavalry Corps had been disbanded.

In 1874 all guards units were combined into a new Guards Corps. The Guards Corps saw action during World War I and was renamed the 1st Guards Corps. In the Kerensky offensive, the 1st Guards Corps launched an attack on Austrian and German positions in the sector of the Russian Eleventh Army and took heavy losses.

== Organization ==
As of 1914, the corps included the following:

- 1st Guards Infantry Division
  - Life Guards Preobrazhensky Regiment
  - Life Guards Semyonovsky Regiment
  - Life Guards Izmaylovsky Regiment
  - Life Guards Egersky Regiment
  - 1st Life Guards Artillery Brigade
- 2nd Guards Infantry Division
  - Life Guards Moscow Regiment
  - Grenadier Guard Regiment|Life Guards Grenadier Regiment
  - Life Guards Pavlovsky Regiment
  - Life Guards Finland Regiment
  - 2nd Life Guards Artillery Brigade
- Guards Rifle Division (Russian Empire)|Guards Rifle Division (until 1915: brigade)
  - 1st His Majesty's Own Life Guards Rifle Regiment
  - 2nd Tsarskoye Selo Life Guards Rifle Regiment
  - 3rd His Majesty's Own Life Guards Rifle Regiment
  - 4th Imperial Family Life Guards Rifle Regiment
  - Life Guards Rifle Artillery Division
- 1st Guards Cavalry Division
  - Chevalier Guards Regiment
  - Horse Guards Regiment (Russian Empire)|Horse Guards Regiment
  - His Majesty's Own Cuirassier Guards Regiment|His Majesty's Own Cuirassier Life Guards Regiment
  - Her Majesty's Own Cuirassier Guards Regiment|Her Majesty the Empress Maria Feodorovna's Own Life Guards Regiment
  - His Majesty's Own Cossack Guards Regiment|His Majesty's Own Cossack Life Guards Regiment
  - His Imperial Highness the Tsesarevich's Ataman Cossack Guards Regiment|His Imperial Highness the Tsarevich's Ataman Cossack Life Guards Regiment
  - Combined Cossack Life Guards Regiment
  - 1st Life Guards Horse Artillery Division
- 2nd Guards Cavalry Division
  - Horse Grenadier Life Guards Regiment
  - Her Majesty's Lancer Guards Regiment|Her Majesty the Empress Alexandra Feodorovona's Lancer Life Guards Regiment
  - Dragoon Life Guards Regiment
  - His Majesty's Hussar Life Guards Regiment
  - 2nd Life Guards Horse Artillery Division

== Commanders ==
- Grand Duke Konstantin Pavlovich of Russia 1831
- Friedrich von Rüdiger 1855-1856
- Grand Duke Nicholas Nikolaevich of Russia (1831–1891) 1862-1864
- Alexander III of Russia 1874-1880
- Grand Duke Vladimir Alexandrovich of Russia 1880-1881
- Pavel Andreyevich Shuvalov 1881-1885
- Duke Alexander of Oldenburg 1885-1889
- Nikolai Obolensky 1897-1898
- Grand Duke Paul Alexandrovich of Russia 1898-1902
- Sergei Vasilchikov 1902-1906
- Vladimir Danilov 1906-1912
- Vladimir Besobrasow (19.01.1912 — 25.08.1915)
- Vladimir Olohov (25.08.1915 - 08.12.1915)
- Georgy Ottonovich Rauch|Georgi Rauch (08.12.1915 — 27.05.1916)
- Grand Duke Paul Alexandrovich of Russia (27.05.1916 — end 1916)
- Pavel Pototsky (end 1916 - 02.04.1917)
- Nikolai Ilkevich (02.04.1917 - 07.1917)
- Vladimir May-Mayevsky (07.1917 — 01.1918)

== Sources ==
- Wildman, Allan (1987). The End of the Russian Imperial Army: The Road to Soviet Power and Peace. Vol. II. Princeton: Princeton University Press. ISBN 0-691-05504-1.
