= Lithuanian Life Guards Regiment =

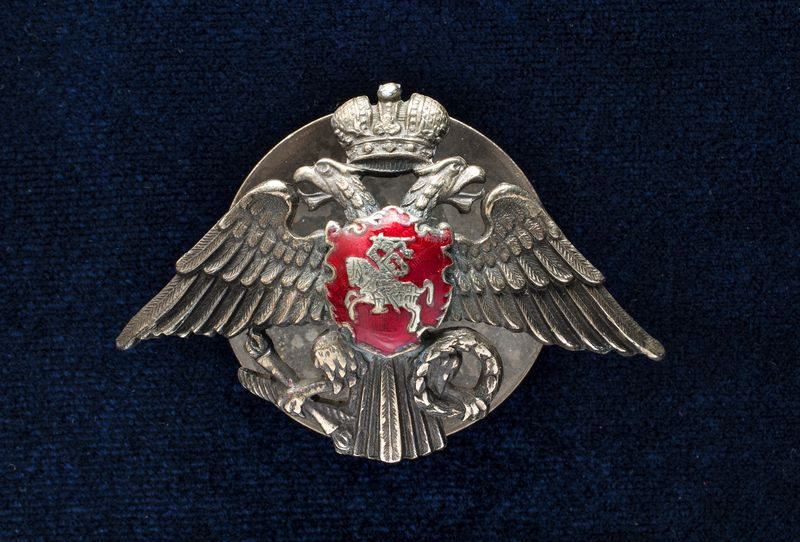
- Insignia of the regiment
- Active: 1817–1918
- Country: Russian Empire
- Branch: Russian Imperial Guard
- Part of: 3rd Guards Infantry Division
- Garrison/HQ: Warsaw

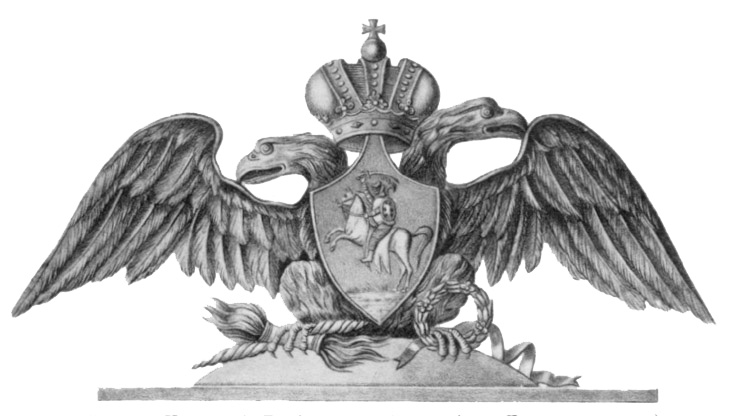
The Russian Imperial Guard shako coat of arms, established in 1818 for the Life Guards Lithuanian Regiment

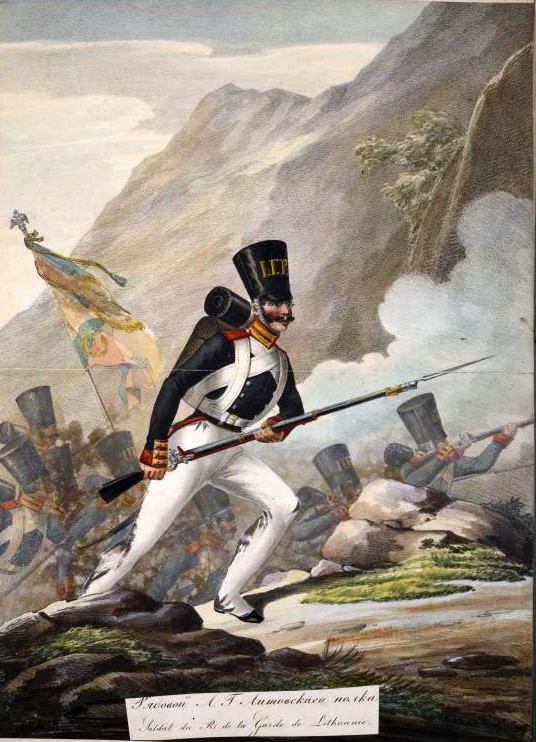
Lithuanian Life Guards Regiment in 1830

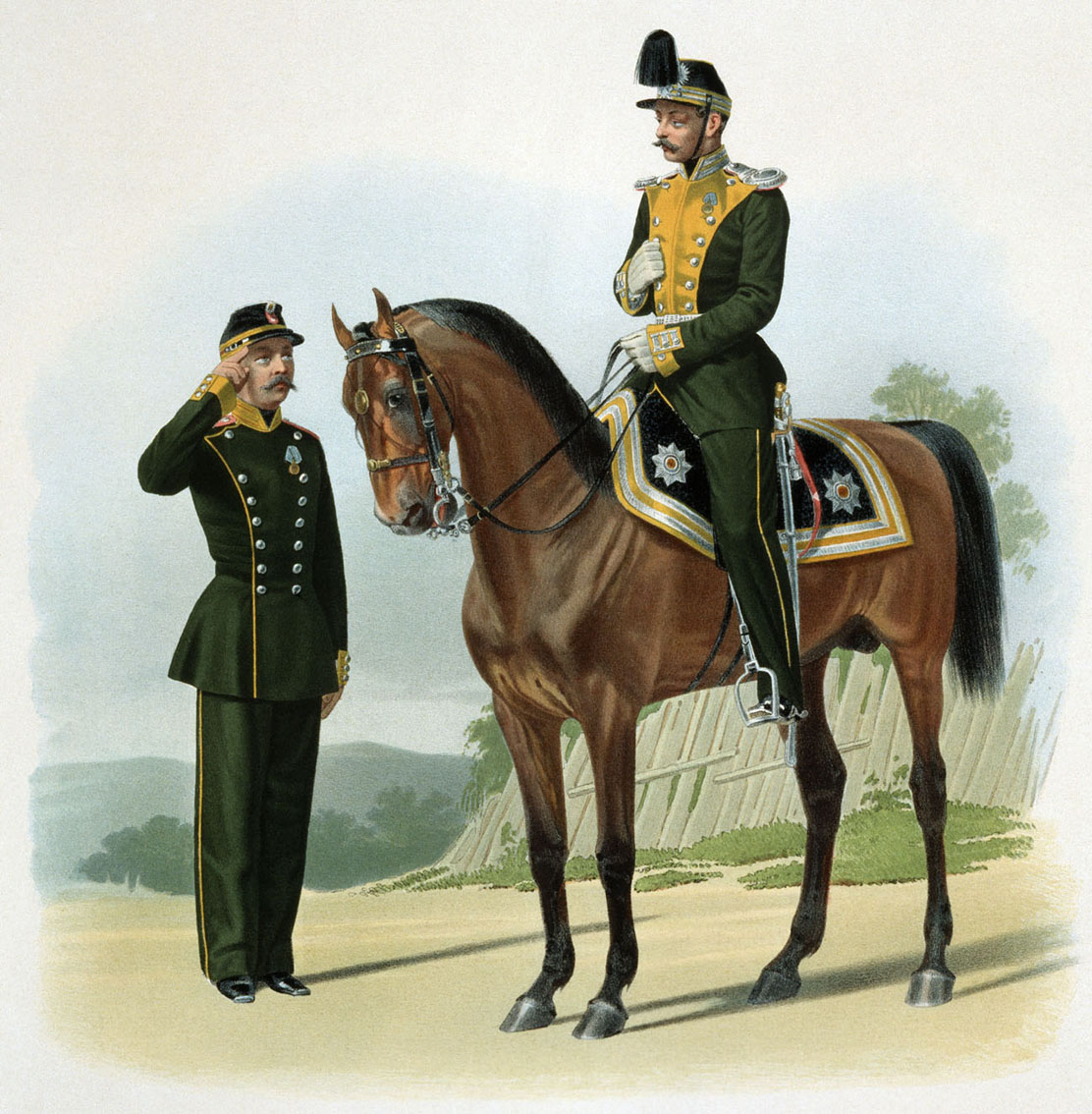
Private and adjutant of the Lithuanian Life Guards Regiment (in everyday and ceremonial uniforms), 1862

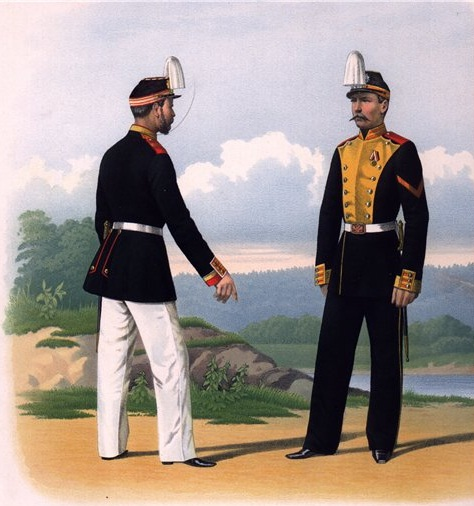
NCO of the Izmailovsky and Private of the Lithuanian Life Guards Regiments in 1872

The Lithuanian Life Guards Regiment (Lithuanian: Лейб-гвардии Литовский полк, romanized: Leyb-gvardii Litovskiy polk) was an infantry regiment of the Russian Imperial Guard.

The regiment, composed of three battalions, was formed on October 12, 1817, from the 3rd (1) battalion of the former Lithuanian Life Guards Regiment (then renamed the Moscow Life Guards), which was stationed in Warsaw under Tsarevich Konstantin Pavlovich. It was joined by natives of the Congress Poland from other regiments. It was then granted the rights and privileges of the Old Guards. Unlike other Guards regiments, the Guards' insignia featured the ancient coat of arms of Lithuania, on the shield next to the double-headed eagle, instead of St. George the Victorious.

== History ==
One of the renowned regiments of the Imperial Russian Army. Formed in November 1811 with three battalions, it served in the Guards Infantry Division. It took part in the French invasion of Russia of 1812. It received its baptism of fire at the Battle of Borodino, distinguishing itself in repelling an attack by French cuirassiers and defending the heights at Semyonovsky Ravine. Mikhail Kutuzov wrote that at the Battle of Borodino, the Lithuanian and Izmailovsky Life Guards Regiments "covered themselves with glory in the sight of the entire army."

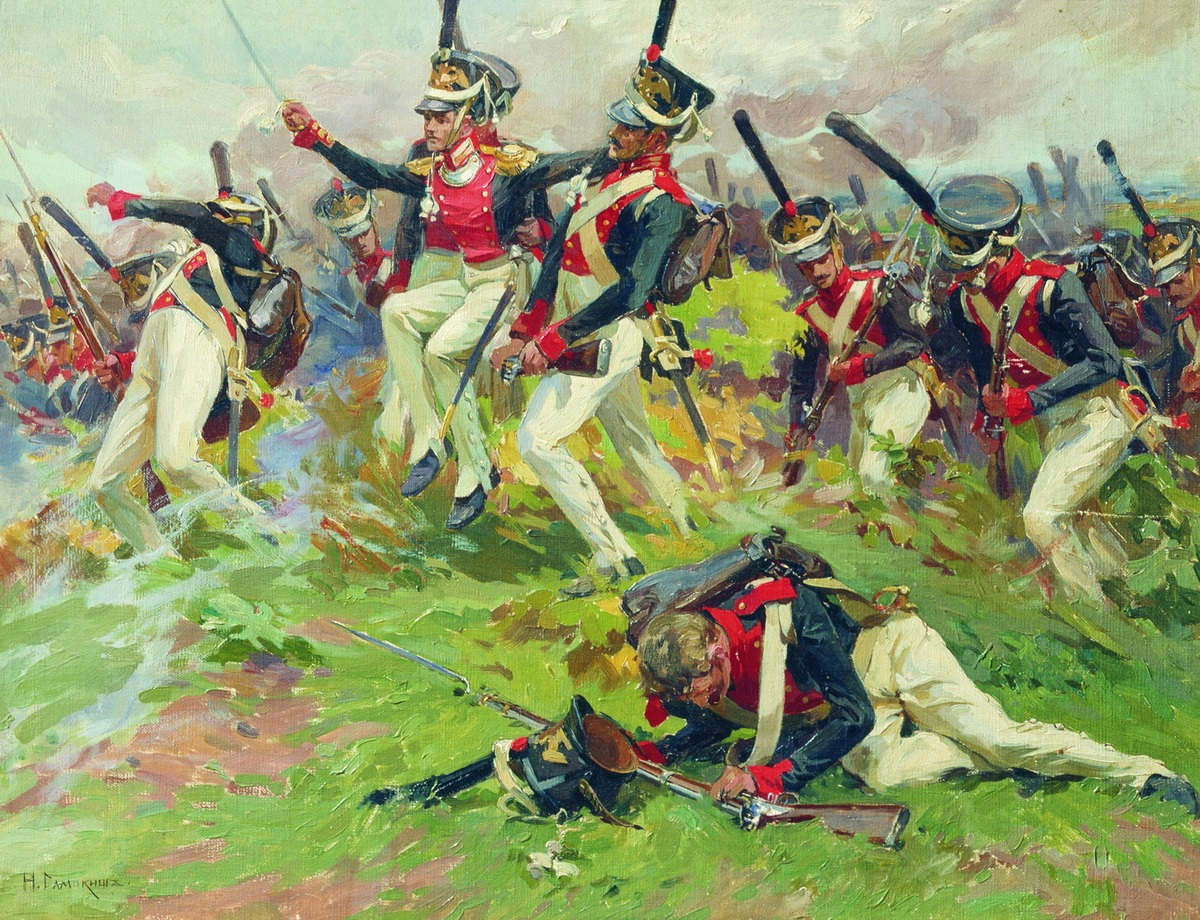
Attack of the Lithuanian Life Guards Regiment

As part of the Russian Guard, the regiment participated in the Battle of Maloyaroslavets and pursued the French. For their courage and heroism, all battalions of the regiment were awarded the St. George banner in 1813, bearing the inscription: "For distinction in the defeat and expulsion of the enemy from Russia in 1812." During the War of the Sixth Coalition in 1813, the regiment fought in the battles of Lützen, Bautzen, Dresden, Leipzig, and Kulm.

On October 12, 1817, during the celebration of the fifth anniversary of Napoleon's retreat from Moscow and the laying of the foundation stone of the Cathedral of Christ the Saviour in honour of the victory over Napoleon's army, in commemoration of the special feats rendered by the regiment in the Battle of Borodino and the defence of Moscow, the Lithuanian Life Guards Regiment was renamed the Moscow Life Guards Regiment.

All dates are according to the Julian calendar, also known as the Old Style.

- October 12, 1817 – From the 3rd Battalion of the Lithuanian Life Guards Regiment, which had been in Warsaw since 1814 in the Guards detachment under Tsarevich Konstantin Pavlovich, with the addition of natives of Congress Poland from other regiments, a new Life Guards Lithuanian Regiment was formed with the rights and privileges of the Old Guard.
- April 16, 1818 – The regiment was organised into two battalions, each with one grenadier company and three fusilier companies.
- November 18, 1830 – After the November Night, the regiment, along with other Russian units, was concentrated near Wierzbno.
- November 21, 1830 – The regiment was ordered to leave Congress Poland.
- December 2, 1830 – The regiment crossed the border of Congress Poland on the Bug River near Włodawa.
- 1831 – The regiment participated in the suppression of the Polish–Lithuanian November Uprising.
- February 13, 1831 – The regiment was in reserve during the Battle of Olszynka Grochowska.
- April 1, 1831 – Two reserve companies were formed under the regiment.
- June 7, 1831 – Participation in the Battle of Paneriai.
- June 12–July 7, 1831 – The regiment was part of Russian units operating against General Antoni Giełgud's corps at the Prussian border.
- July 25, 1831 – The regiment became part of the Separate Guard Corps (formerly it was part of the Separate Lithuanian Corps).
- 6 August 1831 – The regiment crossed the Vistula and joined the rest of the Guard Corps, and then participated in the assault on Warsaw.
- November 16, 1831 – The reserve was reformed into the 2nd Battalion, and the former 2nd Bn. was renamed the 3rd.
- March 15, 1832 – The regiment arrived in St. Petersburg and Oranienbaum.
- January 25, 1842 – To form reserve troops, it was ordered to have a 4th Bn. consisting of lower ranks on permanent leave.
- May-November 1849 – the regiment participated in the Russian intervention against the Hungarian Revolution of 1848, but did not take part in the fighting
- March 10, 1854 – The 4th Reserve Bn. was transferred to the 4th Active Bn.; the 5th Reserve Bn. was formed.
- August 20, 1854 – The 5th Reserve Bn. was transferred to the Reserve; the 6th Reserve Bn. was formed.
- September 17, 1854 – The 4th Active, 5th Reserve, and 6th Reserve Bn. were allocated to the Lithuanian Life Guards Reserve Regiment.
- February 9, 1856 – One rifle company was formed for each battalion from the regiment's best riflemen.
- August 6, 1856 – The regiment was consolidated into 3 battalions with 3 rifle companies.
- August 19, 1857 – The 3rd Bn. was renamed a reserve battalion and disbanded for peacetime.
- September 22, 1862 – The regiment was transferred back to Warsaw.
- April 30, 1863 – The 3rd Bn. was formed and designated an active battalion.
- In 1867, the regiment (minus the 3rd Bn.) was renamed the Moscow Life Guards Regiment, and the 3rd Bn. served as the basis for the formation of a new regiment under the same name.
- February 6, 1875 – The 4th Bn., consisting of 4 companies, was formed from the regiment's rifle companies.
- August 7, 1877 – Reserve Bn. was formed.
- September 15, 1878 – Reserve Bn. was disbanded.
- During the Russo-Turkish War (1877–1878), the regiment fought at Telish and besieged Plevna. After the latter's fall, it made a difficult winter march through the Balkan Mountains and fought at Tashkessen, Dolni Komartsi, Petrichev, and Plovdiv. It distinguished itself particularly at the Battle of Karagach (east of Philippopolis), where it captured 23 Turkish guns. For heroism displayed in battles against the Ottoman army, the regiment's personnel were awarded the honorary inscription on their headdresses: "For Philippopolis, January 3, 4, and 5, 1878."
- July 18, 1914 – Reserve Bn. was formed due to the regiment's mobilization.
- During World War I, the regiment, as part of the 3rd Guards Infantry Division, took part in combat operations on the Northwestern, Western, and Southwestern Fronts. Fought in the First Battle of the Masurian Lakes and the Battle of Łódź (1914). Fought at Stokhid in July 1916.
- From March 4, 1917 – Lithuanian Guards Regiment.
- May 9, 1917 – Reserve Bn. deployed to form the Lithuanian Guards Reserve Regiment (Order of the Petrograd Military District, No. 262)
- April 3, 1918 – active regiment disbanded (Order of the Moscow Regional Commissariat for Military Affairs, April 3, 1918, №139)
- May 31, 1918 – Lithuanian Guards Reserve Regiment disbanded (Order of the Commissariat for Military Affairs of the Petrograd Labour Commune, June 7, 1918, №137)

== Regimental Chiefs ==
Chief of the Regiment (Colonel-in-chief):

- October 12, 1817 - June 15, 1831 – Grand Duke Tsarevich Konstantin Pavlovich
- June 25, 1831 - August 28, 1849 – Grand Duke Michael Pavlovich
- November 6, 1856 - March 4, 1917 – Grand Duke Nicholas Nikolaevich the Younger
- July 26, 1872 - August 1, 1874 – Field marshal Graf Friedrich Wilhelm Rembert von Berg (2nd chief)

== Regiment commanders ==
(In pre-revolutionary Russian terminology, a commander meant an acting chief or commander. Since the 1820s, the commander of a guards regiment held the rank of Major general, and when colonels were appointed to this position, they remained commanders until their promotion to major general.)

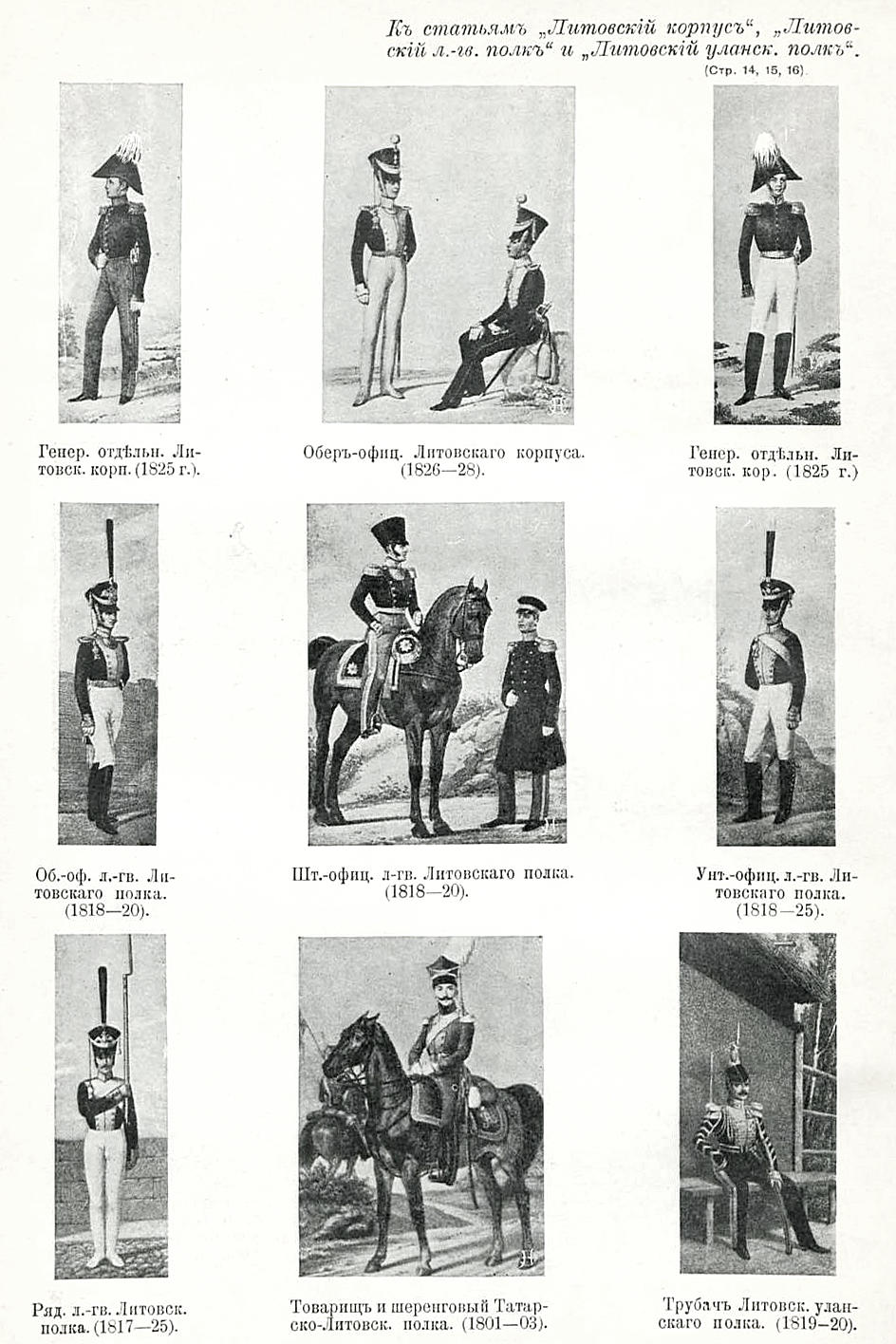
Figures from the "Military Encyclopedia"

- January 22, 1818 – June 1, 1829 – Major General Vasily Mikhailovich Kishkin
- July 28, 1829 – October 24, 1831 – Major General Karl Engelman
- October 24, 1831 – September 22, 1841 – Major General Pavel de Witte
- September 22, 1841 – December 6, 1849 – Major General (from April 3, 1849, Lieutenant General) Vasily Ammondt
- December 6, 1849 – May 4, 1855 – Major General Baron Nikolay Saltsa
- May 4, 1855 – November 23, 1855 – Commander-in-Chief Major General Dmitry Petrovich Fedorov
- November 23, 1855 – June 18, 1863 – Major General Baron Nikolai Meller-Zakomelsky
- June 18, 1863 – July 17, 1864 – Major General Otto Wilhelm Furuhjelm
- July 19, 1864 – August 30, 1869 – Major General Vasily Katalej
- August 30, 1869 – August 17, 1874 – His Imperial Majesty's Retinue Major General Baron Andrey Korf
- April 17, 1874 – December 1, 1878 – Adjutant Colonel (since December 18, 1877 of His Majesty's Retinue, Major General) Baron Karl-Vladimir Arpshofen
- December 1, 1878 – November 20, 1886 – Major General Aleksandr Vodar
- November 30, 1886 – February 8, 1895 – Major General Konstantin Weiss (1839—1917)
- March 8, 1895 – December 13, 1898 – Major General Baron Gustav-Axel von Kothen
  - December 20, 1898 – April 22, 1899 – Colonel Peterov, Ernest-Yakov Kasperovich (temporary commander)
- March 20, 1899 – January 27, 1901 – Major General Mikhail Pashkov
- 03/22/1901 – 04/30/1903 – Major General Andrey Vsevolozhsky
- 06/09/1903 – 08/30/1908 – Major General Vladimir Olokhov
- 10.10.1908 – 31.12.1913 – Major General Sheremetov, Alexander Vasilievich
- 12/31/1913 – 06/24/1915 – Major General Konstantin Schildbach
- 06/24/1915 – 10/28/1916 – Major General Joseph Kononovich
- 10/28/1916 – 08/10/1917 – Major General Vadim Razgildeev
- 10.08.1917 – 22.10.1917 – Commander Colonel Eismont, Mikhail Nikolaevich
- 22.10.1917 – 25.10.1917 – Commander Colonel Amelung, Boris Vladimirovich
- 25.10.1917 – 02.12.1917 – Commander Colonel Korsak, Vladimir Viktorovich
- 02.12.1917 – 21.02.1918 – Captain Bogdan Kolchigin
- 21.02.1918 – 12.03.1918 – Colonel Eismont, Mikhail Nikolaevich

== Famous people who served in the regiment ==
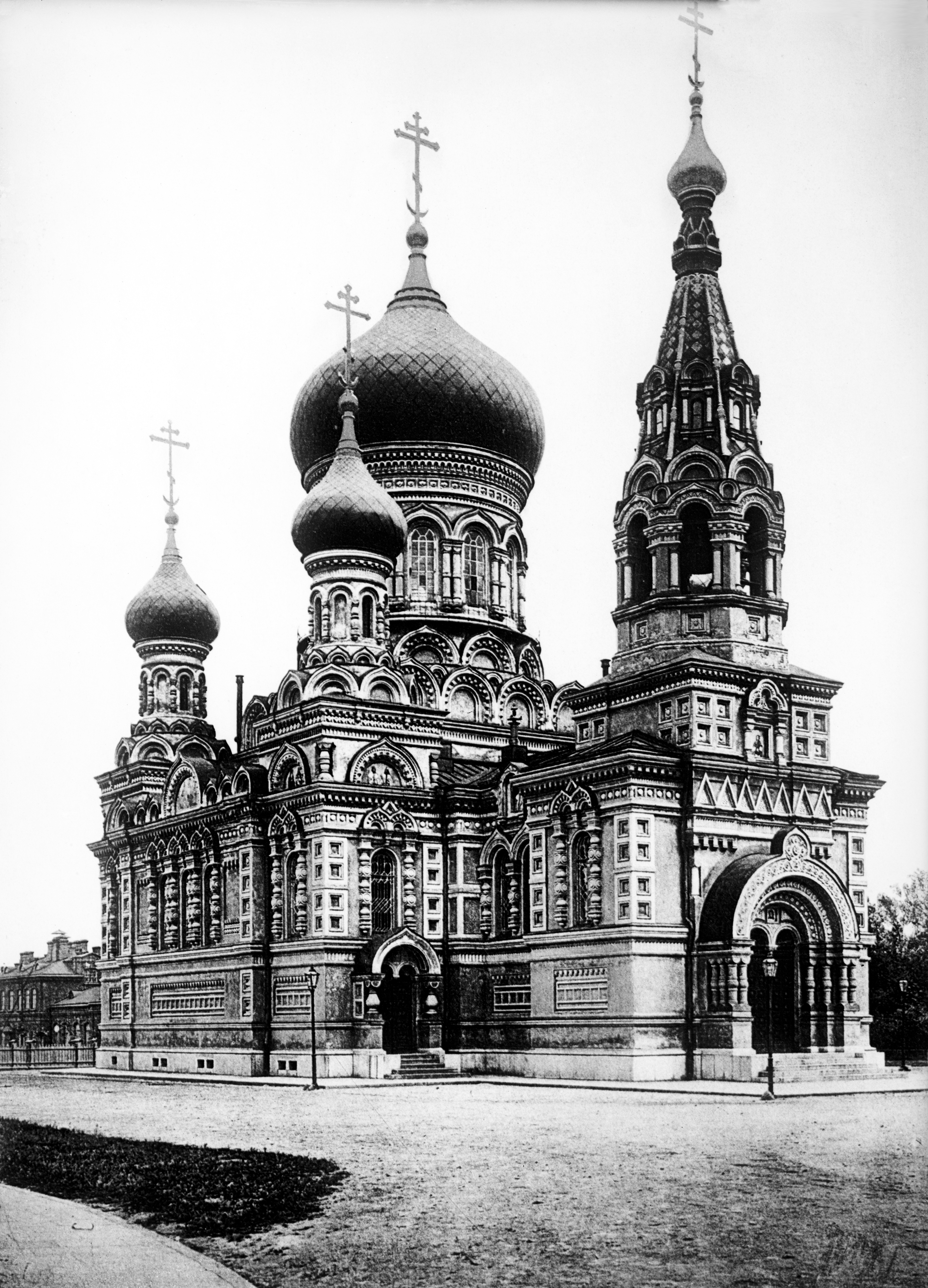
The Regimental St. Michael the Archangel Church in Warsaw.

- Vladimir Andreyev (1896-1971) – Soviet military leader, major general.
- Vasily Akimov – Lieutenant General of the General Staff, head of the 1st Pavlovsk Military School.
- Nikolai Batezatul – general, participant in the Crimean War and the Caucasian War.
- Pyotr Gabbe – writer, poet, participant in the French invasion of Russia.
- Yakov Govorov – military doctor, participant in the French invasion of Russia.
- Mikhail Iolshin – lieutenant general, participant in the Caucasian War and the Russo–Turkish war (1877–1878).
- Alexander Iyas – diplomat, orientalist.
- Vladimir Kossinsky – Lieutenant General, military writer.
- Andrei Lishin – Lieutenant General, Director of the Saint Petersburg State University of Civil Engineering (SPbGASU).
- Aleksei Maksheyev – Lieutenant General, geographer, orientalist, and military statistician.
- Sergei Mezheninov – Soviet military commander.
- Yevgeny Novitsky – Lieutenant General of the General Staff.
- Aleksei Odintsov – Infantry General, Military Governor of Nizhny Novgorod.
- Nikolai Sleptsov – Major General, participant of the Caucasian War.
- Maxim von Taube – Artillery General, member of the State Council.
- Mikhail Bonch-Bruyevich – Imperial Russian and Soviet military commander.
- Polikarp Sharkov – military doctor, state councilor. Shelkovnikov,
- Ivan Shelkovnikov – General of the Infantry, hero of the Russo-Turkish War of 1877-1878.
- Fyodor Eichen – Major General.
- Nikolai Yudenich – General of the Infantry, commander of the Northwestern Army.
- Jānis Fabriciuss – Latvian Soviet commander and commissar.
- Jānis Liepiņš – Colonel in the Latvian Army and briefly Major General in the Soviet Army, executed by the Soviet regime.

== Literature ==
- Markgrafsky, A. (1887). История Лейб-гвардии Литовского полка [History of the Life Guards Lithuanian Regiment] (in Russian). Warsaw Gendarme District. p. 611.
- Sorokin, B. (1900). История Лейб-гвардии Литовского полка [Combat life and peacetime service of the Lithuanian Life Guards Regiment. Our history.] (in Russian). Warsaw: Printing House of the Chancellery of the Warsaw Governor-General.
- Ogarkov, N. V. (1978). "Литовский лейб-гвардии полк" [Lithuanian Life Guards Regiment]. Soviet Military Encyclopedia (in Russian). Vol. 5. Moscow: Voenizdat. p. 12.

== Links ==
- Uniform in 1910.
- Chest badges and insignia of the Guards.
