= Alexander Gertsyk =

Russian commander, Lieutenant General

Alexander Antonovich Gertsyk
- Born: 1857
- Died: 31 January 1916 (aged 58–59)
- Allegiance: Russian Empire
- Branch: Imperial Russian Army
- Rank: lieutenant general
- Commands: 1st Guards Infantry Division (Russian Empire)
- Conflicts: Russo-Turkish War; World War I

Alexander Antonovich Gertsyk (1857 – 31 January 1916) was a Russian commander, Lieutenant General, Chief of the 1st Guards Infantry Division, participant in the Russo-Turkish War and World War I.

== Biography ==
Born to a family of a military engineer, Major General Anton Kazimirovich Gertsyk. In 1875, after graduating from the St. Petersburg Military Grammar School, he entered the 2nd Military Konstantinovsky School.

In 1877, after graduating from a military school, he was promoted to ensign and assigned to the 16th separate rifle battalion. Member of the Russian-Turkish war. For bravery in the war, he was awarded the Order of St. Anne of 4 degrees with the inscription "For courage." For the difference, he was promoted to second lieutenant.

In 1879, he was awarded the Order of St. Stanislav of the 3rd degree with swords and a bow and St. Anne of the 3rd degree with swords and a bow for courage.

In 1882, he was promoted to lieutenant, and in 1884, he became captains of staff. In 1887, he was appointed junior officer at the Pavlovsk Military School. In 1889, he was promoted to captain, in the same year he was renamed the staff captain of the guard, in 1892 to captain of the guard. In 1898, he was promoted to lieutenant colonel and appointed battalion commander of the Pavlovsk Military School. In 1898 he was promoted to colonel.

In 1902, he was appointed commander of the 52nd Infantry Regiment of Vilna. Since 1906, the commander of the Life Guards Pavlovsky Regiment. In 1906, Major Generals were promoted for honors.

Since 1908, the commander of the 2nd Brigade of the 1st Guards Infantry Division. Since 1914, the commander of the 80th Infantry Division.

Before the Great War, he was chairman of the commission for the development of automatic rifles.

In 1915, he was promoted to lieutenant general and appointed commander of the 1st Guards Infantry Division, in the same year “For Distinction in Affairs Against the Enemy” he was awarded the Order of St. Anna of the 1st degree with swords.

He died on 31 January 1916.

== Awards ==
- Order of St. Anna of the 4th degree with the inscription "For Courage" (1877);
- Order of Saint Stanislaus (House of Romanov), 3rd degree with swords and bow (1879);
- Order of St. Anna of the 3rd degree with swords and bow (1879);
- Order of St. Vladimir 4th degree (1886).
- Order of Saint Stanislaus (House of Romanov), 2nd degree (1890);
- Order of St. Anna of the 2nd degree (1893);
- Order of St. Vladimir 3rd degree (1899).
- Order of Saint Stanislaus (House of Romanov), 1st degree (1910)
- Order of St. Anna 1st degree with swords (1915);
- Order of St. Vladimir of the 2nd degree with swords (1915);
- Order of the White Eagle with swords (1915).

=== Foreign ===
- Cavalier cross of the French Order of the Legion of Honor (1897);
- Commander's Cross of the Romanian Star Order (1899);
- Commander's Cross of the Italian Order of St. Mauritius and Lazarus (1903).

== Family ties ==
Brother: Nikolai (1862–1914) – Colonel, commander of the 4th Grenadier Nesvizh Regiment, participant in the First World War.

== Sources ==
- Volkov S.V. Generality of the Russian Empire. Encyclopedic dictionary of generals and admirals from Peter I to Nicholas II. Volume I. AK. M., 2009
- The highest orders on the ranks of the military, 02.1915
- List to the generals by seniority, 15 April 1914
- List to the generals by seniority, 1 July 1909
- List to the generals by seniority, 1 July 1906

Preceded by Vladimir Apollonovich Olokhov	Commander of the 1st Guards Infantry Division; 16 January – 3 July 1915	Succeeded by Vladimir von Notbek
