= Lithuanian Separate Corps =

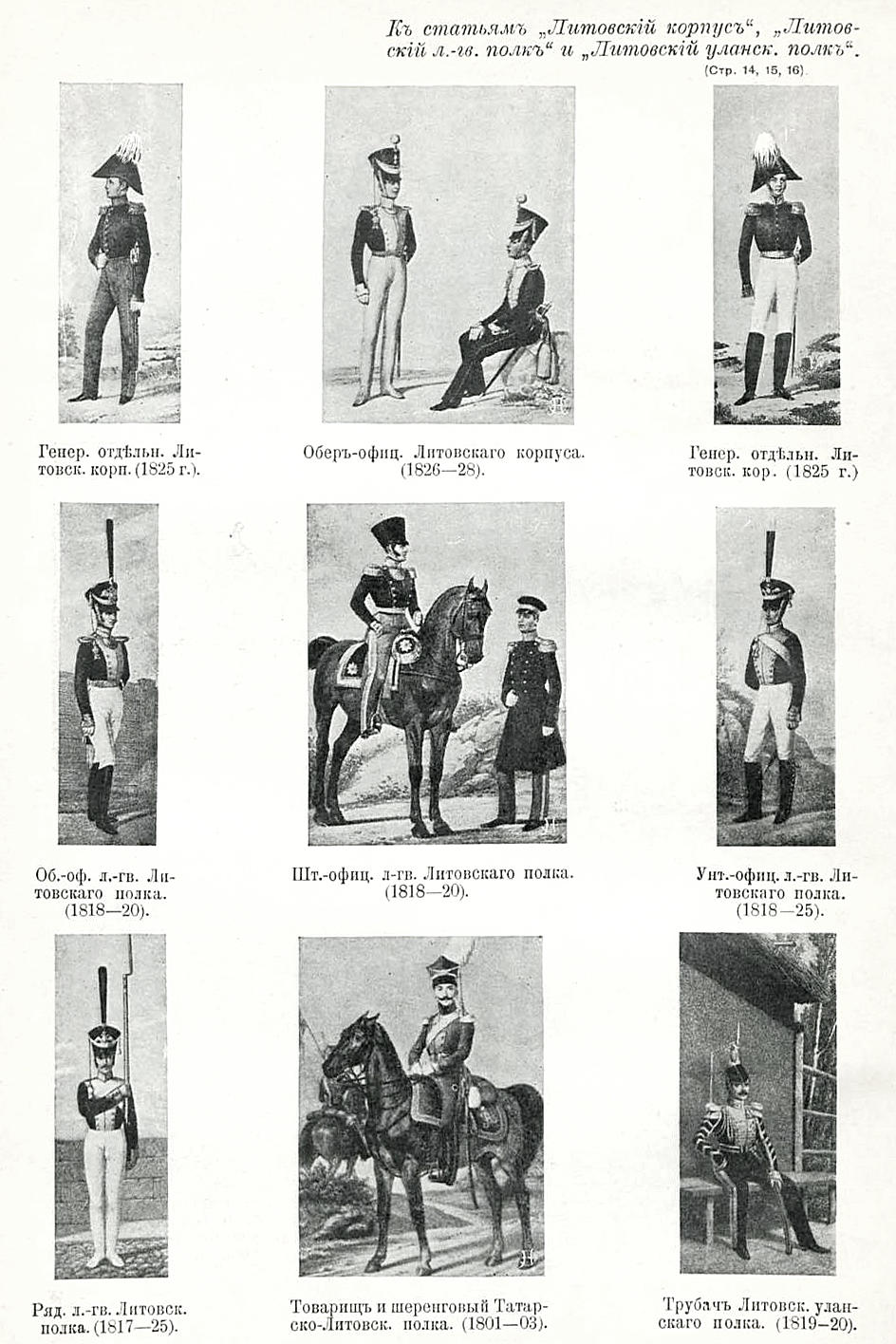
- Uniforms of some of the Lithuanian Corps' units
- Active: 1 July 1817–1831

Commanders
- First commander (1817–1827): Grand Duke Konstantin Pavlovich of Russia
- Second commander (1827–1831): Georg Andreas von Rosen

The Lithuanian Separate Corps (Russian: Литовский отдельный корпус, romanized: Litovskiy otdel'nyy korpus, lit. 'Lithuanian Separate Corps', Lithuanian: Lietuviškasis atskirasis korpusas, Polish: Korpus Litewski) was a corps of the Imperial Russian Army, founded on July 1, 1817. It was associated with the Army of Congress Poland.

After the Russo-Turkish War (1828–1829), the Lithuanian Corps was renamed as the VI Corps. The Lithuanian Corps was disbanded in 1831 after the Polish–Lithuanian Uprising of 1831.

The corps, except for the guard units, was recruited from Lithuanians and Poles, which set it apart from the rest of the Imperial Russian Army. The guard units were recruited mostly from Russians.

== Formation ==
The Lithuanian Corps was formed on 1 July 1817 by Tsar Alexander I of Russia who made Grand Duke Konstantin Pavlovich of Russia its commander as the latter was already the commander of the Army of Congress Poland. The Lithuanian Corps recruited in the five provinces of Vilna, Grodno, Minsk, Volhynia and Podolia and Belostok Oblast, all of which together made up the Russian Empire's so-called Western Krai. The Corps was widely stationed throughout the territory of the governorates of Volhynia, Minsk and Grodno.

The Lithuanian Corps consisted of 2 infantry divisions, each containing 2 brigades, 2 artillery brigades as well as guard and grenadier regiments. Together with the Polish Guard, the Lithuanian Corps' Guards and Grenadiers regiments formed the Guard Reserve Corps, also established in 1817. The Guard Reserve Corps was stationed in Congress Poland and was commanded by General Wincenty Krasiński. Together with its guard, the Lithuanian Corps included 17 infantry regiments, 7 cavalry regiments and 11 artillery batteries. The unit was disbanded in 1831.

== Composition ==
When it was created on 1 July 1817, the corps consisted of these units:

- 27th Infantry Division
  - Brest-Litovsk Infantry Regiment
  - Bialystok Infantry Regiment
  - Vilnius Infantry Regiment
  - Lithuanian Infantry Regiment
  - 47th Jäger Regiment
  - 48th Jäger Regiment
- 28th Infantry Division (previously the 4th Infantry Division)
  - Volhynian Infantry Regiment
  - Minsk Infantry Regiment
  - Podolian Infantry Regiment
  - Zhytomyr Infantry Regiment
  - 49th Jäger Regiment
  - 50th Jäger Regiment
- 29th Artillery Brigade

Then other military units were included in its composition in 1817, including the newly-formed regiments such as the:

- Lithuanian Life Guards Regiment
- Volhynian Life Guards Regiment
- Podolian Cuirassier Regiment
- Tsarevich Konstantin Pavlovich Uhlan Regiment
- Polish Grenadier Regiment
- 1st Lithuanian Grenadier Regiment
- 2nd Lithuanian Grenadier Regiment
- Lithuanian Carabinier Regiment

In 1818, the 1st Uhlan Division, consisting of the following uhlan regiments: Polish, Tatar, Lithuanian and Volhynian, was renamed as the Lithuanian Uhlan Division and included in the Lithuanian Corps.

On 19 April 1819, the Lithuanian Artillery Division was formed from the 27th and 29th Artillery Brigades. On August 10 and 17 October, new separate batteries were formed for the corps, which were the Life Guards Horse Artillery Battery №3 and the Life Guards Foot Artillery Battery №5. Two years later in 1821, these batteries, together with batteries №1 and Light Grenadier №2, formed the Combined Guards and Grenadier Artillery Brigade of the Lithuanian Corps.

On 20 May 1820, the 27th and 28th Infantry Divisions were renamed the 24th and 25th. That same year on September 10, a special supply brigade was formed for the Lithuanian Corps on September 10. In 1824, the Grodno Life Guards Hussar Regiment was formed for the Lithuanian Corps. Finally, the Lithuanian Pioneer Battalion was formed under the corps.

On 25 March 1825, the 1st and 2nd Lithuanian Grenadier Regiments were renamed as the Samogitian and Lutsk Grenadier Regiments, while the Lithuanian Carabinier Regiment was renamed to the Nesvizh Carabinier Regiment.

== Uniforms ==
All infantry of the corps had a silver device, yellow collars, cuffs and piping (the guards and grenadiers also had yellow lapels) and black leggings. The Uhlan division was also distinguished by its silver equipment, and the applied cloth on its uniforms and caps on the regiments was crimson, white, yellow and blue. The artillery had black lapels, while its officers had velvet lapels.

Uniforms of the units of the Lithuanian Corps

Drummer of the Lithuanian Pioneers in 1826

Musician of the Lithuanian Life Guards Regiment in 1826–1828.

Artilleryman of the Lithuanian Artillery Division in 1826

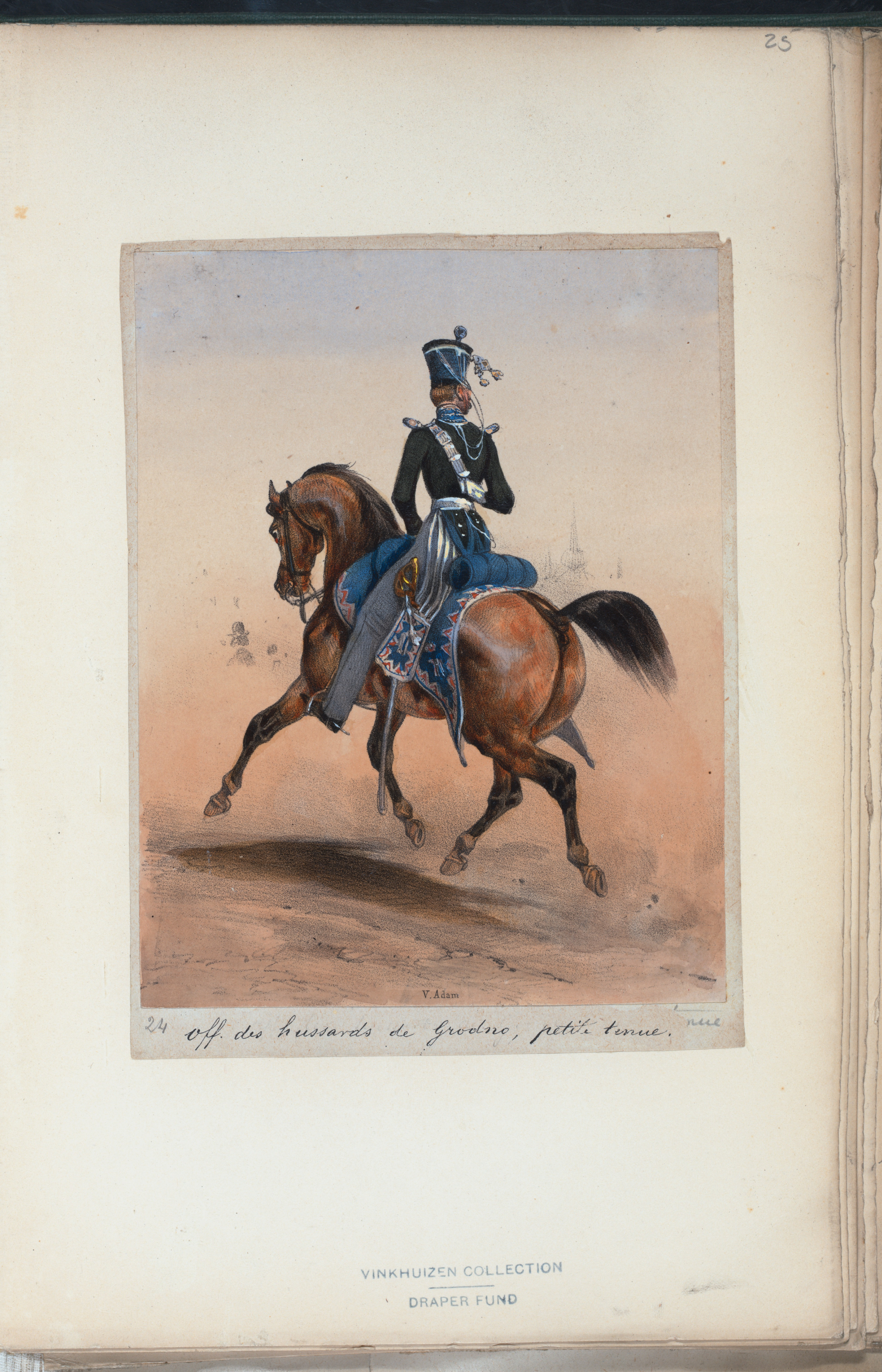
Officer of the Grodno Life Guards Hussar Regiment in undress uniform

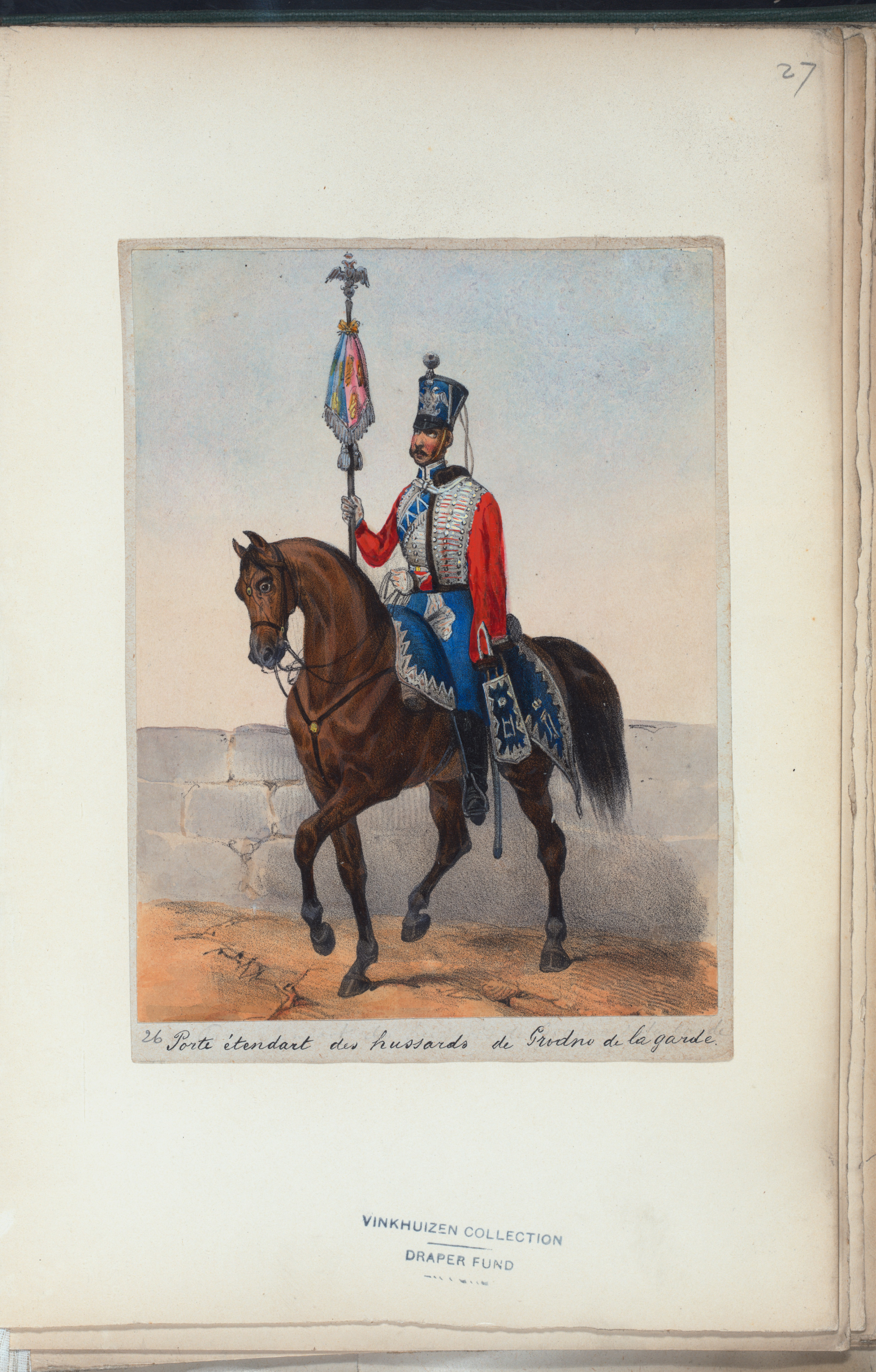
Standard-bearer of the Grodno Life Guards Hussar Regiment

== Disbandment ==
After the uprising of 1831, the corps was disbanded. The Combined Guards and Grenadier Artillery Brigade was renamed into the 3rd Guards and Grenadier Brigade. The Podolian Life Guards Cuirassier Regiment was made part of the Life Guards Cuirassier Regiment.

=== Grenadier Regiments ===
The Polish Grenadier Regiment was disbanded. The Lutsk Grenadier Regiment was divided in 1833, with one half going to the Rostov and the other to the Pernov Grenadier Regiments. The Nesvizh Carabinier Regiment was disbanded in 1831, with its battalions becoming part of the 1st Carabinier Regiment of General-Field Marshal Barclay de Tolly (later the 4th Grenadier Regiment) and the Samogitian Grenadier Regiment (later the 7th Grenadier Regiment).

=== Uhlan Regiments ===
The Polish Uhlan Regiment was disbanded, while the Tatar Uhlan Regiment was made part of the Kharkov Uhlan Regiment (later numbered as the 4th Uhlan Regiment).

== Sources ==
- Kuzmin-Karavayev, Vladimir (1896). "Литовский отдельный корпус". Brockhaus and Efron Encyclopedic Dictionary (in Russian). Vol. XVIIa: Ledier - Loparev.
- Sytin, Ivan (1914). "Литовский отдельный корпус". The Military Encyclopaedia (in Russian). Vol. 15.
- Encyklopedia PWN (2023). "Korpus Litewski". Internetowa encyklopedia PWN (in Polish).
- Ostapowicz, Dariusz (2010). Boreml 1831 (in Polish). Warszawa: Bellona Publishing House. ISBN 978-83-11-11708-2.
- Handelsman, M. (1941). "Chapter XIII. The Polish Kingdom". In Reddaway, W. F. (ed.). The Cambridge History of Poland 1697–1935. Cambridge University Press.
