= Iosif Mrozovsky =

Russian General of Artillery

Joseph Ivanovich Mrozovsky
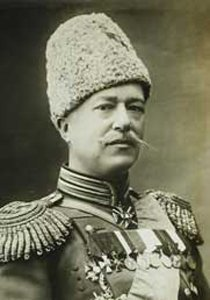
- Born: 14 December 1857
- Died: 16 October 1934 (aged 76) Paris, France
- Allegiance: Russian Empire
- Branch: (Russian Empire) Imperial Russian Army
- Service years: 1874–1917
- Commands: 1st Guards Infantry Division; Moscow Military District
- Conflicts: Boxer Rebellion; Russo-Japanese War; World War I

Iosif Ivanovich Mrozovsky (Russian: Иосиф Иванович Мрозовский; 14 December 1857 – 16 October 1934) was a Russian General of Artillery.

== Biography ==
From the nobility of the Grodno province, he graduated from the Polotsk Cadet Corps (1874), Mikhailovsky Artillery School (1877), and Mikhailovsky Artillery Academy. Since December 19, 1900 - chief of artillery of the South Manchurian detachment, a participant in the Chinese campaign.

Since April 6, 1902 - commander of the 2nd division of the 5th artillery brigade. From January 5, 1904 - the commander of the 18th artillery, from February 18, 1904 - the 9th East Siberian rifle artillery brigade.

He served during the Russo-Japanese War. From August 23, 1905 he served as chief of artillery of the 1st Army Corps.

After the war, on February 7, 1906, he was appointed acting chief of artillery of the Petersburg Military District. Since August 26, 1908 - Head of the 1st Guards Infantry Division. May 21, 1912 he was appointed commander of the grenadier corps stationed in Moscow. At the head of the corps he entered the war.

On September 22, 1915 passed the command of the corps to General A. N. Kuropatkin and was appointed commander of the troops of the Moscow Military District.

During the February Revolution, on March 1, 1917, he was put under house arrest, and on March 10, 1917, he was released from sick service with a uniform and pension.

After the October Revolution he emigrated to France.

== Awards ==
- Order of St. George 4th Class (7.11.1907)
- Order of St. George 3rd Class (09/27/1914)
- Order of St. Stanislav 3rd Art. (1884)
- St. Anne 3rd Art. (1887)
- St. Stanislav 2nd art. (1890)
- St. Anne 2nd Art. (1893)
- St. Vladimir 4th art. (1895)
- St. Vladimir 3rd art. (1898)
- Golden weapons (VP 15.06.1901)
- swords to the order of St. Vladimir 3rd art. (1901)
- St. Stanislav 1st Art. with swords (1905)
- St. Anne 1st Art. with swords (1905)
- St. Vladimir 2nd art. with swords (1905)
- White Eagle (1910)
- swords for the order of the White Eagle (VP 04.11.1914)
- St. Alexander Nevsky with swords (VP 06.12.1914)
- diamond signs for the order of St. Alexander Nevsky (VP 10.04.1916)

| Preceded by Platon Lechitsky | Commander of the 1st Guards Infantry Division; 1908–1912 | Succeeded by Vladimir Apollonovich Olokhov |
