= Alexei Arbuzov (general) =

Imperial Russian general of the infantry and division commander

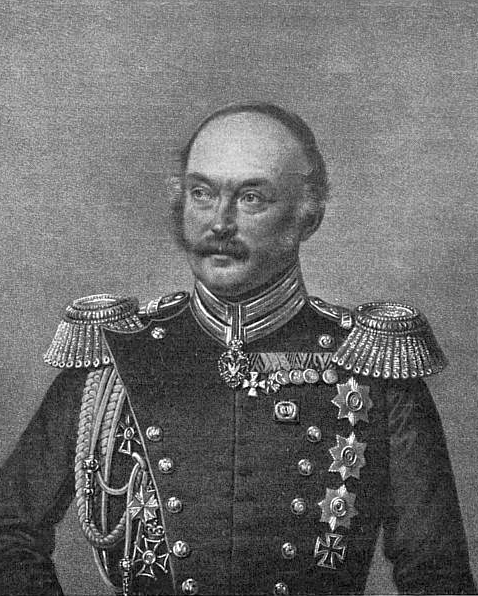
- Born: 1792
- Died: 1861 (aged 68–69)
- Allegiance: Russian Empire
- Branch: Imperial Russian Army
- Rank: general of the infantry
- Commands: 3rd Guards Infantry Division; 1st Guards Infantry Division
- Conflicts: Napoleonic Wars; French invasion of Russia; War of the Sixth Coalition; Russo-Turkish War; November Uprising

Alexei Fyodorovich Arbuzov (Russian: Алексе́й Фёдорович Арбу́зов; 1792–1861) was an Imperial Russian general of the infantry and division commander. He fought in wars against the First French Empire and the Ottoman Empire. He took part in suppressing the uprising in Poland. He was the maternal grandfather of Nikolai Velyaminov and Natalia Nordman.

== Awards ==
- Order of Saint Anna, 4th class
- Order of Saint Anna, 2nd class
- Order of Saint Anna, 1st class
- Order of Saint Vladimir, 4th class
- Order of Saint George, 4th degree

== Sources ==
- Под ред. В. Ф. Новицкого и др (ed.), Военная энциклопедия, Saint Petersburg: т-во И. В. Сытина
- Арбузов, Алексей Федорович // [Аральская флотилия — Афонское сражение]. — Санкт-Петербург ; Москва] : Типография т-ва И. Д. Сытина, 1911. — С. 3—4. — (Военная энциклопедия : [в 18 т.] / под ред. В. Ф. Новицкого ... [и других: А. В. фон-Шварца, В. А. Апушкина, Г. К. фон-Шульца] ; 1911–1915, т. 3).
- Гоувальт. История лейб-гвардии Павловского полка. СПб., 1852. на сайте Руниверс
- Русский биографический словарь: В 25 т. / под наблюдением А. А. Половцова. 1896–1918.

Preceded by	Commander of the 3rd Guards Infantry Division; 1837-1841	Succeeded by
Preceded by Nikolai Islenev	Commander of the 1st Guards Infantry Division; 1841-1842	Succeeded by
