= Alexei Arbuzov =

Alexei Arbuzov may refer to:

- Aleksei Arbuzov (1908–1986), Soviet playwright
- Alexei Arbuzov (general) (1792–1861), Imperial Russian general
