= Vladimir May-Mayevsky =

Russian military leader (1867–1920)

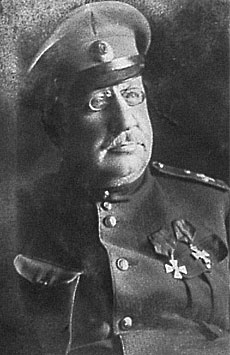
- Born: 27 September [O.S. 15 September] 1867; Saint Petersburg, Russian Empire
- Died: 30 November 1920 (aged 53); Sevastopol, Russian SFSR
- Military career
- Allegiance: Russia
- Branch: Imperial Russian Army
- Service years: 1885–1920
- Rank: Major general
- Conflicts: Russo-Japanese War; First World War; Russian Civil War
- Awards: Knight Commander of the Order of St Michael and St George; Cross of St. George; Order of St. George

Vladimir Zenonovich May-Mayevsky KCMG (Russian: Владимир Зенонович Май-Маевский; 27 September [O.S. 15 September] 1867 – 30 November 1920) was a Russian military leader who was a general in the Imperial Russian Army and one of the leaders of the counterrevolutionary White movement during the Russian Civil War.

== Biography ==
According to Peter Kenez, May-Mayevsky was a complex figure. He lived a dissolute life and his orgies brought ill-repute to the cause which he served. In territories under his control, terror and lawlessness reigned. His soldiers called him Kutuzov not because of his style of leadership but because of his appearance: he was fat and flabby and wore a pince-nez. He did not at all look like a soldier. Nevertheless, he was one of the ablest White military leaders."

May-Mayevsky was born in 1867 to a family of minor gentry in Saint Petersburg. He entered military service in 1885, graduating from the Nikolaev Engineering Institute, serving as a lieutenant with the elite Izmailovsky Life Guards Regiment. He graduated from the Nicholas General Staff Academy in 1896 and was promoted to captain of the General Staff.

During the Russo-Japanese War, May-Mayevsky was promoted to the rank of colonel and commanded the 1st Guards Corps, which he continued to command in the First World War, when he was promoted to the rank of major general. In 1915, he was awarded the Order of St. George (4th class) and the Golden Sword of St. George in 1915; later, in 1917, the Cross of St. George followed.

At the time of the Russian Revolution of 1917, May-Mayevsky was still in charge of the 1st Guard Corps. Although his obese appearance was distinctly unmilitary, he had military talent and a reputation for calm bravery and quick decisive action.

In March 1918 May-Mayevsky fled to the Don region, and joined Mikhail Drozdovsky's White army as a common soldier. This unit soon merged with the Volunteer Army, and May-Mayevsky became a divisional commander.

By December 1918, May-Mayevsky was a general fighting on the Don front, including the Battle for the Donbas (1919). His remarkable performance was due to his strategy of stationing his troops at railroad junctions, and then using the railroad network to speedily move troops to where they were needed most. According to Kenez, "On one occasion, one unit fought at three different places in the course of a single day." He also used airplanes for reconnaissance missions.

On 23 May 1919, May-Mayevsky was appointed as the commander of the Volunteer Army after his division drove the Red Army from the city of Kharkov. His forces moved on to secure Kiev, Orel and Voronezh. However, his forces were thus overextended, and after suffering a number of defeats, problems with his alcoholism increased. May-Maevsky was blamed for the military retreats from Tula and Orel and accused of "moral decay". On 27 November 1919, General Anton Denikin replaced him with General Pyotr Wrangel, an effective general without the moral weaknesses of May-Mayevsky.

In 1920, he led rearguard units in the final defence of the Crimea. Accounts differ on his end. According to one version, he shot himself during the evacuation of the White Army from Sevastopol on 12 November 1920. According to another, he died of heart failure in one of the hospitals in Sevastopol or while traveling by car to the ship for evacuation.

== Distinctions ==
- Order of St. Stanislaus 2nd degree, 1906 (3rd degree, 1900)
- Order of St. Anne 2nd degree 1907 (3rd degree 1904)
- Order of St Vladimir 3rd degree, 1912 (4th degree, 1909)
- Order of St. George, 4th class, 1915
- Gold Sword for Bravery (1915)
- Cross of St. George with a laurel branch, 1917
- Honorary Knight of the Order of St Michael and St George, 1921 (UK)

== See also ==
- White movement
- Volunteer Army
- Russian Civil War
