= Nikolai Ignatev =

Russian major general (1872–1962)

Nikolai Nikolayevich Ignatev
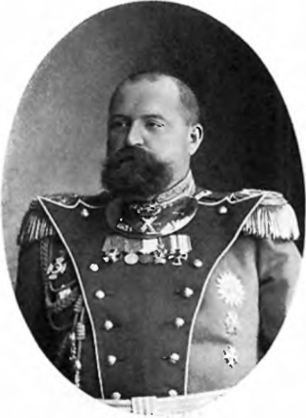
- Born: 1872 Constantinople, Ottoman Empire (modern Istanbul, Turkey)
- Died: 1962 (aged 89–90) Sofia, Bulgaria
- Allegiance: Russian Empire
- Branch: Imperial Russian Army
- Rank: major general
- Commands: 1st Guards Infantry Division (Russian Empire)
- Battles / wars: World War I Russian Civil War

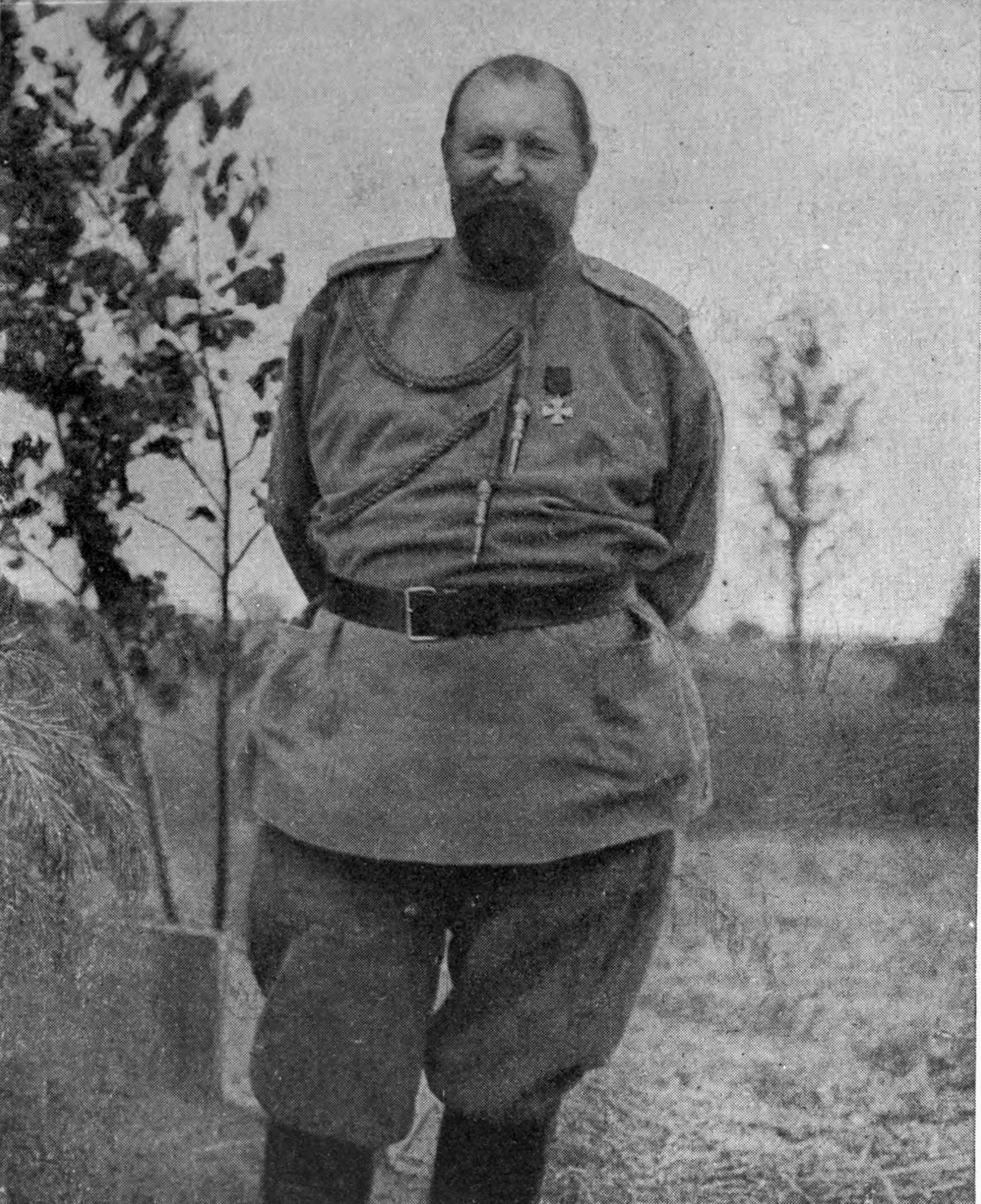
Ignatev in August 1915

Count Nikolai Nikolayevich Ignatev (Russian: Никола́й Никола́евич Игна́тьев; 1872–1962) was a Russian major general, commander of the Preobrazhensky Regiment, hero of the First World War.

== Biography ==
From the nobles of Tver Governorate. Born in Constantinople, where his father, Nikolai Pavlovich, served as Envoy Extraordinary at the Ottoman Port. Elder brother Paul is the Minister of Education.

He graduated from the Alexander Cadet Corps (1889) and the Page Corps (1891), was released as second lieutenant in the Life Guards Preobrazhensky Regiment.

Ranks: Lieutenant (1895), Staff Captain (1900), Captain (1903), Colonel (1910), Aide-adjutant (1912), Major General (for distinction, 1915).

He commanded a company and a battalion of the Preobrazhensky regiment. In 1897, he graduated from the Nikolaev Academy of the General Staff. In 1911-1914, he was the senior staff officer of the regiment. On July 12, 1914, he was appointed commander of the Preobrazhensky Regiment, with which he entered the First World War. He was awarded the Order of St. George, 4th degree: “For leading the brilliant actions of the regiment with great courage in the battles of the Lublin operation on Aug 19. 2 Sept. 1914, especially August 20. In 1914, at Vladislavov, during the defense of the regiment taken at 114.3 heights, when, despite repeated fierce enemy onslaught, heavy losses (17 officers and 800 lower ranks) and a double order to withdraw, he maintained his position and thereby ensured the division’s flank and the success of the Sukhodol operation."

and St. George’s weapons: “Because, being in the rank of colonel, on October 13, 1914, as commander of the Life Guards of the Preobrazhensky regiment and directing the fighting of the named regiment near Ivangorod, under heavy gun and artillery fire, he captured the village. Penkov kept this important point until the end of the battle."

On March 22, 1915, he was promoted to major general with approval in the post and enrollment in the retinue. On November 28, 1915, was appointed chief of staff of the Guards detachment. On May 17, 1916, he was appointed corrective of the post of chief of staff of the Guards, on August 21 of the same year, commander of the 1st Brigade of the 1st Guards Infantry Division. On April 16, 1917, he was appointed commander of the Guards Rifle Division, and on April 29, the 1st Guards Infantry Division. July 31, 1917 was expelled to the reserve of ranks at the headquarters of the Kiev military district.

In 1918, he served in the army of Hetman Skoropadsky, commanded the 6th personnel division. Then he participated in the White Movement as part of the All-Union Socialist League. In December 1919, he was the chief of defense of the Odessa region. In January 1920, he was evacuated from Odessa.

He wandered around Europe for a long time, without stopping anywhere: through Turkey he came to Paris, lived with his older brother in London. Then he, as the son of Count Ignatiev, was invited to Sofia, where he worked at the National Library.

After him there were diaries describing the retreat of the Wrangel army.

== Family ==
He was married to the daughter of Colonel Maria (Magdalene) Vasilievna Krasovsky. In 1908, their son Nikolai was born in Belaray, Lublin province. After the Civil War, the wife with her son and two daughters remained in Russia. In 1922, they moved to Rostov-on-Don. In World War II, Nikolai Nikolayevich (Jr.) was the captain of the Red Army, then served in the army headquarters in Tbilisi. Then he held high positions: he was the chief engineer of the construction of the Dnieper State District Power Plant, the chief engineer of the All-Union Institute "Energoproekt", worked at the Ministry of Energy of Ukraine, and became an honored power engineer.

== Awards ==
- Order of Saint Stanislaus (House of Romanov) 3rd Art. (1904);
- Order of St. Anna, 3rd art. (1906);
- Order of Saint Stanislaus (House of Romanov), 2nd art. (1909);
- Order of St. George 4th Art. (VP 01.30.1915);
- Order of St. Vladimir 4th art. with swords and bow (02.26.1915);
- Order of St. Vladimir 3rd art. with swords (VP 10.05.1915);
- swords to the Order of Saint Stanislaus (House of Romanov) 2nd art. (VP 05.25.1915);
- St. George's weapons (VP 18.07.1916);
- Order of Saint Stanislaus (House of Romanov) 1st Art. (VP 06.12.1916).

Preceded by Vladimir von Notbek	Commander of the 1st Guards Infantry Division; April 29 - July 31, 1917	Succeeded by Division disbanded
