= 3rd Guards Infantry Division (Russian Empire) =

During the territorial evolution of Russia, the 3rd Guard Infantry division in the Russian Empire consisted of four regiments:

- the Lithuanian Life Guards Regiment,
- Kexholm Life Guards Regiment,
- St. Petersburg Life Guards Regiment,
- and the Volhynian Life Guards Regiment.

The division was established in 1833. It formed part of the 23rd Army Corps, until the division was disbanded in March-April 1918.

== Commanders ==
- 1837–1841: Alexei Arbuzov
- 1841–1846: Alexander von Moller
- 1846: Vasily Ovander
- 1877–1887: Victor Deziderjevich Dandevill
- 1898–1901: Konstantin Alexandrovich Weiss
- 1901–1904: Alexander Meller-Zakomelsky
- 1908–1910: Yakov Schkinsky
- 1916–1917: Alexander K. Bukovsky

== Chiefs of Staff ==
- 1863–1866: Vasilij Ivanovitch Janovskij

== Commanders of the 1st Brigade ==
- 1891–1895: Konstantin Alexandrovich Weiss

== Commanders of the 2nd Brigade ==
- 1909–1910: Alexander Alexeyevich Resin

== Commanders of the Artillery Brigade ==
- 1833–1835: von Korff
- 1869–1877: Yakov Ovander
