= Pavel Pototsky (general) =

Russian military leader

Pavel Platonovich Pototsky
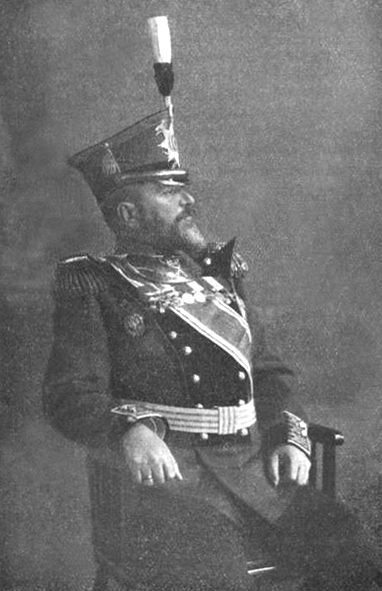
- Born: December 12, 1857 Poltava Raion, Russian Empire
- Died: August 26, 1938 (aged 80) Kiev, Soviet Union
- Allegiance: Russian Empire
- Branch: Imperial Russian Army
- Commands: 1st Guards Corps (Russian Empire)
- Conflicts: Russo-Turkish War; Russo-Japanese War; World War I

Pavel Platonovich Potosky (December 12, 1857 - August 26, 1938) was a Russian military leader, hero of World War I and military historian.

== Origin ==
Pavel Platonovich's great-grandfather Grigory served Hetman Samoilovich. In 1713 he was appointed a centurion in the town of Kyshenka in Poltava region. In 1723 he signed the Kolomak Articles. At the end of the XIX century. In the Archangel Michael Church of the town were kept the donations of Captain Gregory Potocki: crosses, silver-gilded bowls, silver discus, three stars and more. His great-grandfather and grandfather were officers of the Poltava regiment. The family had nothing in common with the Polish family of Counts Potocki. The surname "Potocki" was formed from the name of the village of Potoki near Kobeliak, which was owned by the ancestors of Potocki Pavel Platonovich.

== Biography ==
=== Childhood and Education ===
Orthodox. From the nobles of the Poltava province.

The son of Platon Aleksandrovich Pototsky (1806-1877) and Anna Storozhenko (1824-1868). He had five older brothers who were also in military service, including: Alexander (born 1846), Lieutenant General, director of the Poltava Cadet Corps, and Peter (born 1855), Head of the 35th Infantry Division, Infantry General retired.

He graduated from the Petrovsky Poltava Military Gymnasium (1874) and the Mikhailovsky Artillery School (1877), was released as a second lieutenant to the 3rd Guards and Grenadier Artillery Brigade with secondment to the Life Guards of the 1st Artillery Brigade.

Ranks: Warrant Officer of the Guard (1878), Second Lieutenant (1882), Lieutenant (1885), Staff Captain (1890), Captain (1895), Colonel (1897), Major General (for distinction, 1905), Lieutenant General (for distinction, 1909), general from artillery (for distinction, 1916).

He participated in the Russo-Turkish War (1877-1878), for distinctions he was awarded the orders of St. Anna of the 4th degree and St. Stanislav of the 3rd degree with swords and a bow.

=== Military career ===
In 1881 he graduated from the Mikhailovsky Artillery Academy in the 1st category. Compiled and published at his personal expense the history of guards artillery.

He commanded the 4th (1897-1901) and 1st (1901-1902) batteries of the Life Guards of the 1st Artillery Brigade, the 2nd Division of the Life Guards of the 2nd Artillery Brigade (1902-1904) and the 22nd Artillery brigade (March–November 1904).

From 1904 to 1907 he was the commander of the 25th artillery brigade, with which he participated in the Russo-Japanese War. For military distinctions he was awarded the Golden Weapon “For Courage” and the Order of St. Stanislaus of the 1st degree with swords.

From 1907 to 1908 he served as chief of artillery of the 13th Army Corps (Russian Empire). On July 3, 1908 was appointed artillery inspector of the Guards Corps, with whom he entered the First World War. He was awarded the Order of St. George, 4th degree: “For selflessly and skillfully guiding the brilliant actions of the Guards howitzer and light artillery, especially in the August battles at Kasarzhev during the defeat of the 10th Austrian corps, September 2, 1914, while mastering the crossing of the San River near Křeshov and October 9–14. when leading artillery groups, including serfs, in battles near Ivangorod near Gorbatka, he always appeared in the most dangerous places, combined instructions on the spot with the artillery of the corps and, taking personal leadership of the most responsible groups, repeatedly removed the infantry from a difficult situation and gave the opportunity to take hold of the positions of the Germans and Austrians, which were greatly strengthened and protected by heavy artillery."

At the end of December 1914 he was appointed head of the 2nd Guards Infantry Division (Russian Empire). Despite the courageous and decisive actions, in 1915 the division suffered huge losses. On August 21, 1916 he was appointed commander of the 25th Army Corps (Russian Empire), and on September 13 of the same year, he was appointed commander of the 1st Guards Corps. On April 2, 1917, as a result of a general purge that began after the February Revolution, he was enrolled in the reserve of ranks at the Kiev headquarters, and on April 22 at the headquarters of the Petrograd Military District. In September 1918, during the Red Terror, he was taken hostage in Petrograd, but then released.

He was a bibliophile, his library (about 13,000 volumes) donated to the People's Commissariat for Education. In 1925 he was appointed the life director of the museum organized at the Kiev Pechersk Lavra. A significant part of the museum’s collections was Pototsky’s collection.

== Death ==
In 1938, 81-year-old General Pototsky was accused of counter-revolutionary activity and terrorist acts, he was arrested in Kiev and convicted with confiscation of property. Valuable personal items were confiscated during the arrest; diaries, scientific research, correspondence, as evidence of involvement in his large historical and pictorial collection, was destroyed. For several days, the NKVD officers forced Pavel Platonovich to sign a “confession” about their counter-revolutionary actions. After this, Potocki did not give any evidence and on August 27, 1938, according to the official version, died in a prison hospital from heart paralysis. But documents show that the real cause of death was his brutal beating at the gates of the Lukyanovskaya prison in Kiev.

He was married to Elizabeth Denisovna Davydova, had four children. Pototsky’s wife Elizabeth Denisovna and her sister Lyubov Denisovna Davydovas were arrested and executed on October 5, 1938, as those who knew about the history of the value of his collection. The fate of most of the Potocki collection is unknown, some of its copies are found in museums, libraries, archives of the entire former Union. Almost all films of Soviet Ukraine, which introduced Ukrainian traditions and customs, were based on materials collected by P. Potocki. Twenty-two years after the death of Pavel Platonovich Pototsky, his case was considered, the crime of the general was not finished and the case was closed. The founder of the “Museum of Ukraine” and his relatives were posthumously rehabilitated.

== Awards ==
- Order of St. Anne 4th Art. (1878);
- Order of St. Stanislav 3rd Art. with swords and bow (1878);
- Order of St. Anne, 3rd art. (1884);
- Order of St. Stanislav, 2nd art. (1891);
- Order of St. Anne, 2nd art. (1894);
- Order of St. Vladimir 4th art. (1897);
- Order of St. Vladimir 3rd art. (1901);
- Golden weapon “For courage” (1906);
- Order of St. Stanislav 1st Art. with swords (1907);
- The highest favor for special work on the development of the issue of organizing the celebration of the 200th anniversary of the Poltava victory (08.30.1909);
- Order of St. Anne 1st Art. (1912);
- Order of St. George 4th Art. (VP 01.30.1915);
- Order of the White Eagle with swords (VP 19.02.1915).
- Order of St. Alexander Nevsky with swords (05.26.1915).

=== Foreign ===
- Romanian Iron Cross (1878).

Preceded by	Commander of the 1st Guards Corps; 1916-April 1917	Succeeded by

== Works ==
- P. Pototsky Centenary of Russian Equestrian Artillery. 1794-1894 - St. Petersburg, 1894.
- Peter. Poltava. By July 27, 1909, Pavel Pototsky composed and published.

== Literature ==
- Zalessky K. A. Who was who in the First World War. - M., 2003 .-- S. 493.
- Cavaliers of the Imperial Order of St. Alexander Nevsky (1725-1917). Bibliographic dictionary in three volumes. T. 3. - M., 2009 .-- P.834.
