= Nikolai Islenev =

Imperial Russian division commander

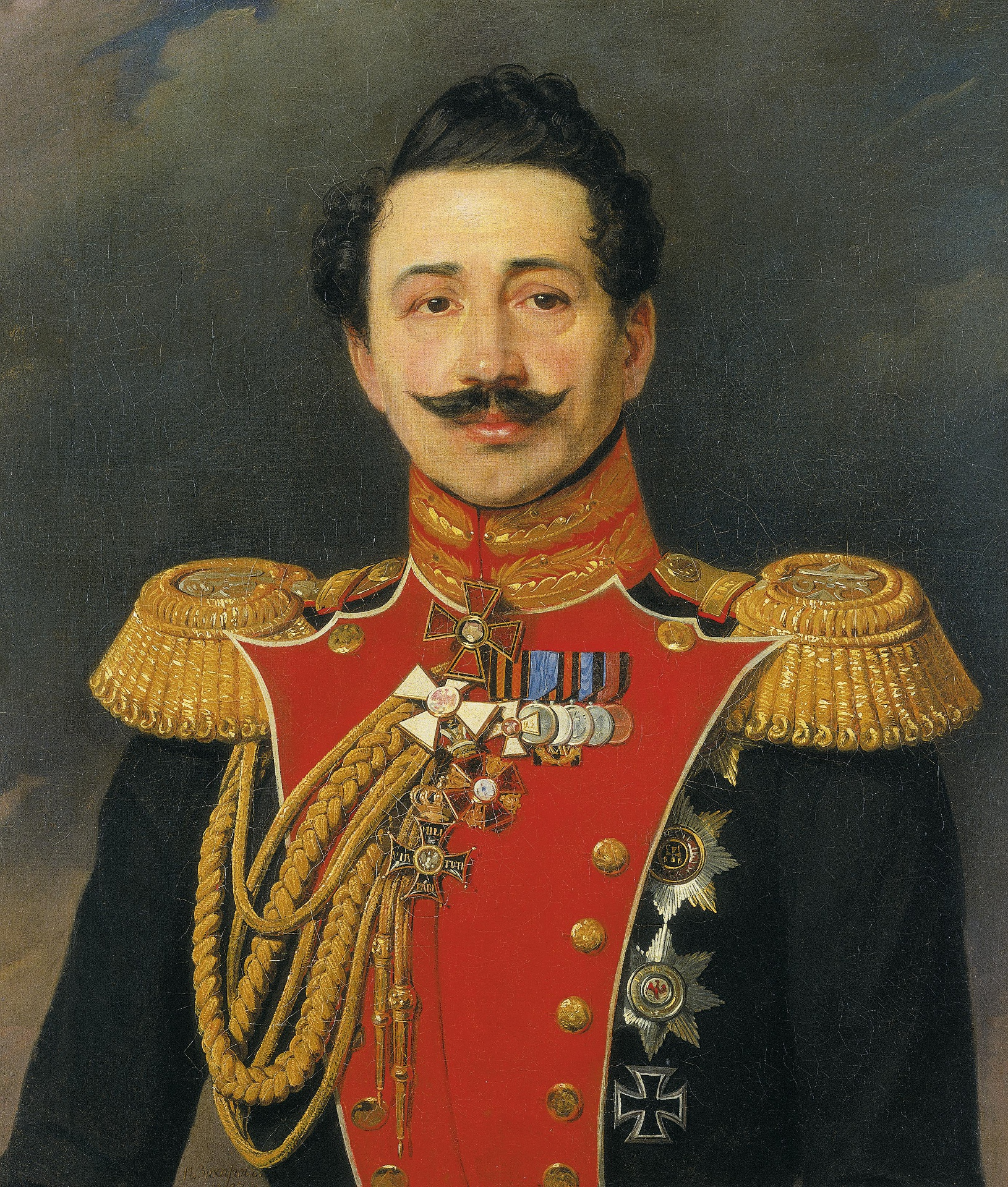
- Born: 1785
- Died: 1851 (aged 65–66)
- Allegiance: Russian Empire
- Branch: Imperial Russian Army
- Commands: 1st Brigade, 1st Guards Infantry Division; 1st Guards Infantry Division
- Conflicts: Napoleonic Wars; War of the Fourth Coalition; French invasion of Russia; War of the Sixth Coalition; Russo-Turkish War (1828–1829); November Uprising

Nikolai Islenev (1785–1851) was an Imperial Russian division commander. He fought in wars against the First French Empire and the Ottoman Empire. He took in the suppression of the uprising in Poland. In 1820, his wife died giving birth to his son, who died in 1822 at the age of 2.

In 1803, he joined the Kura Regiment. In 1805 he transferred to the Preobrazhensky Regiment (from 1822 to 1833 commanded it).

He was awarded the Order of St. Alexander Nevsky.

== Sources ==
- Под ред. В. Ф. Новицкого и др (ed.), "11", Военная энциклопедия, Saint Petersburg: т-во И. В. Сытина
- Волков С. В. Генералитет Российской империи. Энциклопедический словарь генералов и адмиралов от Петра I до Николая II. Том II. Л—Я. М., 2009
- Милорадович Г. А. Список лиц свиты их величеств с царствования императора Петра I по 1886 год. СПб., 1886
- Развёртка шаблонов // Русский биографический словарь : в 25 томах. — Санкт-Петербур—Москва, 1896–1918.
- Список генералам по старшинству. Исправлено по 20 июня. СПб., 1840

| Preceded by | Commander of the 1st Brigade, 1st Guards Infantry Division; 1831-1837 | Succeeded by |
| Preceded by | Commander of the 1st Guards Infantry Division; 1837-1841 | Succeeded by Alexei Arbuzov |
