= 1st Guards Infantry Division (Russian Empire) =

- 1-я гвардейская пехотная дивизия 1-ya gvardeyskaya pekhotnaya diviziya
- Active: 1807 – 1918
- Country: Russian Empire
- Branch: Russian Imperial Army
- Type: Infantry
- Garrison/HQ: St Petersburg

The 1st Guards Infantry Division (Russian: 1-я гварде́йская пехо́тная диви́зия) was an infantry formation of the Russian Imperial Army which was part of the Imperial Guard. It was headquartered in Saint Petersburg and was part of the Guards Corps. It took part in fighting against Napoleonic invasion of Russia in 1811 shortly after its formation. It was expanded in July 1914 upon the mobilization of the Russian Imperial Army, and took part in fighting on the Eastern Front of World War I. The division was demobilized in 1918 after the Russian Revolution.

== History ==
The unit was initially formed on 15 June 1807 as the 1st Infantry Division. It was renamed "Guards" Infantry Division on 11 November 1811. For most of its history it was stationed in St Petersburg and was part of the Petersburg Military District upon its creation.

== Order of battle upon formation ==
When it was founded in 1807 the unit consisted of the following:

- Preobrazhensky Regiment
- Semyonovsky Regiment
- Izmaylovsky Regiment
- Egersky Regiment

In 1811 it was expanded and grew to include:

- 1st Brigade
  - Preobrazhensky Leib Guard Regiment
  - Semyonovsky Leib Guard Regiment
- 2nd Brigade
  - Izmaylovsky Leib Guard Regiment
  - Lithuanian Life Guards Regiment
- 3rd Brigade
  - Egersky Leib Guard Regiment
  - Finnish Leib Guard Regiment

== Order of battle in 1914 ==
From the early 1900s to 1917 the division consisted of the following:

- 1st Brigade
  - Preobrazhensky Leib Guard Regiment
  - Semyonovsky Leib Guard Regiment
- 2nd Brigade
  - Izmaylovsky Leib Guard Regiment
  - Egersky Leib Guard Regiment
- 1st Life Guards Artillery Brigade

== Known officer staff ==
=== Commanders ===
The list is incomplete.

	Name	From	To
1	Grand Duke Michael Pavlovich	3 March 1825	?
2	Adjutant General Nikolai Islenev	22 July 1837	22 September 1841
3	Lieutenant General Alexei Arbuzov	1841 or 1842	?
4	Lieutenant General Alexander von Moller	January 1846	May 1855
5	Adjutant General Alexander Gildenshtubbe	30 August 1855	1862
6	Lieutenant General Alexander Drenteln	1862	1 March 1871
7	Grand Duke Alexander Alexandrovich	23 February 1870	30 August 1874
8	Adjutant General Grand Duke Vladimir Alexandrovich	30 August 1874	17 August 1880
9	Adjutant General Duke Alexander Petrovich of Oldenburg	17 September 1880	5 June 1884
10	Lieutenant General Mikhail Pavlovich Danilov	5 January 1884	19 January 1889
11	Lieutenant General Duke Nikolai Obolensky	20 January 1890	After 1 September 1890
12	Lieutenant General Oskar Grippenberg	7 April 1897	12 May 1898
13	Lieutenant General Georgy Vasmund	1898	1898
14	Lieutenant General Georgy Bobrikov	24 August 1898	15 November 1901
15	Lieutenant General Alexander Evreinov	15 November 1901	11 December 1902
16	Lieutenant General Count German Stenbok	1903	1904
17	Lieutenant General Baron Anton Zaltsa	14 April 1904	1 August 1905
18	Major General Platon Lechitsky	21 July 1906	26 August 1908
19	Lieutenant General Iosif Mrozovsky	26 August 1908	21 May 1912
20	Lieutenant General Vladimir Olokhov	30 May 1912	28 December 1914
21	Major General Alexander Gertsyk	16 January 1915	3 July 1915
22	Lieutenant General Vladimir von Notbek	3 July 1915	25 April 1917
23	Major General Count Nikolai Ignatev	29 April 1917	31 July 1917

=== Chiefs of staff ===
This list is incomplete.

	Name	From	To
1	Colonel Mikhail Shidlovsky	1857	March 1858
2	Colonel Christopher Roop	6 April 1858	18 November 1860
3	Colonel Arkady Skugarevsky	2 November 1881	17 July 1888
4	Colonel Nikolai Epanchin	16 June 1895	11 September 1900
5	Colonel Vsily Butovich	25 April 1903	13 February 1908
6	Colonel Alexander Khristiani	26 February 1908	31 July 1913
7	Colonel Oleksander Hrekov	14 July 1915	August 1917

== Books ==
- Bezugolny, Alexei (2012). История военно-окружной системы в России 1862–1918 (History of the Military District System in Russia 1862–1918) (in Russian). ISBN 978-5-227-03506-6.
