= Moscow Life Guards Regiment =

- Russian: Московский лейб-гвардии полк, romanized: Moskovsky leyb-gvardii polk
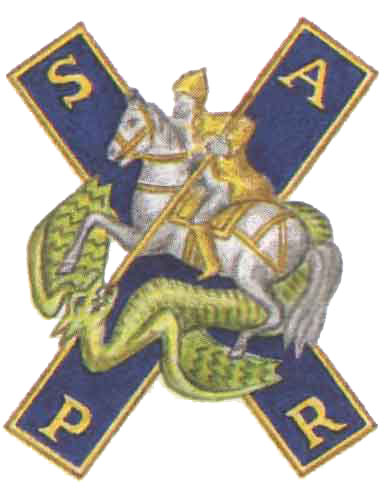
- Badge of the regiment
- Active: 1811–1918
- Country: Russian Empire
- Branch: Russian Imperial Army
- Role: Guards Infantry
- Garrison/HQ: Moscow
- Patron: Alexander II; Alexander III; Nicholas II
- Engagements: French Invasion of Russia; War of the Seventh Coalition; Decembrist revolt; Russo-Persian War (1826–1828); Russo-Turkish War (1828–1829); November Uprising; January Uprising; Russo-Turkish War of 1877-78; World War I; Russian Civil War

Moscow Life Guards Regiment (Russian: Московский лейб-гвардии полк) was a Russian Imperial Guard infantry regiment. Established in October 1817 it continued in existence until the Russian Revolution of 1917.

== History ==
=== Foundation ===
The Moscow Guards Regiment was created on 12 October 1817. In order to constitute the new unit, the two senior battalions of the existing Lithuanian Life Guards Regiment were transferred to a senior corps of the Imperial Guard designated as the "Old Guard" (ru: старая гвардия). The Lithuanian Regiment itself had been raised on 7 November 1811 and this now became the nominal date of foundation for the Moscow Guards.

=== Campaigns ===
- 1812 – Battle of Borodino (as the Lithuanian Regiment)
- 1813 – Battle of Lützen, Battle of Bautzen, Battle of Dresden, Battle of Leipzig (as the Lithuanian Regiment)
- 1828–1829 – Russian-Turkish War
- 1831 – Polish campaign
- 1863–1864 – Polish campaign
- 1877–1878 – Russo-Turkish War
- 1914–1917 – First World War

=== Decembrist revolt ===
On 25 December 1825 the Moscow Regiment played a leading role in the Decembrist revolt. Led by reform minded young officers the regiment paraded for most of a day in the Senate Square of Saint Petersburg, in protest against the accession of Tsar Nicholas I. At dusk they were fired on by loyalist artillery and routed. The officers involved were executed or exiled, and the ordinary soldiers transferred to line infantry units. However the Moscow Regiment, survived with its numbers restored by mass transferrals from the L.G. Grenadierski Regiment.

== Uniforms and physical appearance ==
Throughout its history under the Russian Empire, the regiment wore the standard uniform of the Infantry of the Imperial Guard, which from 1683 to 1914 was predominantly of a dark green (eventually verging on black) colour. The main distinctions of the Moscow Guards Regiment were the all-red facings (plastron, collar, cuffs and shoulder straps). On the collars were worn distinctive regimental patterns of braid (litzen) in gold or yellow material. In 1912, in recognition of its service during the Russo-Turkish War, officers of the regiment were authorised to wear a large metal gorget of a design dating from 1808.

A peculiarity of the Russian Imperial Guard was that recruits for most regiments were required to meet certain criteria of physical appearance, in order to provide a standardised appearance on parade. For the Moscow Regiment conscripts were selected on the basis of their hair colour (red or reddish-brown).

== Sources ==
- Gorokhoff, Gerard. Russian Imperial Guard. 2002.
- Handbook of the Russian Army 1914 by the British General Staff. Battery Press reprint edition, 1996.
