= Nikolai Velyaminov =

Russian surgeon and public figure

Nikolai Alexandrovich Velyaminov
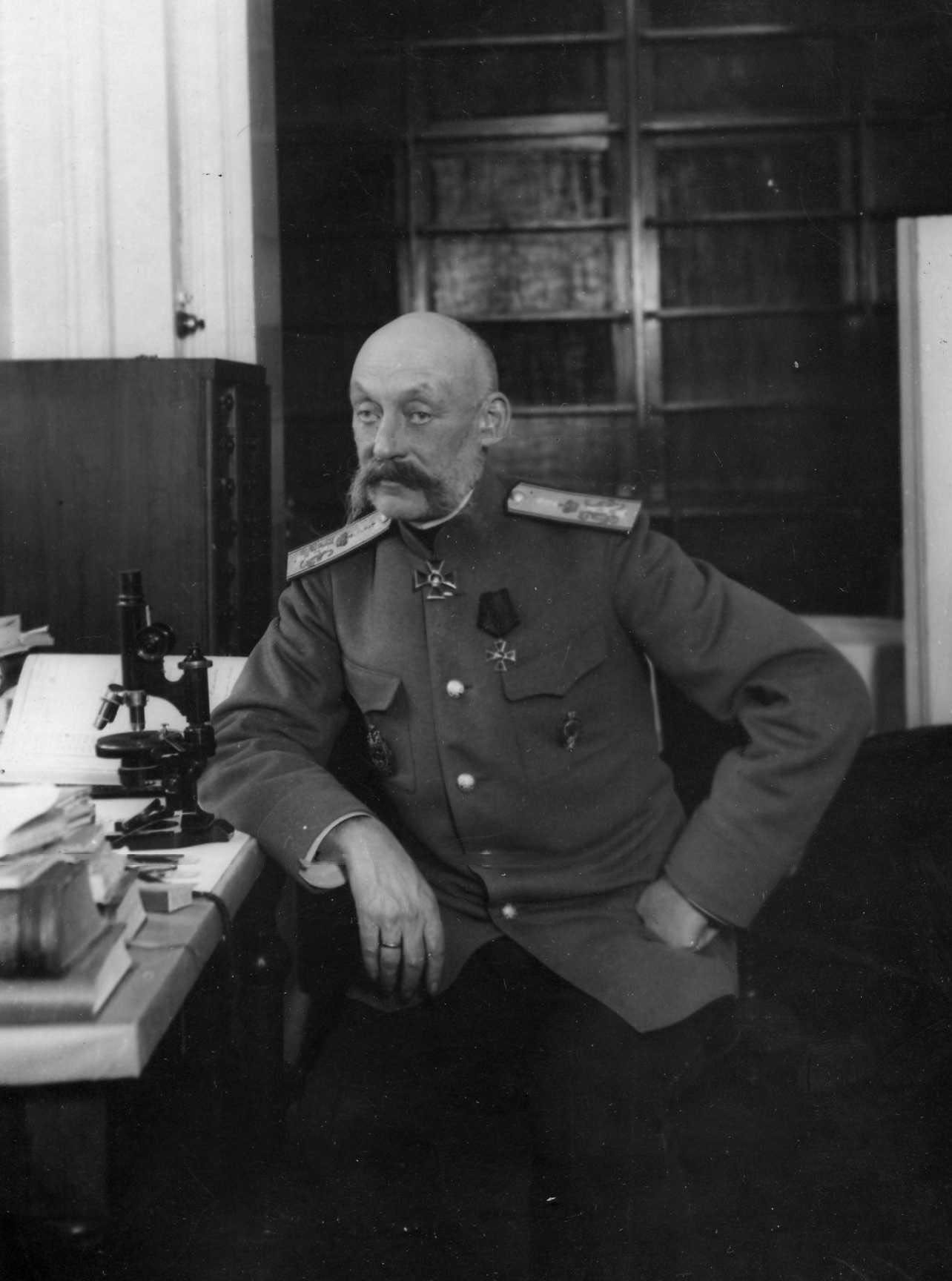
- Born: 27 February 1855; St Petersburg, Russian Empire
- Died: 9 April 1920 (aged 65); Petrograd, RSFSR
- Occupations: physician, surgeon

Nikolai Alexandrovich Velyaminov (Russian: Никола́й Алекса́ндрович Вельями́нов) (27 February (O.S. 15 February) 1855 in Saint Petersburg – 9 April 1920 in Petrograd) was a Russian Empire surgeon and public figure noted for improving the state of medical treatment in the Imperial Russian Army.

Velyaminov was born in Saint Petersburg to the family of a career officer in the Imperial Russian Army. As a child, he lived in Germany and attended schools in Wiesbaden and in Warsaw. He graduated from Moscow State University's Department of Medicine in 1877 by taking his examinations earlier than normally permitted, and was assigned as an intern at a military hospital in Tiflis. He served as a medic in the army during the Russo-Turkish War of 1877-1878. During the war, he introduced antiseptic methods during surgery.

From 1880–1881, he participated in the Battle of Geok Tepe during the Russian conquest of what is now Turkmenistan. During that campaign, he introduced the principle of triage to classify the wounded. He received his doctorate in medicine in 1883. In 1885, Velyaminov began publishing the first Russian magazine for surgeons called The Surgeon's Herald (Хирургический вестник), which he continued to edit for the remainder of his life. He was the first one to open an ambulance station in St Petersburg while director of the Maximilianovskaya Hospital in 1893.

In 1894, Velyaminov was employed as a professor at the Academy of Battlefield Medicine and later became its director (1910–1912). The same year, he was appointed Royal Surgeon to Tsar Alexander III and was present at the Tsar’s death During the Boxer Rebellion, Velyaminov helped organize the Russian Red Cross Society. During the Russo-Japanese War of 1904–1905, he introduced mobile medical stations and medical trains, which greatly reduced the number of fatalities suffered b the Russian Army.

Velyaminov was appointed a Privy Councillor in 1905 and awarded the Order of St. Anne, 1st degree, in 1907. During World War I, he was a consultant surgeon at the Main Directorate of the International Red Cross.

However, following the Russian October Revolution of 1917, he was critical of new Bolshevik regime, and was stripped of his position and honors. He died in 1920 of coronary artery disease, and was buried at the Volkov Orthodox Cemetery in St Petersburg.

Velyaminov was the first in Russia to use light therapy and laid the foundation for the scientific development of this method. He was also one of the first to point out the role of endocrine glands in the emergence and development of surgical diseases. Velyaminov described a new form of arthropathy (thyrotoxic polyarthritis) and developed a classification of diseases of the joints and thyroid gland. Velyaminov was also a pioneer in exploring occupational injuries. He was also engaged in examining the influence of ultraviolet rays on the course of lupus, epithelioma.

In summary, Nikolai Velyaminov (27/02/1855) was notable for improving the state of medical treatment in the Imperial Russian Army, in1894, he became a professor at the Academy of Battlefield Medicine, and after he was critical of the new Bolshevik regime he was stripped of position and honors, he later died on April the ninth, 1920 from coronary artery disease and was buried at Volkov Orthodox Cemetery in St Petersburg.
