= Natalia Nordman =

Finnish-Russian author (1863–1914)

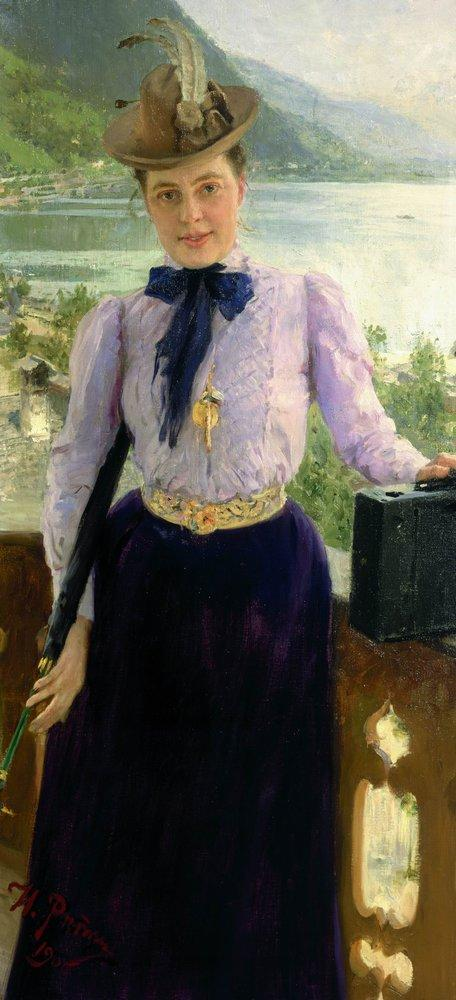
- Portrait by Ilya Repin (1900)
- Born: Natalia Borisovna Nordman-Severova; 14 December 1863; Helsinki, Grand Duchy of Finland, Russian Empire
- Died: 30 June 1914 (aged 50); Orselina, Switzerland
- Other name: N.B. Severova
- Occupation: Writer
- Partner: Ilya Repin

Natalia Borisovna Nordman-Severova (Russian: Наталья Борисовна Нордман-Северова; 14 December 1863 – 30 June 1914) was a Finnish-Russian author who was the partner of the artist Ilya Repin.

== Life ==
Nordman was born in Helsinki in 1863. Her father was a Finnish admiral in the Russian Navy Bernhard (Boris) Nordman and her mother was Russian noblewoman Mariya Arbuzova, widow of Colonel Ehlert and daughter of Aleksey Abruzov.

Nordman was a suffragette and a champion of vegetarianism. In 1900 she met the married artist Ilya Repin who was on a trip to Paris. Repin was captivated by her and they went to live in her home, Penaty, in Kuokkala, which was still part of Finland at that time. The couple invited notable artists from Russia every Wednesday as their new home was a train ride from St Petersburg. The Wednesday gatherings enabled Repin to put together an "album" for Nordman. He created portraits of notable visitors, each painting labelled with their name, profession and occasionally their autograph. Nordman's hospitality was well known and visitors included the writers Maxim Gorky and Aleksandr Kuprin; artists Vasily Polenov, Isaak Brodsky, Filipp Malyavin and Nicolai Fechin as well as poet Vladimir Mayakovsky, philosopher Vasily Rozanov and scientist Vladimir Bekhterev. Nordman was the keeper of this album as it was readied for display at World Exhibition in Italy in 1911. Repin was to describe Nordman as the "love of his life".

In 1911 she travelled with Repin to the World Exhibition in Italy, where Repin's portraits were displayed in their own separate room.

== Works ==
- «Интимныя страницы»; by N. B. Severova (1910)

== Death and legacy ==
In 1914, Nordman died of consumption in Orselina, Switzerland, where Repin visited her. Nordman left her home to the St Petersburg Academy, which could not take possession immediately, as Repin lived there for 16 more years. Repin's portraits in Nordman's "album" were scattered, but were reassembled for an exhibition in 2009.
