= Vladimir Olokhov =

Russian general and military leader

Vladimir Apollonovich Olokhov
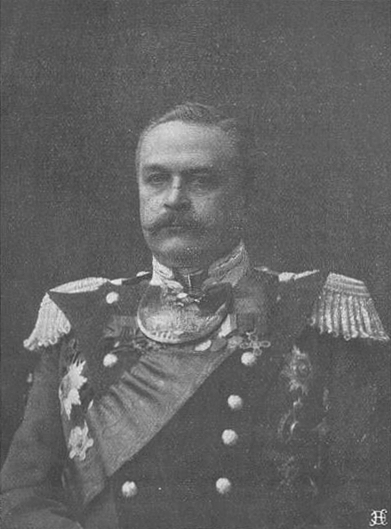
- Born: 21 January 1857
- Died: 14 December 1920 (aged 63) Petrograd
- Allegiance: Russian Empire
- Branch: Imperial Russian Army
- Service years: 1873–1917 (Russian Empire); 1918–1920 (RSFSR)
- Commands: 22nd Infantry Division (Russian Empire); 1st Guards Infantry Division (Russian Empire); 23rd Army Corps (Russian Empire); 1st Guards Corps (Russian Empire); 2nd Guards Corps (Russian Empire)
- Conflicts: Russo-Turkish War; World War I

Vladimir Apollonovich Olokhov (21 January 1857 - 14 December 1920) was a Russian military leader, hero of the First World War, general from infantry.

== Awards ==
- Order of St. Stanislav 3rd Art. with swords and bow (1878);
- Order of St. Anne 4th Art. (1878);
- Order of St. Anne, 3rd art. with swords and bow (1879);
- Order of St. Stanislav, 2nd art. (1883);
- Order of St. Anne, 2nd art. (1890);
- Order of St. Vladimir 4th art. (1896);
- Order of St. Vladimir 3rd art. (1900);
- Order of St. Stanislav 1st Art. (1906);
- Order of St. Anne 1st Art. (1912);
- Order of St. Vladimir, 2nd art. with swords (1914);
- Order of St. George 4th Art. (VP 4.11.1914);
- Order of the White Eagle with swords (VP 19.2.1915);
- Order of St. Alexander Nevsky (29.4.1915);
- St. George's weapons (VP 2.6.1915).

=== Foreign ===
- Romanian Iron Cross (1878).

== Family ==
He was married to Olga Ignatyevna Olokhova (1868–1955), had six children.

== Literature ==
- The Scout magazine for 18 November 1914, No. 1255. With 789.
- Memoirs of O. I. Olokhova. We served the Fatherland, 2012.

Military offices
Preceded by	Chief of Staff of the 27th Infantry Division; 1898-1900	Succeeded by
Preceded by	Commander of the 22nd Infantry Division; 1909-1912	Succeeded by Andrei Zayonchkovski
Preceded by	Commander of the 1st Guards Infantry Division; 30 May 1912 - 28 December 1914	Succeeded by
Preceded by	Commander of the 23rd Army Corps; 28 December 1914 - 1 July 1915	Succeeded by
Preceded by	Commander of the 1st Guards Corps; 25 August - 8 December 1915	Succeeded by Georgy Ottonovich Rauch
Preceded by	Commander of the 2nd Guards Corps; 8 December 1915 - 27 May 1916	Succeeded by Georgy Ottonovich Rauch
