= Russian Imperial Guard =

Military and protective unit (1683–1917)

Imperial Guard Лейб-гвардия
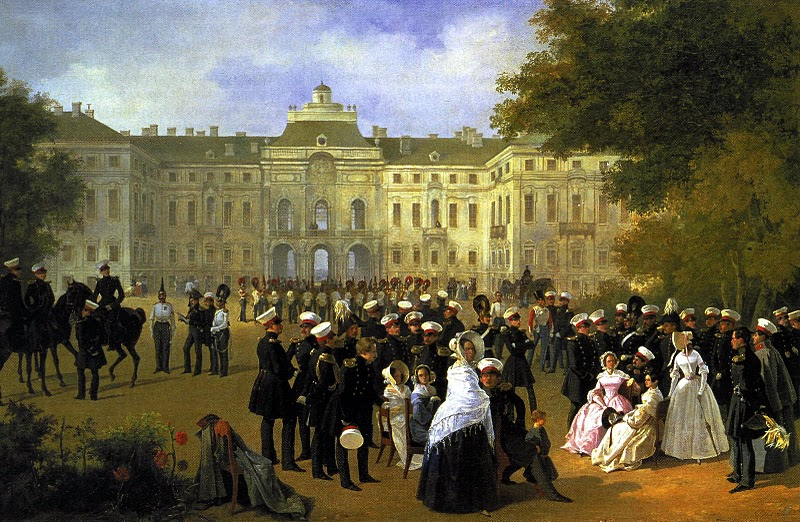
- Leib Guards reception at the Constantine Palace
- Active: 1683–1917
- Country: Russian Empire
- Allegiance: Emperor of Russia
- Branch: Imperial Russian Army
- Type: Artillery; Cavalry; Horse artillery Imperial guard Infantry
- Size: Division

The Russian Imperial Guard, officially known as the Leib Guard (Russian: Лейб-гвардия, Leib-gvardiya, from German Leib "body"; cf. Life Guards / Bodyguard), were combined Imperial Russian Army forces units serving as counterintelligence for preventing sabotage of important imperial palaces, personal guards of the Emperor of Russia and the Russian imperial family, public security in the capital and leaders in spearheading attacks on the battlefield. Peter I founded the first such units in 1683 to replace the politically motivated Streltsy.

The Imperial Guard subsequently increased in size and diversity to become an elite corps of all branches within the Imperial Russian Army, rather than household troops in direct attendance on the Tsar. Numerous links were however maintained with the imperial family, and the bulk of the Imperial Guard's regiments were stationed in and around the capital, Saint Petersburg, in peacetime. The Imperial Guard was disbanded in 1917 following the Russian Revolution.

== History ==
Tsar Peter I (later to become known as "Peter the Great") first established the two senior units of the eventual Imperial Guard, the Preobrazhensky and Semyonovsky infantry regiments, as part of his so-called "toy army" in the 1680s. Peter later built on both regiments as part of his professionalization of the Russian Army after its disastrous defeat in 1700 by the Swedes at the Battle of Narva, during the early phases of Great Northern War of 1700–1721. He was influenced too by his distrust of the streltsy, who had risen against him repeatedly, both during his childhood, which traumatised him, and during his reign.

In 1730, Empress Anna (r. 1730–1740) formed the Izmailovsky Regiment (recruited from her former domain, the Duchy of Courland and Semigallia) out of distrust of the other guard regiments (especially the Preobrazhensky) as a result of her paranoia of losing power. The Izmaylovsky Regiment became the official palace guards during her reign.

The term "Leib" was not used until the reign of Empress Elizabeth (1741–1762) during her formation of the Leib Company made up of the grenadiers (especially the Preobrazhensky), who had helped put her on the throne.

=== Revolution of 1905 ===
The Imperial Guard played a key role in suppressing the Revolution of 1905, most particularly at Saint Petersburg on Sunday, 22 January [O.S. 9 January] 1905 (Bloody Sunday). The Semyonovsky Regiment subsequently repressed widespread disturbances in Moscow. However, a full battalion of the Preobrazhensky Regiment mutinied in June 1906.

=== Russian Revolution of 1917 ===
During the February Revolution of 1917, the garrison of Saint Petersburg included 99,000 soldiers of the Imperial Guard. They were reserve battalions, made up of a mixture of new recruits and of veterans from the regiments of the Imperial Guard serving at the Eastern Front of World War I. While generally still recruited from rural districts, the Guards' rank and file were no longer the reliable instruments of Tsarist autocracy that their predecessors had been during the abortive revolution of 1905. About 90% of the officers of the reserve units had been commissioned during the war, and they were often militarily inexperienced and sometimes sympathetic towards the need for political reform. The overall morale and leadership of the Saint Petersburg troops was poor although they still enjoyed the status of the historic regiments that they represented.

During the early days of rioting in Saint Petersburg, the Semyonovsky, Pavlovsky and Volinsky Regiments obeyed their officers and fired on the crowds of demonstrators. However, on 27 February, the Volinsky and then the Semyonovsky, Moskovsky, and Izmailovsky Regiments defected in large numbers to what had now become a revolution. Some officers were killed. An estimated 66,700 guardsmen in the capital had deserted or defected within about two days. This mass defection from units of the Imperial Guard marked the end of the Tsarist régime.

During the October Revolution of 1917, the Pavlovsky Regiment was one of the first regiments to mutiny and to join the Bolsheviks. It then participated in the storming of the Winter Palace. Much of the former Imperial Guard was still extant in October 1917. It retained its historic titles though its role was now that of politicised republican soldiers. In addition, the Semenovsky and the Ismailovsky Regiments rallied to the Bolsheviks at a crucial stage during the revolution.

In December 1917, as the Bolsheviks consolidated their power, the remnants of the Imperial Guard were disbanded and integrated into the Red Army. As such they saw combat in the Polish-Soviet War in 1920.

== Organization ==
The final composition of the Russian Imperial Guard at the beginning of 1914 was the following:

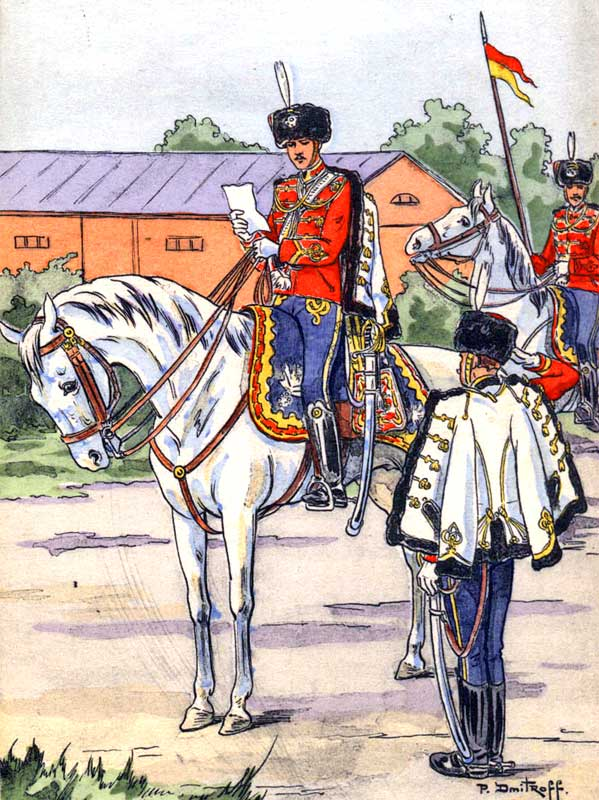
His Majesty's Life-Guards Hussar Regiment, 1914

Guards Corps St. Petersburg District. Headquarters, St. Petersburg, Millionaya. (Guards units not part of the Guards Corps were the Guards Replacement Cavalry Regiment and Guards Field Gendarme Squadron.)

- 1st Guards Infantry Division. Headquarters, St. Petersburg, Fontanka
  - 1st Brigade: Preobrazhensky Life Guards Regiment, Semyonovsky Life Guards Regiment
  - 2nd Brigade: Izmailovsky Life Guards Regiment, Yegersky Life Guards Regiment
  - 1st Life-Guards Artillery Brigade
- 2nd Guards Infantry Division. Headquarters, St. Petersburg, Fontanka
  - 1st Brigade: Moscow Life Guards Regiment, Grenadier Life Guards Regiment
  - 2nd Brigade: Pavlovsky Life Guards Regiment, Finlandsky Life Guards Regiment
  - 2nd Life-Guards Artillery Brigade
- 3rd Guards Infantry Division. Headquarters, Warsaw
  - 1st Brigade: Life-Guards Lithuanian Regiment, Emperor of Austria's Life-Guards Kexgolmsky Regiment
  - 2nd Brigade: King Frederick-William III's Life-Guards St.-Petersburg/Petrograd Regiment, Volinsky Life Guards Regiment
  - 3rd Life-Guards Artillery Brigade
- 2nd Infantry Division
- Separate Guards Cavalry Brigade: His Majesty's Lancers, Grodno Hussars
- 3rd Battery of Life-Guards Horse Artillery
- 23rd Howitzer Artillery Battalion
- 9th Sapper Battalion

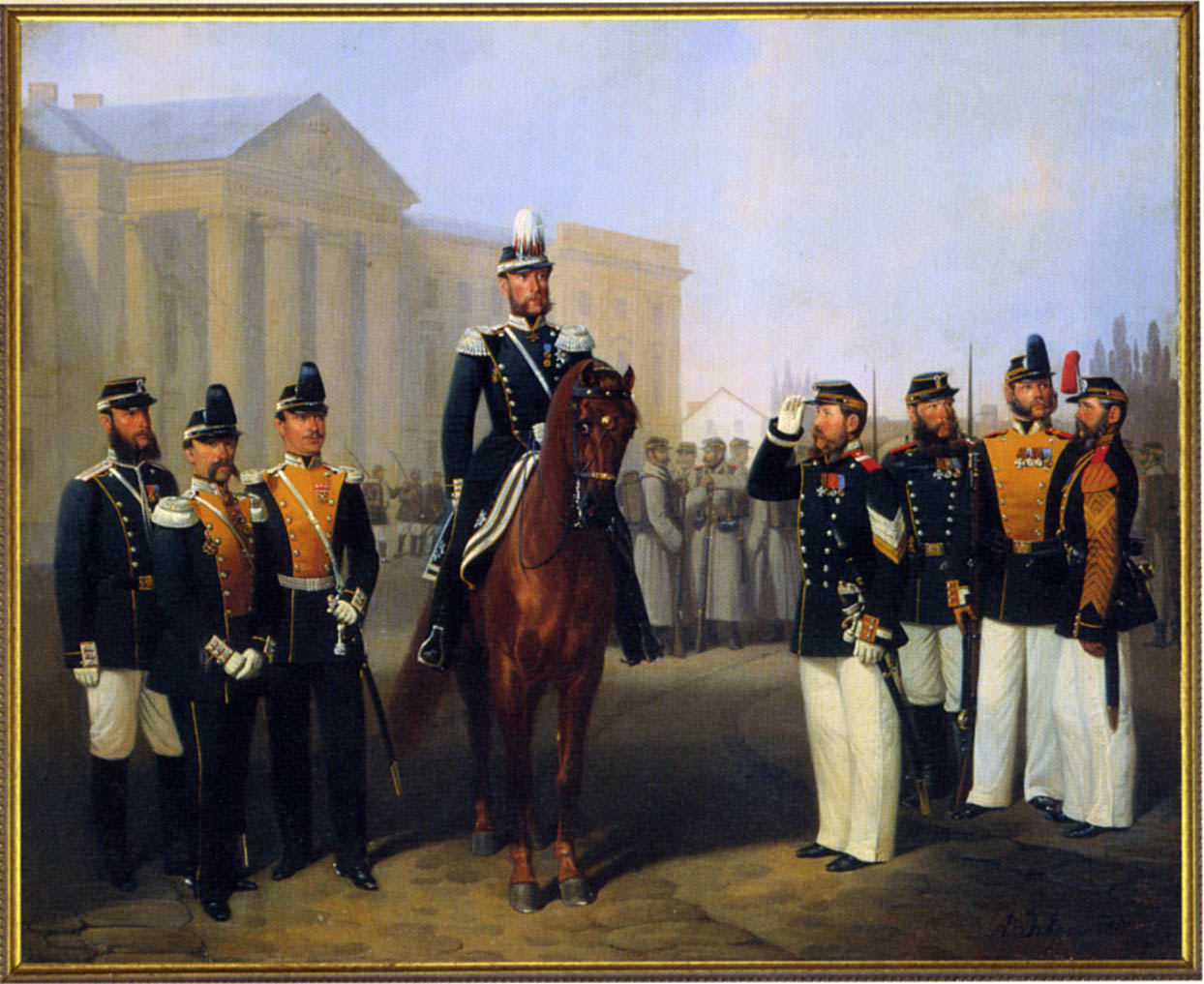
Officers and soldiers of the Volinsky Life Guards Regiment in Warsaw, 1864

- 1st Guards Cavalry Division. Headquarters, St. Petersburg, Fontanka
  - 1st Brigade: Her Sovereign Majesty Empress Maria Theodorovna's Chevalier Guard Regiment, Life Guard Horse Regiment
  - 2nd Brigade: His Majesty's Life-Guards Cuirassier Regiment, Her Majesty Empress Maria Theodorovna's Life-Guards Cuirassier Regiment
  - 3rd Brigade: His Majesty's Life-Guards Cossack Regiment, His Imperial Highness the Sovereign Heir and Tsesarevich's Life-Guards Ataman Regiment, Life-Guards Combined Cossack Regiment, 1st His Majesty's Ural Sotnia, 2nd Orenburg Sotnia, 3rd Combined Sotnia, 4th Amur Sotnia
  - 1st Division of Life-Guards Horse-Artillery Brigade
- 2nd Guards Cavalry Division. Headquarters, St. Petersburg, Fontanka
  - 1st Brigade: Life-Guards Horse-Grenadier Regiment, Her Majesty Empress Alexandra Theodorovna's Life-Guards Lancer Regiment
  - 2nd Brigade: Life-Guards Dragoon Regiment, His Majesty's Life-Guards Hussar Regiment
  - 2nd Division of Life-Guards Horse-Artillery Brigade
- Guards Rifle Brigade. Headquarters, St. Petersburg, Fontanka
  - Life-Guards 1st His Majesty's Rifle Regiment
  - Life-Guards 2nd Tsarskoe-Selo Rifle Regiment
  - Life-Guards 3rd His Majesty's Rifle Regiment
  - Life-Guards 4th The Imperial Family's Rifle Regiment
  - Guards Rifle Artillery Battalion
- Life-Guards Horse Artillery
- Guards Howitzer Artillery Battalion
- Life-Guards Sapper Battalion
- Guards Aviation Company

Guard units of direct subordination as of 1917:

- Palace Grenadiers Company
- Guards Replacement Cavalry Regiment
- Guards Field Gendarme Squadron
- His Majesty's Own Cossack Escort
- His Majesty's Railway Regiment

Also, the following were part of the 23rd Army Corps, Warsaw Military District. Headquarters, Warsaw, Poland.

- 3rd Guards Infantry Division. Headquarters, Warsaw
  - Division HQ
  - 1st Brigade: Life-Guards Lithuania Regiment, Emperor of Austria's Life-Guards Kexholm Regiment
  - 2nd Brigade: King Frederick-William III's Life-Guards St.-Petersburg Regiment, Volynski Life Guards Regiment
  - 3rd Life-Guards Artillery Brigade
- Independent Guards Cavalry Brigade
- 3rd Battery of Life-Guards Horse Artillery

== Ranks ==
Every soldier and officer of the Imperial Guard had the style of the Leib Guard (Лейб-гвардии...) such as Colonel of the Leib Guard (Лейб-гвардии полковник). It is a misconception that the tsar himself functioned as the commander of the Leib Guard regiments since only he and some members of the imperial family could hold a title of colonel (polkovnik) of the Guards. In fact, there were many guards officers in the rank of colonel.

Commissioned officers enjoyed a two-grade elevation in the Table of Ranks over regular army officers, which was later changed to a one-grade elevation—first for the New Guards and later for the rest of the Leib Guard. Following the abolition of the rank of major in 1884, most grades below VII shifted one position upwards and so effectively returned to those of the Old Guards.

Grade, Old Guards	Grade, New Guards	Category	Infantry	Cavalry, Cossacks until 1891	Cossacks (since 1891)
IV	V	Staff Officers	Colonel (Полковник)		
V	VI	Staff Officers	Lieutenant colonel (Подполковник) (until 1798)		
VI	VII	Staff Officers	Premier Major, Second Major (Премьер-майор, секунд-майор) (until 1798)		
VII	VIII	Ober-Officers	Captain (Капитан)	Rittmeister (Ротмистр)	Yesaul (Есаул)
VIII	IX	Ober-Officers	Staff Captain (Штабс-капитан)	Staff-Rittmeister (Штабс-ротмистр)	Junior Yesaul (Подъесаул)
IX	X	Ober-Officers	Poruchik/Lieutenant (Поручик)		Sotnik (Сотник)
X	XI	Ober-Officers	Junior Poruchik/Sub-lieutenant (Подпоручик)		Khorunzhiy (Хорунжий)
XI	XII	Ober-Officers	Praporshchik (Прапорщик)	Cornet (Корнет)	
XII	XIII	Under-Officers	Feldwebel (Фельдфебель)		
XIII	XIV	Under-Officers	Sergeant (Сержант) (1800–1884)	Wachtmeister (Вахмистр)	Junior Khorunzhiy (Подхорунжий)
XIV		Under-Officers			
		Under-Officers	Junior Praporshchik (Подпрапорщик); Senior Unteroffizier (Старший унтер-офицер) since 1800		Wachtmeister (Вахмистр)
		Under-Officers	Unteroffizier (Унтер-офицер)		Uryadnik (Урядник)
		Under-Officers	Gefreiter (Ефрейтор)		Prikazny (Приказный)
		Privates	Musketeer, Fusilier, Grenadier etc. (Мушкетер, фузилер, гренадер и т.д.)	Dragoon, Hussar, Cuirassier, Cossack etc. (Драгун, гусар, кирасир, казак и т.д.)	Cossack (Казак)

== Basis of selection ==
From the 18th century onwards, the rank and file of the Imperial Guard were picked from each annual intake of conscripts. In peacetime, most regiments had a selection criteria based on features of physical appearance such as height and hair colour. The purpose of that tradition was to enhance the uniform appearance of each unit on parade.

For example, the Semyonovsky Regiment's conscripts were picked for their height (the tallest of the Guard Infantry), light brown hair and clean-shaven appearance.

== See also ==
- Imperial guard
- Table of Ranks
- History of Russian military ranks
- Toy army of Peter the Great
