= Order of St. Andrew =

Highest award of Russia

Imperial Order of Saint Andrew the Apostle the First-Called Орден Святого апостола Андрея Первозванного
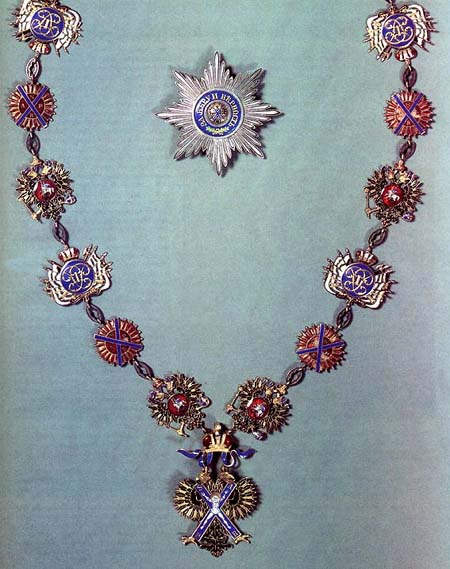

Awarded by Head of the House of Romanov
- Type: Order of chivalry
- Established: 1698
- Motto: За веру и верность (For Faith and Loyalty)
- Status: Rarely constituted
- Sovereign: Grand Duchess Maria Vladimirovna
- Grand Master: Grand Duke George Mikhailovich
- Grades: Knight

Statistics
- First induction: 1698 (Count Fyodor Golovin)

Precedence
- Next (higher): None
- Next (lower): Order of Saint Alexander Nevsky; Order of Saint Catherine
- Ribbon of the order

Decoration with collar (left) and with sash and star (right)

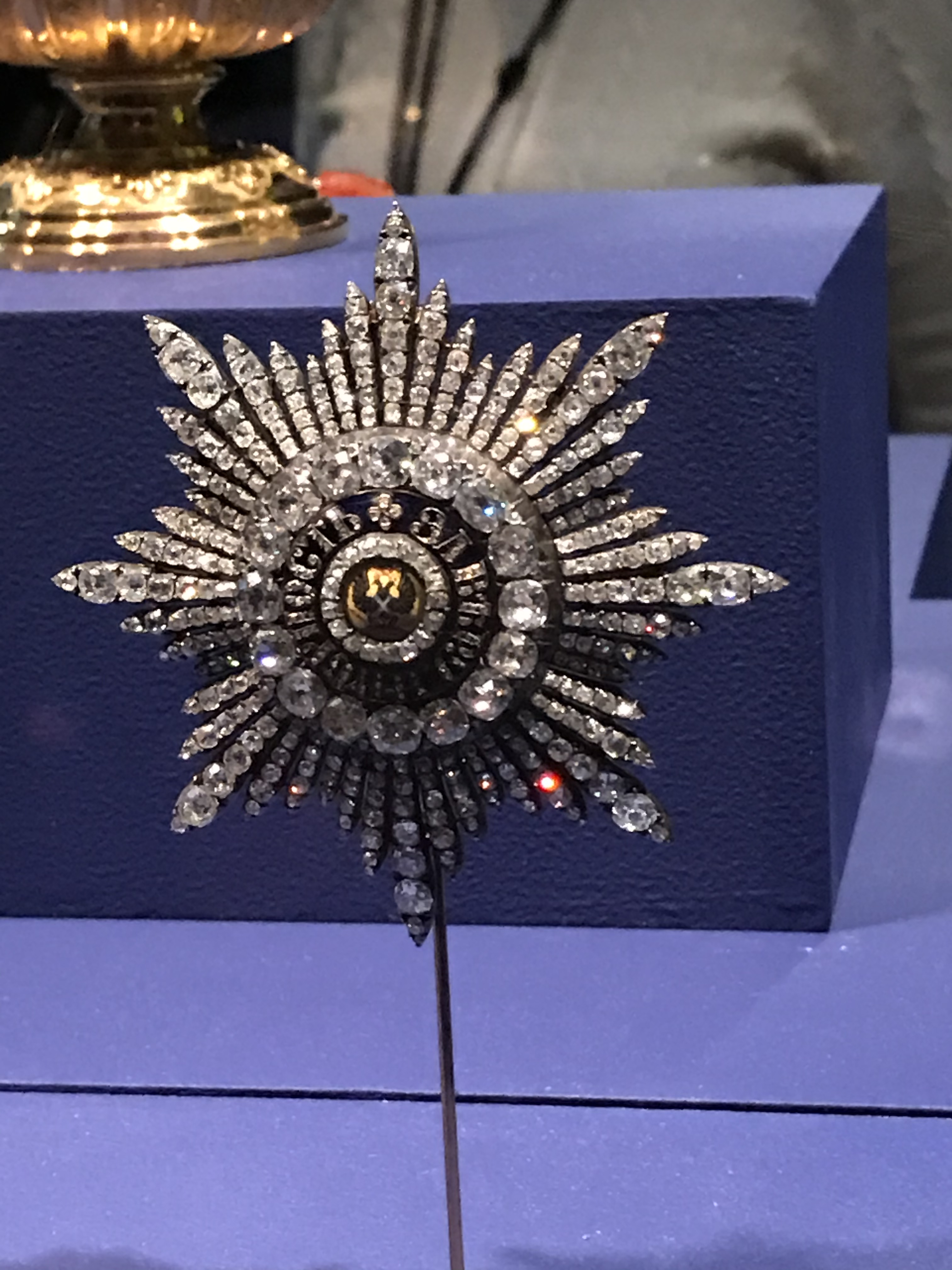
Star of the Order of Saint Andrew with diamonds.

The Order of Saint Andrew the Apostle the First-Called (Russian: Орден Святого апостола Андрея Первозванного, romanised: Orden Svyatogo apostola Andreya Pervozvannogo) is the highest order conferred by both the Russian Imperial Family (as an order of chivalry) and by the Russian Federation (as a state order). Established as the first and highest order of chivalry of the Russian Tsardom and the Russian Empire in 1698, it was removed from the honours system under the USSR before being re-established as the top Russian civil and military order in 1998.

== Russian Empire ==
=== Origins ===
The Order was established in 1698 by Tsar Peter the Great, in honour of Saint Andrew, the first apostle of Jesus and patron saint of Russia. It was bestowed in a single class and was only awarded for the most outstanding civilian or military merit.

Peter learned of the practice of bestowing awards from his travels in the West during the Great Embassy. In the past, service to the Russian state was rewarded with money or large estates. He witnessed first hand the awards ceremonies for England's Order of the Garter and Austria's Order of the Golden Fleece and noticed the loyalty and pride of the awardees. It also saved the state land and money.

Count Fyodor Golovin was the first Knight of the order. Until the Russian Revolution of 1917, just over one thousand awards had been made. During the monarchy, Knights of the Order of St. Andrew also automatically were granted hereditary nobility and received the Order of St. Alexander Nevsky, the Order of the White Eagle, the Order of Saint Anna and the Order St. Stanislaus Knight Grand Cross. Moreover, recipients of lower ranks were automatically promoted to the rank of lieutenant general or vice admiral. The Order of Saint Andrew continues to be awarded by the Russian Imperial House in exile, with most recent investitures having been conferred in 2021. The first post-revolutionary presentation was to Prince Georgy Konstantinovich of Russia on attaining his dynastic majority in April 1923.

Due to a blue riband of the order, the French phrase Cordon Bleu, initially associated with Order of the Holy Spirit, also referred to knights St Andrew's order.

=== Insignia ===
The insignia of the order consisted of:

- Badge: an enamelled crowned black double-headed eagle bearing a blue St. Andrew's Cross (saltire) with St. Andrew crucified upon it; on the arms of the saltire were the Latin letters 'SAPR' ('St. Andrew, Patron of Russia'). It was worn on a pale blue sash over the right shoulder, or on special occasions on an elaborate 'collar' (chain).
- Star: eight-pointed silver star bearing a miniature of the badge on a golden background at the centre, surrounded by the motto "For Faith and Loyalty" (Russian: За веру и верность Za Veru i Vernost') on a blue ring. It was worn on the left chest.

The insignia of the order could be awarded "with diamonds" as a special distinction. Saint Andrew's Cathedral in Saint Petersburg was the chapter church of this order of chivalry.

=== Knights ===
==== List of notable Knights ====
- Sir John Acton, 6th Baronet
- Prince Adalbert of Prussia (1811–1873)
- Prince Adalbert of Prussia (1884–1948)
- Adolf Frederick, King of Sweden
- Adolphe, Grand Duke of Luxembourg
- Prince Adolphus, Duke of Cambridge
- Adolphus Frederick V, Grand Duke of Mecklenburg-Strelitz
- Alois Lexa von Aehrenthal
- Ahmad Shah Qajar
- Albert I of Belgium
- Prince Albert of Prussia (1809–1872)
- Prince Albert of Prussia (1837–1906)
- Albert, King of Saxony
- Albert, Prince Consort
- Archduke Albrecht, Duke of Teschen
- Alexander I of Russia
- Alexander I of Serbia
- Alexander I of Yugoslavia
- Alexander II of Russia
- Alexander III of Russia
- Alexander Kurakin (1697)
- Prince Alexander of Hesse and by Rhine
- Duke Alexander of Oldenburg
- Prince Alexander of Prussia
- Prince Alexander of the Netherlands
- Duke Alexander of Württemberg (1771–1833)
- Grand Duke Alexander Mikhailovich of Russia
- Grand Duke Alexei Alexandrovich of Russia
- Grand Duke Alexei Mikhailovich of Russia
- Alexei Nikolaevich, Tsarevich of Russia
- Alexei Petrovich, Tsarevich of Russia
- Alfonso XIII of Spain
- Alfred, Duke of Saxe-Coburg and Gotha
- Alfred, Hereditary Prince of Saxe-Coburg and Gotha
- Alfred I, Prince of Windisch-Grätz
- Amadeo I of Spain
- Gyula Andrássy
- Grand Duke Andrei Vladimirovich of Russia
- Prince Andrew of Greece and Denmark
- Anna Leopoldovna
- Anna I of Russia
- Duke Anthony Ulrich of Brunswick
- Anton II of Georgia
- Anton Egon, Prince of Fürstenberg-Heiligenberg
- Fyodor Apraksin
- Stepan Fyodorovich Apraksin
- Nikolai Arkharov
- Alexander Armfelt
- Gustaf Mauritz Armfelt
- Prince Arnulf of Bavaria
- Prince Arthur of Connaught
- Prince August, Duke of Dalarna
- Prince August of Württemberg
- Augustus II the Strong
- Augustus III of Poland
- Prince Augustus of Prussia
- Augustus, Grand Duke of Oldenburg
- Pyotr Bagration
- Michael Andreas Barclay de Tolly
- Aleksandr Baryatinsky
- Maximilian de Beauharnais, 3rd Duke of Leuchtenberg
- Vasili Bebutov
- Alexander von Benckendorff
- Levin August von Bennigsen
- Prince Bernhard of Saxe-Weimar-Eisenach (1792–1862)
- Louis-Alexandre Berthier
- Andrew Bertie
- Alexey Bestuzhev-Ryumin
- Mikhail Petrovich Bestuzhev-Ryumin
- Ivan Betskoy
- Alexander Bezborodko
- Aleksandr Bibikov
- Ernst Johann von Biron
- Peter von Biron
- Otto von Bismarck
- Gebhard Leberecht von Blücher
- Yevgeny Bolkhovitinov
- Boris III of Bulgaria
- Constantin Brâncoveanu
- Franciszek Ksawery Branicki
- George Browne (soldier)
- Jacob Bruce
- Duke Louis Ernest of Brunswick-Lüneburg
- Bernhard von Bülow
- Alexander Buturlin
- Friedrich Wilhelm von Buxhoeveden
- Leo von Caprivi
- Prince Carl, Duke of Västergötland
- Carlos I of Portugal
- Infante Carlos María Isidro of Spain
- Carol I of Romania
- William Cathcart, 1st Earl Cathcart
- Catherine I of Russia
- Catherine the Great
- Charles I of Württemberg
- Charles X
- Charles XIII
- Charles XIV John
- Charles XV
- Charles Albert of Sardinia
- Charles Alexander, Grand Duke of Saxe-Weimar-Eisenach
- Charles Augustus, Hereditary Grand Duke of Saxe-Weimar-Eisenach (1844–1894)
- Charles Frederick, Duke of Holstein-Gottorp
- Charles Frederick, Grand Duke of Baden
- Charles Louis, Hereditary Prince of Baden
- Charles Michael, Duke of Mecklenburg
- Prince Charles of Hesse and by Rhine
- Prince Charles of Prussia
- Archduke Charles, Duke of Teschen
- Charles, Grand Duke of Baden
- Alexandra Feodorovna (Charlotte of Prussia)
- Alexey Cherkassky
- Zakhar Chernyshev
- Ivan Chernyshyov
- Piotr Grigoryevich Chernyshev
- Vasily Chichagov
- Chlodwig, Prince of Hohenlohe-Schillingsfürst
- Joachim Chreptowicz
- Christian VIII of Denmark
- Christian IX of Denmark
- Christian X of Denmark
- Chulalongkorn
- Andrzej Ciechanowiecki
- Constantine I of Greece
- Constantine II of Greece
- Adam Kazimierz Czartoryski
- Ivan Delyanov
- Grand Duke Dmitry Konstantinovich of Russia
- Vasily Dolgorukov-Krymsky
- Alexey Grigoryevich Dolgorukov
- Vasily Andreyevich Dolgorukov
- Vasily Vladimirovich Dolgorukov
- Mikhail Dragomirov
- Duarte Pio, Duke of Braganza
- John Lambton, 1st Earl of Durham
- Edward VII
- Prince Eitel Friedrich of Prussia
- Elizabeth I of Russia
- Johann Martin von Elmpt
- Ernest I, Duke of Saxe-Coburg and Gotha
- Ernest Augustus, King of Hanover
- Ernest Augustus, Duke of Brunswick
- Prince Ernest Augustus, 3rd Duke of Cumberland and Teviotdale
- Ernest Louis, Grand Duke of Hesse
- Ernst I, Duke of Saxe-Altenburg
- Archduke Ernest of Austria (1824–1899)
- Fredrik von Essen
- Peter Essen
- Archduke Eugen of Austria
- Prince Eugen, Duke of Närke
- Fuad II of Egypt
- Ferdinand I of Austria
- Ferdinand I of Bulgaria
- Ferdinand I of Romania
- Ferdinand I of the Two Sicilies
- Ferdinand II of Portugal
- Ferdinand VII of Spain
- Archduke Ferdinand Karl of Austria
- Archduke Ferdinand Karl Joseph of Austria-Este
- Prince Ferdinand of Bavaria
- Prince Ferdinand of Saxe-Coburg and Gotha
- William Fermor
- Francis II, Holy Roman Emperor
- Francis IV, Duke of Modena
- Archduke Franz Ferdinand of Austria
- Franz I, Prince of Liechtenstein
- Franz Joseph I of Austria
- Archduke Franz Karl of Austria
- Frederick II Eugene, Duke of Württemberg
- Frederick the Great
- Frederick III, German Emperor
- Frederick IV of Denmark
- Frederick VI of Denmark
- Frederick VII of Denmark
- Frederik VIII of Denmark
- Frederik IX of Denmark
- Frederick August I, Duke of Oldenburg
- Frederick Augustus III of Saxony
- Frederick Christian, Elector of Saxony
- Frederick Francis II, Grand Duke of Mecklenburg-Schwerin
- Frederick Francis III, Grand Duke of Mecklenburg-Schwerin
- Frederick Francis IV, Grand Duke of Mecklenburg-Schwerin
- Frederick I, Grand Duke of Baden
- Frederick II, Grand Duke of Baden
- Prince Frederick of Prussia (1794–1863)
- Frederick I of Württemberg
- Prince Frederick, Duke of York and Albany
- Frederick William II of Prussia
- Frederick William III of Prussia
- Frederick William IV of Prussia
- Frederick William, Elector of Hesse
- Frederick William, Grand Duke of Mecklenburg-Strelitz
- Prince Frederick of the Netherlands
- Prince Friedrich Karl of Prussia (1828–1885)
- Prince Friedrich Leopold of Prussia
- Archduke Friedrich, Duke of Teschen
- Archduke Friedrich of Austria (1821–1847)
- Prince Fushimi Hiroyasu
- Prince Fushimi Sadanaru
- Gavriil Gagarin
- Duke Georg Alexander of Mecklenburg-Strelitz
- George I of Greece
- George IV
- George V
- George XII of Georgia
- Grand Duke George Alexandrovich of Russia
- Grand Duke George Mikhailovich of Russia (1863–1919)
- Prince George of Greece and Denmark
- Prince George, Duke of Cambridge
- George, King of Saxony
- Duke George of Oldenburg
- Prince George of Prussia
- Alexander von Güldenstubbe
- August Neidhardt von Gneisenau
- Alexander Mikhailovich Golitsyn
- Dmitry Mikhailovich Golitsyn the Elder
- Dmitry Mikhailovich Golitsyn the Younger
- Fyodor Alexeyevich Golovin
- Gavriil Golovkin
- Agenor Maria Gołuchowski
- Alexander Gorchakov
- Ivan Goremykin
- Daniil Granin
- Aleksey Greig
- Guangxu Emperor
- Samuel Greig
- Ivan Gudovich
- Iosif Gurko
- Gustaf V
- Gustaf VI Adolf
- Gustav IV Adolf
- Gustav III
- Gustav, Prince of Vasa
- Haakon VII of Norway
- Wilhelm von Hahnke
- Prince Heinrich of Hesse and by Rhine
- Prince Henry of Prussia (1862–1929)
- Heinrich VII, Prince Reuss of Köstritz
- Prince Henry of Prussia (1781–1846)
- Prince Henry of the Netherlands (1820–1879)
- Duke Henry of Mecklenburg-Schwerin
- Heraclius II of Georgia
- Prince Hermann of Saxe-Weimar-Eisenach (1825–1901)
- Iosif Igelström
- Irakli Bagration of Mukhrani
- Ivan VI of Russia
- Archduke John of Austria
- Prince Johann of Schleswig-Holstein-Sonderburg-Glücksburg
- Johann I of Saxony
- John VI of Portugal
- Duke John Albert of Mecklenburg
- Archduke Joseph of Austria (Palatine of Hungary)
- Joseph, Duke of Saxe-Altenburg
- Archduke Joseph Karl of Austria
- Mikhail Kakhovsky
- Karl Anton, Prince of Hohenzollern
- Karl August, Grand Duke of Saxe-Weimar-Eisenach
- Karl Heinrich von Nassau-Siegen
- Karl Leopold, Duke of Mecklenburg-Schwerin
- Archduke Karl Ludwig of Austria
- Karl Philipp, Prince of Schwarzenberg
- Prince Karl Theodor of Bavaria
- James Francis Edward Keith
- Hermann Karl von Keyserling
- Jan Hendrik van Kinsbergen
- Patriarch Kirill of Moscow
- Grand Duke Kirill Vladimirovich of Russia
- Pavel Kiselyov
- Karl Friedrich von dem Knesebeck
- Grand Duke Konstantin Konstantinovich of Russia
- Grand Duke Konstantin Nikolayevich of Russia
- Grand Duke Konstantin Pavlovich of Russia
- Konstantin of Hohenlohe-Schillingsfürst
- Apostol Kostanda
- Wincenty Krasiński
- Prince Kuni Kuniyoshi
- Alexander Kurakin
- Alexey Kurakin
- Boris Kurakin
- Mikhail Kutuzov
- Jacques-Joachim Trotti, marquis de La Chétardie
- Peter Lacy
- Louis Alexandre Andrault de Langeron
- Jean Lannes
- Sergey Stepanovich Lanskoy
- Leonida Bagration of Mukhrani
- Leopold I of Belgium
- Leopold II of Belgium
- Leopold IV, Duke of Anhalt
- George Maximilianovich, 6th Duke of Leuchtenberg
- Sergei Georgievich, 8th Duke of Leuchtenberg
- Nikolai Linevich
- Mikhail Loris-Melikov
- Émile Loubet
- Louis IV, Grand Duke of Hesse
- Louis IX, Landgrave of Hesse-Darmstadt
- Louis XVIII
- Louis Ferdinand, Prince of Prussia
- Louis I, Grand Duke of Baden
- Prince Louis of Battenberg
- Louis Rudolph, Duke of Brunswick-Lüneburg
- Louis Antoine, Duke of Angoulême
- Karl Gustav von Löwenwolde
- Ludwig I of Bavaria
- Ludwig II of Bavaria
- Ludwig III of Bavaria
- Prince Ludwig August of Saxe-Coburg and Gotha
- Archduke Ludwig Viktor of Austria
- Luís I of Portugal
- Luitpold, Prince Regent of Bavaria
- Edwin Freiherr von Manteuffel
- Manuel II of Portugal
- Maria Feodorovna (Dagmar of Denmark)
- Maria Feodorovna (Sophie Dorothea of Württemberg)
- Maria Theresa I, Holy Roman Empress
- Grand Duchess Maria Vladimirovna of Russia
- Maximilian I of Mexico
- Prince Maximilian of Baden
- Michael I of Romania
- Ivan Mazepa
- Duke William of Mecklenburg-Schwerin
- Duke Charles of Mecklenburg
- Emperor Meiji
- Pyotr Melissino
- Alexander Danilovich Menshikov
- Klemens von Metternich
- Peter von Meyendorff
- Grand Duke Michael Nikolaevich of Russia
- Grand Duke Michael Alexandrovich of Russia
- Johann von Michelsohnen
- Miguel I of Portugal
- Mikhail Volkonsky
- Sergey Mikhalkov
- Milan I of Serbia
- Mikhail Miloradovich
- Hugh Henry Mitchell
- Helmuth von Moltke the Elder
- Nikolay Mordvinov (admiral)
- Prince Moritz of Saxe-Altenburg
- Arkady Morkov
- Burkhard Christoph von Münnich
- Joachim Murat
- Mikhail Muravyov-Vilensky
- Valentin Musin-Pushkin
- Ivan Nabokov
- Napoleon I of France
- Napoleon III of France
- Napoléon, Prince Imperial
- Karl Heinrich von Nassau-Siegen
- Ivan Neplyuyev
- Karl Nesselrode
- Leka, Crown Prince of Albania (1982)
- Nicholas I of Russia
- Nicholas II of Russia
- Nicholas Alexandrovich, Tsesarevich of Russia
- Grand Duke Nicholas Konstantinovich of Russia
- Grand Duke Nicholas Nikolaevich of Russia (1831–1891)
- Grand Duke Nicholas Nikolaevich of Russia (1856–1929)
- Nicholas I of Montenegro
- Prince Nikolaus Wilhelm of Nassau
- Peter Obolyaninov
- Michał Kazimierz Ogiński
- Grigol Orbeliani
- Alexey Fyodorovich Orlov
- Oscar I of Sweden
- Oscar II
- Fabian Gottlieb von der Osten-Sacken
- Alexander Ivanovich Ostermann-Tolstoy
- Andrey Osterman
- Mikhail Nikolayevich Ostrovsky
- Archduke Otto of Austria (1865–1906)
- Otto I of Bavaria
- Palladius (Rayev)
- Nikita Ivanovich Panin
- Petr Ivanovich Panin
- Ivan Paskevich
- Paul I of Russia
- Grand Duke Paul Alexandrovich of Russia
- Duke Paul Frederick of Mecklenburg
- Pavel Yaguzhinsky
- Pedro V of Portugal
- Pavel Pereleshin
- Peter I, Grand Duke of Oldenburg
- Peter the Great
- Peter I of Serbia
- Peter II of Russia
- Peter III of Russia
- Peter August, Duke of Schleswig-Holstein-Sonderburg-Beck
- Duke Peter of Oldenburg
- Grand Duke Peter Nikolaevich of Russia
- Philaret Drozdov
- Prince Philippe, Count of Flanders
- Hans von Plessen
- Konstantin Pobedonostsev
- Stanisław August Poniatowski
- Grigory Potemkin
- Antoni Michał Potocki
- Stanisław Szczęsny Potocki
- Carlo Andrea Pozzo di Borgo
- Prince Frederick William of Hesse-Kassel
- Alexander Prozorovsky
- Yevfimiy Putyatin
- Bahman Mirza Qajar
- Mohammad Ali Shah Qajar
- Mohammad Shah Qajar
- Mohammad Taqi Mirza Rokn ed-Dowleh
- Mozaffar ad-Din Shah Qajar
- Naser al-Din Shah Qajar
- Karol Stanisław Radziwiłł (1734–1790)
- Archduke Rainer Ferdinand of Austria
- Kirill Razumovski
- Alexei Razumovsky
- Michel-Louis-Étienne Regnaud de Saint-Jean d'Angély
- Anikita Repnin
- Nikolai Vasilyeich Repnin
- Armand-Emmanuel de Vignerot du Plessis, duc de Richelieu
- Roman Vorontsov
- Grand Duke George Mikhailovich of Russia
- Christopher Roop
- Fyodor Rostopchin
- Prince Rudolf of Liechtenstein
- Rudolf, Crown Prince of Austria
- Alexander Rumyantsev
- Pyotr Rumyantsev
- François-Emmanuel Guignard, comte de Saint-Priest
- Nikolai Saltykov
- Pyotr Saltykov
- Alexander Samoylov
- Jan Kazimierz Sapieha the Elder
- Grand Duke Sergei Alexandrovich of Russia
- Yakov Shakhovskoy
- Boris Sheremetev
- Pyotr Sheremetev
- Alexander Shuvalov
- Ivan Shuvalov
- Peter Ivanovich Shuvalov
- Jacob von Sievers
- Simeon II of Bulgaria
- Mikhail Speransky
- Afrikan Spir
- Grigory Spiridov
- Gustav Ernst von Stackelberg
- Curt von Stedingk
- Archduke Stephen of Austria (Palatine of Hungary)
- Alexander Suvorov
- Emperor Taishō
- Charles Maurice de Talleyrand-Périgord
- Pyotr Aleksandrovich Tolstoy
- Alexander Tormasov
- Jean Baptiste, marquis de Traversay
- Ivan Trubetskoy
- Nikita Trubetskoy
- Umberto I of Italy
- Umberto II of Italy
- Vakhtang VI
- Prince Valdemar of Denmark
- Adam Veyde
- Victor Amadeus of Anhalt-Bernburg-Schaumburg-Hoym
- Victor Emmanuel III of Italy
- Grand Duke Vladimir Alexandrovich of Russia
- Grand Duke Vladimir Kirillovich of Russia
- Pyotr Mikhailovich Volkonsky
- Illarion Vorontsov-Dashkov
- Mikhail Illarionovich Vorontsov
- Prince Waldemar of Prussia (1817–1849)
- Alfred von Waldersee
- Karl Ivanovich Weber
- Arthur Wellesley, 1st Duke of Wellington
- Prince Wilhelm of Prussia (1783–1851)
- Prince Wilhelm, Duke of Södermanland
- Wilhelm I, German Emperor
- Wilhelm II, German Emperor
- Wilhelm, German Crown Prince
- William I of Württemberg
- William II of Württemberg
- William II of the Netherlands
- William III of the Netherlands
- William IV
- Prince William of Baden (1829–1897)
- William, Prince of Hohenzollern
- William Ernest, Grand Duke of Saxe-Weimar-Eisenach
- Peter Wittgenstein
- Friedrich Graf von Wrangel
- Duke Eugen of Württemberg (1788–1857)
- Duke Eugen of Württemberg (1846–1877)
- Aleksey Petrovich Yermolov
- Józef Zajączek
- Zera Yacob Amha Selassie
- August zu Eulenburg
- Nikolay Alexandrovich Zubov
- Platon Zubov
- Valerian Zubov
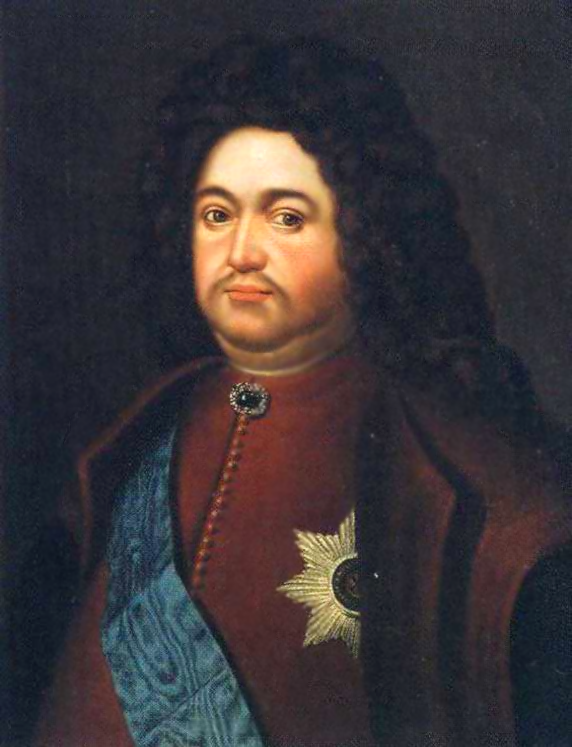
Count Feodor Golovin

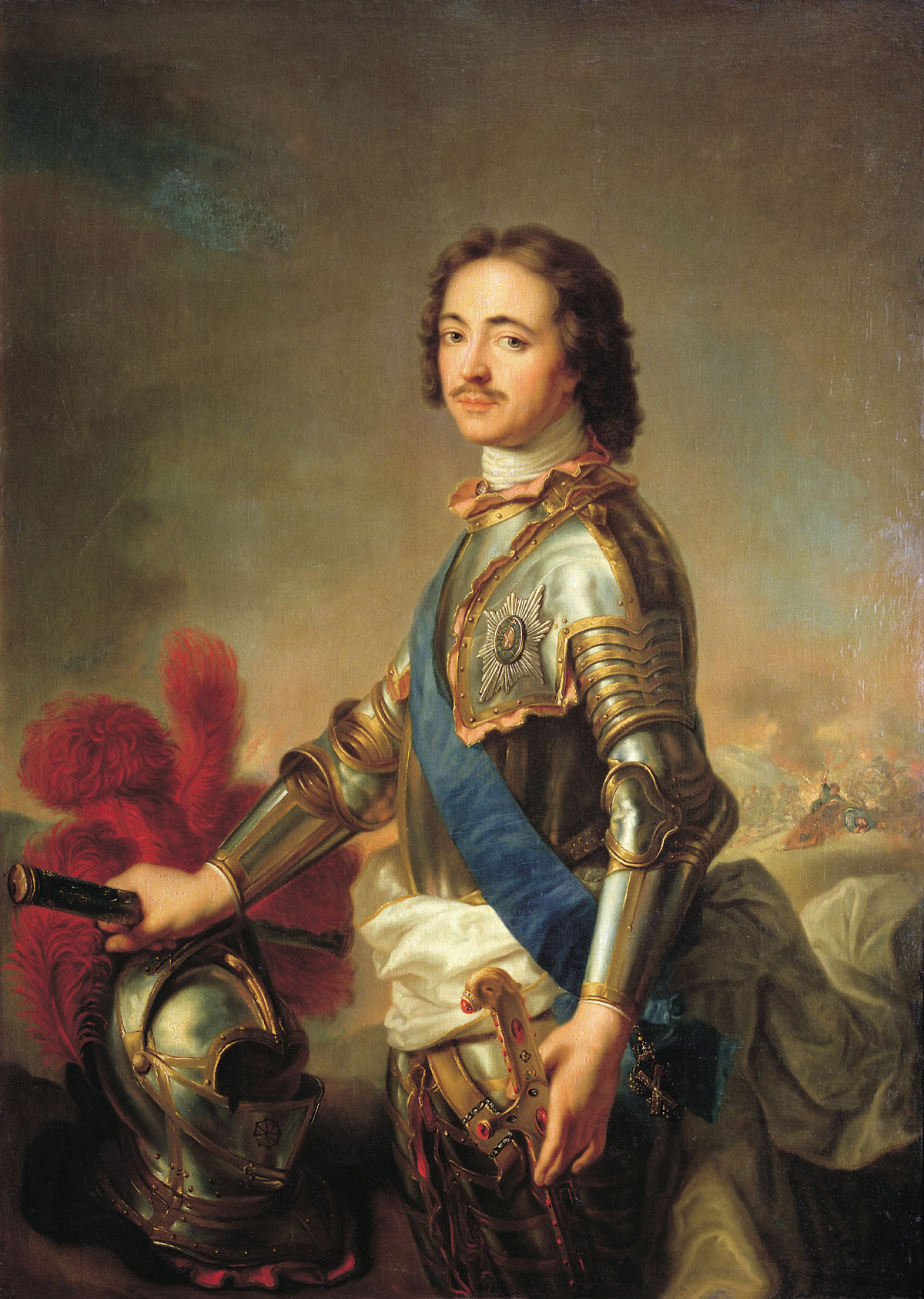
Emperor Peter the Great

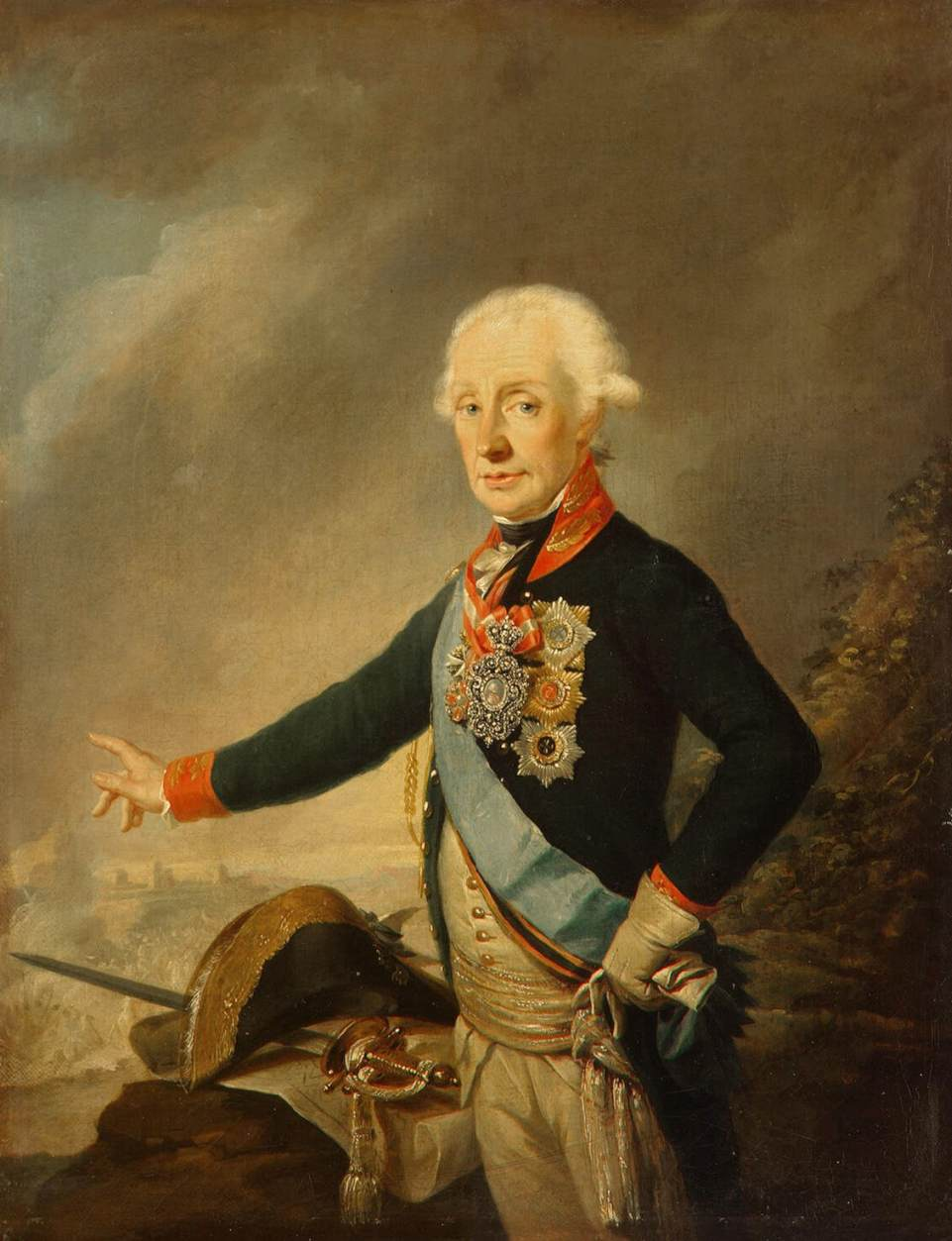
Field Marshal Alexander Suvorov

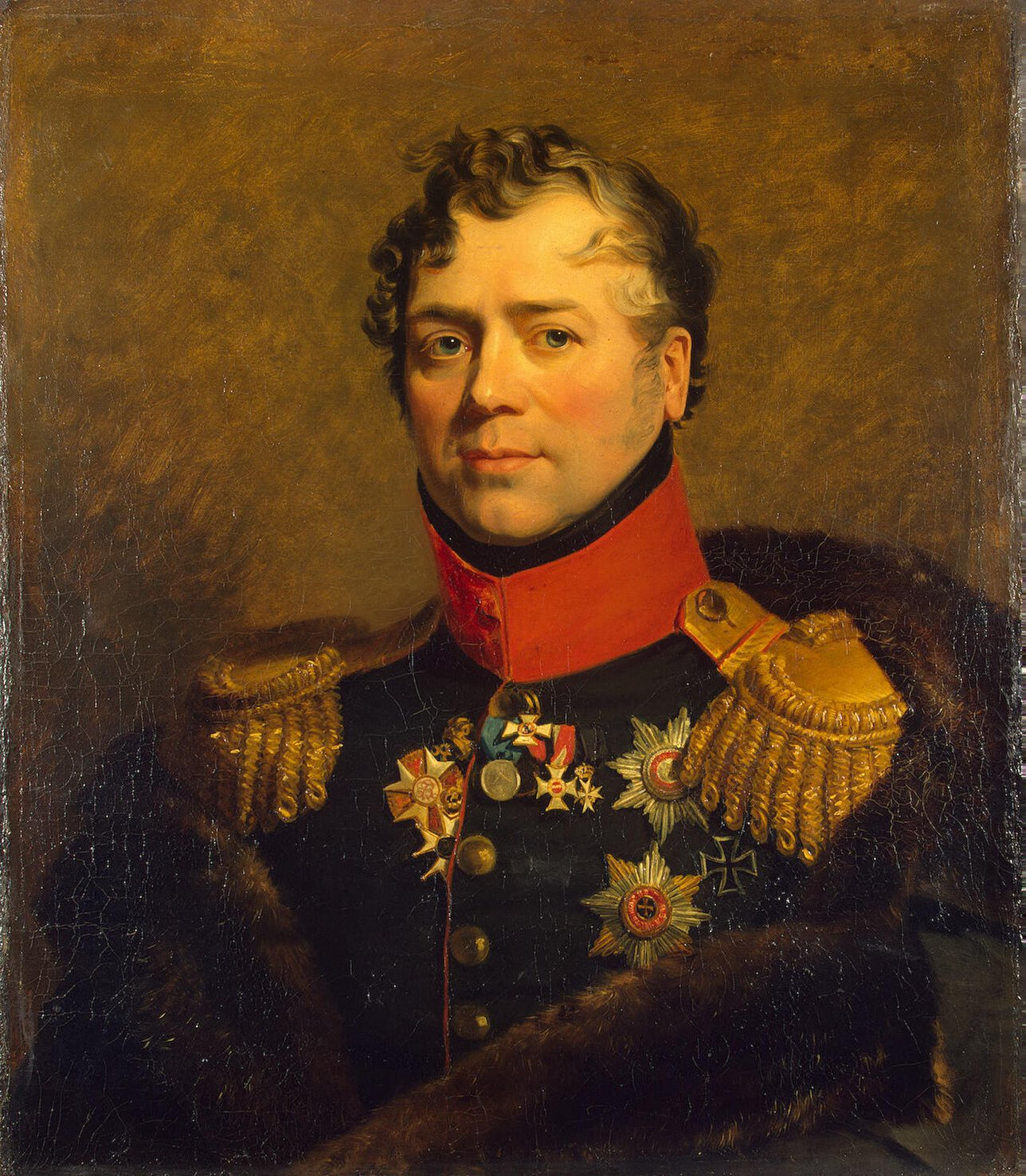
Prince Dmitry Golitsyn

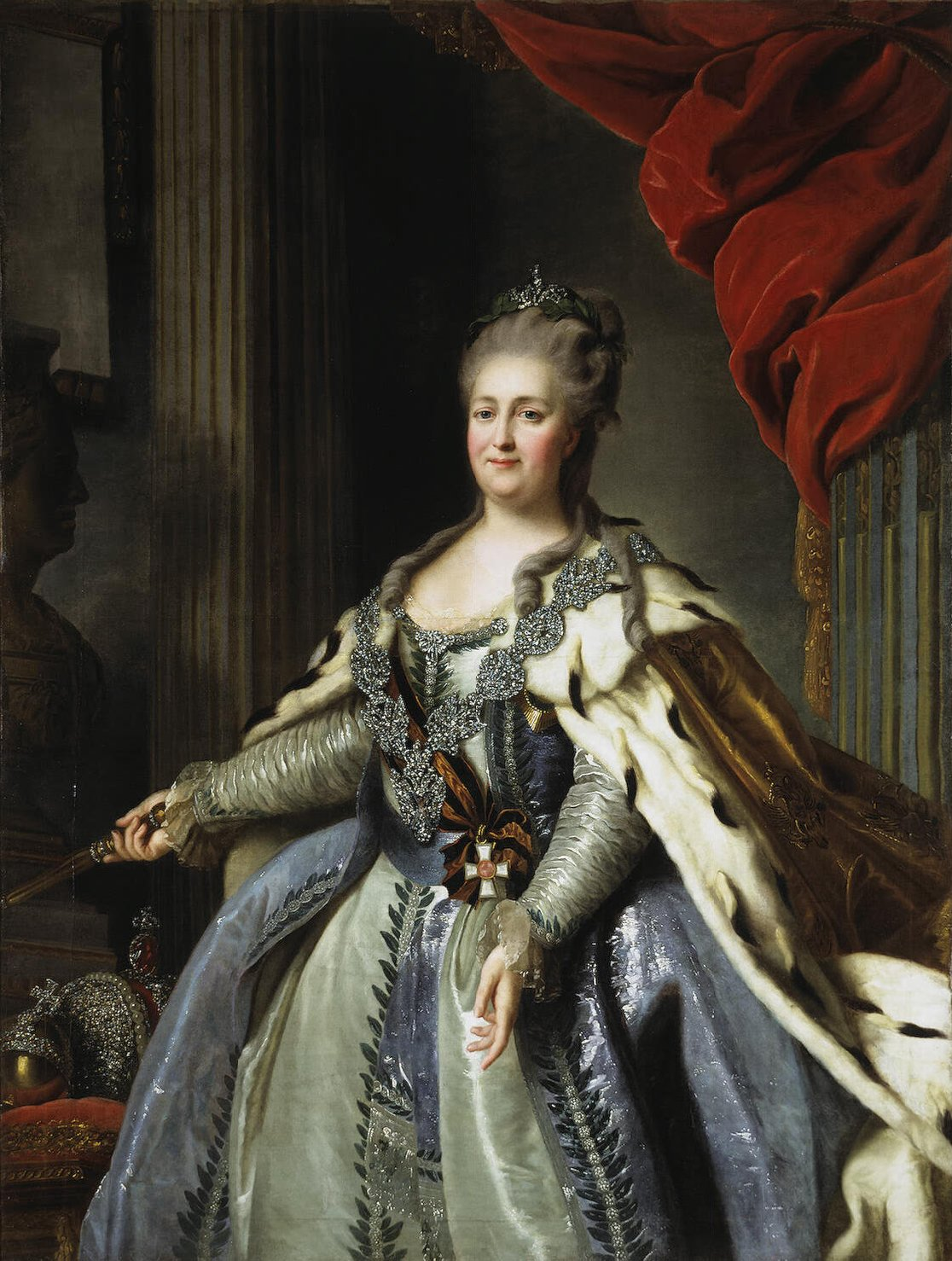
Catherine the Great

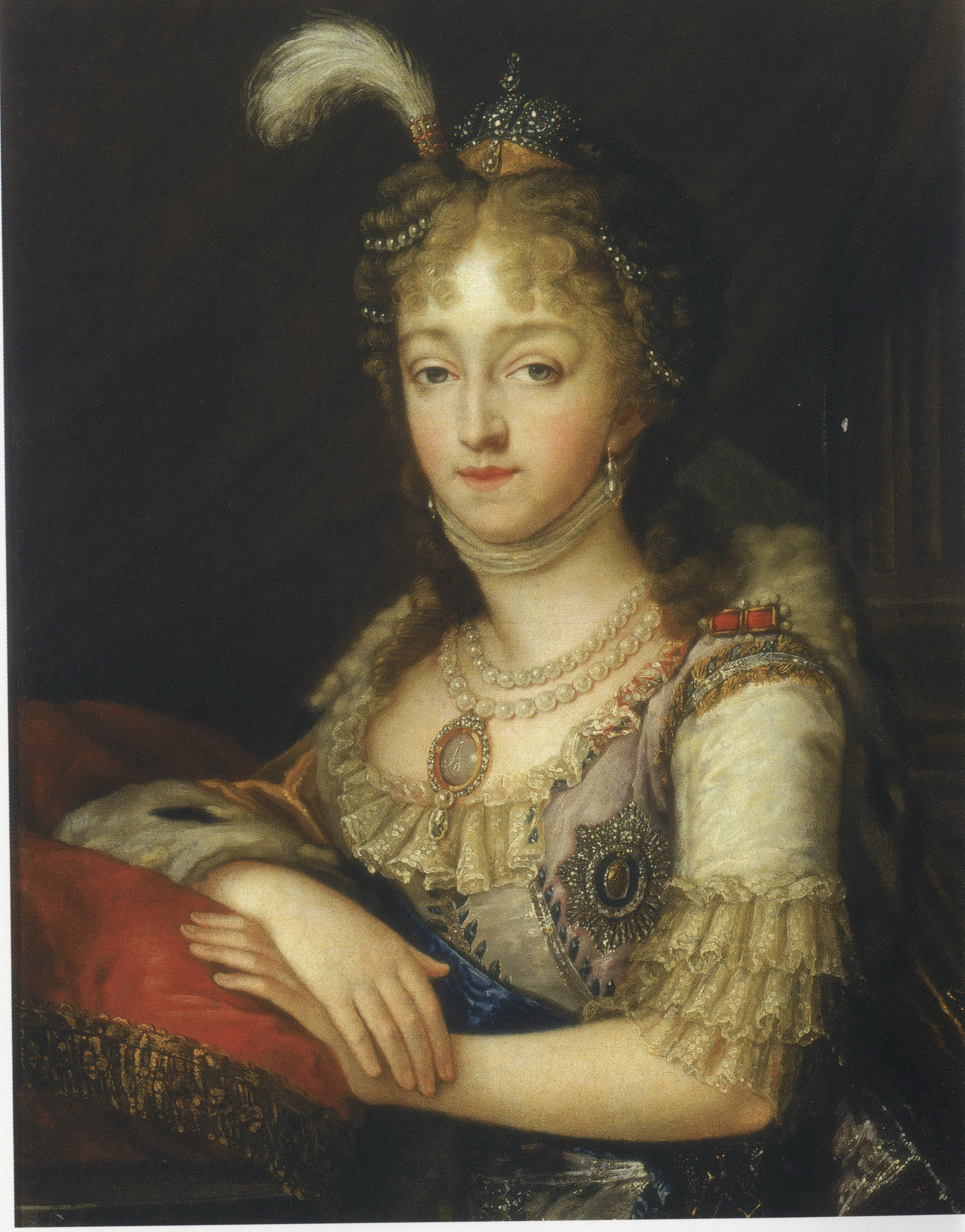
Empress Elizabeth Alexeievna

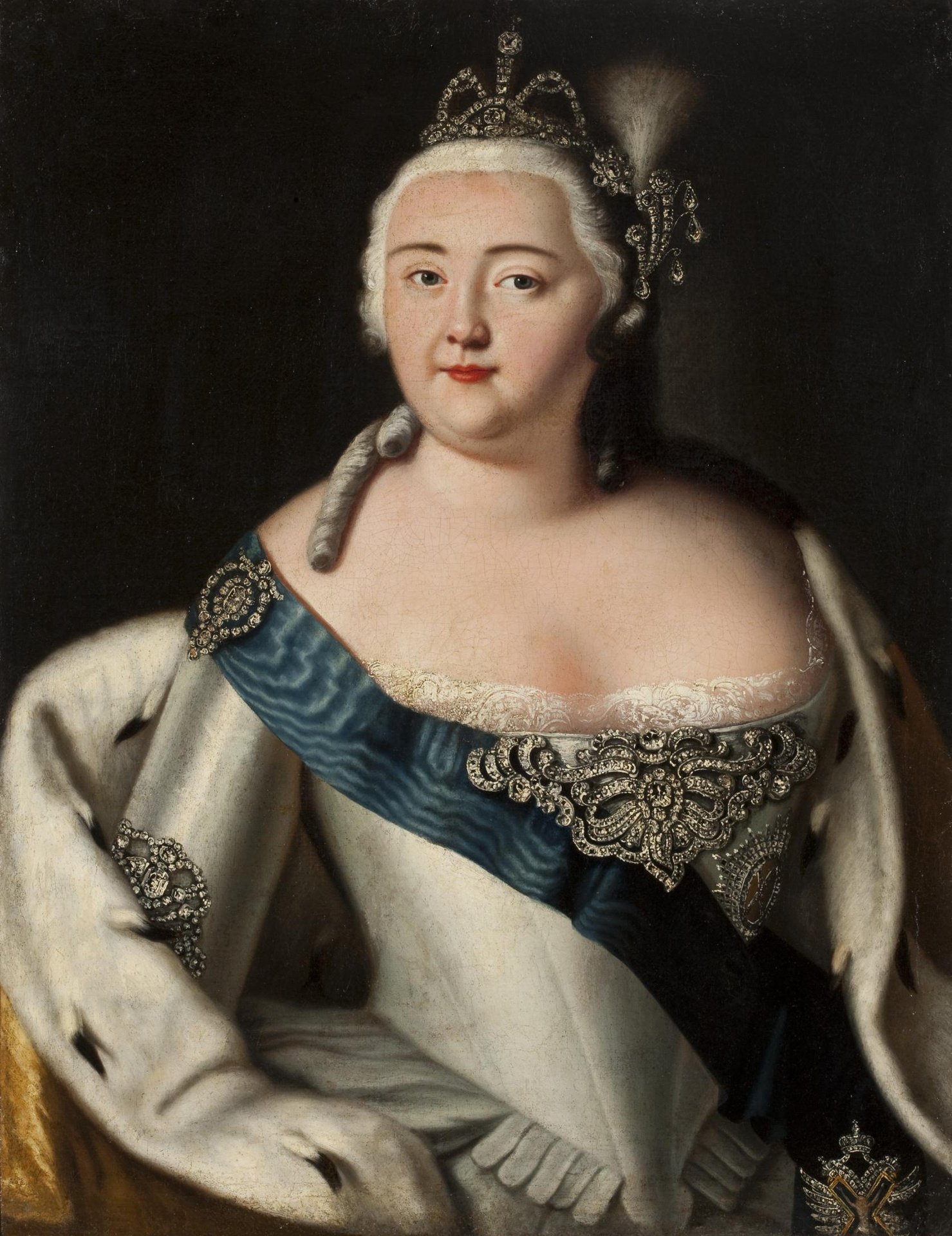
Empress Elizabeth Petrovna (1709–1761)

== Russian Federation ==
Order of St. Andrew the Apostle the First-Called Орден Святого апостола Андрея Первозванного
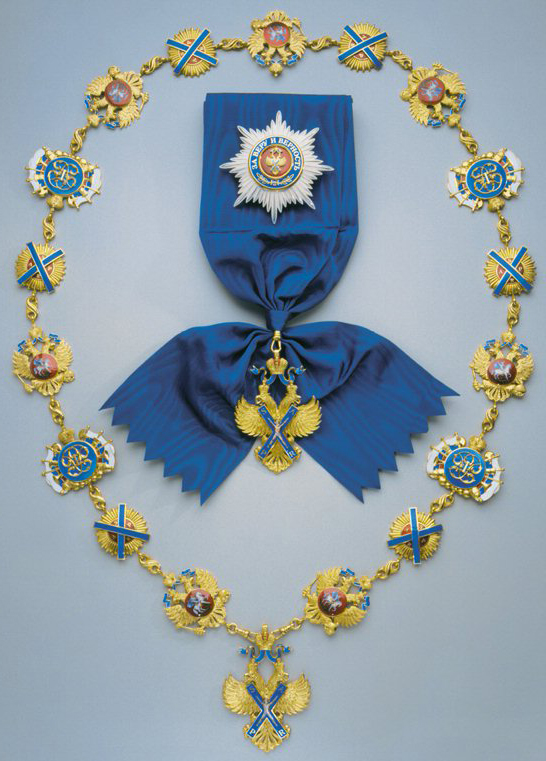

Awarded by the Russian Federation
- Type: Military and Civilian Order
- Established: 1998 (reestablished)
- Motto: За веру и верность "For Faith and Loyalty"
- Eligibility: Prominent State and Public Figures
- Awarded for: Outstanding Service to the State
- Status: Active
- Grades: Grand Cross with Collar

Precedence
- Next (higher): Hero of the Russian Federation
- Next (lower): Order of St. George
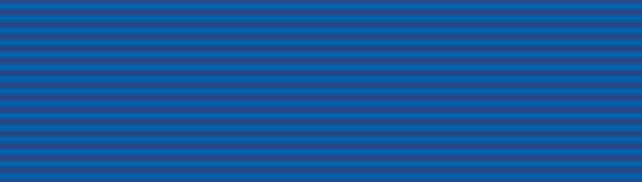
- Ribbon of the order

An order with the same name but with different insignia and statutes was first unofficially re-established by the Orthodox Church of Russia on 27 December 1988. The order was officially re-instated as the highest Russian civilian and military award by Presidential Decree No.757 on 1 June 1998. The Order's award criteria were modified by Presidential Decree 1099 of 7 September 2010.

=== Statute of the Order ===
The Order of St. Andrew the Apostle the First-Called is used to award prominent statesmen and public figures, eminent representatives of science, culture, the arts and various industries for exceptional services, for promoting the prosperity, grandeur and glory of Russia.

The Order may also be awarded to foreign heads of states for outstanding service to the Russian Federation.

=== Insignia ===
The design of the insignia of the modern Order of St. Andrew has changed very little from the imperial design. It consists of:

- a badge (double-headed eagle) attached to a chain (called a "collar") worn around the neck for very special circumstances, or more commonly on a 100 mm-wide blue sash worn over the right shoulder
- a star worn on the left breast

The colour of the sash differs from the colour of the Imperial era, and resembles the shade of the sash of the British Order of the Garter. Members of the military division of the Order have crossed swords added below the crown above the two eagles' heads. On the reverse of the eagle on a white ribbon the motto of the Order appears inscribed in gold letters: «За веру и верность» ("For faith and loyalty").

=== Recipients ===
==== List of notable recipients ====
- Patriarch Alexy II of Moscow
- Fazu Aliyeva
- Heydar Aliyev
- Irina Arkhipova
- Rasul Gamzatov
- Mikhail Gorbachev
- Daniil Granin
- Yury Grigorovich
- Mikhail Kalashnikov
- Patriarch Kirill of Moscow
- Sergey Lavrov
- Vyacheslav Lebedev
- Dmitry Likhachev
- Aleksandr Lukashenko
- Valentina Matviyenko
- Nikita Mikhalkov
- Sergey Mikhalkov
- Narendra Modi
- Nursultan Nazarbayev
- Aleksandra Pakhmutova
- Boris Petrovsky
- Mintimer Shaimiev
- Sergei Shoigu
- Valery Shumakov
- Aleksandr Solzhenitsyn
- Xi Jinping
- Herbert Yefremov
- Valery Zorkin
- Lyudmila Zykina

==== Gallery ====
Select recipients:

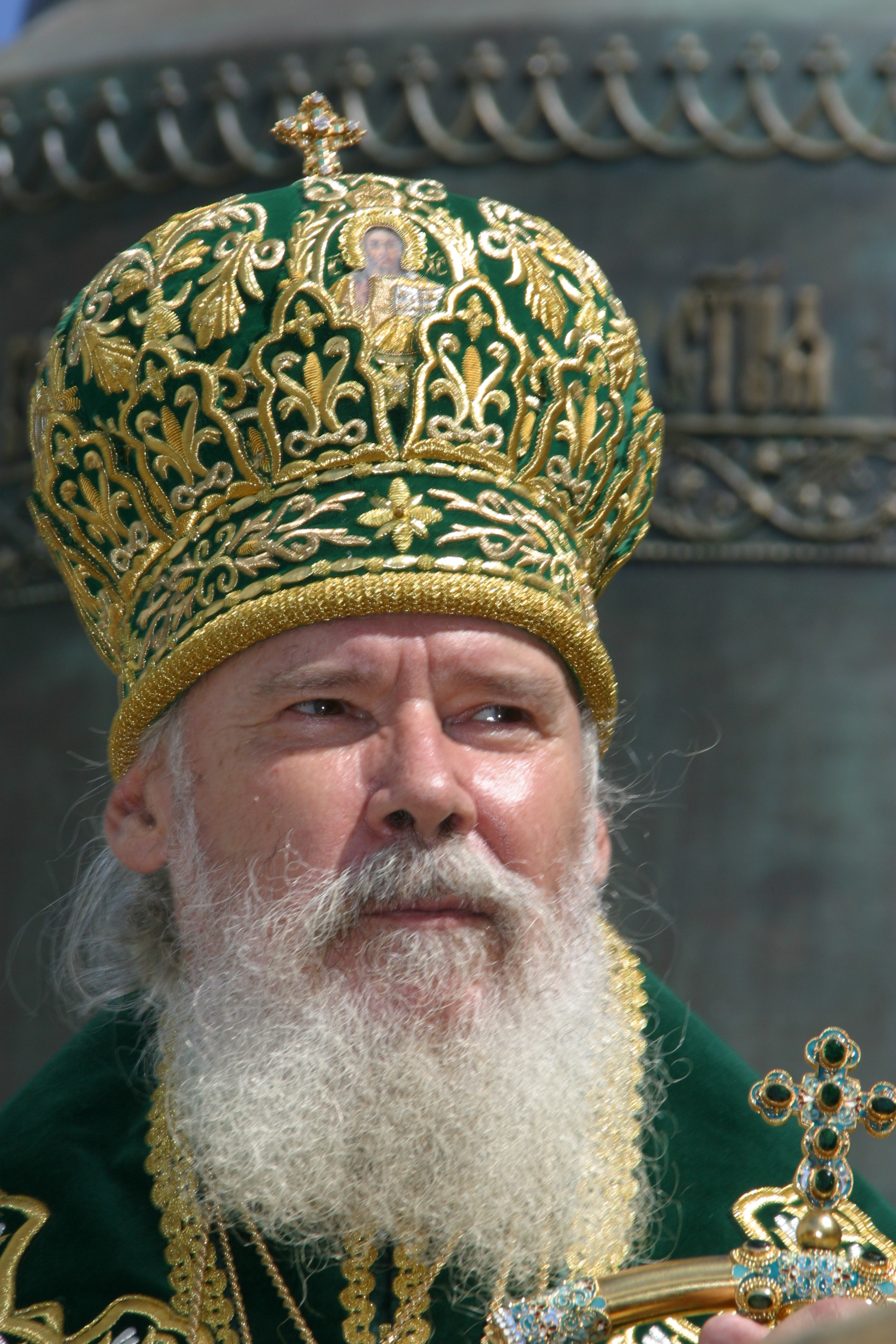
Patriarch Alexy II of Moscow

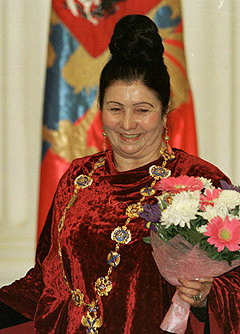
Poet Fazu Aliyeva

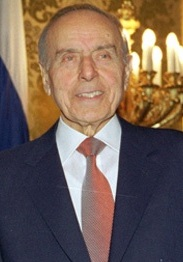
Heydar Aliyev, President of Azerbaijan

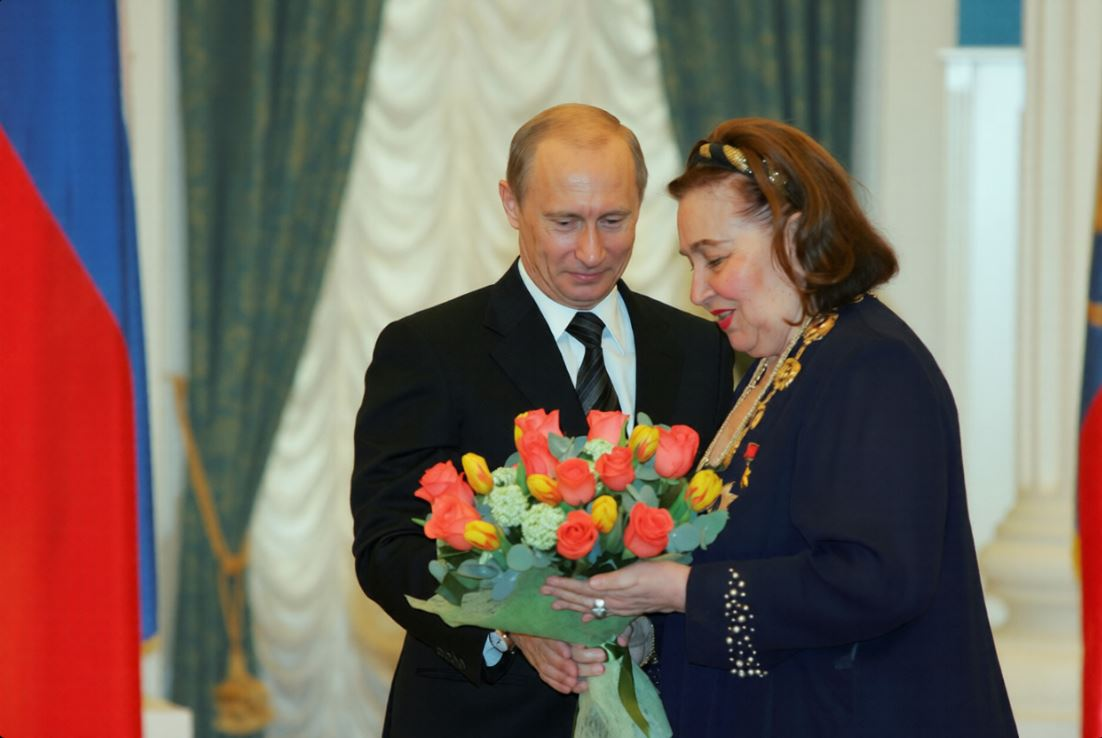
Opera singer Irina Arkhipova

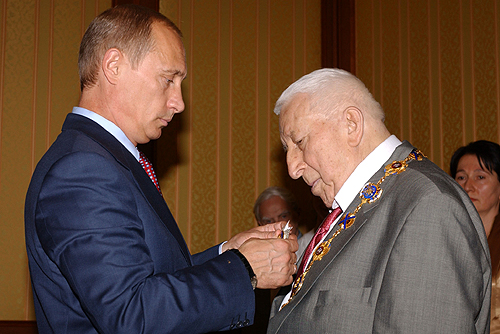
Poet Rasul Gamzatov

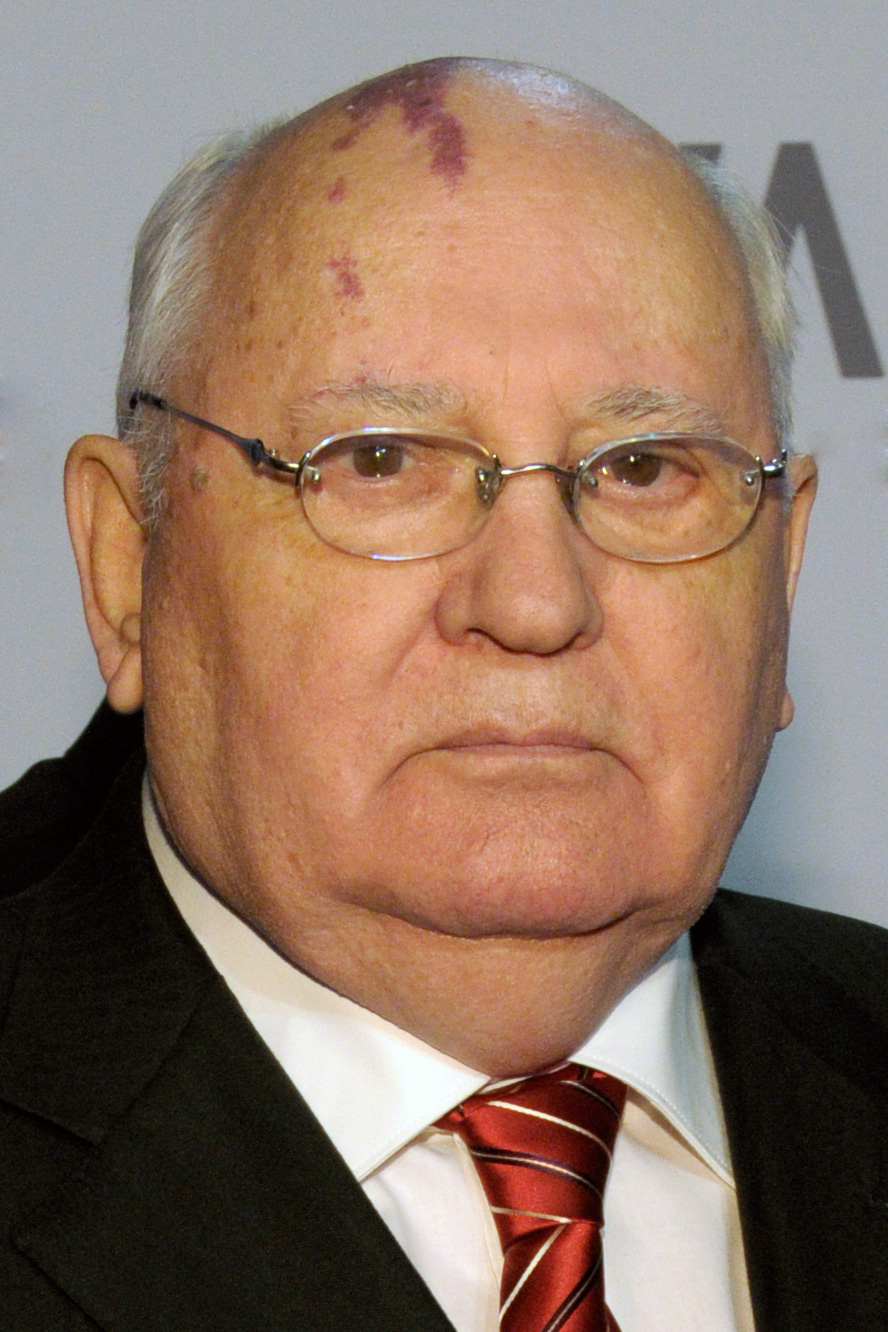
Mikhail Gorbachev, President of the Soviet Union

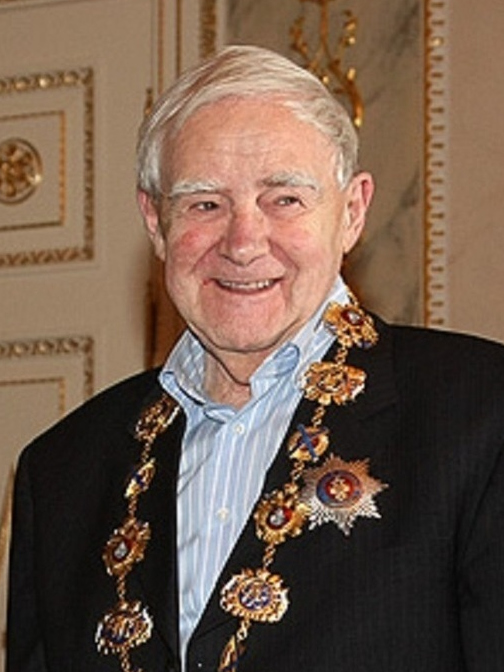
Author Daniil Granin

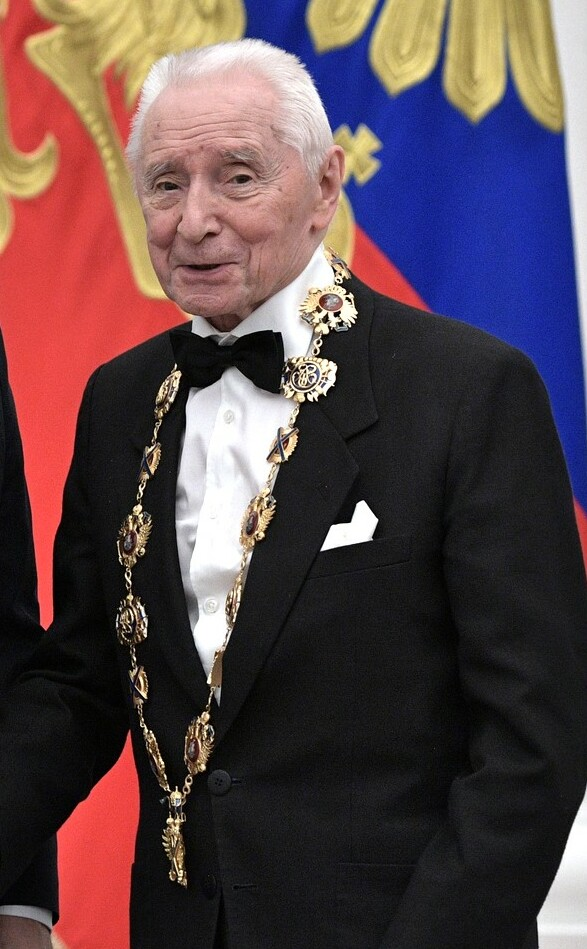
Dancer and choreographer Yury Grigorovich

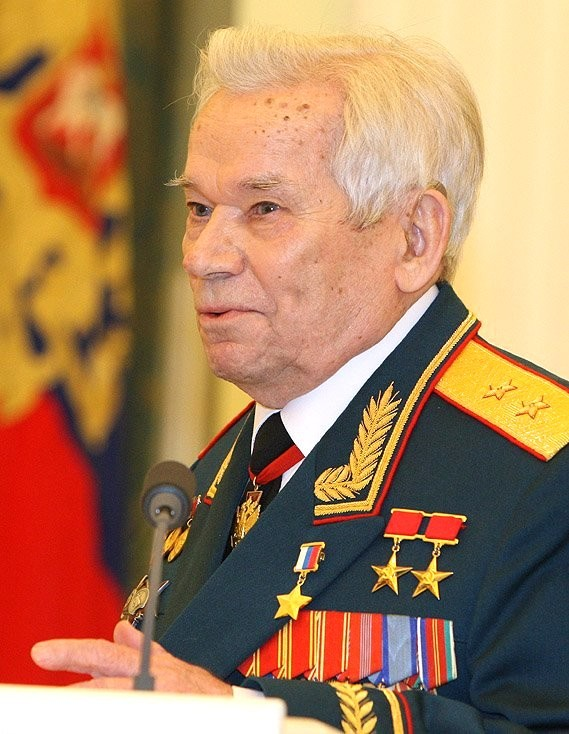
Gun designer Mikhail Kalashnikov

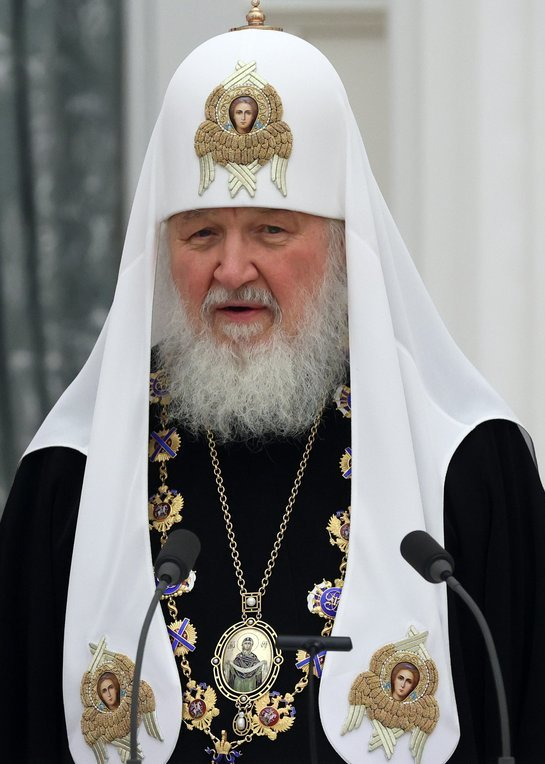
Patriarch Kirill I of Moscow

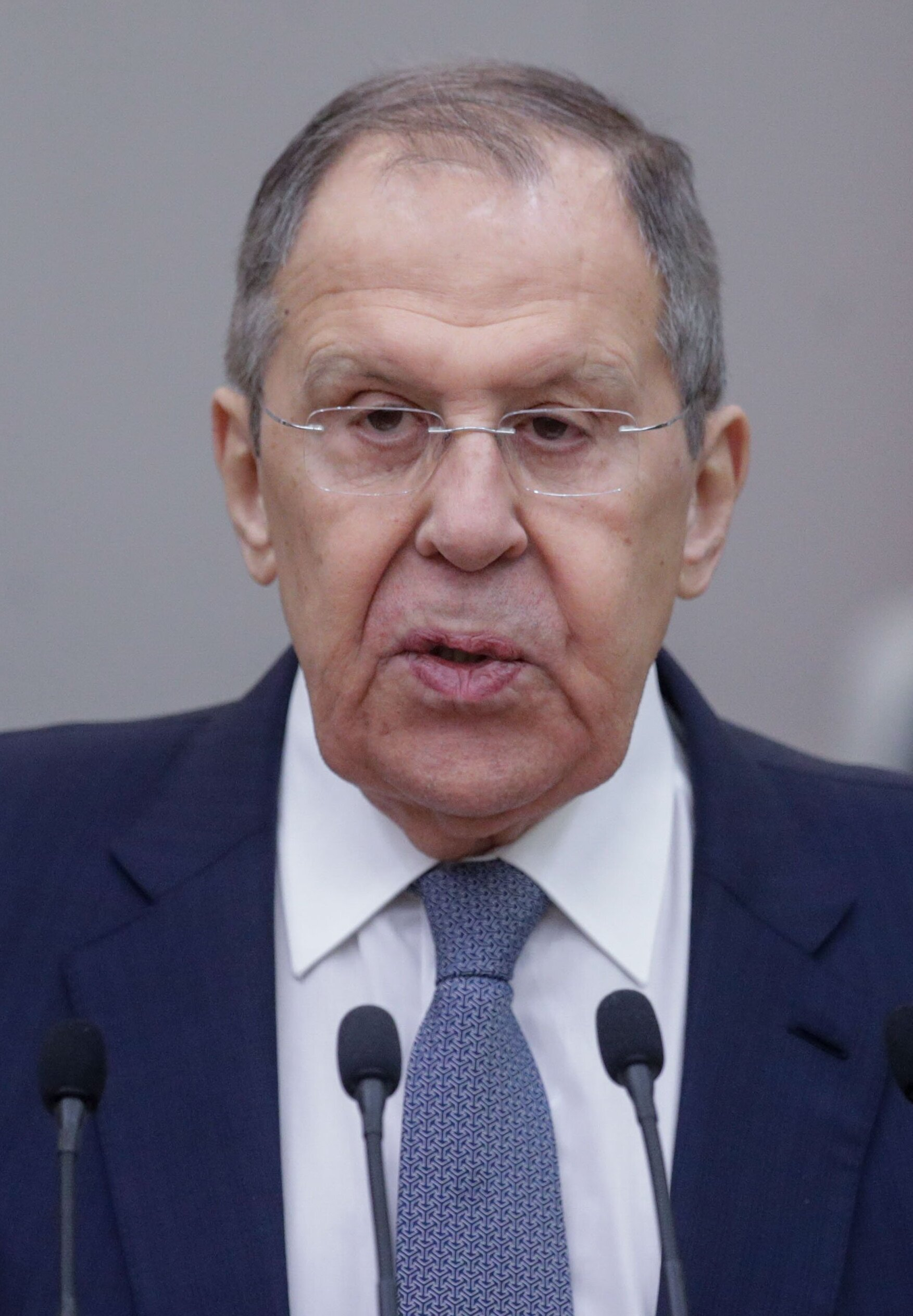
Sergey Lavrov, Minister of Foreign Affairs of Russia

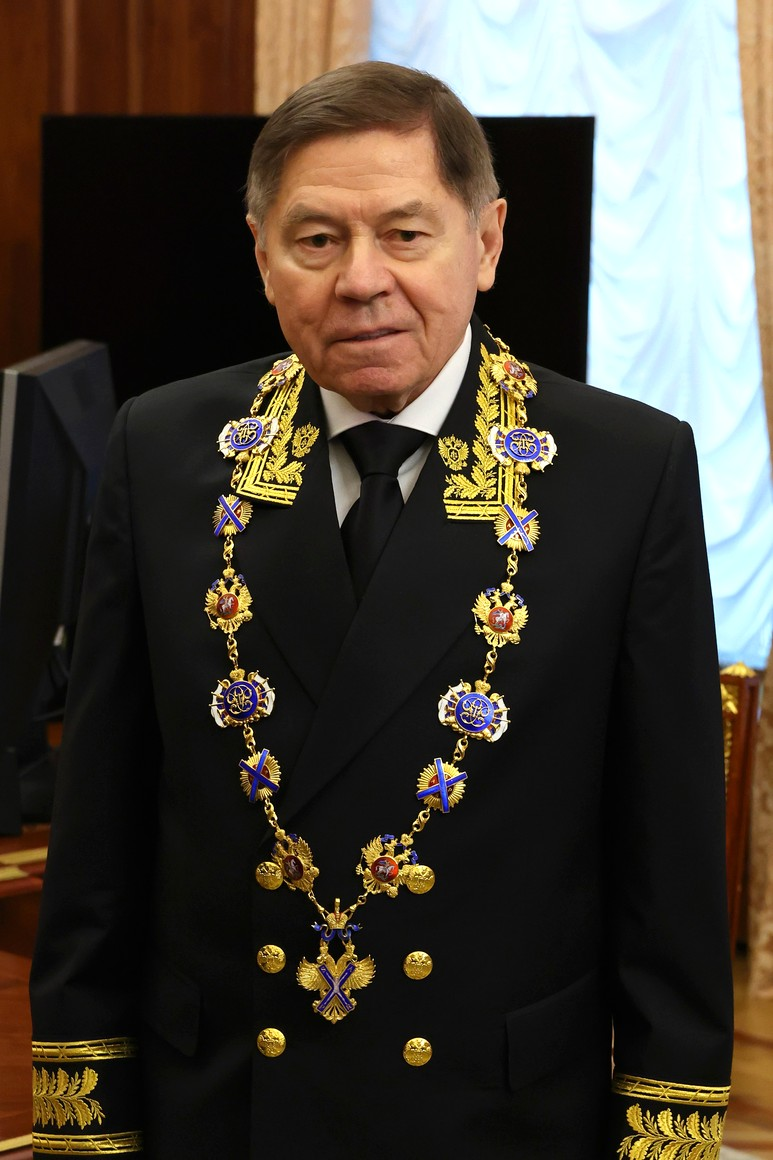
Vyacheslav Lebedev, Chief Justice of Russia

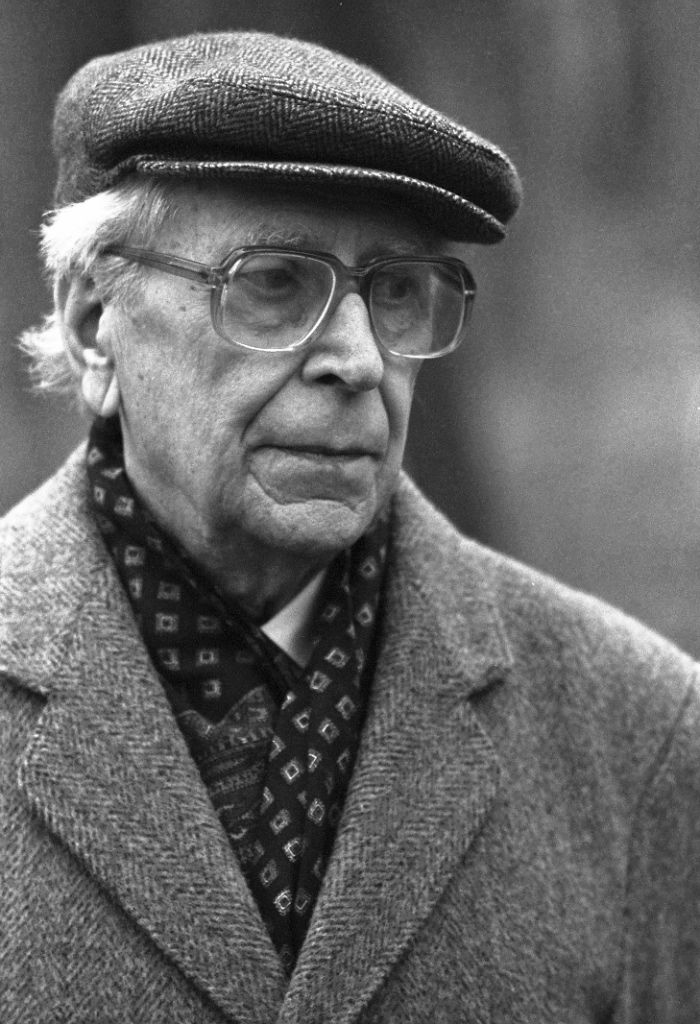
Scholar of the Old Russian language and its literature Dmitry Likhachev

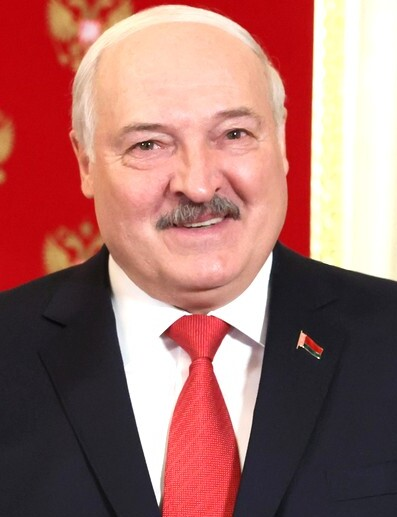
Alexander Lukashenko, President of Belarus

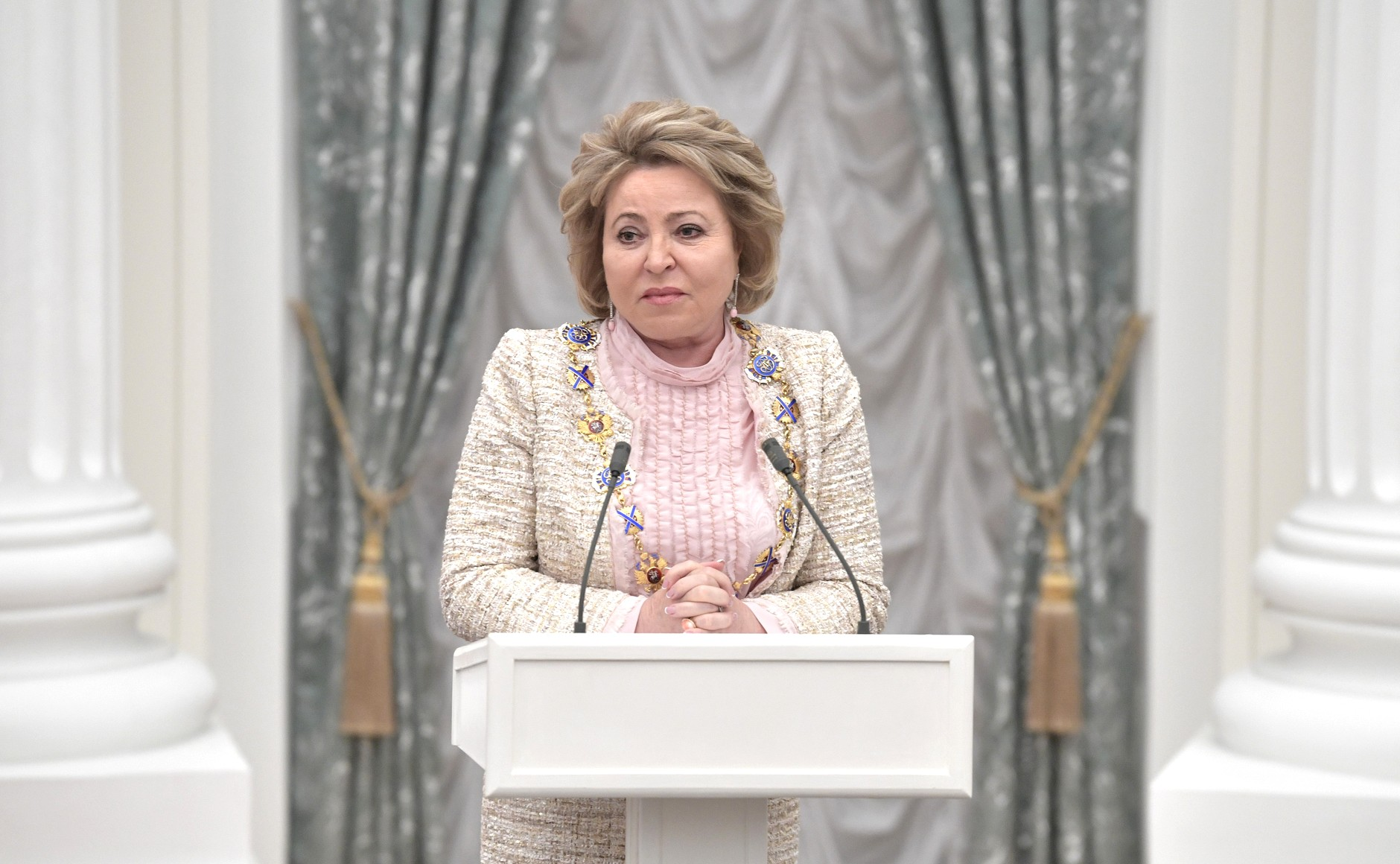
Valentina Matviyenko, Chairwoman of the Federation Council of Russia

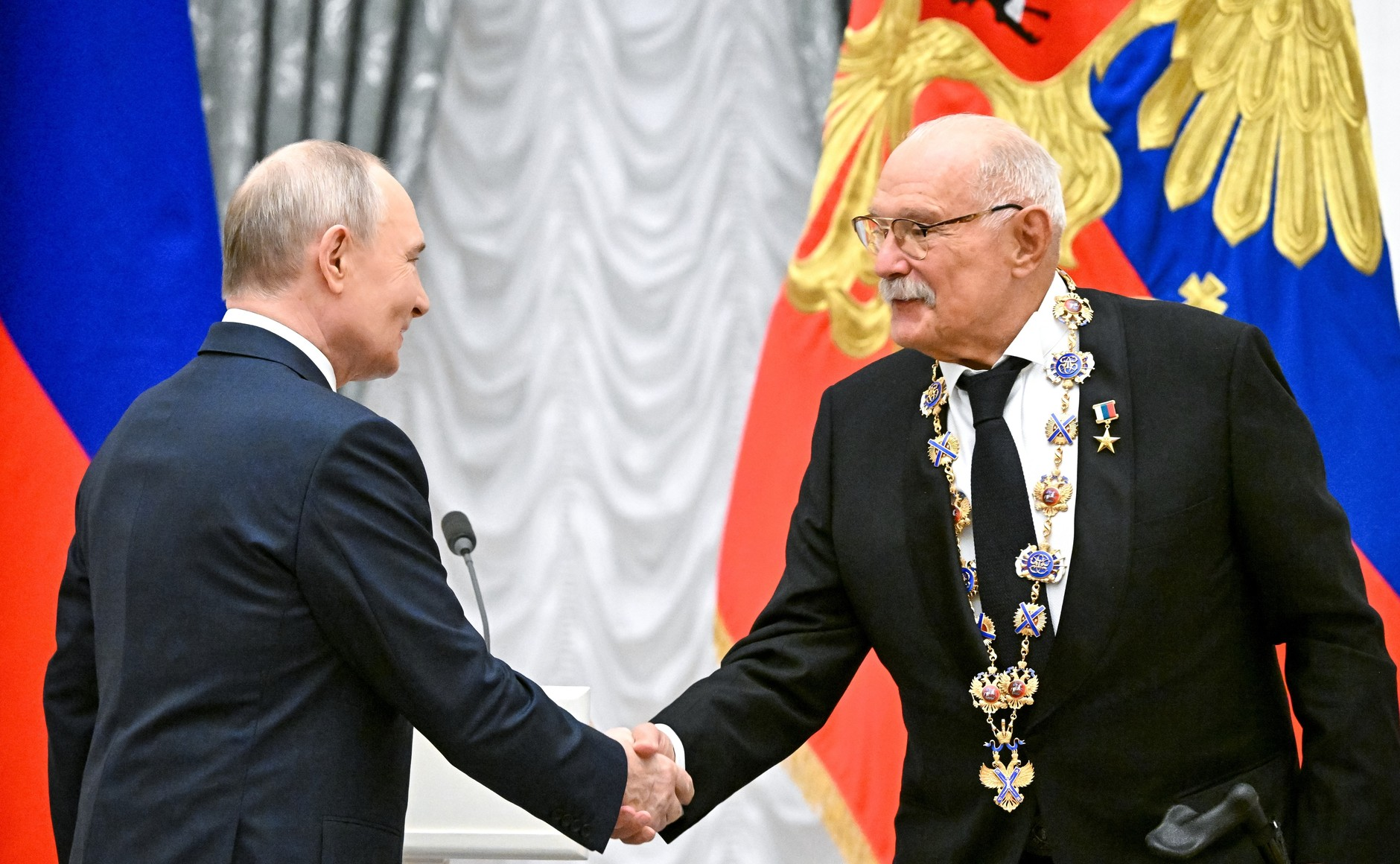
Filmmaker Nikita Mikhalkov

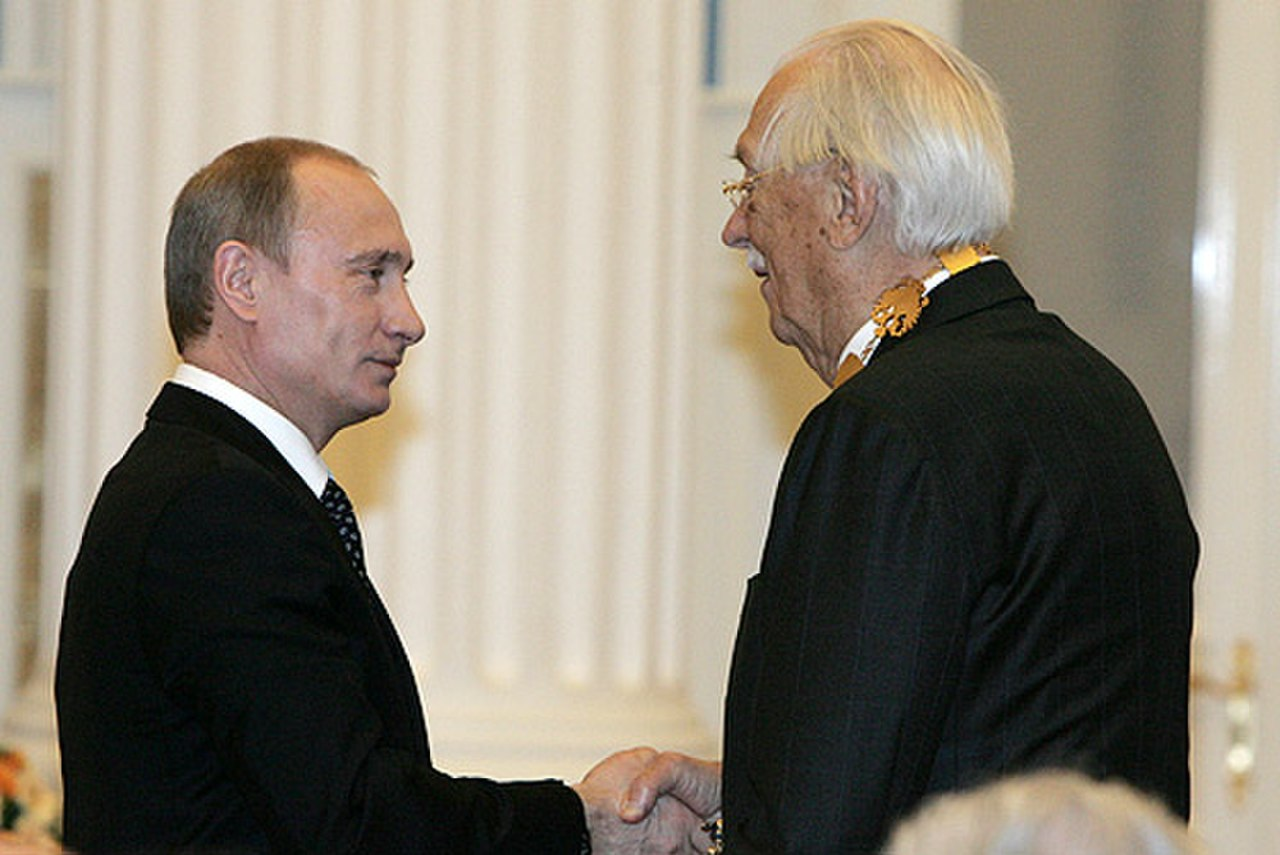
Author Sergey Mikhalkov

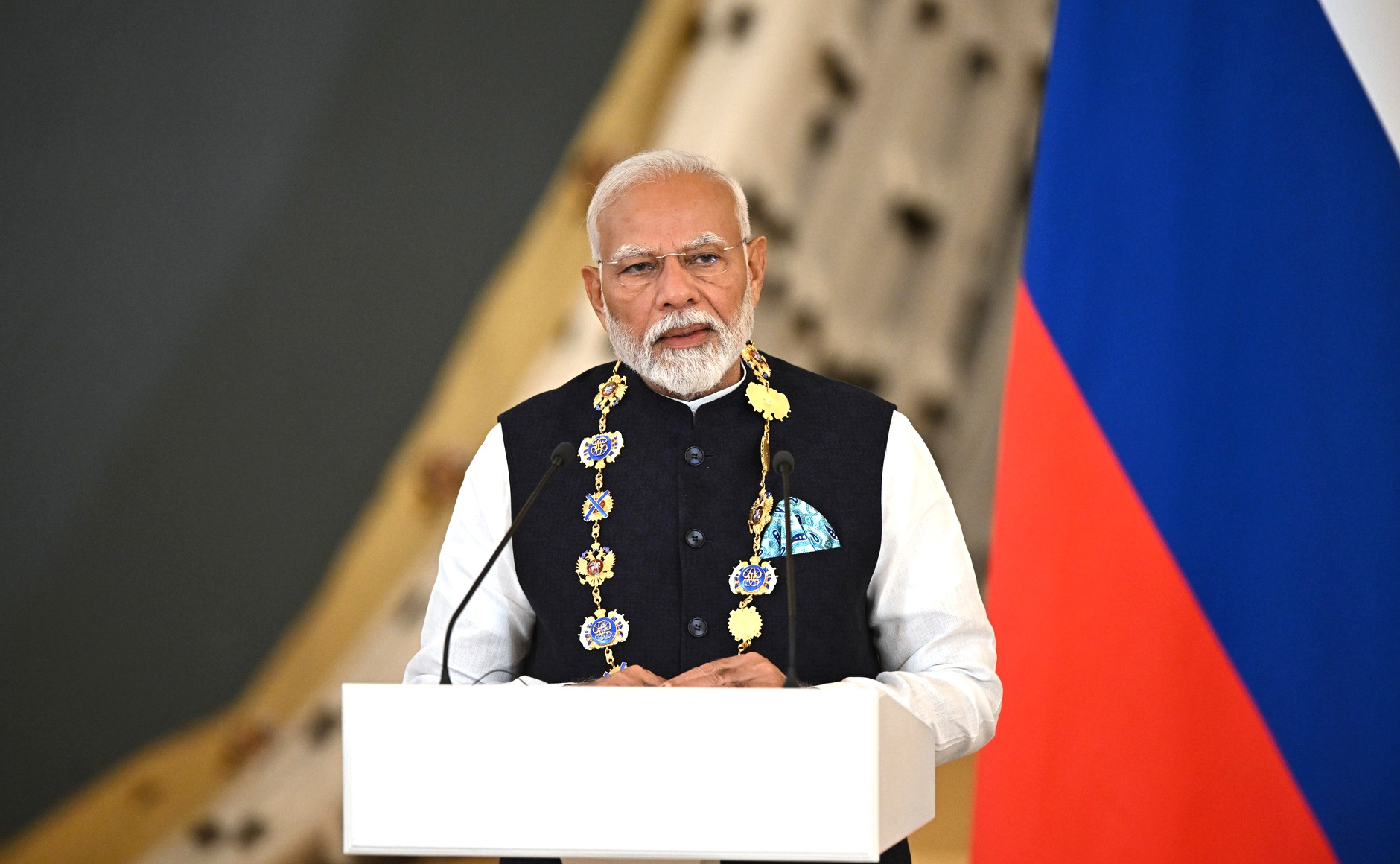
Narendra Modi, Prime Minister of India

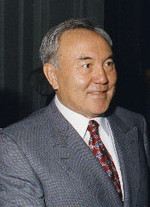
Nursultan Nazarbayev, President of Kazakhstan

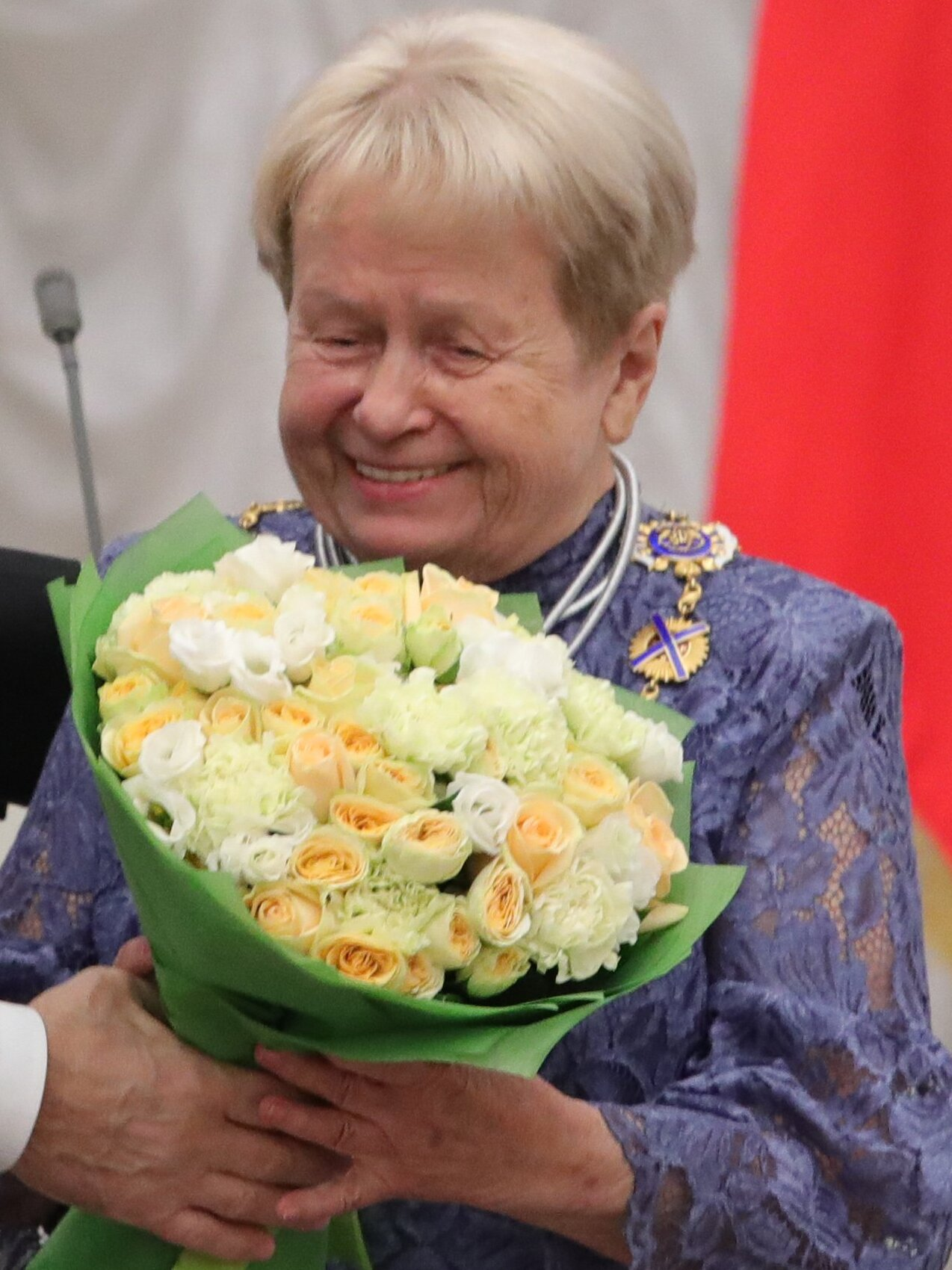
Composer Aleksandra Pakhmutova

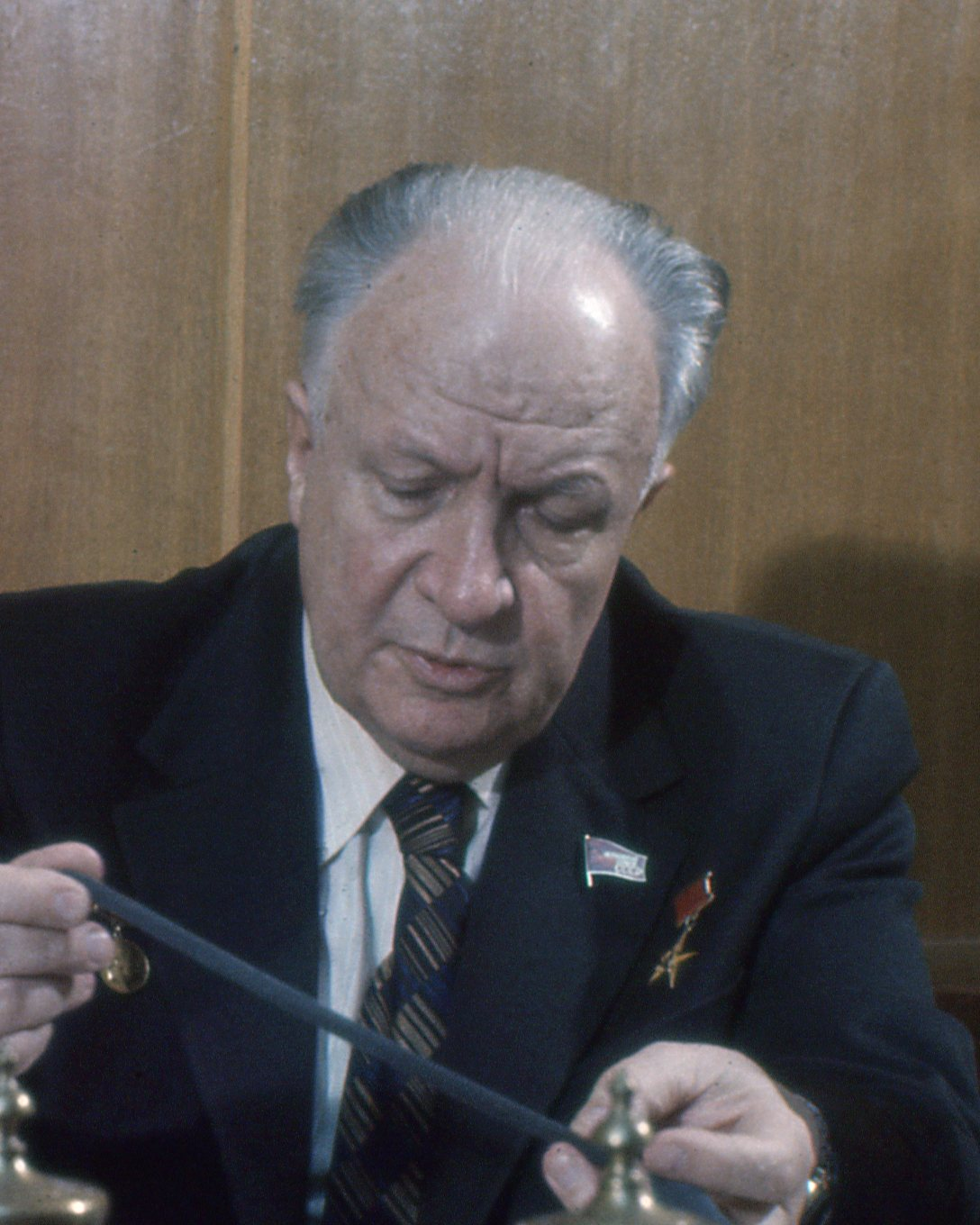
General surgeon, health minister of the Soviet Union Boris Petrovsky

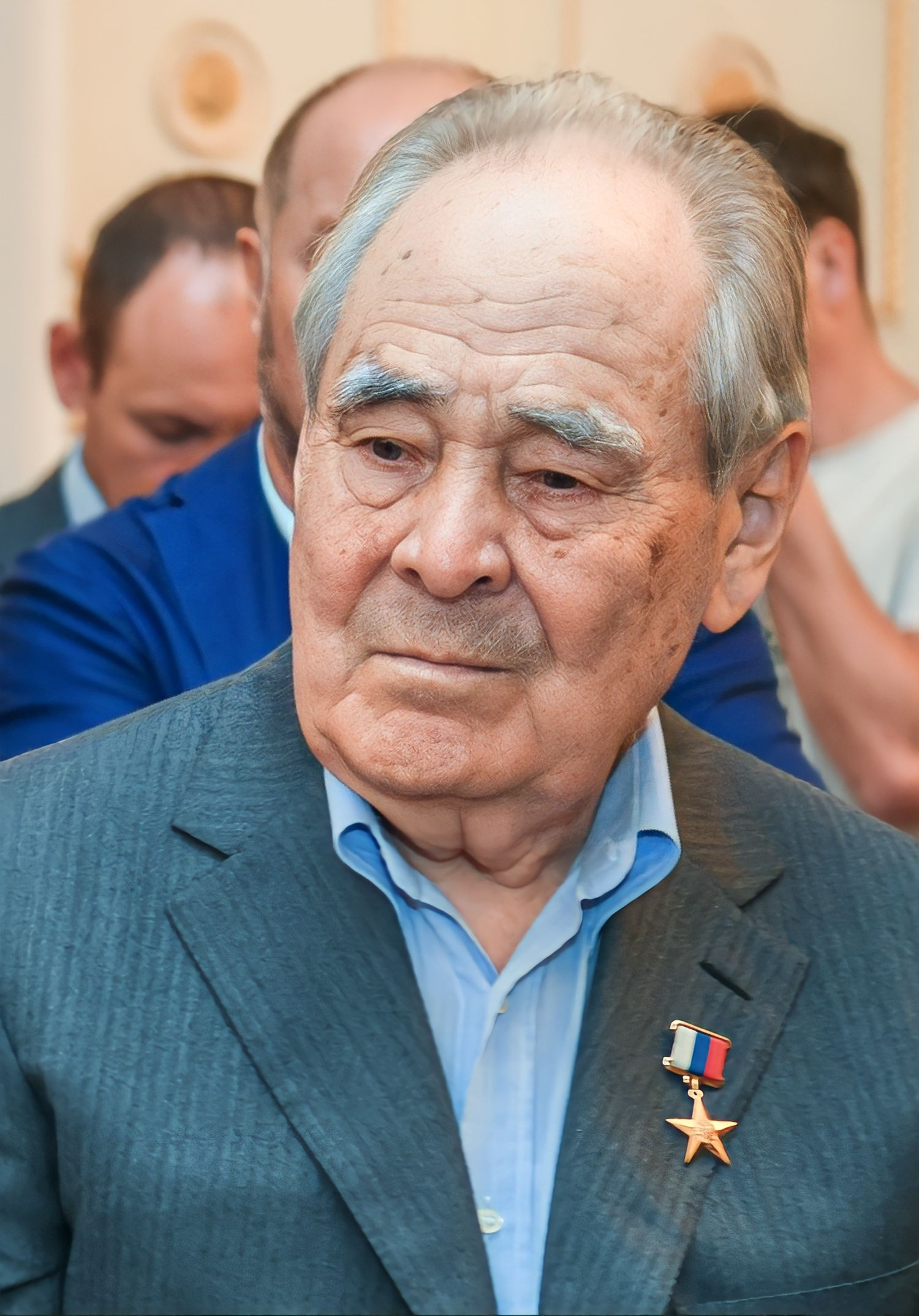
Mintimer Shaimiev, President of Tatarstan

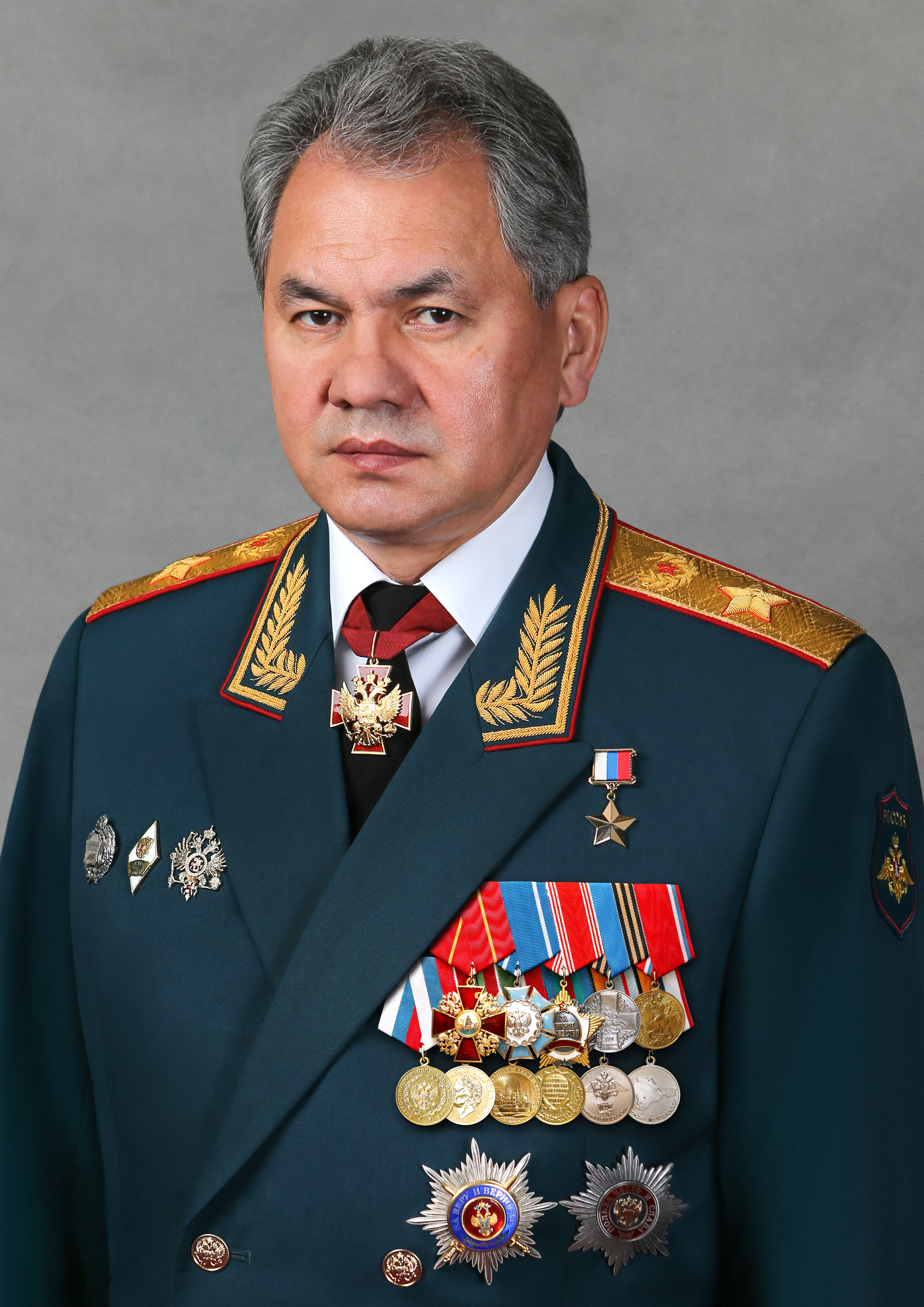
Sergei Shoigu, Minister of Defence of Russia

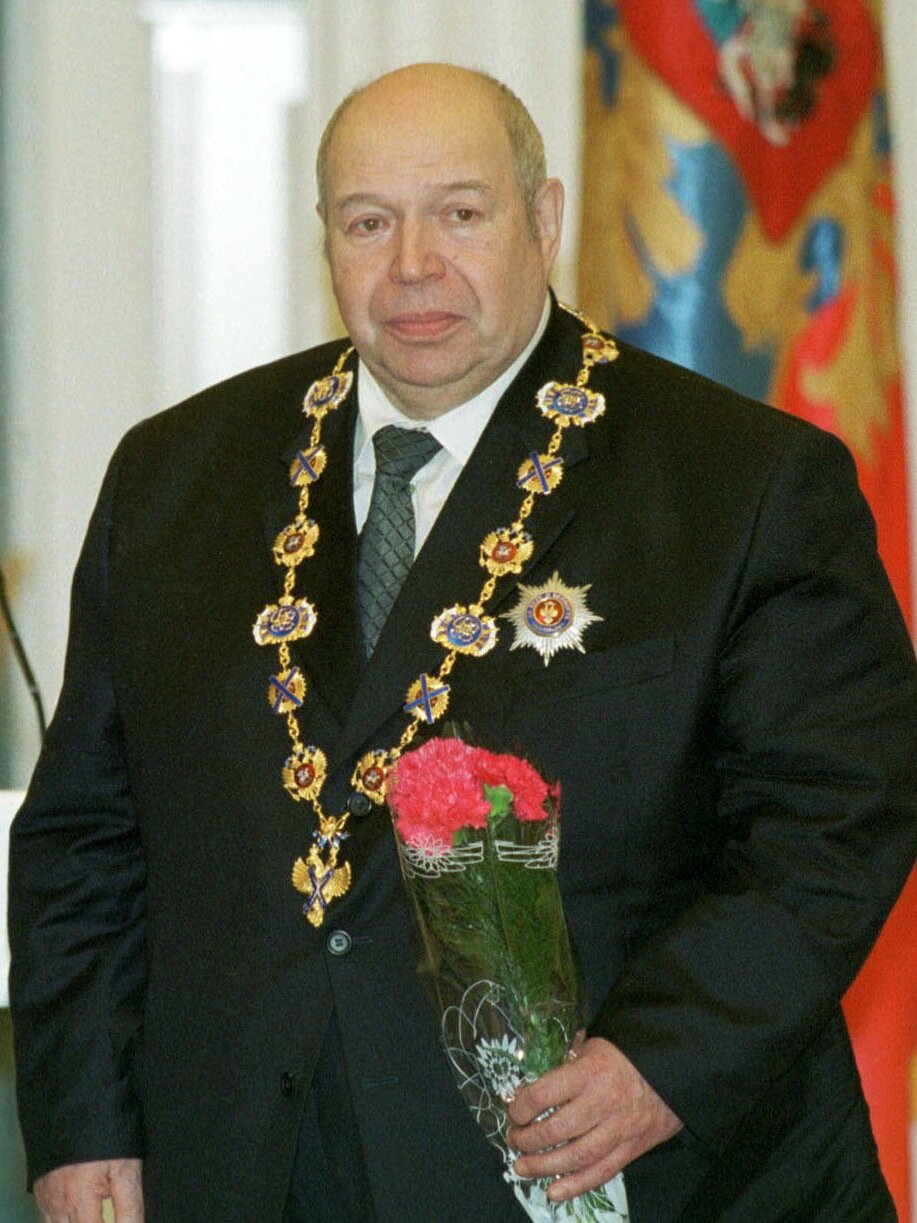
Valery Shumakov, founding father of organ transplants in Russia

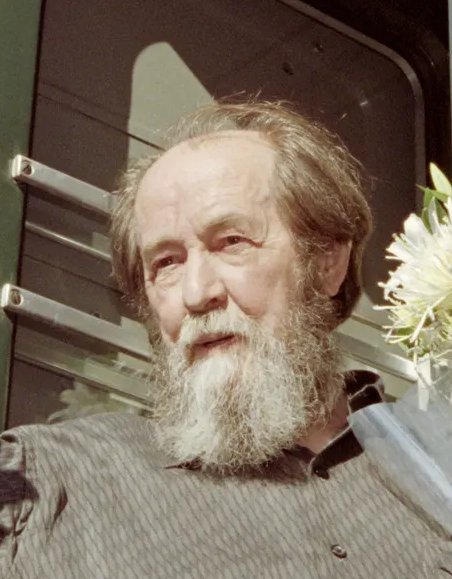
Author Aleksandr Solzhenitsyn

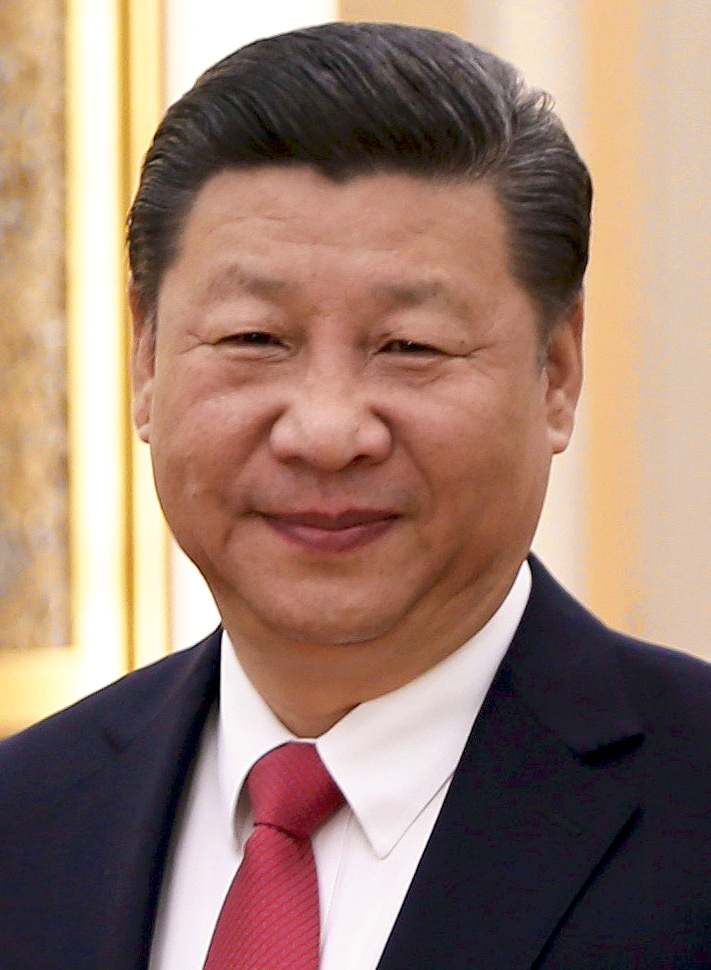
Xi Jinping, President of China

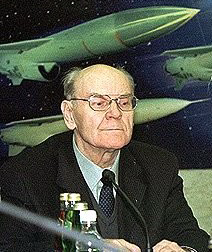
Design engineer Herbert Yefremov

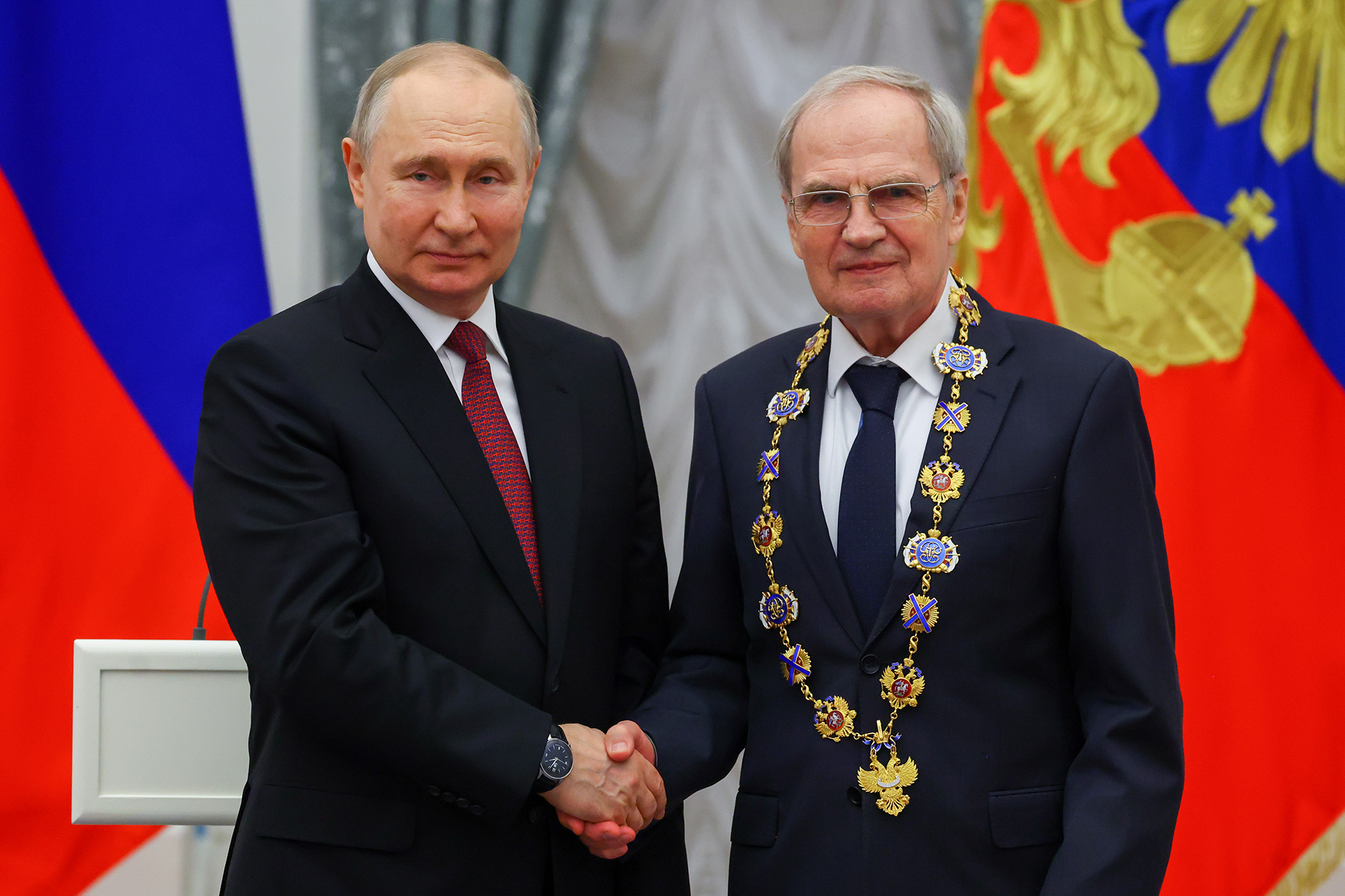
Valery Zorkin, President of the Constitutional Court of Russia

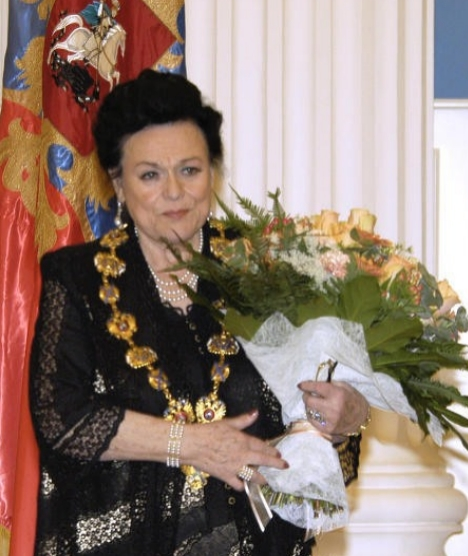
Lyudmila Zykina, national folk singer of Russia

== See also ==
- Awards and decorations of the Russian Federation
