= Valery Shumakov =

Russian surgeon and transplantologist

- Валерий Шумаков
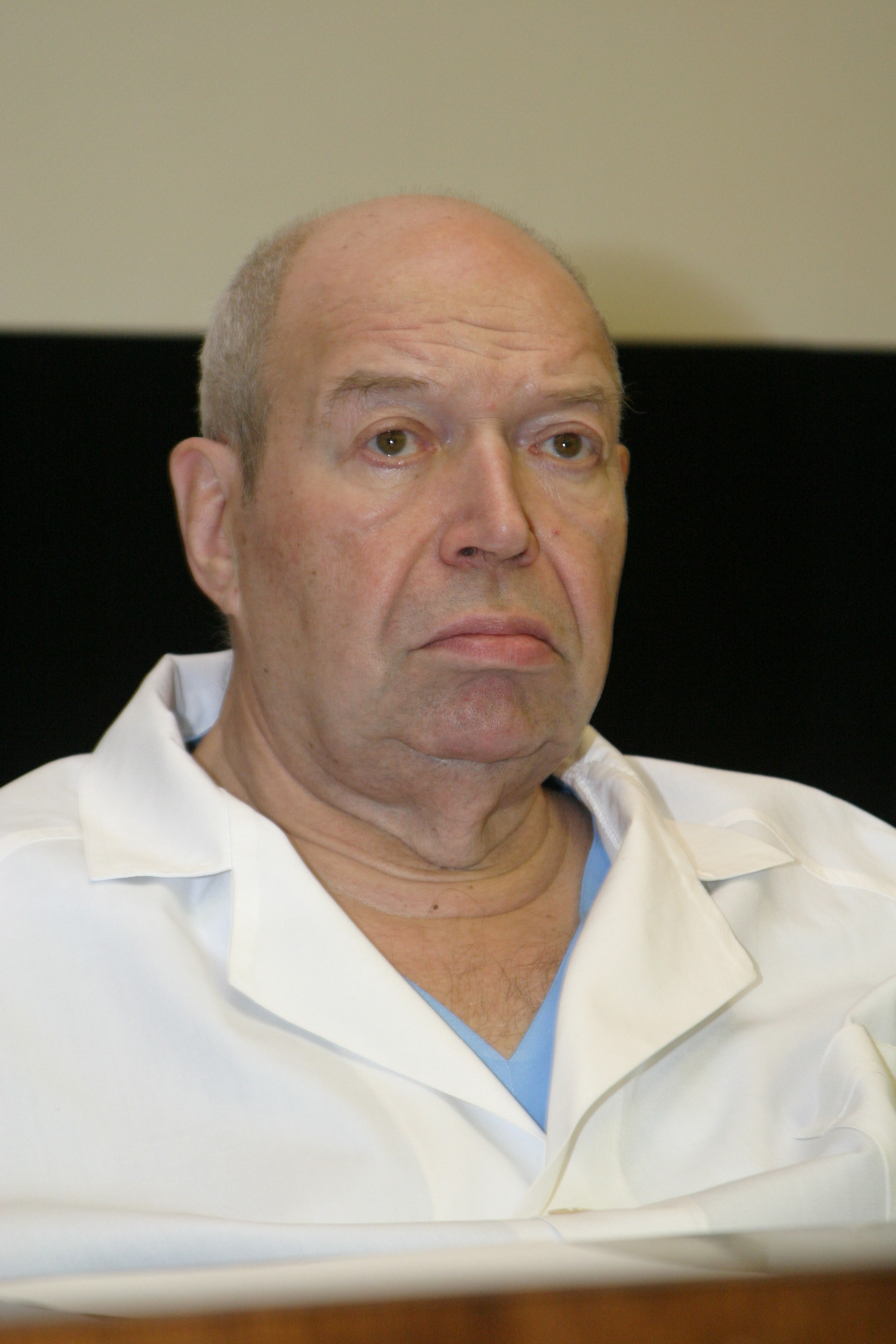
- Shumakov in 2004
- Born: 9 November 1931; Moscow, Russian SFSR, USSR
- Died: 27 January 2008 (aged 76); Moscow, Russia
- Education: First Moscow State Medical University
- Years active: 1956–2008
- Known for: first successful human-to-human heart transplant in Russia
- Awards: Hero of Socialist Labour; Order of St. Andrew; Order "For Merit to the Fatherland"; Order of Lenin; Medal "In Commemoration of the 850th Anniversary of Moscow"; State Prize of the Russian Federation
- Medical career
- Profession: Surgeon
- Institutions: Medical Research Institute of Transplantation and Artificial Organs of Ministry of Health of Russian Federation
- Sub-specialties: Surgery; Heart transplantation

Valery Ivanovich Shumakov (Russian: Валерий Иванович Шумаков; 9 November 1931 – 27 January 2008) was a Russian surgeon and transplantologist, famous for being the founding father of organ transplants in Russia and was a pioneer of artificial organ surgery.

== Career ==
Shumakov began his medical career by researching blood flow during congenital heart disorder operations.

He was the founding father of organ transplants in Russia, creating the Medical Research Institute of Transplantation and Artificial Organs, which he headed for more than 30 years (since 1974). He was the first doctor in Russia to successfully transplant a liver, a heart and a thyroid. Valery Shumakov has written more than 20 books and 450 scientific publications.

Shumakov was recognized by both the Soviet and Russian governments for his achievements in medicine. Member of the Russian Academy of Sciences and the Russian Academy of Medical Sciences, he also won the international gold medal Outstanding World Surgeon.

In 2002, Valery Shumakov received the Russian state's highest distinction, the Order of Saint Andrew. Speaking in the ceremony, Vladimir Putin described Shumakov as "a surprising personality, a scientist whose name known to the world and an uncommonly talented surgeon."

== Honours and awards ==
- Hero of Socialist Labour (26 December 1990) - for outstanding contributions to the development of Soviet transplantation and its application in practice, fruitful scientific and social activities
- Order of Saint Andrew (3 November 2001) - for outstanding achievement in the field of health and medical science
- Order of Merit for the Fatherland;
  - 2nd class (12 April 1999) - for outstanding contribution to the national transplant establishment and implementation of artificial organs in clinical practice, fruitful scientific and social activity'
  - 3rd class (20 March 1995) - for outstanding achievements in health and medical science, advances in transplantation and artificial organs
- Order of Lenin (1990)
- Medal "In Commemoration of the 850th Anniversary of Moscow" (1997)
- Honoured Inventor of the RSFSR (1978)
- USSR State Prize (1971)
- Laureate of the Russian Federation in Science and Technology (1997)
- Honoured Citizen of Moscow (1997)

== See also ==
- Cardiothoracic Surgery
- Artificial heart
