= Gerbert Yefremov =

Russian weapons designer

- Герберт Ефремов
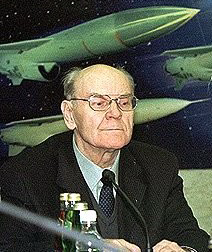
- Yefremov in 2002
- Born: Gerbert Aleksandrovich Yefremov; March 15, 1933 (age 93); Belozersky District, Northern Krai, Soviet Union
- Education: Leningrad Mechanical Institute
- Occupations: Scientist, engineer

Gerbert (sometimes Herbert) Aleksandrovich Yefremov (Russian: Герберт Александрович Ефремов, born March 15, 1933) is a Soviet and Russian scientist, design engineer and Professor of Technical Sciences.

Since 1984 (after the death of Vladimir Chelomey) - General Designer, from 1989 to 2007 - General Director, General Designer NPO Mashinostroyeniya. Directly involved or supervised the creation of

- Cruise missiles and rockets (P-5, S-5, «Kh-80»);
- Anti-ship missiles (P-35, «P-70 Ametist», «P-120 Malakhit», «P-500 Bazalt», «P-700 Granit», P-800 Oniks»);
- Supersonic cruise missile BrahMos for Indian forces;
- Intercontinental ballistic missiles UR-100, UR-100N;
- Military space station program Almaz;
- Orbital carrier rocket Strela;
- Hypersonic glide vehicle Avangard.

The recipient of state awards from the former Soviet Union and other countries (including the Padma Bhushan from India) co-founded the Indo-Russian joint venture BrahMos.

He played a leading role in the design and construction of several sensitive military missile systems and space stations. His identity and role in these projects was treated as a state secret for several years.
