= Moscow Military District =

Military district of the Russian Armed Forces

- Московский военный округ
- Moscow Military District Coat of Arms
- Founded: 6 August 1864
- Country: (Russia) Russian Empire (1864–1917); RSFSR (1918–1922); Soviet Union (1922–1991) (Russia) Russian Federation (1991–2010; 1 March 2024–present)
- Branch: Russian Ground Forces
- Type: Military district
- Part of: Ministry of Defence
- Headquarters: New Kriegskomissariat, Moscow
- Engagements: Russo-Turkish War of 1877–8; World War I October Revolution; Russian Civil War; World War II; 1991 Soviet coup attempt 1993 Russian constitutional crisis Russian Invasion of Ukraine
- Decorations: Order of Lenin

Commanders
- Commander: Colonel General Sergey Kuzovlev
- Chief of Staff: Major General Dmitry Breduchev

The Order of Lenin Moscow Military District (Russian: Ордена Ленина Московский военный округ) is a military district of the Armed Forces of the Russian Federation. Originally it was a district of the Imperial Russian Army until the Russian Empire's collapse in 1917. It was then part of the Soviet Armed Forces. The district was awarded the Order of Lenin in 1968. In 2010, it was merged with the Leningrad Military District to form the new Western Military District. In December 2022, Defense Minister Sergey Shoigu proposed to reestablish it along with the Leningrad Military District, a decision confirmed in June 2023 by Deputy Chief of the General Staff Yevgeny Burdinsky. The district was formally reconstituted on 26 February 2024 by a Presidential Decree №141, after the Western Military District was split.

Colonel General Sergey Kuzovlev took over as the new district's commander on 15 May 2024. The Moscow Military District is one of the smallest military districts in Russia by geographic size. It is one of two military districts of the Russian Armed Forces, with its jurisdiction primarily within the western central region of European Russia. The Moscow Military District contains 20 federal subjects of Russia: Belgorod Oblast, Bryansk Oblast, Ivanovo Oblast, Kaluga Oblast, Kostroma Oblast, Kursk Oblast, Lipetsk Oblast, Moscow, Moscow Oblast, Nizhny Novgorod Oblast, Oryol Oblast, Ryazan Oblast, Smolensk Oblast, Tambov Oblast, Tver Oblast, Tula Oblast, Vladimir Oblast, Vologda Oblast, Voronezh Oblast, Yaroslavl Oblast. It lies in the Central Federal District.

Military units of the internal troops of the Ministry of Internal Affairs, the FSB Border Service of Russia, as well as units of the Ministry of Emergency Situations and other ministries and departments of the Russian Federation performing tasks on the territory of the district are under its operational subordination.

== History ==
=== Russian Empire (1864–1917) ===
In the beginning of the second half of the 19th century Russian officials realized the need for re-organization of the Imperial Russian Army to meet new circumstances. During May 1862, the War Ministry, headed by Army General Dmitry Milyutin, introduced to Tsar Alexander II of Russia proposals for the reorganization of the army, which included the formation of fifteen military districts. A tsarist edict of 6 August 1864, announced in a Defence Minister’s order on 10 August of the same year, established ten military districts, including Moscow. The District’s territory then comprised 12 provinces: Vladimir, Vologda, Kaluga, Kostroma, Moscow, Nizhniy Novgorod, Ryazan, Smolensk, Tambov, Tver, Tula, and Yaroslavl. The District was intended as a reinforcement source for troops and equipment, being some distance from the frontier, rather than an operational area.

The District dispatched five infantry and a cavalry division south to the Russo-Turkish War of 1877–8, as well as sending another division to the Caucasus area. This force totaled around 30,000 men and 20,000 horses. Over 80,000 men were also called into reserve units. The District also housed 21,000 Turkish prisoners of war. During the First World War over a million men were stationed in the district. Much of the garrison was involved in the October Revolution of 1917, and consequent establishment of a Soviet regime in the cities of Bryansk, Vladimir, Voronezh, Kaluga, Nizhniy Novgorod, Orel, Tver, Yaroslavl. By a resolution of the Moscow Military Revolutionary Committee on 17 November [O.S. 4 November] 1917, Corps Commander N.I. Muralov was assigned as the new commander of the district.

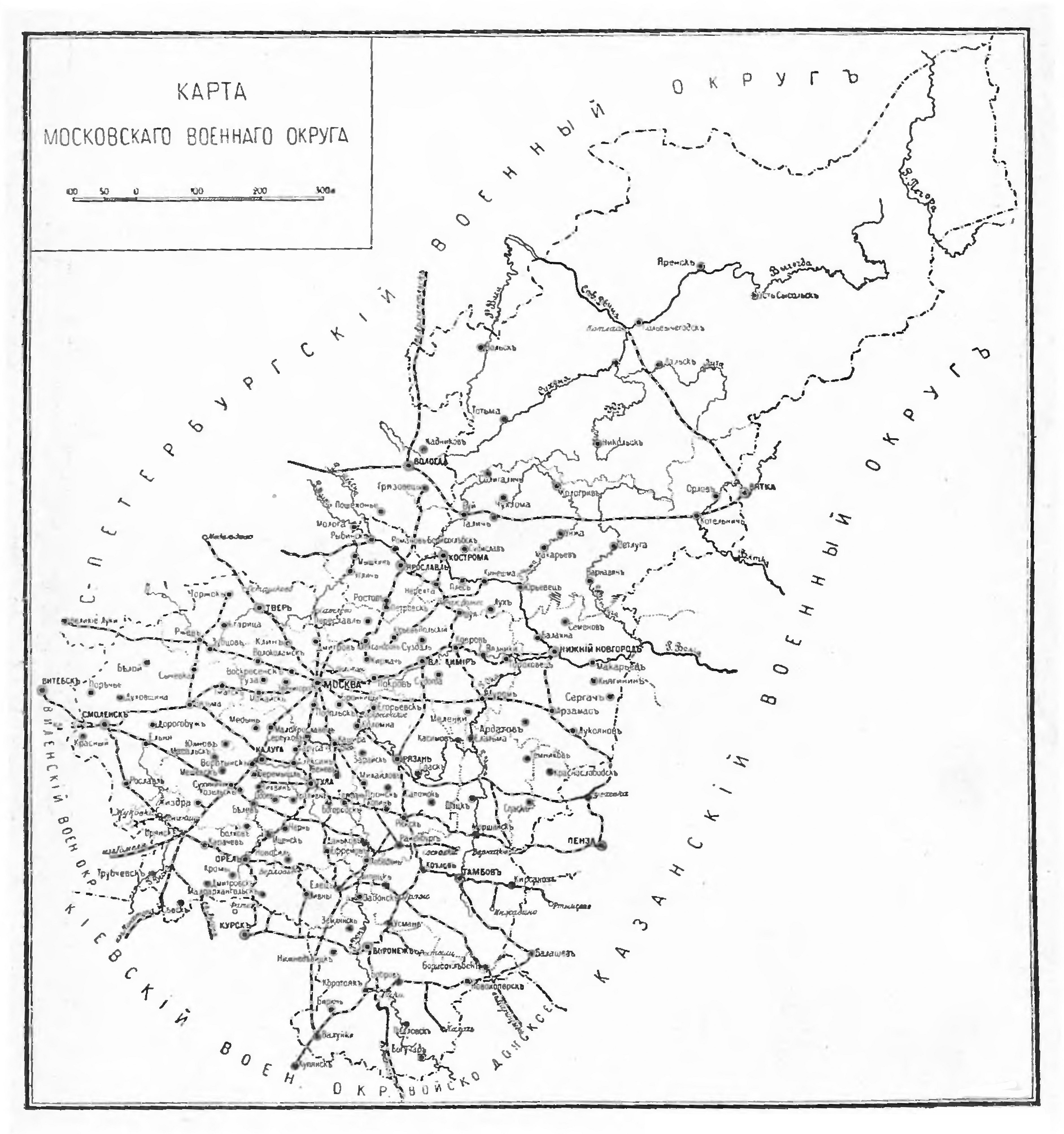
Moscow Military District in 1914.

=== Soviet Russia & Soviet Union (1917–1991) ===
In the period of the Russian Civil War and military intervention in Russia 1917 - 22 the District prepared military personnel for all the fronts and supplied the Red Army with different forms of armament and allowances. From June to the middle of September 1919 the District conducted 33 callups totalling more than 500,000 people. In Moscow the 1 Moscow Rifle Division, Warsaw revolutionary infantry regiment, and 2nd revolutionary infantry regiment were formed, and Latvian forces were brought to the Latvian Rifles Division. In Voronezh two cavalry divisions were formed, two rifle divisions and two rifle regiments in Nizhniy Novgorod, and the 16th Rifle Division in Tambov. Artillery units too were also being raised in the capital area.

After the end of Civil War in the troops of region were demobilized, as a result of which their number was reduced from 580,000 (at the end of 1920) to 85,000 in January 1923, and the District was reorganised on a peacetime basis. In the 1920s the District had 10 rifle divisions: the 1st Moscow Proletariat Red Banner Rifle Division (first formed either in December 1924 or at the beginning of 1927), the 6th Oryol; the 14th Vladimir; the 17th Nikhegorodskaya; the 18th Yaroslavskaya; the 19th Voronekhskaya; the 48th Tverskaya; the 55th Kurskaya; the 81st Kaluga; and the 84th Tula. Autumn maneuvers began to be conducted yearly here in the district. The 2nd Rifle Corps was stationed in the district from 1922 to 1936. In the beginning of the 1930 tanks started to be introduced, including the MS or T-18, T-26, T-27, BT, T-28, and the heavy T-35. In 1930 the first mechanized infantry brigade in the Soviet Army was formed in the district.

Moscow Military District Map as of 2009

The Russian Ground Forces' official site notes that the first tactical parachute landing took place in the District on 2 August 1930.

In World War II the District formed three fronts, 23 armies, 128 divisions of all arms, and 197 brigades of all arms, an approximate total of 4.5 million men. In 1944–5 alone the District sent to the front 1,200,000 soldiers. From summer 1945 to summer 1946, in order to supervise the demobilisation process, the District was subdivided into four: the Moscow, Voronezh (1949–60), Gorki (1945—1947, 1949—1953) (where the 324th Rifle Division was probably demobilised), and Smolensk Military Districts (33rd Army, home from Germany, formed Smolensk MD headquarters in late 1945). General Kirill Moskalenko took command of the District in 1953 and would later be a Marshal of the Soviet Union after leaving his post.

The Voronezh Military District was reactivated in 1949 and was active until 1960.

In January 1954 the district's forces comprised the 1st Guards Rifle Corps (including the 62nd Guards Mechanised Division and the 60th Rifle Division); the 11th Guards Rifle Corps (272nd Rifle Division and 23rd Guards Mechanized Division), the 13th Guards Rifle Corps (38th Guards Rifle Division and the 66th Guards Mechanised Division), 38th Guards Airborne Corps (13th Guards, 105th Guards Vienna Airborne Division and 106th Airborne Division) and the 4th Guards Kantemirovskaya Tank Division. Among the 1957 reorganisations was the creation of the 23rd Guards Motor Rifle Division from the 23rd Guards Mechanized Division.

On 22 February 1968, for the large contribution to the cause of strengthening the defense of the state, for its successes in combat and political training, and in view of the 50th anniversary of the Soviet Army plus its important role in the 2nd World War, the District was awarded with the Order of Lenin.

In 1979 Scott and Scott reported the HQ address as being Moscow, A-252, Chapayevskiy Per., Dom 14.

=== Post-Soviet era (1991–2010) ===
Medium emble

With the collapse of the USSR the District became for the first time in its history a boundary district and thus a new priority was put on building up combat forces within it, rather than the training and capital garrison focus of the Soviet period.

In the early 1990s the District received the headquarters of the First Guards Tank Army from the Group of Soviet Forces in Germany. It was relocated to Smolensk, and consisted of the 4th Guards Tank Division and 144th Guards Motor Rifle Division (at Yelnya). In July 1992 the 336th Independent Helicopter Regiment returned from Germany to Oreshkovo airfield and was placed under the Moscow Military District. The regiment then came under 1st Guards Tank Army from 31 December 1992. The 1st Guards Tank Army's headquarters disbanded later in the 1990s, along with the 144th Guards MRD. In addition, the 6th Guards Motor Rifle Brigade was withdrawn from Germany and restationed at Kursk.

The 22nd Army Headquarters was reformed from 13th Army Corps in the early 1990s, to control the new 3rd Motor Rifle Division among other formations. The 22nd Army had previously been inactive for a long period; it was last operational immediately after the war (when it participated in the Second Rzhev-Sychevka Offensive in late 1942) when its HQ along with the 109th Rifle Division arrived in the South Ukraine in May 1945. In the Northern summer of 1945, together with the headquarters of the Separate Coastal Army, located in the Crimea, it was reorganised as the new but short-lived Tavria Military District.

On 1 June 1997 the 59th Guards Motor Rifle Division in Transdnestr, Moldova, was reorganised as the 8th Guards Independent Motor-Rifle Brigade with four motor-rifle battalions, one tank battalion, two artillery battalions, and an anti-tank battalion plus other combat support and support units. After several years reporting directly to the General Staff, the Operational Group of Russian Forces in Moldova was realigned under the command of the Moscow Military District in 1998. Previously the 14th Guards Army (it was renamed in April 1995), forces and individuals from this command played a major part in the early 1990s in establishing and maintaining the Transnistrian separatists of the Transnistria as a viable de facto state.

In 1994 the 16th Air Army took over most air forces from the Air Forces of the Moscow Military District. In 2010, the district was merged with the Leningrad Military District to form the new Western Military District.

=== Recreation (2024–present) ===
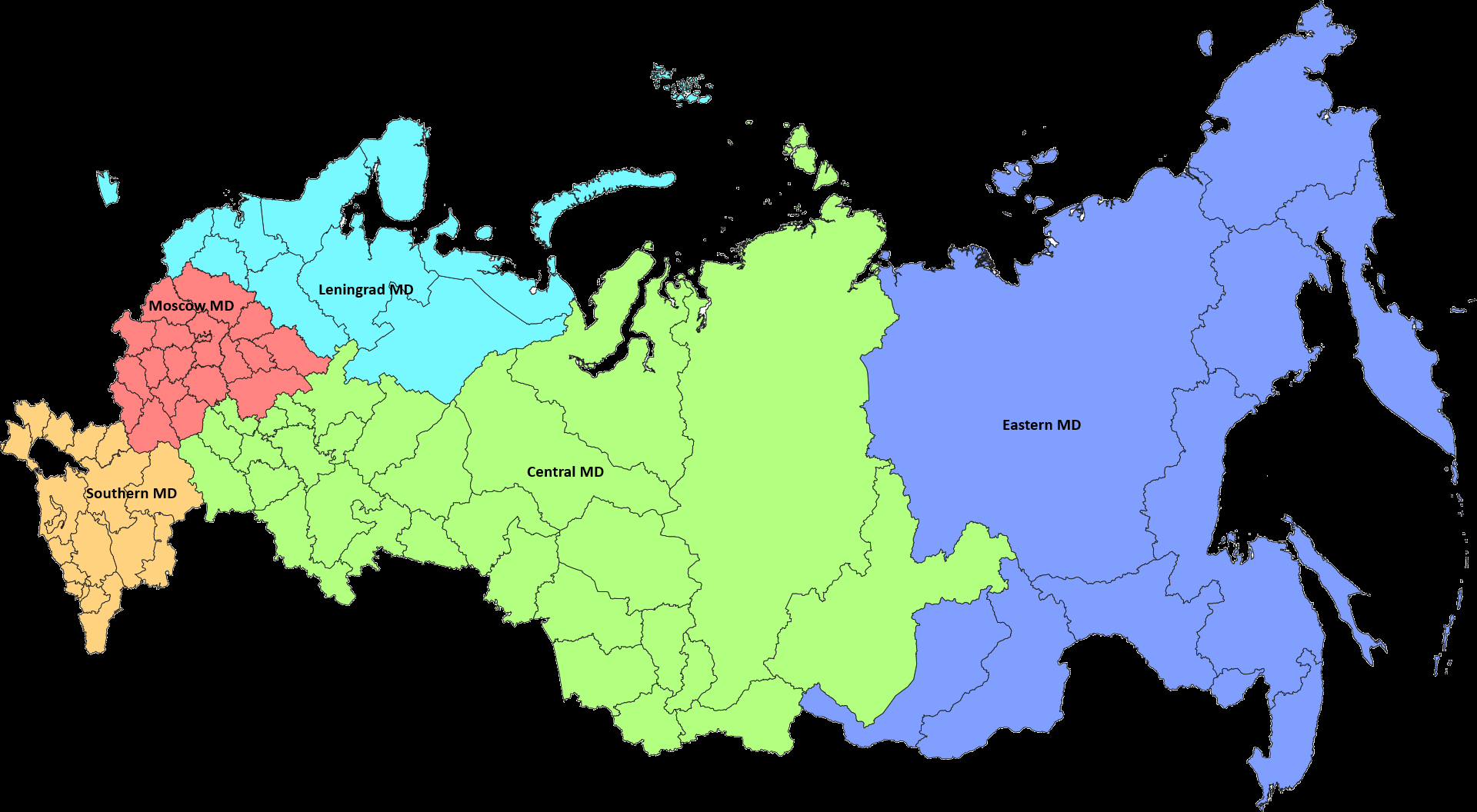
Military districts of the Russian Federation as of 2024, Moscow MD in red color.

On 21 December 2022, citing the influx of conscripts from the 2022 Russian mobilization, Russian Minister of Defence Sergei Shoigu announced that the Moscow Military District was being re-established, alongside the Leningrad Military District. On 20 March 2024, Russian Defense Minister Sergei Shoigu announced formation of the new 69th Motor Rifle Division and renewed 34th Guards Artillery Division as part of the Moscow Military District.

== Cold war ==
=== Order of battle c. 1989 ===
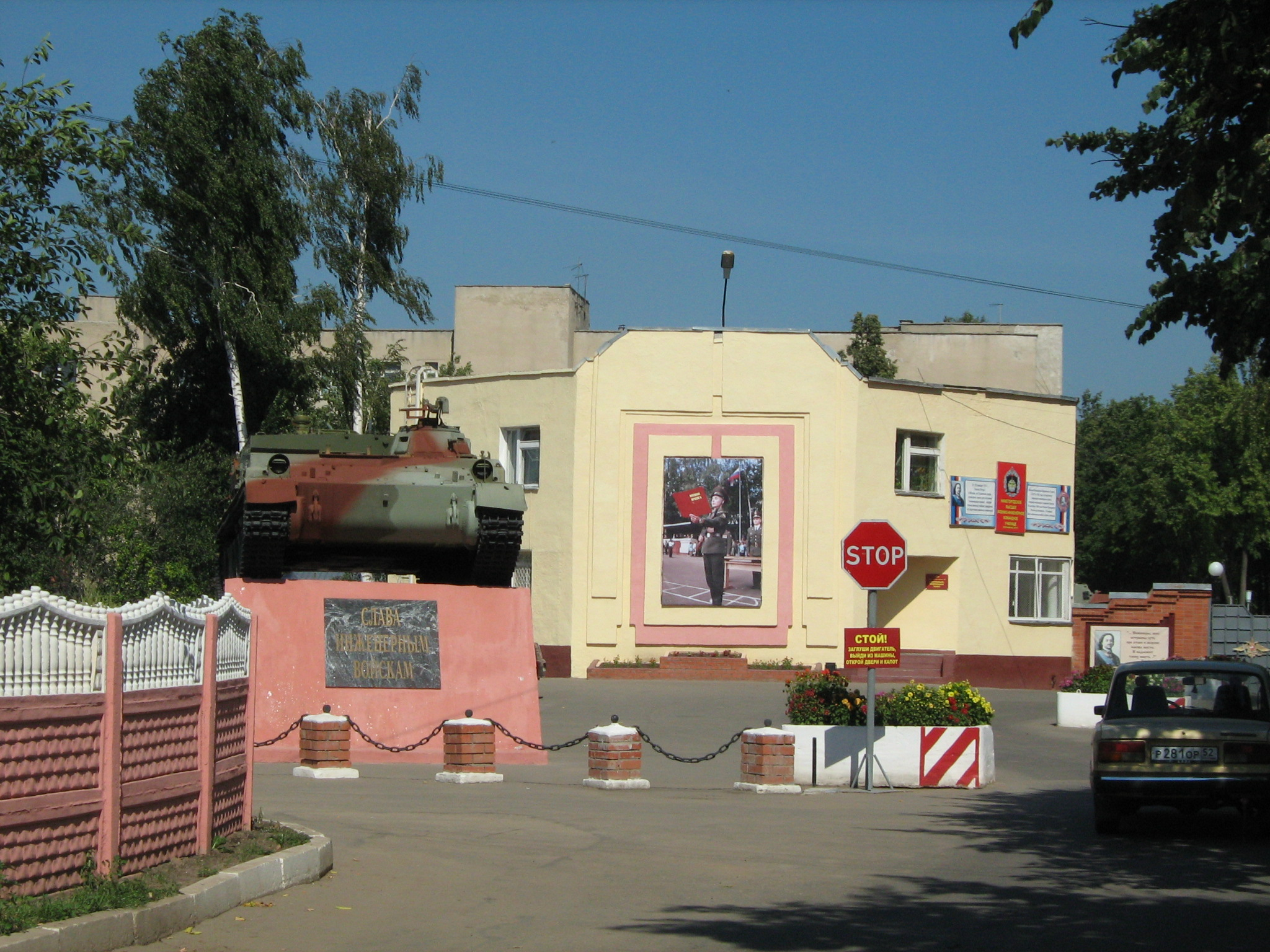
Entrance to a military engineering school in Kstovo, Nizhny Novgorod Oblast

=== Units directly subordinated to the District HQ ===
District Command and Headquarters (Управление командующего и штаб) - Moscow, RSFSR

- 367th Separate Staff Security and Supply Battalion (367-й отдельный батальон охраны и обеспечения штаба) - Moscow
- 1st Separate Rifle Brigade for Security of the Ministry of Defence premises (1-я отдельная стрелковая бригада охраны МО) - Moscow (Feskov et al 2013, p505). Activated 1 October 1967 in Moscow, Moscow Oblast, from the 4th independent Regiment for Protection.
- 154th Separate Commandant's Regiment (154-й отдельный комендантский полк) - Moscow (Lefortovo District)
- 11th Separate Cavalry Regiment (11-й отдельный кавалерийский полк) - Alabino, Moscow Oblast, RSFSR (the regiment was a horse-riding display unit actually formed in 1962 at the suggestion of film director Sergei Bondarchuk for the filming of historical dramas)
- 16th Separate SpezNaz Brigade (16-я отдельная бригада специального назначения) - Chuchkovo, Ryazan Oblast, RSFSR
- 53rd Separate Radio-technical Brigade OsNaz (53-я отдельная радиотехническая бригада ОсНаз) - Kaluga, Kaluga Oblast, RSFSR (GRU formation operationally attached to the district)
- 312th Separate Radio-technical Regiment OsNaz (312-й отдельный радиотехнический полк ОсНаз) - Smolensk, Smolensk Oblast, RSFSR (GRU formation operationally attached to the district)
- 225th Separate Radio-electronic Warfare Regiment (225-й отдельный полк РЭБ) - Novomoskovsk, Tula Oblast, RSFSR (EW Directorate of the General Staff's (Управление РЭБ ГШ СССР) unit operationally attached to the district)
- 227th Separate Radio-electronic Warfare Regiment (227-й отдельный полк РЭБ) - Kursk, Kursk Oblast, RSFSR (EW Directorate of the General Staff's (Управление РЭБ ГШ СССР) unit operationally attached to the district)
- 1384th Separate Radio-electronic Warfare Battalion (1384-й отдельный батальон РЭБ) Kursk (EW Directorate of the General Staff's (Управление РЭБ ГШ СССР) unit operationally attached to the district)
- 106th Guards, awarded the Order of the Red Banner and the Order of Kutuzov Airborne Landing Division (106-я гвардейская воздушно-десантная Краснознамённая, ордена Кутузова дивизия) - Tula, Tula Oblast, RSFSR (VDV division operationally attached to the district)
- 9th Separate Nuclear Blast Detection and Reconnaissance Regiment (9-й отдельный ордена Красной Звезды полк засечки и разведки ядерных взрывов) - Bobrov, Voronezh Oblast, RSFSR
- ? Signals Nod (?-й узел связи) - Moscow
- 1st Separate Sevastopolskaya, awarded the Order of the Red Banner, the Order of Alexander Nevsky and the Order of the Red Star Signals Brigade of the Supreme Command (1-я отдельная Севастопольская Краснознамённая, орденов Александра Невского и Красной Звезды бригада связи ВГК) - Khimki, Moscow Oblast, RSFSR
- 14th Separate Signals Brigade of the Supreme Command (14-я отдельная бригада связи ВГК) - Podolsk, Moscow Oblast, RSFSR
- 111th Separate Signals Brigade (111-я отдельная бригада связи) - Golitsino (possibly in Odintsovsky District), Moscow Oblast, RSFSR
- 112th Separate Signals Brigade for the Rear Services (112-я отдельная бригада связи тыла) - Yegoryevsk, Moscow Oblast, RSFSR
- 90th Separate Signals Regiment (90-й отдельный полк связи) - Kalinin, Kalinin Oblast, RSFSR
- 27th Separate Guards Sevastopolskaya, awarded the Order of the Red Banner Motor Rifle Brigade (27-я отдельная гвардейская мотострелковая Севастопольская Краснознамённая бригада) (г. Видное) - Vidnoye, Moscow Oblast, RSFSR (rear area security formation)
- 95th Ballistic Missile Brigade (95-я ракетная бригада) - Shuya, Ivanovo Oblast, RSFSR
- 126th Ballistic Missile Brigade (126-я ракетная бригада) - Kobyakovo, Vologda Oblast, RSFSR
- 228th High Power [2S7 Pion] Artillery Brigade (228-я артиллерийская бригада большой мощности) - Shuya
- 235th Guards Gun Artillery Brigade (235-я гвардейская пушечная артиллерийская бригада - Skopin, Ryazan Oblast, RSFSR
- 45th Artillery Brigade (45-я артиллерийская бригада) - Tambov, Tambov Oblast, RSFSR
- 167th Gun Artillery Brigade (167-я пушечная артиллерийская бригада) - Kalinin
- 236th Gun Artillery Brigade (236-я пушечная артиллерийская бригада) - Tambov
- 349th Anti-Tank Artillery Brigade (349-я противотанковая артиллерийская бригада) - Skopin
- 806th Multiple Rocket Launcher Artillery Regiment (806-й реактивный артиллерийский полк) - Skopin
- 987th Artillery Reconnaissance Regiment (987-й разведывательный артиллерийский полк) - Skopin
- 1st Separate Guards Combat Engineer Regiment (1-й отдельный гвардейский инженерно-сапёрный Кёнигсбергско-Городокский Краснознамённый полк) (Ростов)
- 7th Guards Combat Engineer Regiment (7-й гвардейский инженерно-сапёрный полк) (Белев)
- 79th Separate Engineer Camouflage Construction Regiment (79-й отдельный инженерно-маскировочный батальон) (Ногинск) - Noginsk, Moscow Oblast, RSFSR
- 2nd Chemical Defence Brigade of the Chemical Troops of the USSR (2-я бригада химической защиты) - Teykovo, Ivanovo Oblast, RSFSR
- 3rd Chemical Defence Brigade of the Chemical Troops (3-я бригада химической защиты) - Kineshma, Ivanovo Oblast, RSFSR
- 26th Chemical Defence Brigade of the Chemical Troops (26-я бригада химической защиты) - Ryazan
- 27th Chemical Defence Brigade of the Chemical Troops (27-я бригада химической защиты) - Kursk
- 347th Separate Aerodrome Engineer Battalion of the Ground Forces (347-й отдельный инженерно-аэродромный батальон сухопутных войск) - Tula
- 17th Engineering Road and Bridge Construction Brigade (17-я инженерная дорожно-мостовая бригада) - Kashira, Moscow Oblast, RSFSR
- 190th Pontoon Bridging Brigade (190-я понтонно-мостовая бригада) (Новозыбков) - Novozybkov, Bryansk Oblast, RSFSR
- 86th Separate Pontoon Bridging Battalion (86-й отдельный понтонно-мостовой батальон) - Murom, Vladimir Oblast, RSFSR (or possibly Balakhna, Nizhny Novgorod Oblast, RSFSR)
- 15th Road Traffic Control Brigade (15-я дорожно-комендантская бригада) - Reutov, Moscow Oblast, RSFSR
- 19th Road Traffic Control Brigade (19-я дорожно-комендантская бригада) - Voronezh, Voronezh Oblast, RSFSR
- 467th Guards Moskovsko-Tartuskiy Red Banner District Center for Junior Specialists (467-й гвардейский окружной учебный Московско-Тартуский Краснознамённый центр подготовки младших специалистов) - Vladimir, Vladimir Oblast, RSFSR (From October 3, 1987 on. Until then the 26th Guards Moskovsko-Tartuskaya Red Banner Tank Training Division (26-я гвардейская учебная танковая Московско-Тартуская Краснознамённая дивизия))
  - 475th Separate Guards Signals Training Battalion (475-й отдельный учебный гвардейский батальон связи)
  - 419th Guards Training Motor Rifle Regiment (419-й учебный гвардейский мотострелковый полк)
  - 123rd Guards Artillery Training Regiment (123-й учебный гвардейский артполк)
  - 422nd Air Defence Artillery Training Regiment (422-й учебный зенитный артполк)
  - 84th Separate Ballistic Missile Training Battalion (84-й отдельный учебный ракетный дивизион)
  - Separate Reconnaissance Training Battalion (отдельный учебный разведывательный батальон)
  - 105th Separate Medical Training Battalion (105-й отдельный учебный медицинский батальон)
  - 852nd Separate Automobile Training Battalion (852-й отдельный учебный автомобильный батальон)
- 468th District Training Center (468-й окружной учебный центр) - Mulino, Gorkiy Oblast, RSFSR (previously the 20th Artillery Training Division, the sole artillery training division of the Soviet Ground Forces)
  - 1685th Separate Signals Training Battalion (1685-й отдельный учебный батальон связи)
  - 922nd Artillery Training Regiment (922-й учебный артиллерийский полк)
  - 280th Anti-Tank Artillery Training Regiment (280-й учебный противотанковый артиллерийский полк)
  - 932nd Artillery Reconnaissance Training Regiment (932-й учебный разведывательный артиллерийский полк)
- 63rd Material Support Brigade (63-я бригада материального обеспечения) (Серпухов) - Serpukhov, Moscow Oblast, RSFSR
- 6450th Repair and Overhaul Base (6450-я ремонтно-восстановительная база) - Kubinka
- 6451st Repair and Overhaul Base (6451-я ремонтно-восстановительная база) - Naro-Fominsk, Moscow Oblast, RSFSR
- divisions directly subordinated to the district:
  - 2nd Guards Tamanskaya, awarded the Order of the Red Banner and the Order of Suvorov Motor Rifle Division, named after M. I. Kalinin (2-я гвардейская мотострелковая Таманская Краснознамённая, ордена Суворова дивизия имени М. И. Калинина) - Kalininets (near Naro-Fominsk), Moscow Oblast, RSFSR (not to be confused with the 32nd Guards Tamanskaya MRD)
  - 4th Guards Kantemirovskaya, awarded the Order of the Red Banner and the Order of Lenin Tank Division, named after Y. B. Andropov (4-я гвардейская танковая Кантемировская ордена Ленина, Краснознамённая дивизия имени Ю. В. Андропова - Naro-Fominsk
  - 32nd Guards Tamanskaya, awarded the Order of the Red Banner and the Order of Suvorov Motor Rifle Division (32-я гвардейская мотострелковая Таманская Краснознамённая, ордена Суворова дивизия) (converted into the 5210th Guards Armament and Equipment Storage Base (5210-я гвардейская БХВТ) in October 1989, disbanded 1993) - Kalinin (not to be confused with the 2nd Guards Tamanskaya MRD)
  - 149th Motor Rifle Division [cadred] (149-я мотострелковая дивизия кадра) - Klintsy, Bryansk Oblast, RSFSR
  - 196th Motor Rifle Division [cadred] (196-я мотострелковая дивизия кадра) - Kursk, Kursk Oblast, RSFSR
  - 206th Motor Rifle Division [cadred] (206-я мотострелковая дивизия кадра) - Kalinin
  - 16th Artillery Division [cadred] (16-я артиллерийская дивизия кадра) (converted into the 1874th Armament and Equipment Storage Base (Artillery Hardware Storage) (1874-я БХВТ (БХИ-А)) in the autumn of 1989) - Kalinin
  - 17th Artillery Division [cadred] (17-я артиллерийская дивизия кадра) (converted into the 1875th Armament and Equipment Storage Base (Artillery Hardware Storage) (1875-я БХВТ (БХИ-А)) in the autumn of 1989) - Tambov, Tambov Oblast, RSFSR
  - 228th Rear Area Defence Division [cadred] (228-я дивизия охраны тыла кадра) - Moscow
  - 65th Deep Reserve Tank Division [cadred] (65-я запасная танковая дивизия кадра) - Ryazan
  - 255th Deep Reserve Motor Rifle Division [cadred] (255-я запасная мотострелковая дивизия кадра) - Kursk

=== Land Forces ===
In addition to the ground forces divisions directly subordinated to the district HQ, the Moscow MD had the 13th Guards Army Corps as its main ground forces formation:

- 13th Guards Kyonigsbergskiy Order of the Red Banner Army Corps (13-й гвардейский армейский Кенигсбергский Краснознамённый корпус). In 1990 this corps was under the command of General Fyodor Reut.
  - Corps Command and HQ (Управление корпуса) - Gorkiy, Gorkiy Oblast, RSFSR
  - 785th Separate Staff Security and Supply Company (785-я отдельная рота охраны и обеспечения) - Gorkiy, Gorkiy Oblast, RSFSR
  - 779th Signals Nod (779-й узел связи) - Gorkiy, Gorky Oblast, RSFSR
  - 72nd Separate Guards Signals Battalion (72-й отдельный гвардейский батальон связи) - Pyra, Gorkiy Oblast, RSFSR
  - 635th Separate Radio Relay and Cable Communications Battalion (635-й отдельный радиорелейно-кабельный батальон) - Mulino, Gorkiy Oblast, RSFSR
  - 298th Separate Radio Intercept and ELINT Battalion (298-й отдельный батальон засечки и разведки) - Gorkiy, Gorkiy Oblast, RSFSR
  - 88th Air Defence Radar Battalion (88-й отдельный радиотехнический батальон ПВО) - Pyra, Gorkiy Oblast, RSFSR
  - 50th Ballistic Missile Brigade (50-я ракетная бригада) - Shuya, Ivanovo Oblast, RSFSR
  - 876th Separate Guards Combat Engineer Battalion (876-й отдельный гвардейский инженерно-сапёрный батальон) - Balakhna, Gorkiy Oblast, RSFSR
  - 385th Separate Road and Bridge Construction Engineer Battalion (385-й отдельный инженерный дорожно-мостовой батальон) - Balakhna, Gorkiy Oblast, RSFSR
  - 60th Sevsko-Varshavskaya, Orders of the Red Banner and Suvorov Tank Division (60-я танковая Севско-Варшавская Краснознамённая ордена Суворова дивизия), Gorkiy, Gorkiy Oblast, RSFSR (former 60th Rifle Div. then briefly 65th Mech Div. and 43rd Tank Div. before becoming 60th Tank Div. in 1965; transformed on March 9, 1989 into the 5409th Armament and Equipment Storage Base (5409-я БХВТ), the 5409th AESB itself disbanded on February 13, 1990, as formations from the Western Group of Forces, such as the 47th Guards Tank Division and the 31st Tank Division transferred to the 13th Guards Army Corps, which in turn expanded into the 22nd Guards Combined Arms Army) (Division HQ in Gorkiy, the whole division based in Dzerzhinsk, Gorkiy Oblast, RSFSR)
    - Division HQ
    - 509th Separate Signals Battalion (509-й отдельный батальон связи)
    - 14th Guards Zhytomyrsko-Shepetovskiy, awarded the Order of the Red Banner, the Order of Suvorov and the Order of Kutuzov Tank Regiment (14-й гвардейский танковый Житомирско-Шепетовский Краснознамённый, орденов Суворова и Кутузова полк)
    - 142nd Tank Regiment (142-й танковый полк)
    - 272nd Tank Regiment (272-й танковый полк)
    - 422nd Awarded the Order of the Red Banner, the Order of Suvorov, the Order of Kutuzov and the Order of Alexander Nevsky Motor Rifle Regiment (422-й мотострелковый орденов Суворова, Кутузова и Александра Невского полк)
    - 863rd Prazhskiy, awarded the Order of Alexander Nevsky Artillery Regiment (863-й артиллерийский Пражский ордена Александра Невского полк)
    - ? Air Defence Artillery Regiment (зенитный артиллерийский полк)
    - ? Separate Ballistic Missile Battalion (отдельный ракетный дивизион)
    - ? Separate Reconnaissance Battalion (отдельный разведывательный батальон)
    - 696th Separate Combat Engineer Battalion (696-й отдельный инженерно-сапёрный батальон)
    - Separate Chemical Defence Company (отдельная рота химической защиты)
    - ? Separate Repair and Overhaul Battalion (отдельный ремонтно-восстановительный батальон)
    - 491st Separate Medical Battalion (491-й отдельный медицинский батальон)
    - ? Separate Material Supply Battalion (отдельный батальон материального обеспечения)
  - 5347th Armament and Equipment Storage Base (5347-я БХВТ) - Tambov, Tambov Oblast, RSFSR (formerly the 89th Motor Rifle Division [cadred] (89-я мотострелковая дивизия кадра), transformed in the autumn of 1987 into the 1042nd Territorial Training Center (1042-й ТУЦ) and later in the autumn of 1989 into the 5347th AESB)
  - 225th Motor Rifle Division [cadred] (225-я мотострелковая дивизия кадра) - Mulino, Gorkiy Oblast, RSFSR

=== Air Forces of the Moscow Military District ===
In the last days of the Soviet Union there was a considerable Soviet Air Defence Forces presence, and a smaller Air Forces presence, in the Moscow Military District. The Air Forces of the Moscow Military District consisted of a reconnaissance regiment, the 47th Guards Separate Reconnaissance Aviation Regiment at Shatalovo flying Su-24MPs, and the 9th Fighter Aviation Division (9 iad), at Kubinka, with three regiments. The division incorporated the 32nd Guards Fighter Aviation Regiment, also at Shatalovo, with MiG-23MLDs, the 234th Guards Fighter Aviation Regiment at Kubinka with MiG-29s, and the 274th Fighter-Bomber Aviation Regiment at Migalovo (274 apib) with Su-17s. Also part of the force was a ground signals regiment, the 131st. There was also a transport squadron, an independent helicopter regiment, and an independent helicopter squadron for electronic warfare.

32nd Guards Fighter Aviation Regiment served in Cuba as part of 'Operation Anadyr' during the Cuban Missile Crisis of 1963. The regiment was temporarily renamed 213th Fighter Aviation Regiment while in Cuba. It was disbanded in 1989.

In October 1990 the 1080th Red Banner Training Aviation Center for retraining of personnel im. V.P. Chkalov was activated in Borisoglebsk, Voronezh Oblast, from the 796th Center for Preparation of Officers for Fighter and Fighter-Bomber Aviation, and the Borisoglebsk Higher Military Aviation School of Pilots. It came under the command of the Air Forces of the Moscow Military District. It comprised four instructor aviation regiments, the fourth being the 343rd Fighter Aviation Regiment at Sennoy with MiG-29s.

Joseph Stalin's son Vasily Stalin commanded the Moscow district air forces from June 1948 to August 1952. He was succeeded by General Colonel Stepan Krasovsky (1952–53), Lieutenant General Stepan Rybanov (June 1953 – 1959), and, later, Lieutenant General Igor Dmitriev (ru:Дмитриев, Игорь Михайлович) (1983–1989) and Nikolai Antoshkin (ru:Антошкин, Николай Тимофеевич) (1989–93).

Also part of the Moscow District air forces was the 4th Centre for Combat Employment and Retraining of Personnel at Lipetsk.

Air Forces of the Moscow Military District (ВВС Московского военного округа)(formerly the 78th Air Army)

Command and Headquarters (Командование и штаб ВВС МВО) - Moscow, RSFSR

- 131st Separate Signals and Automatized Command and Control Systems Regiment (131-отдельный полк связи и АСУ) - Donino village (near Ramenskoye), Moscow Oblast, RSFSR
- (378-я отдельная смешанная авиационная эскадрилья (378-я осаэ)) - Kubinka, Moscow Oblast, RSFSR - Tu-134, An-12 An-26, Mi-8, An-2
- 297th Separate Helicopter Squadron for Radio-Electronic Warfare (297-я отдельная вертолётная эскадрилья радиоэлектронной борьбы (297-я овэ рэб)) - Alabino, Moscow Oblast, RSFSR - Mi-8/9
- 9th Red Banner Fighter Aviation Division (9-я Краснознамённая истребительная авиационная дивизия) - Kubinka, Moscow Oblast, RSFSR (designated Fighter Aviation Division for historic reasons, not due to its composition)
  - 234th Guards Proskurovskiy, awarded the Order of the Red Banner, the Order of Kutuzov and the Order of Alexander Nevsky Fighter Aviation Regiment (234-й гвардейский истребительный авиационный Проскуровский Краснознамённый орденов Кутузова и Александра Невского полк (234-й гвиап)) - Kubinka - Su-27, MiG-29, MiG-23, Su-24M, Su-17M, Su-25, L-39 (although designated a combat aviation regiment, its main task was air display of Soviet-produced combat aircraft for foreign dignitaries and official delegations and for that reason in 1989 its designation was changed to the more fitting 237th Guards Center for Display of Aircraft Types (237-й гвардейский центр показа авиационной техники (237 ЦПАТ))
  - 274th Aviation Regiment of Fighter-Bombers (274-й авиационный полк истребителей-бомбардировщиков (274-й апиб)) - Tver (Migalovo), Tver Oblast, RSFSR - Su-17M4
  - (940th Aviation Regiment of Fighter-Bombers (940-й авиационный полк истребителей-бомбардировщиков (940-й апиб)) - Rzhev, Tver Oblast, RSFSR - MiG-27))(disbanded in 1988)
  - (32nd Guards Vilenskiy, awarded the Order of Lenin and the Order of Kutuzov Fighter Aviation Regiment (32-й гвардейский истребительный авиационный Виленский орденов Ленина и Кутузова полк (32 гвиап)) - Shatalovo, Smolensk Oblast, RSFSR - MiG-23MLD)(disbanded in 1989)
- 47th Separate Guards Borisovskiy, awarded the Order of the Red Banner and the Order of Suvorov Reconnaissance Aviation Regiment (47-й отдельный гвардейский разведывательный авиационный Борисовский Краснознаменный ордена Суворова полк (47-й огврап)) - Shatalovo, SMolensk Oblast, RSFSR - Su-24MR (also Su-17M3R from November 1989 on, upgraded to the Su-17M4R variant in 1991)
- 269th Separate Helicopter Regiment (269-й отдельный вертолётный полк (269-й овп)) - Malino, Moscow Oblast, RSFSR - Mi-24, Mi-8, Mi-2
- Borisoglebskoye, awarded the Order of the Red Banner and the Order of Lenin Higher Military School for Pilots, named after V. P. Chkalov (Борисоглебское ордена Ленина Краснознамённое военное авиационное училище лётчиков имени В. П. Чкалова) - Borisoglebsk (air base), Voronezh Oblast, RSFSR
  - 160th Instructor Fighter Aviation Regiment (160-й инструкторский истребительный авиационный полк (160-й ииап)) - Borisoglebsk - MiG-21
  - 186th Training Aviation Regiment (186-й учебный авиационный полк (186-й уап)) - Buturlinovka, Voronezh Oblast, RSFSR - MiG-21
  - 123rd Training Aviation Regiment (123-й учебный авиационный полк (123-й уап)) - Zherdyovka, Voronezh Oblast, RSFSR - L-39 (disbanded in 1990)
- Tambovskoye Higher Military School for Pilots, named after M. M. Raskova (Тамбовское военное авиационное училище лётчиков имени М. М. Расковой) - Tambov, Tambov Oblast, RSFSR
  - 127th Training Aviation Regiment (127-й учебный авиационный полк (127-й уап)) - Ryazhsk (Atashovo) - L-39
  - 643rd Training Aviation Regiment (643-й учебный авиационный полк (643-й уап)) - Tula, Tula Oblast, RSFSR - L-39 (disbanded in 1990)
  - 644th Training Aviation Regiment (644-й учебный авиационный полк (644-й уап)) - Michurinsk - L-29
  - 652nd Training Aviation Regiment (652-й учебный авиационный полк (652-й уап)) - Tambov - Tu-134UBL
  - Aircraft Storage Base (обаз) - Tambov - stored MiG-23
- Tambovskoye, awarded the Order of the Red Banner and the Order of Lenin Higher Military Aviation Engineering School, named after F. E. Dzerzhinsky (Тамбовское высшее военное авиационное инженерное ордена Ленина Краснознаменное училище имени Ф. Э. Дзержинского) - Tambov

In addition the following formations, units and establishments were based within the Moscow Military District, but were outside the control of the district's Air Forces:

- 8th Aviation Division of Specific Purpose (8-я авиационная дивизия особого назначения (8-я ад он)) - Chkalovsky - subordinated directly under the Ministry of Defence. The transport aviation regiments provided airlift for high ranking government officials and repositioning of troops at very short notice. The separate squadron provided command and control.
  - 353th Aviation Regiment of Specific Purpose (353-й авиационный полк особого назначения (353-й ап он)) - Chkalovsky - Il-62, Tu-154, Tu-134, Il-18, Il-76, An-72
  - 354th Aviation Regiment of Specific Purpose (354-й авиационный полк особого назначения (354-й ап он)) - Chkalovsky - Il-76, Il-22, An-12, An-26, An-24
  - (355th Aviation Regiment of Specific Purpose (355-й авиационный полк особого назначения (355-й ап он)) - Chkalovsky - disbanded in 1989 and absorbed into the 353rd Aviation Regiment along with its Tu-134 and Tu- 154 aircraft)
  - Separate Composite Aviation Squadron (отдельная смешанная авиационная эскадрилья (осаэ)) - Chkalovsky - Il-80 (4 aircraft), Il-76RT (2 aircraft) (attached to the 8th ADSP for air traffic control, ground support and maintenance, but reporting directly to the Ministry of Defence. The Il-80 was the airborne command center variant of the Il-86 and the Soviet counterpart to the E-4. The four Il-80 received command task force of officers detailed from the Ministry of Defence when on airborne duty. The two Il-76RT were relay aircraft (RT - 'retranslator') and had no command task force on board. They provided Ultra high frequency link between the Soviet nuclear triad and the command centers and were equipped with drag antennae array, which could extend to a total length of 6 kilometers. The Navy's SSBNs and the Air Force's Long Range Aviation normally used alternative communications channels, so the main task for the Il-76RTs remained to provide a link to the Strategic Rocket Forces. The command and control system was designated "Chain Link" ("Звено") and included the Il-80s, the Il-76RTs, the underground silo-based 'Perimetr' and the railway-based 'Gorn' command alert missiles.)
- 12th Mginskaya Red Banner Military Transport Aviation Division, Tver, RSFSR - part of the Military Transport Aviation branch of the Air Force
  - 566th Solnechnogorskiy, awarded the Order of the Red Banner and the Order of Kutuzov Military Transport Aviation Regiment (566-й Солнечногорский Краснознаменный ордена Кутузова военно-транспортный авиационный полк), Seshta (near Bryansk), RSFSR - Antonov An-124
  - 978th Military Transport Aviation Regiment (978-й военно-транспортный авиационный полк), Seshta (near Bryansk), RSFSR - Antonov An-124 (2 squadrons), Ilyushin Il-76 (1 squadron)
  - 8th Military Transport Aviation Regiment (8-й военно-транспортный авиационный полк), Tver, RSFSR - Antonov An-22
  - 81st Military Transport Aviation Regiment (81-й военно-транспортный авиационный полк), Ivanovo - Severny - Antonov An-22
- 4th Center for Combat Training and Re-qualification of Flight Personnel (4-й Центр боевого применения и переучивания лётного состава) - Lipetsk, Lipetsk Oblast, RSFSR - MiG-25RB, MiG-29, MiG-27, Su-24, Su-17М, Su-25 - fighter pilot training and re-qualification
- 1046th Training Aviation Center (1046-й учебный авиационный центр) - Shatalovo, Smolensk Oblast, RSFSR - MiG-25RB, Su-24MR, Su-17M3R - training pilots for the reconnaissance aviation
- HQ 37th Air Army of the High Command (Strategic Purpose) (штаб 37-й воздушной армии ВГК СН) - Moscow, RSFSR - strategic aviation
- HQ 46th Red Banner Air Army of the High Command (Strategic Purpose) (штаб 46-й воздушной армии ВГК СН) - Smolensk, SMolensk Oblast, RSFSR - strategic aviation

=== Order of Lenin Moscow Air Defence District ===
Unlike the Air Forces of the Moscow Military District, which were part of the district, the units and formations of the Air Defence Forces were kept separate, reporting to their own Main Staff. The Moscow MD came under the air defence umbrella of the Moscow Air Defence District (Московский ордена Ленина округа ПВО), which was the sole such district within the ADF.

- District Command and Staff (Командование и штаб округа) - Moscow, RSFSR
- 118th District Communications Nod (118-й узел связи округа) - Moscow
- 436th Separate Transport Aviation Regiment (436-й отдельный транспортный авиационный полк) - Stupino, Moscow Oblast, RSFSR - An-12, An-26, An-24, Mi-8
- 1082nd Separate Automobile Battalion of the Moscow District of Air Defence, awarded the Order of Lenin (1082-й отдельный ордена Ленина Московского Округа ПВО автомобилный батальон)
- 1st Red Banner Air Defence Army of Specific Purpose (1-я Краснознамённая армия ПВО особого назначения) - Balashikha, Moscow Oblast, RSFSR
  - 1082nd Command Post (1082-й командный пункт) - Balashikha
  - 9th Communications Nod (9-й узел связи) - Balashikha
  - 2366th Separate Cable Communications Battalion (2366-й отдельный батальон кабельной связи) - Mytishchi, Moscow Oblast, RSFSR
  - 1081st Separate Automobile Battalion (1081-й отдельный автомобилный батальон)
  - 1092nd Separate Automobile Battalion (1092-й отдельный автомобилный батальон)
  - 669th Separate Equipment Service and Overhaul Battalion (669-й отдельный батальон по обслуживанию и восстановлению техники) - Istra, Moscow Oblast, RSFSR
  - - 26 S-300 missile air defence regiments between the four divisions -
  - 52nd Radio-Technical Brigade (52-я отдельная радиотехническая бригада) - Mytishchi
    - 4 separate radio-technical battalions (sing. отдельный радиотехнический батальон):
      - 2317th (Kashira), 2318th (Kosteryovo), 2319th (Savyolovo) and 2320th (Goretovo, Moscow Oblast)
  - 86th Air Defence Division of Specific Purpose (86-я дивизия ПВО специального назначения) - Vidnoye
    - 499th Separate Signals Battalion (499-й отдельный батальон связи) - Vidnoye
    - 6 missile air defence regiments (sing. зенитный ракетный полк):
      - 635th (Stepanshchino village), 628th (Torbeyevo), 705th (Nizhnee Shakhlovo), 16th (Fenino), 614th (Pestovo) and 549th (Klyonovo)
    - 9th Radio-Technical Regiment (9-й радиотехнический полк) - Kashira
    - 1486th Missile Technical Base (1486-я ракетная техническая база) - Tolbino
    - 225th Technical Base (225-я техническая база) - Belye Stolby
  - 87th Air Defence Division of Specific Purpose (87-я дивизия ПВО специального назначения) - Balashikha
    - 501st Separate Signals Battalion (501-й отдельный батальон связи) - Balashikha
    - 6 missile air defence regiments:
      - 674th (Yakovlevo), 799th (Dubky), 654th (Kashino), 756th (Novoye), 629th (Kablukovo) and 606th (Zakharovo)
    - 14th Radio-Technical Regiment (14-й радиотехнический полк) - Kosteryovo
    - 1488th Missile Technical Base (1488-я ракетная техническая база) - Makarovo
    - 194th Technical Base (194-я техническая база) - Fryazevo
  - 88th Air Defence Division of Specific Purpose (88-я дивизия ПВО специального назначения) - Dolgoprudny
    - 187th Separate Signals Battalion (187-й отдельный батальон связи) - Dolgoprudny
    - 7 missile air defence regiments:
      - 789th (Vvedyonskoye (Klin-7 military encampment)), 17th (Borozda (Klin-9 military encampment)), 658th (Maloye Rogachyovo), 722nd (Kovrigino), 748th (Yeryomino), 584th (Maryno) and 566th (Dubrovka)
    - 21st Radio-Technical Regiment (21-й радиотехнический полк) - Savyolovo
    - 1491st Missile Technical Base (1491-я ракетная техническая база) - Trudovaya
  - 89th Air Defence Division of Specific Purpose (89-я дивизия ПВО специального назначения) - Odintsovo
    - 250th Separate Signals Battalion (250-й отдельный батальон связи) - Odintsovo
    - 7 missile air defence regiments:
      - 791st (Vorsino), 662nd (Nesteryovo), 650th (Denkovo), 6th (Arkhangelskoye), 709th (Lyskovo), 612th (Glagolevo) and 625th (Funkovo)
    - 25th Radio-Technical Regiment (25-й радиотехнический полк) - Goretovo
    - 1494th Missile Technical Base (1494-я ракетная техническая база) - Istra
    - 190th Technical Base (190-я техническая база) - Golitsyno
- 2nd Air Defence Corps (2-й корпус ПВО) - Rzhev, Tver Oblast, RSFSR
  - Corps Command and Staff (управление корпуса)
  - Corps Command Post (командный пункт корпуса)
  - Corps Automatised Command and Control Systems Center (центр АСУ корпуса)
  - 4 fighter aviation regiments
    - 28th Guards Leningradskiy, awarded the Order of Kutuzov Fighter Aviation Regiment of the Air Defence Forces (28-й гвардейский истребительный авиационный Ленинградский ордена Кутузова полк ПВО) - Krichev, Mogilyov Oblast, Belarus SSR - MiG-25P/U (not to be confused with the 28th FAR)
    - 790th Awarded the Order of Kutuzov Fighter Aviation Regiment of the Air Defence Forces (790-й истребительный авиационный ордена Кутузова полк ПВО) - Khotilovo (Noviy), Tver Oblast, RSFSR - MiG-25P/U
    - 28th Fighter Aviation Regiment of the Air Defence Forces (28-й истребительный авиационный полк ПВО) - Andreapol, Tver Oblast, RSFSR - MiG-23P/UB (not to be confused with the 28th Guards FAR)
    - 401st Fighter Aviation Regiment of the Air Defence Forces (401-й истребительный авиационный полк ПВО) - Smolensk (Severniy), Smolensk Oblast, RSFSR - MiG-23P/UB
  - 6 missile air defence regiments:
    - 242nd Guards (Mozhaysk), 47th (Turginovo), 195th (Valday), 210th Red Star (Dubrovka), 713th (Narynka (Klin-10 military encampment), Klinsky District) and 1281th (Toropets)
  - 3rd Radio-Technical Brigade (3-я радиотехническая бригада) - Rzhev (Port (Rzhev-3) military encampment), Tver Oblast, RSFSR
- 3rd Air Defence Corps (3-й корпус ПВО) - Yaroslavl, Yaroslavl Oblast, RSFSR
  - Corps Command and Staff (управление корпуса)
  - Corps Command Post (командный пункт корпуса)
  - Corps Automatised Command and Control Systems Center (центр АСУ корпуса)
  - 124th Communications Nod (124-й узел связи) - Yaroslavl
  - 114th Separate Radio-Relay Battalion (114-й отдельный радио-релейный батальон)
  - 380th Separate Electronic Warfare Battalion (380-й отдельный батальон РЭБ)
  - 2 fighter aviation regiments
    - 415th Fighter Aviation Regiment of the Air Defence Forces (415-й истребительный авиационный полк ПВО) - Tunoshna (Yaroslavl), Yaroslavl Oblast, RSFSR - MiG-23P
    - 611th Fighter Aviation Regiment of the Air Defence Forces (611-й истребительный авиационный полк ПВО) - Dorokhovo (Bezhetsk), Tver Oblast, RSFSR - Su-15
  - 79th Guards Missile Air Defence Brigade (79-я гвардейская зенитно-ракетная бригада) - Pitino village (near Cherepovets), Vologda Oblast, RSFSR
  - 7 missile air defence regiments:
    - 48th (Yaroslavl), 164th (Kimry), 380th (Verkhnehovolskiy), 474th (Ogarkovo), 485th (?), 488th (Susanino) and 1257th (Pereslavl-Zalesskiy)
  - 6th Red Banner Radio-Technical Brigade (6-я радиотехническая Краснознамённая бригада) - Yaroslavl, Yaroslavl Oblast, RSFSR
  - 66th Radio-Technical Regiment (66-й радиотехнический полк) - Vologda, Vologda Oblast, RSFSR (disbanded on 22.02. 1989 and absorbed into the 6th RTBde)
- 7th Air Defence Corps - (7-й корпус ПВО) - Bryansk, Bryansk Oblast, RSFSR
  - Corps Command and Staff (управление корпуса)
  - Corps Command Post (командный пункт корпуса)
  - Corps Automatised Command and Control Systems Center (центр АСУ корпуса)
  - 208th Communications Nod (208-й узел связи) - Bryansk
  - 2 fighter aviation regiments
    - 191st Fighter Aviation Regiment of the Air Defence Forces (191-й истребительный авиационный полк ПВО) - Yefremov - MiG-23P/UB
    - 472nd Fighter Aviation Regiment of the Air Defence Forces (472-й истребительный авиационный полк ПВО) - Kursk (Vostochny), Kursk Oblast, RSFSR - MiG-23P/UB
  - 8 missile air defence regiments:
    - 80th Guards (Stukalovo village near Tula), 493rd Guards Venskiy, awarded the Order of the Red Banner, the Order of Kutuzov and the Order of Alexander Nevsky (Ryazan), 108th Tulskiy (Shilovo village near Voronezh), 260th Red Banner (Bryansk), 326th (Podolsk), 559th (?), 791st (?) and 1284th (Yerdenyovo village near Maloyaroslavets)
  - 41st Radio-Technical Brigade (41-я радиотехническая бригада) - Oryol
- 16th Air Defence Corps - (16-й корпус ПВО) - Gorky, Gorky Oblast, RSFSR
  - Corps Command and Staff (управление корпуса)
  - Corps Command Post (командный пункт корпуса)
  - Corps Automatised Command and Control Systems Center (центр АСУ корпуса)
  - 101st Communications Nod (101-й узел связи) - Gorky
  - 904th Separate Radio-Relay Signals Battalion (904-й отдельный радиорелейный батальон) - Gorky
  - 412th Separate Electronic Warfare Battalion (412-й отдельный батальон РЭБ) - Gorky
  - 2 fighter aviation regiments
    - 153rd Fighter Aviation Regiment of the Air Defence Forces (153-й истребительный авиационный полк ПВО) - Morshansk, Tambov Oblast, RSFSR - Su-15 (converted to MiG-31 in 1990)
    - 786th Fighter Aviation Regiment of the Air Defence Forces (786-й истребительный авиационный полк ПВО) - Pravdinsk, Gorky Oblast, RSFSR - MiG-31
  - 72nd Missile Air Defence Brigade (72-я зенитно-ракетная бригада) - Gorodets, Gorky Oblast, RSFSR
  - 4 missile air defence regiments:
    - 371st Guards Bobruysko-Berlinskiy, awarded the Order of the Red Banner, the Order of Alexander Nevsky, the Order of Kutuzov and the Order of Bogdan Khmelnitsky (Kosteryovo, Vladimir Oblast), 291st (Neya village, Kostroma Oblast), 356th (Sharya, Kostroma Oblast) and 387th (Arzamas 16)(often mentioned as the most secretive closed city within the USSR)
  - 9th Radio-Technical Brigade (9-я радиотехническая бригада) - Gorky
  - 65th Radio-Technical Regiment (65-й радиотехнический полк) - Morshansk

== Post-Cold war ==
=== Order of battle c. 2006 ===
The District had around 75,000 troops assigned and consisted of the following formations. The entire Ground Forces began to go through a major reorganisation (the 2008 Russian military reform), which apparently began in March 2009, in which armies become operational commands and divisions were redesignated brigades.

- 1st Separate Rifle Brigade for Security of the Ministry of Defence premises (1-я отдельная стрелковая бригада охраны МО) - Moscow. Disbanded 2008, and absorbed by the 27th independent Guards Motor Rifle Brigade.
- 2nd Tamanskaya Guards Motor Rifle Division
- 34th Guards Perekop Red Banner Order of Suvorov Artillery Division, Mulino (Gorokhovets)
- 27th Guards Sevastopol Motor Rifle Brigade, Tyoply Stan (or possibly Mosrentgen as the two districts are adjacent, hugging the border between Moscow city and Moscow Oblast at the time)
- 112th Guards Rocket Brigade (Shuya) (Tochka SSM)
- 20th Guards Army (to operational command)
  - 4th Guards Kantemirovskaya Tank Division, (to brigade)
  - 10th Guards Uralsko-Lvovskaya Tank Division, гвардейская танковая Уральско-Львовская дивизия (to brigade)
  - 397th MRL Regiment (Skopin)
  - 448th Rocket Brigade (Kursk) (Tochka SSM)
  - 4944th Base for Storage of Weapons and Equipment (Yelnya)(former 144 Guards MRD)
  - other units
- 22nd Army, 22-я армия, Nizhni Novgorod (appears to be disbanding)
  - 3rd Vislenskaya Motor Rifle Division, Mulino, мотострелковая Вислянская дивизия (splitting into two brigades)
  - 5th Anti-Aircraft Rocket Brigade (Shuya)
  - 50th Rocket Brigade (Shuya) (Tochka SSM)
  - 211th Artillery Brigade (Mulino)
  - 918th Multiple Rocket Launcher Regiment (Mulino)
  - Base for Storage of Weapons and Equipment (Tver) (ex 166th Motor Rifle Brigade)
  - other units
- Operational Group of Russian Forces in Moldova (Tiraspol) (formerly 14th Guards Army)
  - (two?) separate battalions, formerly from the 8th Guards Motor Rifle Brigade
- 16th Spetsnaz Brigade, 16-я бригада спецназа
- 467th Guards District Training Centre (Kovrov) (included 44th Guards Tank Training Regiment, Vladimir)
- 16th Air Army
- other formations and units

In addition to normal units, the district was home at least until 2001 to the 11th Separate Cavalry Regiment (ru:11-й отдельный кавалерийский полк), a unit used for producing war films. The unit was based at Kobyakovo.

=== Order of Lenin Moscow Military District 2010 ===
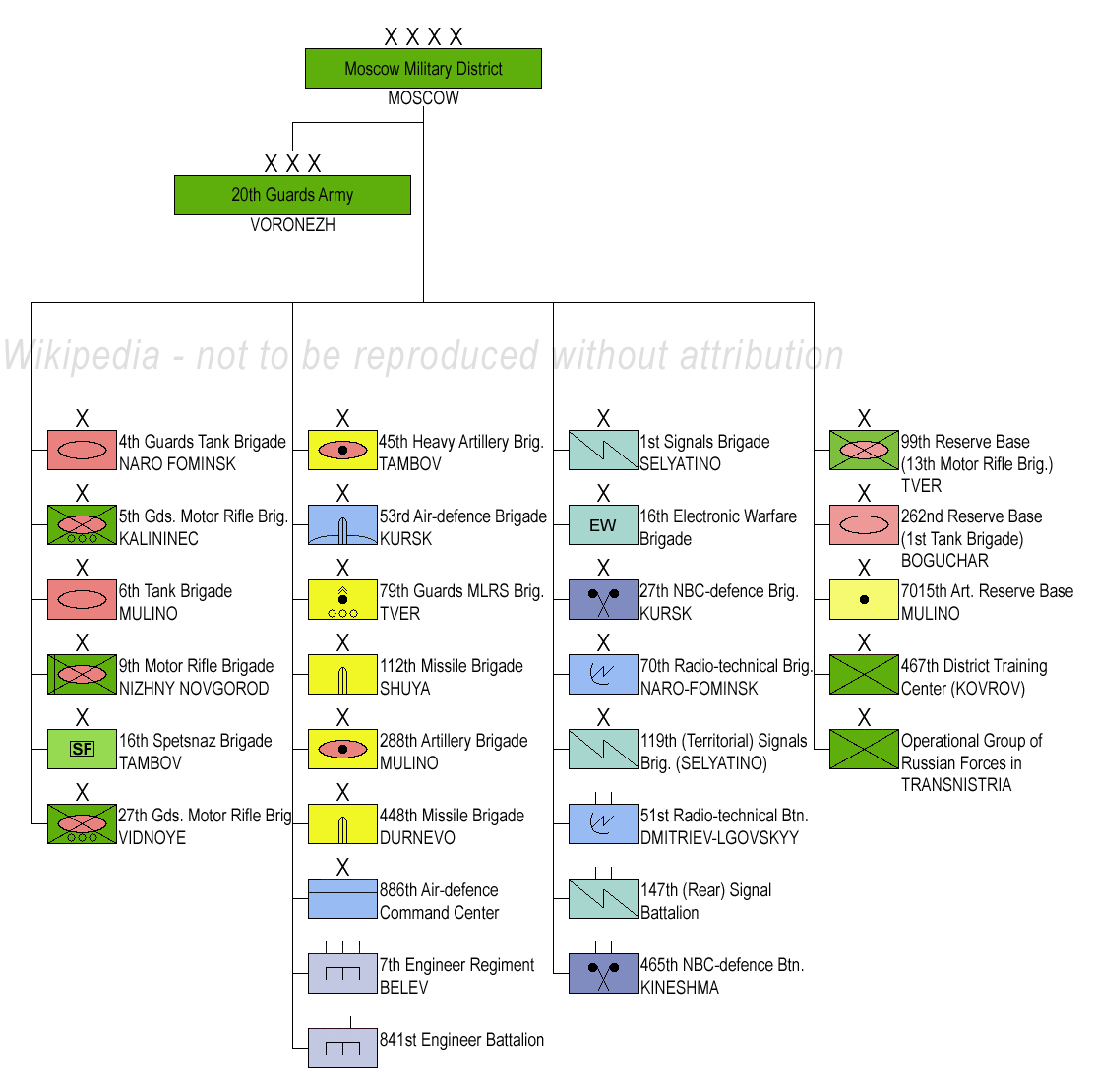
Structure and units of the Moscow Military District 2010

- Combat formations:
  - 4th Guards Independent Tank Brigade "Kantemir", in Naro-Fominsk
  - 5th Guards Independent Motor-Rifle Brigade "Taman", in Kalininec equipped with BTR
  - 6th Independent Tank Brigade "Chentokhovskaya", in Mulino
  - 9th Guards Independent Motor-Rifle Brigade, in Nizhny Novgorod equipped with BMP
  - 16th Independent Spetsnaz Brigade, in (Tambov)
  - 27th Guards Sevastopol Motor Rifle Brigade, in Vidnoye equipped with BMP
  - Operational Group of Russian Forces (in Transnistria)
  - 99th Reserve Base (13th Independent Motor-Rifle Brigade), in Tver
  - 262nd Reserve Base (1st Independent Tank Brigade), in Boguchar
  - 467th Guards District Training Centre, in Kovrov
- Missile and Artillery formations:
  - 45th Heavy Artillery Brigade "Svir", in Tambov
  - 79th Guards MLRS Brigade, in Tver
  - 112th Guards Missile Brigade, in Shuya
  - 288th Artillery Brigade "Warsaw-Brandenburg", in Mulino
  - 448th Missile Brigade, in Durnevo
  - 7015th Artillery Reserve Base, in Mulino
- Air-defence formations:
  - 53rd Air-defence Missile Brigade, in Kursk equipped with the Buk missile system
  - 886th Air-defence Command Center
- Radar formations:
  - 70th Independent Radio Technical Brigade, in Naro-Fominsk
  - 51st Independent Radio Technical Battalion, in Dmitriev-Lgovskyy
- Engineering formations:
  - 7th Independent Engineer Regiment, in Belev
  - 841st Independent Engineer Battalion
- NBC-defence formations:
  - 27th Independent NBC-defence Brigade, in Kursk
  - 465th Independent NBC-defence Battalion, in Kineshma
- Signal formations:
  - 1st Signal Brigade "Sevastopol", in Selyatino
  - 16th Independent Electronic Warfare Brigade
  - 119th Signal Brigade, in Selyatino
  - 147th Independent (Rear) Signal Battalion

Formations of the Airborne Forces, including the 98th Guards Airborne Division and 106th Guards Airborne Division "Tula", also are based within the District's boundaries, but report directly to VDV headquarters.

Army General Vladimir Bakin was the former chief of staff – first deputy commander-in-chief of forces of the Volga-Ural Military District.

== Component units ==
=== Direct reporting units and formations ===
- Operational Group of Russian Forces in the Transnistrian region of the Republic of Moldova (Tiraspol, Transnistria)
  - 82nd Motorized Rifle Battalion
  - 113th Motorized Rifle Battalion
  - 540th Separate Command Battalion
- (1st) Semyonovsky Regiment (Zyuzino Selo)
- 29th (Bryansk), 34th (Yaroslavl) and 38th Railway Brigades of the Russian Railway Troops
- 1st Guards Engineer Brigade (Murom)
- 45th Guards Berlin Engineering Brigade, Russian Engineer Troops (Murom)
- 27th Brigade, Russian NBC Protection Troops (Shikhany)
- 28th Guards Pontoon-Bridge Brigade (Murom)
- 45th High-Power Artillery Brigade "Svir" (Tambov)
- 79th Guards Rocket Artillery Brigade (Tver)
- 15th Electronic Warfare Brigade (Stroitel)
- 16th Electronic Warfare Brigade (Plavsk, says Galeotti 2017, Kursk-MZS, says Muzyka 2020)
- 82nd Separate Radio Technical Special Purpose Brigade (Vyazma)
- 146th Special Purpose Radio Engineer Brigade (Bugry)
- 5th Repair and Restoration Regiment (Zaraisk)
- 45th Separate Engineer-Camouflage Regiment (HQ in Inzhenernyy, Vladimir Oblast; formation in June 2017
- 100th Separate Support Regiment (Alabino, Moscow Oblast)
- 22nd Central Base for Reserve Tanks (Buy, Kostroma Oblast)
- 210th Guards Interspecific Regional Training Kovel Red Banner Center (engineering troops) (Kstovo)
- 467th Guards District Training Centre (Kovrov)
- 333rd Combat Training Center of the Ground Forces, Airborne Forces and Coastal Forces of the Navy (Gorokhovets Artillery Range)
- 1084th Interspecific Center for Training and Combat Use of Electronic Warfare Troops (Tambov)

=== Ground forces ===
1st Guards Tank Army

- 2nd Guards Motor Rifle Division (в/ч 23626)
  - 1st Guards Motor Rifle Regiment (в/ч 31135)
  - 15th Guards Motor Rifle Regiment (в/ч 31134)
  - 1st Guards Tank Regiment (в/ч 58198)
  - 136th Reconnaissance Battalion (в/ч 51387)
  - 147th Self-Propelled Artillery Regiment (в/ч 73966)
  - 1174th Anti-Tank Battalion (в/ч 51381)
  - 1117th Anti-Aircraft Missile Regiment (в/ч 51382)
- 4th Guards Tank Division (в/ч 19612)
  - 12th Guards Tank Regiment (в/ч 31985)
  - 13th Guards Tank Regiment (в/ч 32010)
  - 423rd Motor Rifle Regiment (в/ч 91701)
  - 137th Reconnaissance Battalion (в/ч 54919)
  - 275th Self Propelled Artillery Regiment (в/ч 73941)
  - 49th Anti-Aircraft Missile Brigade (в/ч 21555)
  - 538th Guards Anti-Aircraft Missile Regiment (в/ч 51383)
- 47th Tank Division (в/ч 54096)
  - 26th Tank Regiment
  - 153rd Tank Regiment
  - 245th Guards Motor Rifle Regiment
  - 272nd Motor Rifle Regiment
  - 380th Motorized Rifle Regiment
  - 4th Volunteer Assault Brigade (Egyptian volunteers)
  - 7th Reconnaissance Battalion
- 27th Motorized Rifle Brigade (в/ч 61899)
- 96th Reconnaissance Brigade (в/ч 52634)
- 112th Missile Brigade (в/ч 03333)
- 288th Artillery Brigade (в/ч 30683)

20th Guards Combined Arms Army

- 3rd Motor Rifle Division (в/ч 54046) (Valuyki)
  - 252nd Motor Rifle Regiment (в/ч 91711)
  - 752nd Guards Motor Rifle Regiment (в/ч 34670)
  - 237th Guards Tank Regiment (в/ч 91726)
  - 84th Reconnaissance Battalion (в/ч 22263)
  - 99th Self-Propelled Artillery Regiment (в/ч 91727)
  - 159th Separate Anti-Tank Battalion (в/ч 81989)
  - 1143rd Separate Anti-Aircraft Missile Battalion (в/ч 48422)
- 144th Guards Motor Rifle Division (в/ч 23060) (Yelnya)
  - 254th Guards Motor Rifle Regiment (в/ч 91704)
  - 488th Guards Motor Rifle Regiment (в/ч 12721)
  - 59th Guards Tank Regiment (в/ч 94018)
  - 148th Reconnaissance Battalion (в/ч 23872)
  - 856th Guards Self-Propelled Artillery Regiment (в/ч 23857)
  - 1259th Separate Anti-Tank Artillery Battalion
  - 673rd Separate Anti-Aircraft Missile Battalion (в/ч 53821)
- 236th Guards Artillery Brigade (в/ч 53195) (Kolomna)
- 448th Rocket Brigade (в/ч 35535) (Kursk)
- 53rd Guards Anti-Aircraft Missile Brigade (в/ч 32406) (Kursk)
- 99th Weapons and Equipment Storage Base (Tver)
- 7015th Weapons and Equipment Storage Base (Mulino)
- 152nd Logistic Support Brigade (Liski)
- 9th Guards Command Brigade (Voronezh)
- Battalion of the 82nd Separate Radio Engineering Special Purpose Brigade

== Commanders ==
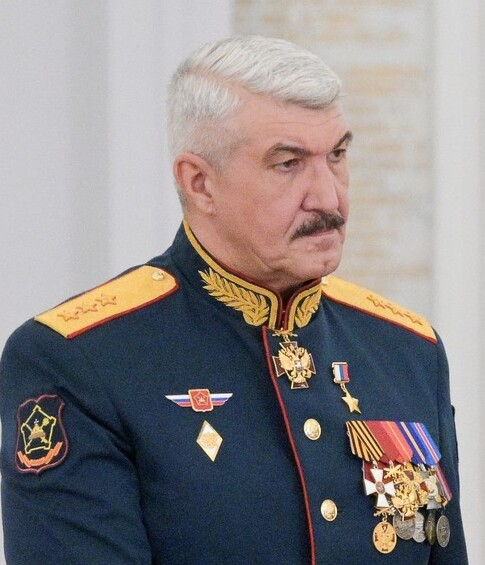
Colonel General Sergey Kuzovlev

| Rank | Name | Term start | Term end |
Russian Empire (1864–1917)
| General of Infantry | Alexander von Güldenstubbe | August 10, 1864 | April 17, 1879 |
| Adjutant General, General of the Cavalry | Pontus Brevern-de la Gardie | April 17, 1879 | August 30, 1888 |
| Adjutant General, General of Artillery | Apostol Kostanda | August 30, 1888 | May 1896 |
| Adjutant General, Lieutenant General | Grand Duke Sergei Alexandrovich of Russia | May 1896 | February 4, 1905 |
| General of Infantry | Nikolai Nikolayevich Malakhov | February 4, 1905 | January 15, 1906 |
| Lieutenant General | Sergei Konstantinovich Gershelman | January 15, 1906 | March 17, 1909 |
| General of the Cavalry | Paul von Plehwe | March 17, 1909 | July 19, 1914 |
| General of Infantry | Alexander G. Sandetsky | July 19, 1914 | May 5, 1915 |
| Adjutant General, Lieutenant General | Prince Felix Felixovitch Soumarokov-Elston | May 5, 1915 | June 19, 1915 |
| General of Infantry | Petr. D. Olkhovsky | July 1915 | September 22, 1915 |
| General of Artillery | Iosif Mrozovsky | September 22, 1915 | March 1, 1917 |
| Lieutenant Colonel | Alexander E. Gruzinov | March 1917 | April 1917 |
| Colonel | Aleksander Verkhovsky | May 31, 1917 | August 30, 1917 |
| Lieutenant Colonel | Konstantin I. Ryabtsev | September 1917 | November 1917 |
Soviet Union (1918-1991)
| | Nikolay Muralov | November 1917 | February 1919 |
| | Sergey Natsarenus | March 1919 | June 1919 |
| | Aleksandr Burdukov | June 1919 | December 1920 |
| | Pavel Petryaev | December 1920 | February 1921 |
| | Nikolay Muralov | March 1921 | April 1924 |
| | Kliment Voroshilov | April 1924 | November 1925 |
| | Georgy Bazilevich | November 1925 | May 1927 |
| | Boris Shaposhnikov | May 1927 | January 1928 |
| Commandarm | August Kork | 1930 | 1935 |
| Comcor | Boris Gorbachyov | 1935 | |
| Commandarm 1st Rank | Ivan Belov | 1935 | 1937 |
| Marshal of the Soviet Union | Semyon Budyonny | 1937 | 1939 |
| General of the Army | Ivan Tyulenev | 1939 | 1941 |
| Colonel General | Pavel Artemyev | 1944 | 1947 |
| Marshal of the Soviet Union | Kirill Meretskov | 1947 | 1949 |
| Colonel General | Pavel Artemyev | 1949 | June 1953 |
| General of the Army | Kirill Moskalenko | June 1953 | October 1960 |
| Marshal of the Soviet Union | Nikolay Krylov | October 1960 | 4 March 1963 |
| General of the Army | Afanasy Beloborodov | 5 March 1963 | 1968 |
| Colonel General | Yevgeny Ivanovsky | 1968 | 1972 |
| General of the Army | Vladimir Govorov | 1972 | 1980 |
| General of the Army | Petr Lushev | 1980 | June 1985 |
| Colonel General | Vladimir Arkhipov | June 1985 | August 1988 |
| General of the Army | Konstantin Kochetov | August 1988 | May 1989 |
| Colonel General | Nikolai Kalinin | May 1989 | September 1991 |
| Lieutenant General | Vladimir Toporov | September 1991 | 17 May 1992 |
Russian Federation (1991-2010)
| Colonel General | Leonty Kuznetsov | 1992 | 1999 |
| Colonel General | Igor Puzanov | 1999 | 2001 |
| Colonel General | Nikolai Makarov | 2001 (acting) | |
| General of the Army | Ivan Efremov | 2001 | 2005 |
| General of the Army | Vladimir Bakin | 2005 | 2009 |
| Colonel General | Valery Gerasimov | 2009 | 2010 |
Reconstituted MMD (2024-present)
| Colonel General | Sergey Kuzovlev | 16 May 2024 | Incumbent |

== Sources ==
- Feskov, V. I.; Golikov, V. I.; Kalashnikov, K. A.; Slugin, S. A. (2013). Вооруженные Силы СССР после Второй мировой войны: от Красной Армии к Советской (часть 1: Сухопутные войска) [The Soviet Armed Forces after WWII: from the Red Army into the Soviet Army (Volume 1: Land Forces)]. Tomsk: ООО «Издательство научно-технической литературы» [Scientific and Technical Literature Publishing House Ltd.] ISBN 978-5-89503-530-6.
- Galeotti, Mark (2017). The Modern Russian Army 1992–2016. Elite 217. Oxford: Osprey. ISBN 978-1-47281-908-6.
- "Russian Ground Forces Order of Battle" (PDF). Institute for the Study of War. 2018.
- Muzyka, Konrad (December 2020). "Russian Forces in the Western Military District" (PDF). CNA Corporation. (Rochan Consulting)
