= Pyre (disambiguation) =

A pyre is a structure used to burn a body as part of a funeral rite or execution.

Pyre or pyres may also refer to:

- Pyre (character), a Marvel Comics character
- Pyre (film), a 2024 film
- Pyre (video game), a 2017 action role-playing video game
- Children of the Pyre, a 2008 documentary film
- Eternal Pyre, a 2006 EP by Slayer
- "Funeral Pyre", a 1981 single by The Jam
- The Funeral Pyre, a Death Metal band
- Pyre (novel), the English translation of Pookuzzhi, a 2013 novel by Perumal Murugan

== See also ==
- Pyro (disambiguation)
- Pyra (disambiguation)
