= Alexander von Güldenstubbe =

Baltic German general of the Imperial Russian Army

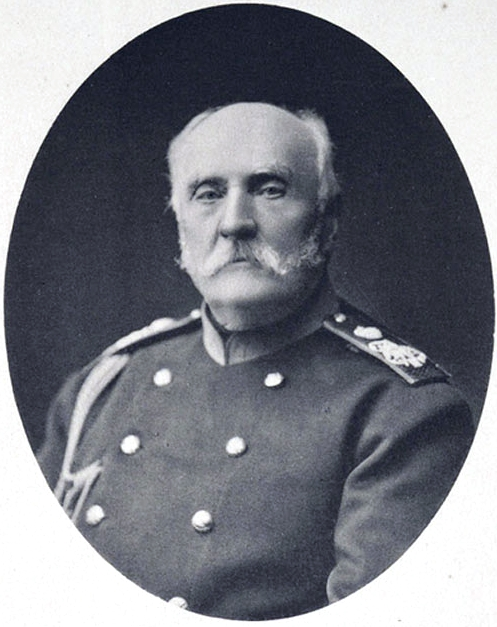
- General of the Infantry Alexander von Güldenstubbe.

Commander of the Moscow Military District
- In office 10 August [O.S. 29 November] 1864 – 17 April [O.S. 5] 1879
- Monarch: Alexander II
- Preceded by: Position established
- Succeeded by: Pontus Brevern-de la Gardie

Personal details
- Born: 7 January [O.S. 27 December 1800] 1801 Kaunifer Manor (et), Karmel, Ösel County, Governorate of Livonia, Russian Empire (in present-day Kaarma, Saare County, Estonia)
- Died: 23 April [O.S. 11] 1884 (aged 83) St. Petersburg, Russian Empire
- Resting place: Karmel (present-day Kaarma, Estonia)
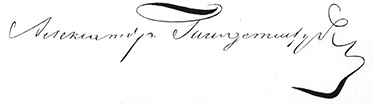
- Signature

Military service
- Allegiance: Russian Empire
- Branch/service: Imperial Russian Army
- Years of service: 1818 – 1884
- Commands: 1st Brigade, 1st Grenadier Division; Semyonovsky Life Guards Regiment; 1st Brigade, 1st Guards Infantry Division; 1st Grenadier Division; 1st Guards Infantry Division; Moscow Military District (1864–1879)
- Battles/wars: November Uprising; Crimean War

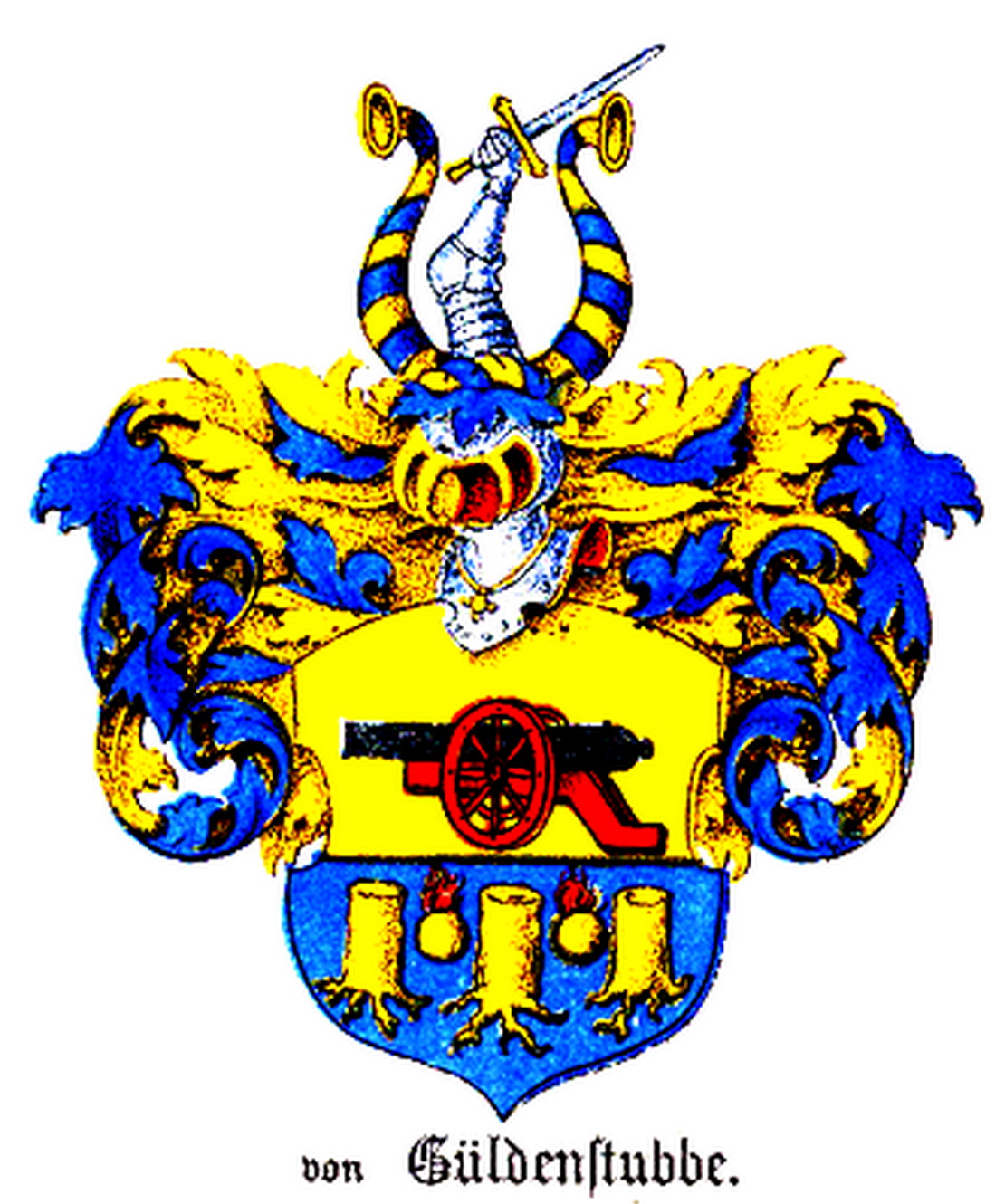
Coat of arms of the Güldenstubbe family (de) of 1751, in the Baltic Coat of arms book by Carl Arvid von Klingspor in 1882.

Magnus Alexander Ludwig von Güldenstubbe (Russian: Алекса́ндр Ива́нович Гильденштуббе, tr. Aleksandr Ivanovich Gilʹdenshtubbe; 7 January [O.S. 27 November 1800] 1801 – 23 April [O.S. 11] 1884) was a Baltic German general of the Imperial Russian Army and commanded the Moscow Military District from 1864 to 1879. He participated in November Uprising in Poland and the Crimean War.

== Biography ==
=== Origin ===
Güldenstubbe was born on 7 January [O.S. 27 December 1800] 1801 (27 December 1800 according to the Julian calendar at use in Russia at the time) in the family estate in Karmel (present-day Kaarma, Estonia), the seventh child of Johann Gustav von Güldenstubbe and Johanna Luise von Ekesparre (de). He was from the Baltic German and Swedish Güldenstubbe family (de), which was originally named Knutzen (or Knutson) and originated from either Holstein or Denmark.

== Awards ==
- Order of St. Vladimir, 4th class (1837)
- Order of St. Vladimir, 3rd class (1845)
- Order of St. George, 4th class (1847)
- Order of St. Stanislaus, 1st class (1848)
- Order of St. Anna, 1st class (1849)
- Order of St. Vladimir, 2nd class (1855)
- Order of the White Eagle (1856)
- Order of St. Alexander Nevsky (1863)
- Order of St. Vladimir, 1st class (1872)
- Order of St. Andrew (1875)

== Notes ==
=== Sources ===
- Essen, Nicolai von. Genealogical Handbook of Oesel's Knighthood. Tartu (1935)
- Welding, Olaf. Baltic German Biographical Dictionary 1710-1960. (1970), from the Baltic Biographical Dictionary Digital

Military offices
Preceded by Position established	Commander of the Moscow Military District; 10 August [O.S. 29 November] 1864 – 17 April [O.S. 5] 1879	Succeeded by Pontus Brevern-de la Gardie
