= Pyra =

Pyra may refer to:

- Pyra (comics)
- Pyra Labs, a Google company which founded the Blogger.com service
- Pyre of Heracles, the ruins of a Doric temple from the 3rd century BC
- Pyra, Russia, an urban-type settlement in Nizhny Novgorod Oblast, Russia
- DragonBox Pyra, a Linux-based handheld computer with gaming controls
- Jakob Immanuel Pyra (1715–1744), German poet
- Pyra, a character from Xenoblade Chronicles 2

== See also ==
- Pyre (disambiguation)
- Große Pyra, river in Saxony, Germany
- Kleine Pyra, river in Saxony, Germany
