= The Human Element =

Studio album by The Standstills
- Released: January 21, 2011
- Genre: Rock Blues Alternative
- Length: 30:28
- Label: Self-Released
- Producer: Jonny Fox Renée Couture

The Standstills chronology
The Standstills EP (2009)	The Human Element (2011)	Pushing Electric (2012)

The Human Element is the debut full-length album released on January 21, 2011 by Oshawa, Ontario rock duo The Standstills. The album was recorded off the floor at a cottage studio in Fenelon Falls, Ontario with engineer Damien Jacobs. The album was self-produced with JUNO Awards winner Dan Brodbeck handling mixing duties. All songs were written by The Standstills except for Black Betty, originally by Ledbelly. A music video was released for Black Betty on June 21, 2011 filmed by Joe Andrus.

== Track listing ==
No.	Title	Length
1.	"Introduction"	0:21
2.	"Black Betty originally by Ledbelly"	2:32
3.	"Blues Radio"	2:54
4.	"Pistol"	2:28
5.	"Carry On"	3:02
6.	"On My Knees"	3:47
7.	"So It Goes"	2:35
8.	"Rise Above"	2:33
9.	"Addiction"	2:50
10.	"Descend"	2:33
11.	"It's Over"	2:36
12.	"Living On The Inside"	2:17
Total length:		30:28
