= Pyro =

Pyro comes from the Greek word πῦρ (pyr), meaning fire. It may refer to:

== Businesses ==
- Pyro Plastics Corporation, a plastic model kit maker 1940s through the 1970s
- Pyro Studios, a computer game developer based in Madrid

== Entertainment ==
- "Pyro" (song), by Kings of Leon, 2010
- "Pyro", a song by T.S.O.L. from their 2001 album Disappear
- "Pyro", a song by Hail the Villain from their 2010 album Population: Declining
- "Pyro", a song by the Standstills from their 2012 album Pushing Electric
- "Pyro", a song by 2:54 from their 2014 album The Other I
- "Pyro", a song by Shinedown from their 2018 album Attention Attention
- "Pyro", a song by Budjerah from his 2021 self-titled EP
- "Pyro (leak 2019)", a song by Denzel Curry and Kenny Beats from their 2020 EP Unlocked
- Pyro (Marvel Comics), a Marvel Comics supervillain
- Pyro (Team Fortress 2), one of the playable classes in the video game
- Pyro... The Thing Without a Face, a 1964 film starring Barry Sullivan and Martha Hyer
- A god in the video game Sacrifice
- One of the seven elements in the video game Genshin Impact

== Other uses ==
- NRK P3 Pyro, a defunct Norwegian digital radio station
- Pyro (horse), an American thoroughbred racehorse
- Pyro, Ohio, United States
- USS Pyro, two U.S. Navy ammunition ships
- Short for pyrotechnics
- Slang for a person afflicted with pyromania, the inability to resist the impulse to deliberately start fires
- Pyro cable, mineral-insulated copper-clad cable (MICC), a fire-resistant electrical cable
- Probabilistic programming language Pyro, extending from PyTorch
- Short for Pyrogallol, a chemical compound used as a black-and-white photographic film developing agent
- Short for pyrovalerone, a stimulant similar to those of the cathinone class

== See also ==
- Pyrrho of Elis (360–270 BC), Greek philosopher, founder of Pyrrhonism
- Pyros (disambiguation)
