= Pyros =

Pyros may refer to:

- Pyros (bomb), a bomb designed for unmanned aerial vehicles
- Pyros (TV series), a Canadian reality TV series
- Pyros, alternate North American title of Wardner (video game)
- Richard Pyros, British actor

== See also ==
- Pyro (disambiguation)
