= From the Devil's Porch =

EP by The Standstills
- Released: August 21, 2015
- Genre: Rock, Blues, Alternative
- Length: 23:42
- Label: eOne Music
- Producer: James Robertson

The Standstills chronology
Pushing Electric (2012)	From the Devil's Porch (2015)

From The Devil's Porch is a 2015 EP released by The Standstills on eOne Music Canada. The lead single off the EP "Orleans" has been rotated heavily on Canadian rock radio and most recently the band released their second single for radio "Rise of the Fall" in early 2016. The band has a music video for "Orleans" which was released on November 27, 2015 and the lead single is also featured in a commercial for Fido.

The album was recorded at Heritage Recording Studio in Streetsville, Ontario with producer James Robertson and mixed by JUNO Award winner Eric Ratz. Here's what the band had to say about recording the new EP: "James is like the crazy musical genius who oversaw everything and Ratz has always been such an amazing, efficient mixer. So it was like having the best of both worlds coming together. We put our faith in Eric and James and it paid off."

== Track listing ==
No.	Title	Length
1.	"The Road"	3:28
2.	"Orleans"	3:20
3.	"Shotgun"	2:57
4.	"Pay No Mind"	3:59
5.	"Soul Taker"	4:36
6.	"Rise of the Fall"	5:22
Total length:		23:42
