= 2:54 =

English rock band

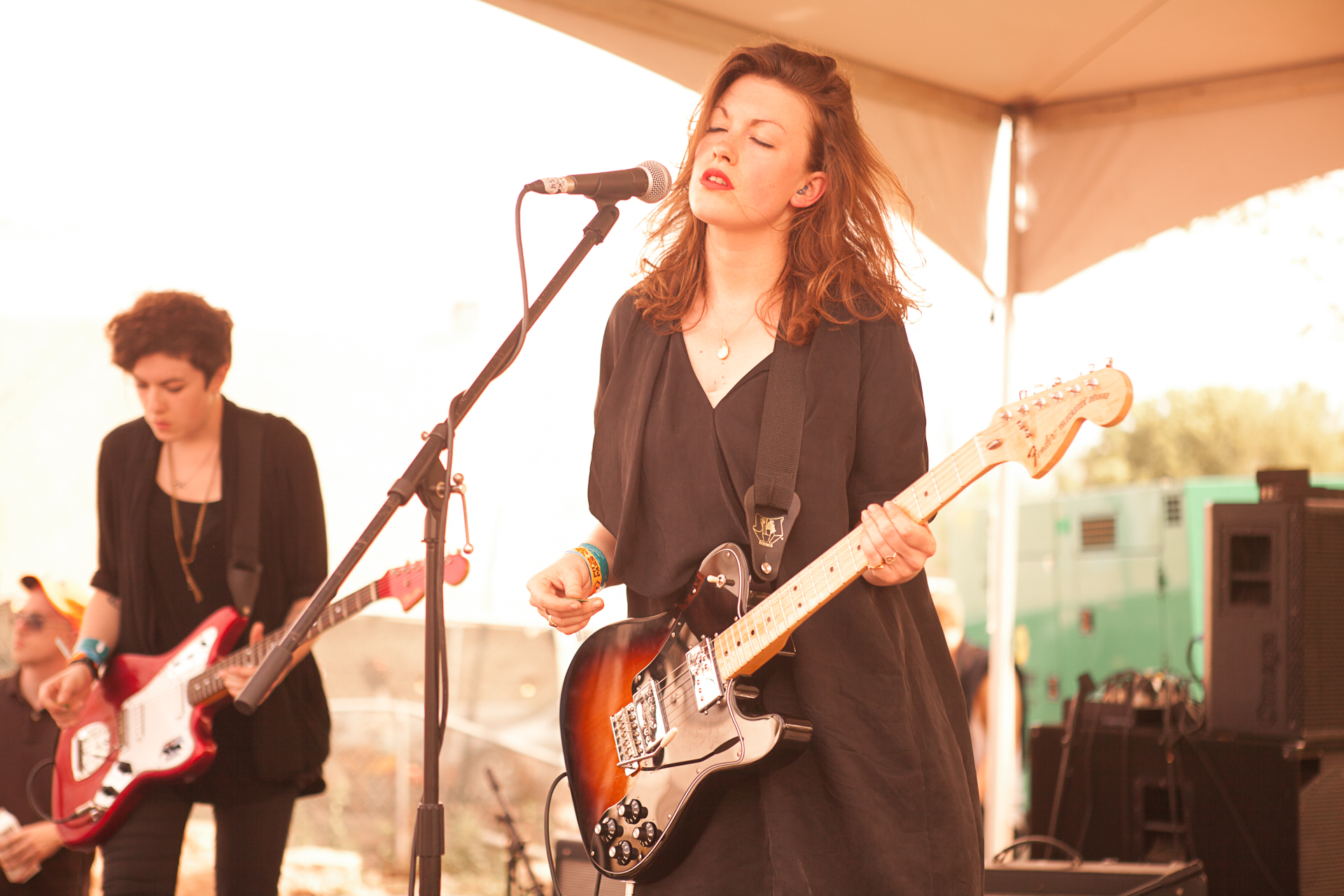
- 2:54 performing in 2012

Background information
- Origin: London, England
- Genres: Alternative rock, shoegaze
- Years active: 2010–present
- Labels: Fiction, Fat Possum, Bella Union
- Spinoff of: Vulgarians
- Members: Colette Thurlow; Hannah Thurlow; Richard Fry; Alex Robins

2:54 is a rock band formed in London in 2010, composed of Irish sisters Colette and Hannah Thurlow. Their songs focus on the shoegaze and alternative rock genres, blending distorted grunge with dreamy atmospherics. They have released 2 studio albums, 2:54(2012), and The Other I(2014). They also released their debut EP, ScarletEP, in 2011.

== History ==
The Thurlow sisters were born in Ireland but spent much of their childhood in Bristol, England after moving there at an early age. In 2007 they formed the punk rock band Vulgarians, and in mid-2010 formed 2:54, named after the timestamp of a drum fill in "A History of Bad Men" by Melvins.

They first came to public attention in 2010 after putting one of their demos online, "Creeping". Their debut single, "On a Wire", was released in 2011 and was followed with "Scarlet"EP on Fiction Records. They toured with Warpaint, Wild Beasts, The Big Pink, The Maccabees, and The xx, and played at several festivals including South by Southwest. The sisters were joined for live shows in 2011 by bassist Joel Porter and drummer Alex Robins.

Their self-titled debut album, recorded with producer Rob Ellis and mixed by Alan Moulder, was released in May 2012 on Fiction in the UK and Fat Possum Records in the US. It received an 8/10 rating from the NME.

The group played a headlining tour in Autumn of 2012. Touring the UK, Europe, and North America. They performed at festivals across the UK, including Reading and Leeds Festival.

In July 2014, 2:54 announced they had signed to the independent record label Bella Union. They released their second album later in the year, "The Other I", produced by Hannah and Colette with James Rutledge. Initially making available a stream of the track "Orion". They embarked upon a UK tour in November 2014. The band also played festivals in mainland Europe. In January 2015, 2:54 released the video for, "Crest".

In March 2015, 2:54 embarked upon a headline tour of North America. The band also performed at South by Southwest that year.

In October 2017, the band played a show at The Tom Thumb Theatre in Margate, followed by another in November at The Pickle Factory, London. The band was showcasing new music.

== Musical style ==
Sian Rowe of The Guardian described them as "a little bit shoegaze, with bursts of heavy riffing and the odd psychedelic meander". They have been compared to bands such as Curve, the Cure and Garbage.

== Discography ==
=== Albums ===
2:54 (2012), Fiction/Fat Possum

1. "Revolving" – 04:01
2. "You're Early" – 04:08
3. "Easy Undercover" – 03:47
4. "A Salute" – 04:24
5. "Scarlet" – 04:41
6. "Sugar" – 04:06
7. "Circuitry" – 04:10
8. "Watcher" – 04:25
9. "Ride" – 03:23
10. "Creeping" – 04:54

The Other I (2014), Bella Union

1. "Orion"
2. "Blindfold"
3. "In The Mirror"
4. "No Better Prize"
5. "Sleepwalker"
6. "Tender Shoots"
7. "The Monaco"
8. "Crest"
9. "Pyro"
10. "South"
11. "Glory Days"
12. "Raptor"

=== Singles ===
- "On a Wire" (2011), House Anxiety
- "Scarlet" (2011), Fiction
- "Creeping" (2012), Fiction
- "You're Early" (2012), Fiction
- "Sugar" (2012), Fiction
- "Orion" (2014), Bella Union
