= Pontus Brevern-de la Gardie =

Russian general of German-Swedish extraction (1840–1890)

Graf Pontus Brevern-de la Gardie
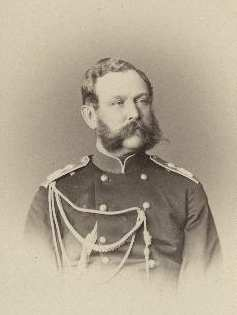
- General of the Cavalry Pontus Brevern-de la Gardie.

Commander of the Kharkov Military District
- In office 6 January [O.S. 27 December 1864] 1865 – 30 August [O.S. 18] 1869
- Monarch: Alexander II
- Preceded by: Sigizmund Merkhilevich
- Succeeded by: Alexander Kartsov

Commander of the Moscow Military District
- In office 17 April [O.S. 5] 1879 – 30 August [O.S. 18] 1888
- Monarchs: Alexander II; Alexander III
- Preceded by: Alexander von Güldenstubbe
- Succeeded by: Apostol Kostanda

Personal details
- Born: 16 January [O.S. 5] 1814 Kostifer Manor (et), Kostifer, Harrien County, Governorate of Estonia, Russian Empire (in present-day Kostivere, Harju County, Estonia)
- Died: 1 April [O.S. 20 March] 1890 (aged 76) Hapsal, Wiek County, Governorate of Estonia, Russian Empire (in present-day Haapsalu, Lääne County, Estonia)

Military service
- Allegiance: Russian Empire
- Branch/service: Imperial Russian Army
- Years of service: 1834 – 1888
- Rank: General of the Cavalry
- Commands: Chevalier Guard Regiment; 1st Brigade, 1st Guards Cavalry Division; 7th Cavalry Division; 1st Guards Cavalry Division; Kharkov Military District (1865-1869); Moscow Military District (1879-1888)

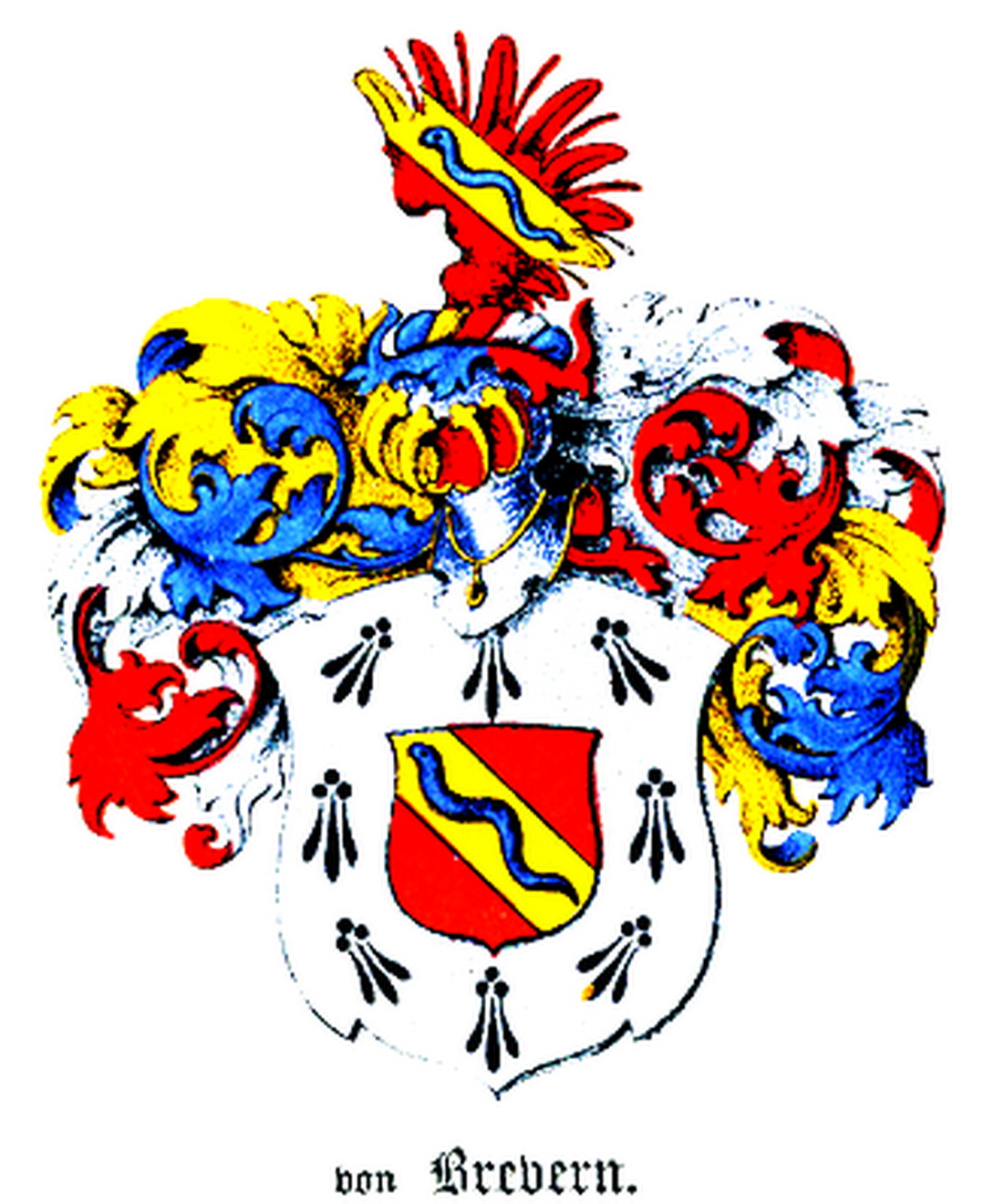
Coat of arms of the Brevern family (de) in the Baltic coat of arms book (et) by Carl Arvid von Klingspor in 1882.

Coat of arms of the De la Gardie family.

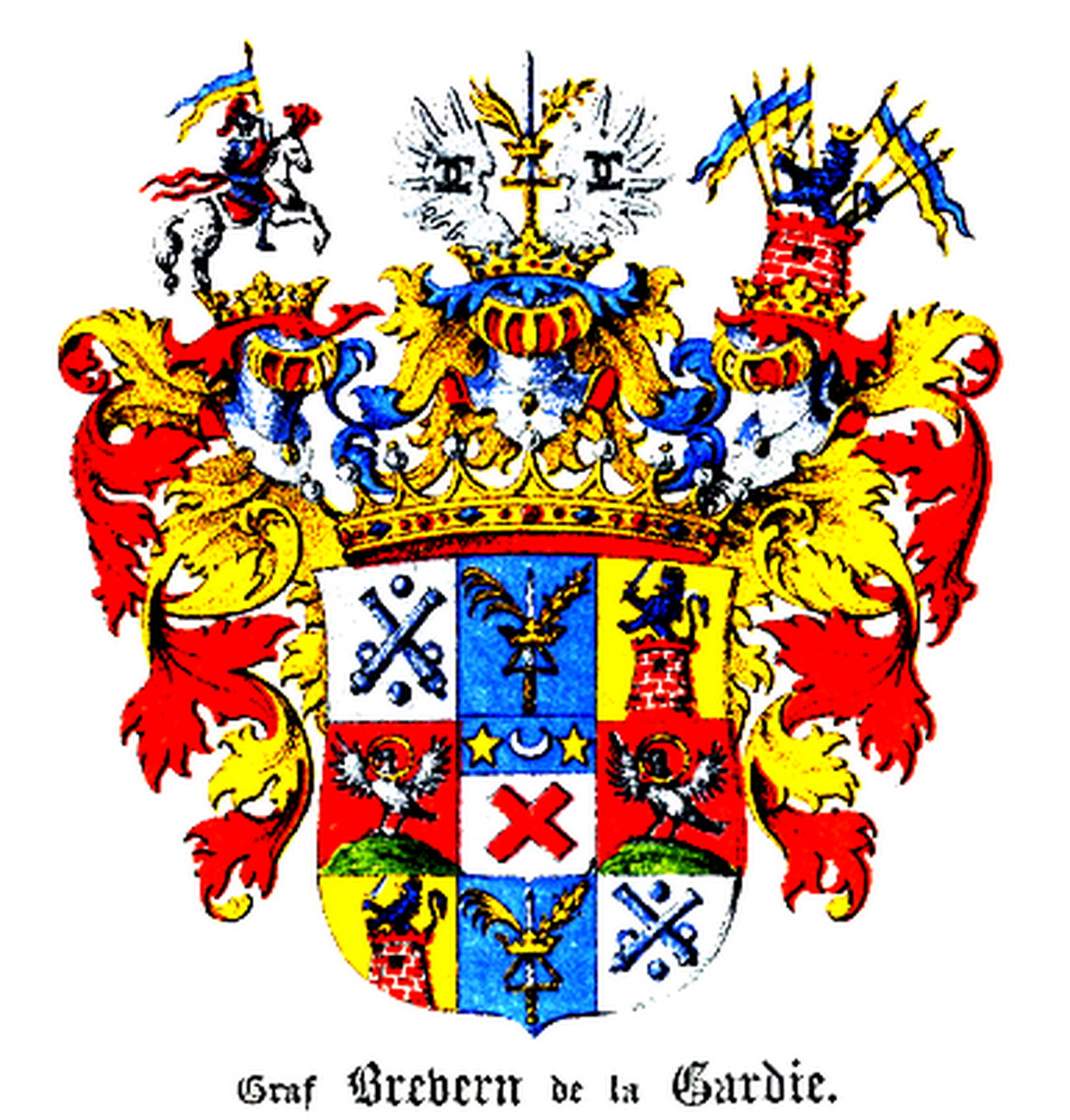
Coat of arms of the Brevern-de la Gardie branch of 1852, in the Baltic coat of arms book by Carl Arvid von Klingspor

Pontus Alexander Ludwig Graf Brevern-de la Gardie (Born von Brevern; Russian: Александр Иванович Бреверн де Лагарди, tr. Aleksandr Ivanovich Brevern de Lagardi; 16 January [O.S. 5] 1814 – 1 April [O.S. 20 March] 1890) was a Swedish count, Baltic German nobleman, military officer and statesman of German, French and Swedish descent, in the service of the Imperial Russian Army who commanded the Kharkov and Moscow Military District form 1865 to 1869 and 1879 to 1888 simultaneously. He was also the chief of staff of the Petersburg Military District from 1862 to 1865.

== Biography ==
=== Origin ===
==== Brevern ====
Pontus Alexander Ludwig von Brevern was born on 16 January [O.S. 5] 1814, his father was Heinirch Johann von Brevern auf Kostifer and his mother was Countess Maria De la Gardie. He came from the Kostifer-Isaak branch of the Baltic German Brevern family (de), the Breverns were of Thuringian origin, originating in Eisleben. They were originated from Johannes Brever (Breuer), a German councillor in Frankenstein (in present-day Ząbkowice Śląskie, Poland). And his great-grandson Johannes Brever (Breverus) (1621-1700) was the main ancestor of the Livonian line of the family, moving from Saxony to Riga in Swedish Livonia in 1643. One of the most significant member and founder of the family, Johannes' son Hermann (1663-1721) was a jurist working in the Riga castle court and the Livonian high court. He was granted Swedish noble title von Brevern in 1694. He then entered Russian service after the Annexation of Livonia by the Russians, he became vice-president of the Collegium of Justice shortly afterwards. Hermann's descendants then spread out and settle around the Russian Baltics.

Pontus belonged to the Estonian line of the family, which was founded by his grandfather Heinrich Johann von Brevern (1749-1803), who was married to Anna Elizabeth Staël von Holstein.

==== De la Gardie ====
The De la Gardies was originally d'Escouperie, the family was of French nobility. According to genealogist Gustaf Elgenstierna, the First ancestor of the family was Robert d'Escouperie who lived in France during the late-14th Century. While some argued that Robert's supposed grandson Jacques Scoperier was the oldest ancestor. Jacques’ son Ponce was a soldier, who defected to the Swedes upon being captured at Varberg (sv) by the Swedes. Upon defection he changed his name to Pontus De la Gardie. The family was most famous in Sweden for producing a number of prominent statesmen like Jacob and Magnus De la Gardie.

==== Brevern-de la Gardie ====
During the mid-19th Century, due to the absences of the male line. Pontus was chosen by his uncle Karl Magnus De la Gardie to inherit the surname and title of De la Gardie, thus creating the joint family of Brevern-de la Gardie.

=== Family ===
In 1854 Brevern-de la Gardie married Maria Alexandrovna Voeykova, the daughter of Alexander Voeykov. They had 5 children together. He had two sons Nikolai (1856-1929) and Woldemar (1862-1864), was a chamberlain and diplomat, resident-minister in the Grand Duchy of Baden, he was married to Anna Ulshakova, the daughter of Senator Sergei Ushakov. Woldemar didn't survived through childhood. His other children included three daughters Maria (1857-1915), Katherina (1859-1920) and Olga (1861-1882). Both Maria and Katherina were courtiers, and the latter was a philanthropist. While Olga died early on in her life.

== Honours and awards ==
=== Domestic ===
- Order of St. Stanislaus, 3rd class (1841)
- Order of St. Anna, 2nd class (1848)
- Order of St. Stanislaus, 1st class (1857)
- Order of St. Anna, 1st class (1859)
- Order of St. Vladimir, 2nd class (1862)
- Order of the White Eagle (1867)
- Order of St. Alexander Nevsky with diamonds signs (1881, diamond signs in 1883)
- Order of St. Vladimir, 1st class (1887)

=== Foreign ===
- Kingdom of Prussia:
  - Order of the Red Eagle, 3rd class (1839)
  - Order of St. John with diamonds (1852)
- Principality of Montenegro:
  - Order of Prince Danilo I, 1st class (1883)
- Principality of Bulgaria:
  - Order of St. Alexander (1884)

== Sources ==
- Genealogical Handbook of the Baltic Knighthoods Part 2, 3: Estonia. Görlitz (1929)
- Klingspor, Carl Arvid. Baltic heraldic coat of arms all, belonging to the knighthoods of Livonia, Estonia, Courland and Oesel noble families. Stockholm (1882)
- Welding, Olaf. Baltic German Biographical Dictionary 1710-1960. (1970), from the Baltic Biographical Dictionary Digital
- De la Gardie nr 4

Military offices
| Preceded by Sigizmund Merkhilevich | Commander of the Kharkov Military District; 6 January [O.S. 25 December 1864] 1865 – 30 August [O.S. 18] 1869 | Succeeded by Alexander Kartsov |
| Preceded by Alexander von Güldenstubbe | Commander of the Moscow Military District; 17 April [O.S. 5] 1879 – 30 August [O.S. 18] 1888 | Succeeded by Apostol Kostanda |
