= 1st Grenadier Division (Russian Empire) =

- 1-я гренадерская дивизия
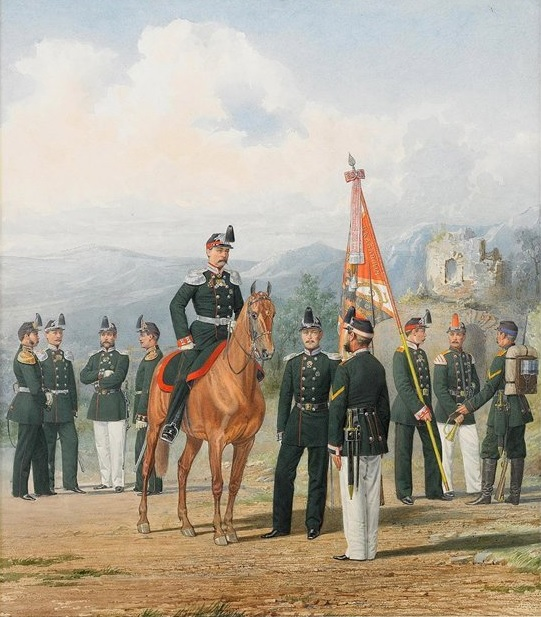
- Active: 1806–1918
- Country: Russian Empire
- Branch: Imperial Russian Army
- Type: Grenadier
- Part of: Grenadier Corps

The 1st Grenadier Division was a grenadier unit in the Imperial Russian Army. It was headquartered at Moscow and participated in the Baranovichi Offensive.

== Organization ==
- 1st Brigade
- 2nd Brigade
- Artillery Brigade

== Commanders ==
- 1854–1855: Alexander Gildenshtubbe
- 1875–1878: Christopher Roop
- 1891–1898: Vodar

== Chiefs of Staff ==
- 1891–1895: Alexander G Sandetsky
- 1902–1904: Pantalejmon Simanski
- 1915–1917: Vladimir Yegoryev

== Commanders of the 1st Brigade ==
- 1845–1848: Alexander Gildenshtubbe
- 1913–1914: Johannes Holmsen

== Commanders of the 2nd Brigade ==
- 1831–1832: Mikhail Grigoryevich Brajko
- 1878–1881: Mikhail Batyanov
- 1890–1894: Grigory Vasilyevich Kryukov
- 1905: Vladimir Gorbatovsky

== Commanders of the Artillery Brigade ==
- 1907–1908: Nikolai Ilyich Bulatov
