= Kobyakovo =

Kobyakovo Кобяково
- Village
- Location within Vologda Oblast Location within Russia
- Coordinates: 58°47′N 39°57′E
- Country: Russia
- Region: Vologda Oblast
- District: Gryazovetsky District
- Time zone: UTC+3:00

Kobyakovo (Russian: Кобяково) is a rural locality (a village) in Yurovskoye Rural Settlement, Gryazovetsky District, Vologda Oblast, Russia. The population was 31 as of 2002.

== Geography ==
Kobyakovo is located 27 km (17 mi) southwest of Gryazovets (the district's administrative centre) by road. Vozdvizhenskoye is the nearest rural locality.
