= 448th Rocket Brigade =

- Sleeve patch of the 448th Rocket Brigade
- Active: 1987–Present
- Country: Soviet Union (1987–1992); Russia (1992–present)
- Branch: Soviet Army (1987–1992); Russian Ground Forces (1992–present)
- Type: Tactical ballistic missile unit
- Part of: 20th Guards Combined Army
- Garrison/HQ: Kursk
- Patron: S.P. Nepobedimy
- Equipment: OTR-21 Tochka; 9K720 Iskander
- Engagements: Russo-Ukrainian War: Russian Invasion of Ukraine; 2024 Kursk offensive

Commanders
- Current commander: Colonel Dmitri Nikolaevich Martynov

The 448th Rocket Brigade named for S.P. Nepobedimy is a tactical ballistic missile brigade of the Russian Ground Forces. Based in Kursk, the brigade is part of the 20th Guards Army.

== History ==
The brigade was formed in September 1987 at Born in East Germany. It was composed of the 639th, 650th and 697th Separate Rocket Battalions, as well as a technical battery. The 639th and 650th Battalions were based at Born and the 697th Battalion was based at Schönebeck. The 639th had been transferred from the 10th Guards Tank Division, the 650th from the 12th Guards Tank Division and the 697th from the 7th Guards Tank Division. The brigade was subordinated to the 3rd Red Banner Army. It was equipped with the OTR-21 Tochka tactical ballistic missile. In December 1990, the brigade moved to Kursk and became part of the 20th Guards Combined Army.

The OTR-21 Tochka missiles of the brigade are planned to be replaced with 9K720 Iskander missiles. On 2 August 2021, the brigade was named for Tochka missile designer Sergey Nepobedimy.

The brigade is reportedly taking part in the Russian invasion of Ukraine.
