= Kaarma =

Village in Estonia

Coordinates: 58°20′47″N 22°33′26″E

- Village
- Interactive map of Kaarma
- Country: Estonia
- County: Saare County
- Parish: Saaremaa Parish
- Time zone: UTC+2 (EET)
  - Summer (DST): UTC+3 (EEST)

Kaarma (German: Karmel) is a village in Saaremaa Parish, Saare County, on the island of Saaremaa, Estonia. The Estonian communist politician Viktor Kingissepp was born here in 1888.

Before the administrative reform in 2017, the village was in Lääne-Saare Parish.
