= Durnevo =

Durnevo Дурнево
- Village
- Location within Vologda Oblast Location within Russia
- Coordinates: 59°33′N 39°25′E
- Country: Russia
- Region: Vologda Oblast
- District: Vologodsky District
- Time zone: UTC+3:00

Durnevo (Russian: Дурнево) is a rural locality (a village) in Novlenskoye Rural Settlement, Vologodsky District, Vologda Oblast, Russia. The population was 3 as of 2002.

== Geography ==
Durnevo is located 50 km northwest of Vologda (the district's administrative centre) by road. Ostretsovo is the nearest rural locality.
