= The Other I =

Studio album by 2:54
- Released: 11 November 2014
- Length: 50:33
- Label: Bella Union

2:54 chronology
2:54 (2012)	The Other I (2014)

Professional ratings
Aggregate scores
Source	Rating
Metacritic	69/100
Review scores
Source	Rating
Allmusic	3.5/5 stars
Clash	6/10
Consequence of Sound	C+
DIY	3/5 stars
Loud and Quiet	6/10
musicOMH	3.5/5 stars
NME	7/10
Nothing But Hope And Passion	3.8/5
Pitchfork Media	5.3/10
Popmatters	8/10

The Other I is a studio album by English duo 2:54. It was released in November 2014 under Bella Union.

== Track listing ==
No.	Title	Length
1.	"Orion"	4:39
2.	"Blindfold"	4:31
3.	"In the Mirror"	4:16
4.	"No Better Prize"	4:52
5.	"Sleepwalker"	4:03
6.	"Tender Shoots"	1:49
7.	"The Monaco"	4:16
8.	"Crest"	3:45
9.	"Pyro"	4:25
10.	"South"	4:54
11.	"Glory Days"	4:03
12.	"Raptor"	5:00
