= Pushing Electric =

Studio album by The Standstills
- Released: November 28, 2012
- Genre: Rock Blues Alternative
- Length: 41:15
- Label: Self-Released
- Producer: Jonny Fox Renée Couture

The Standstills chronology
The Human Element (2011)	Pushing Electric (2012)	From The Devil's Porch (2015)

Pushing Electric is an album by Oshawa, Ontario duo The Standstills. It was released on November 28, 2012 and is the band's second full-length record. This album was self-produced by the band and was recorded in a home studio with the help of assistant engineer Damien Jacobs. This album was mixed once again by JUNO Award winner Dan Brodbeck, who handled the mixing duties for their previous two releases. There has been two music videos released from this album for the tracks "Good God Damn" and "Jesus" both directed by Dave Cardoso.

This album is dedicated to Nikola Tesla.

== Track listing ==
No.	Title	Length
1.	"Pushing Electric"	4:04
2.	"Good God Damn"	2:29
3.	"Junkie"	2:46
4.	"Jealous One"	3:54
5.	"Dance"	2:43
6.	"Jesus"	3:13
7.	"The Wolf"	2:53
8.	"One In A Million"	5:10
9.	"Pyro"	3:54
10.	"Arcadia"	5:13
11.	"Gone"	4:56
Total length:		41:15
