= The Standstills =

Canadian rock duo

- Origin: London, Ontario, Canada
- Genres: Rock
- Years active: 2011–present
- Labels: MNRK
- Members: Jonny Fox; Renée Couture
- Website: thestandstills.com

The Standstills are a Canadian rock duo from Oshawa, Ontario.

== History ==
=== Pushing Electric (2012–2013) ===
In 2012, the band entered 97.7 CHTZ-FM's Rocksearch, as suggested by fans, alongside 140+ bands. They performed live and won the competition by 12 unanimous industry judges' decision- which had never been done in the event's 26-year history. This allowed them to be included in the winner's circle alongside The Trews, My Darkest Days, and Finger Eleven. Later that year the duo independently recorded, produced and engineered an independent full-length album Pushing Electric out of home in a temporary basement studio. The album is said to be dedicated to Nikola Tesla with a track on the album called "Jesus" paying homage to his nickname, The Electric Jesus.

=== From the Devil's Porch, eOne Music Canada and LP 3 (2015–present) ===
On June 23, 2015, the band released a new single titled "Orleans" on their website off their upcoming EP From the Devil's Porch. The band announced the new EP would be released on August 21, 2015, through Entertainment One Music. Their debut single "Orleans" was the first they serviced to Canadian radio and kept them in the top ten for eighteen weeks peaking at No. 4 on the Canadian rock radio charts. They released the official music video for "Orleans" on November 27, 2015, directed by Saint of Footage Worldwide Productions. iTunes listed From the Devil's Porch as one of their best rock albums of 2015 and "Orleans" was featured on Fido's innovative 360 commercial in November 2015; the video has since then garnered over 3 million views. In December 2015, Spotify listed The Standstills on their 2016 Canadian spotlight playlist. The Winnipeg Free Press reviewer rated From the Devil's Porch four stars (out of five) and called it "a very loud and powerful experience". Kerry Doole of New Canadian Music noted the duo's "sonic fury".

=== Badlands (2018) ===
No.	Title	Length
1.	"Wild"	2:56
2.	"Butcher"	3:10
3.	"Shaker Down"	3:05
4.	"Whiskey And Mead"	3:17
5.	"Living Too Fast"	2:41
6.	"Cold Blooded Killer"	3:11
7.	"Black Hill Creek"	3:19
8.	"Diablo"	3:08
9.	"Red Skies"	5:06
10.	"Liquor Store"	3:11
Total length:		32:48

== Band members ==
Current

- Jonny Fox – guitar, vocals (2008–present)
- Renée Couture – drums (2008–present)
- Brendan Mcmillan – bass, vocals (2022–present)

== Discography ==
Studio albums

- Badlands (2018)
- Shockwave (2022)

Extended plays

- From the Devil's Porch (2015)

== Videography ==
Title	Year	Director	Album
"Orleans"	2015	Saint Chris	From the Devil's Porch
