= Pyra, Russia =

Pyra Пыра
- Urban-type settlement
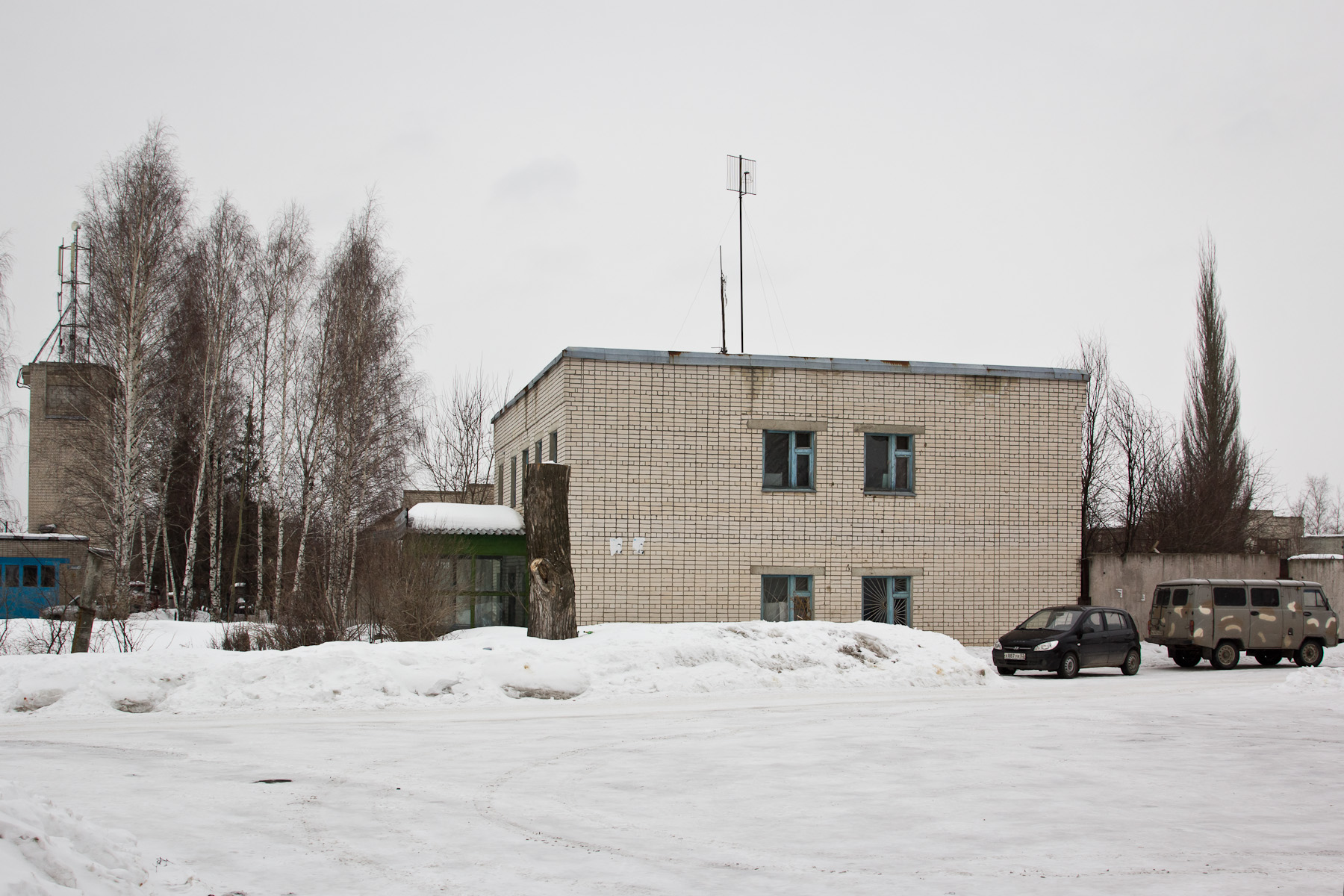
- Interactive map of Pyra
- Location of Pyra Pyra (Nizhny Novgorod Oblast)
- Coordinates: 56°19′N 43°22′E
- Country: Russia
- Federal subject: Nizhny Novgorod Oblast
- Founded: 1951
- Elevation: 102 m (335 ft)

Population
  - Estimate (2010): 1,938 )
- Time zone: UTC+3 (MSK)
- Postal code: 606055
- OKTMO ID: 22721000141

Pyra (Russian: Пы́ра) is an urban-type settlement in Nizhny Novgorod Oblast, Russia, located 35 km west of Nizhny Novgorod. Administratively, it is under the jurisdiction of the city of Dzerzhinsk. Population: 2,025 (2002 census); 2,313 (1989 Soviet census).
