= Eleventh =

Eleventh or 11th may refer to:

- The ordinal form of the number eleven
- A fraction, 1/11, equal to one of 11 equal parts
- Eleventh of the month, a recurring calendar date
- Eleventh grade, in education
- Eleventh (interval)

== Geography ==
- 11th meridian east, a line of longitude
- 11th meridian west, a line of longitude
- 11th parallel north, a circle of latitude
- 11th parallel south, a circle of latitude
- Eleventh Avenue (disambiguation)
- 11th Street (disambiguation)

== Military ==
- 11th Armored (disambiguation)
- Eleventh Army (disambiguation)
- 11th Battalion (disambiguation)
- 11th Brigade (disambiguation)
- 11th Division (disambiguation)
- 11th Group (disambiguation)
- 11th Regiment (disambiguation)
- 11th Squadron (disambiguation)

== Other ==
- Eleventh Amendment (disambiguation)
  - Eleventh Amendment to the United States Constitution
- Eleventh Doctor in Doctor Who media
- The 11th, experimental podcast aired from 2022 to 2023
- The Eleventh, 1996 studio album by industrial metal band Rorschach Test
- United States Court of Appeals for the Eleventh Circuit
- 11th century
- 11th century BC

== See also ==
- 11 (disambiguation)
- 11th cabinet (disambiguation)
- 11th Congress (disambiguation)
- 11th dimension (disambiguation)
- The Eleventh Hour (disambiguation)
- The Eleventh Commandment (disambiguation)
