= 11th Cavalry =

11th Cavalry may refer to:

== Corps ==
- 11th Cavalry Corps (Soviet Union)

== Divisions ==
- 11th Armoured Cavalry Division, Poland
- 11th Cavalry Division (Russian Empire)

== Brigades ==
- 11th Cavalry Brigade (British Indian Army)
- 11th Indian Cavalry Brigade

== Regiments ==
- 11th Armored Cavalry Regiment, United States
- 11th Cavalry (Frontier Force), Pakistan
- 11th Hussars, United Kingdom
- 11th Hussars (Canada)
- 11th Hussar Regiment (France)
- 11th Illinois Cavalry Regiment, United States
- 11th Indiana Cavalry Regiment, United States
- 11th Kansas Cavalry Regiment, United States
- 11th Kentucky Cavalry Regiment, United States
- 11th King Edward's Own Lancers (Probyn's Horse), British India
- 11th Michigan Cavalry Regiment, United States
- 11th (Ashcraft's) Mississippi Cavalry Regiment, Confederate States
- 11th (Perrin's) Mississippi Cavalry Regiment, Confederate States
- 11th Ohio Cavalry Regiment, United States
- 11th Pennsylvania Cavalry Regiment, United States
- 11th Tennessee Cavalry Regiment, United States
- 11th Texas Cavalry Regiment, Confederate States
- 11th Virginia Cavalry Regiment, Confederate States
- 11th (Hampshire and Berkshire) Yeomanry Cyclist Regiment
- 2nd Westphalian Hussar Regiment, No. 11, German Empire

== Other uses ==
- Georgia Eleventh Cavalry football

== See also ==
- 11th Brigade (disambiguation)
- 11th Corps (disambiguation)
- 11th Division (disambiguation)
- 11th Regiment (disambiguation)
- 11th (disambiguation)
