= 11 Squadron =

11 Squadron or 11th Squadron may refer to:

== Aviation squadrons ==
- No. 11 Squadron IAF a unit of Indian Air Force
- No. 11 Squadron (Finland), a unit of the Finnish Air Force
- No. 11 Squadron PAF, a unit of Pakistan Air Force
- No. 11 Squadron RAAF, a unit of the Royal Australian Air Force
- No. 11 Squadron RAF, a unit of the United Kingdom Royal Air Force
- No. 11 Squadron RCAF, a unit of the Royal Canadian Air Force
- No. 11 Squadron RJAF, a unit of the Royal Jordanian Air Force
- 11 Squadron SAAF, a unit of the South African Air Force
- 11th Squadron (Belgium), a unit of the Belgian Air Component
- 11 Squadron (Qatar), a unit of the Qatar Emiri Air Force
- 11th Aero Squadron, a unit of the United States Army Air Service
- 11th Air Squadron (Indonesia), a unit of the Indonesian Air Force
- 11th Air Squadron (Japan), a unit of the Imperial Japanese Army Air Service
- 11th Airlift Squadron, a unit of the United States Air Force
- 11th Air Refueling Squadron, a unit of the United States Air Force
- 11th Air Support Operations Squadron, a unit of the United States Air Force
- 11th Attack Squadron, a unit of the United States Air Force
- 11th Bomb Squadron, a unit of the United States Air Force
- 11th Operational Weather Squadron, a unit of the United States Air Force
- 11th Reconnaissance Squadron (disambiguation), units of the United States Air Force
- 11th Space Warning Squadron, a unit of the United States Space Force
- 11th Special Operations Intelligence Squadron, a unit of the United States Air Force
- 11th Troop Carrier Squadron, a unit of the United States Air Force
- VFA-11 (Strike Fighter Squadron 11), a unit of the United States Navy
- Marine Aviation Logistics Squadron 11, a unit of the United States Marine Corps

== Naval squadrons ==
- 11th Aircraft Carrier Squadron, a unit of the Royal Navy
- 11th Mine Countermeasures Squadron, a unit of the Royal Navy
- Destroyer Squadron 11, a formation of the United States Navy
- Submarine Squadron 11, a formation of the United States Navy

== See also ==
- 11th Army (disambiguation)
- XI Corps (disambiguation)
- 11th Battalion (disambiguation)
- 11th Brigade (disambiguation)
- 11th Division (disambiguation)
- 11th Group (disambiguation)
- 11th Regiment (disambiguation)
- 11th Wing
