= 11th Infantry =

11th Infantry may refer to:

- 11th Infantry Division (disambiguation)
- 11th Infantry Brigade (disambiguation)
- 11th Infantry Regiment (disambiguation)

== See also ==
- 11th (disambiguation)
