= 11th Battalion =

11th Battalion may refer to:

- 11th Battalion (Australia), a unit of the Australian Army
- 2/11th Australian Infantry Battalion, a unit of the Australian Army
- 11th/28th Battalion, Royal Western Australia Regiment, a unit of the Australian Army
- 11th Philippine Scout Battalion, a unit of the Philippine Army
- 11th Battalion Ulster Defence Regiment, a unit of the British Army
- Czechoslovak 11th Infantry Battalion, a unit of the Czechoslovak army in exile during World War II
- 11th Separate Motorized Infantry Battalion (Ukraine), a unit of the Ukrainian Armed Forces

== See also ==
- 11th Army (disambiguation)
- XI Corps (disambiguation)
- 11th Division (disambiguation)
- 11th Group (disambiguation)
- 11th Brigade (disambiguation)
- 11th Regiment (disambiguation)
- 11 Squadron (disambiguation)
