= 11th Group =

11th Group may refer to:

- Eleventh Army Group (United Kingdom), a formation of the United Kingdom Army
- 11th Carrier Air Group, a formation of the Royal Navy

== See also ==
- 11th Army (disambiguation)
- XI Corps (disambiguation)
- 11th Division (disambiguation)
- 11th Brigade (disambiguation)
- 11th Regiment (disambiguation)
- 11 Squadron (disambiguation)
