= XI Corps =

11 Corps, 11th Corps, Eleventh Corps, or XI Corps may refer to:

== France ==
- 11th Army Corps (France)
- XI Corps (Grande Armée), a unit of the Imperial French Army during the Napoleonic Wars

== Germany ==
=== German Empire ===
- XI Corps (German Empire), Imperial German Army

=== Nazi Germany ===
- 11th Air Corps, Luftwaffe, Wehrmacht
- XI Army Corps (Wehrmacht)
- XI SS Panzer Corps, Waffen-SS

== Russia and Soviet Union ==
- 11th Army Corps (Russian Empire)
- 11th Army Corps (Russian Federation)

=== Soviet Union ===
- 11th Cavalry Corps
- 11th Guards Tank Corps
- 11th Mechanized Corps
- 11th Rifle Corps
- 11th Tank Corps

== United Kingdom ==
- XI Corps (United Kingdom), a unit of the British Army

=== Artillery Volunteer Corps ===
- 11th (Tarbert) Argyllshire Artillery Volunteer Corps
- 11th (St Ives) Cornwall Artillery Volunteer Corps
- 11th (Brixham) Devonshire Artillery Volunteer Corps
- 11th (Kinghorn) Fife Artillery Volunteer Corps
- 11th (Maryhill Artisans) Lanarkshire Artillery Volunteer Corps

=== Rifle Volunteer Corps ===
- 11th (Matlock) Derbyshire Rifle Volunteer Corps
- 11th (Bampton) Devonshire Rifle Volunteer Corps
- 11th (Dursley) Gloucestershire Rifle Volunteer Corps
- 11th (Glasgow 2nd Western) Lanarkshire Rifle Volunteer Corps
- 11th (1st Preston) Lancashire Rifle Volunteer Corps
- 11th (Alford) Lincolnshire Rifle Volunteer Corps
- 11th Middlesex Rifle Volunteer Corps (Railway Rifles)
- 11th (Worthing) Sussex Rifle Volunteer Corps
- 11th (East Metropolitan) Tower Hamlets Rifle Volunteer Corps
- 11th (Pocklington) Yorkshire (East Riding) Rifle Volunteer Corps
- 11th (Leeds Rifles) Yorkshire West Riding Rifle Volunteer Corps

== United States ==
- XI Corps (United States), United States Army
- XI Corps (Union Army), American Civil War

== Other countries ==
- 11th Corps (People's Republic of China)
- XI Corps (India)
- XI Army Corps (Italy)
- XI Corps (North Korea)
- XI Corps (Ottoman Empire)
- XI Corps (Pakistan)
- XI Army Corps (Spain)
- 11th Army Corps (Ukraine)

== See also ==
- List of military corps by number
- 11th Army (disambiguation)
- 11th Division (disambiguation)
- 11th Brigade (disambiguation)
- 11th Regiment (disambiguation)
- 11th Battalion (disambiguation)
- 11th Squadron (disambiguation)
- 11th (disambiguation)
