= Royal B. Allison =

American lieutenant general

Royal Bertram Allison
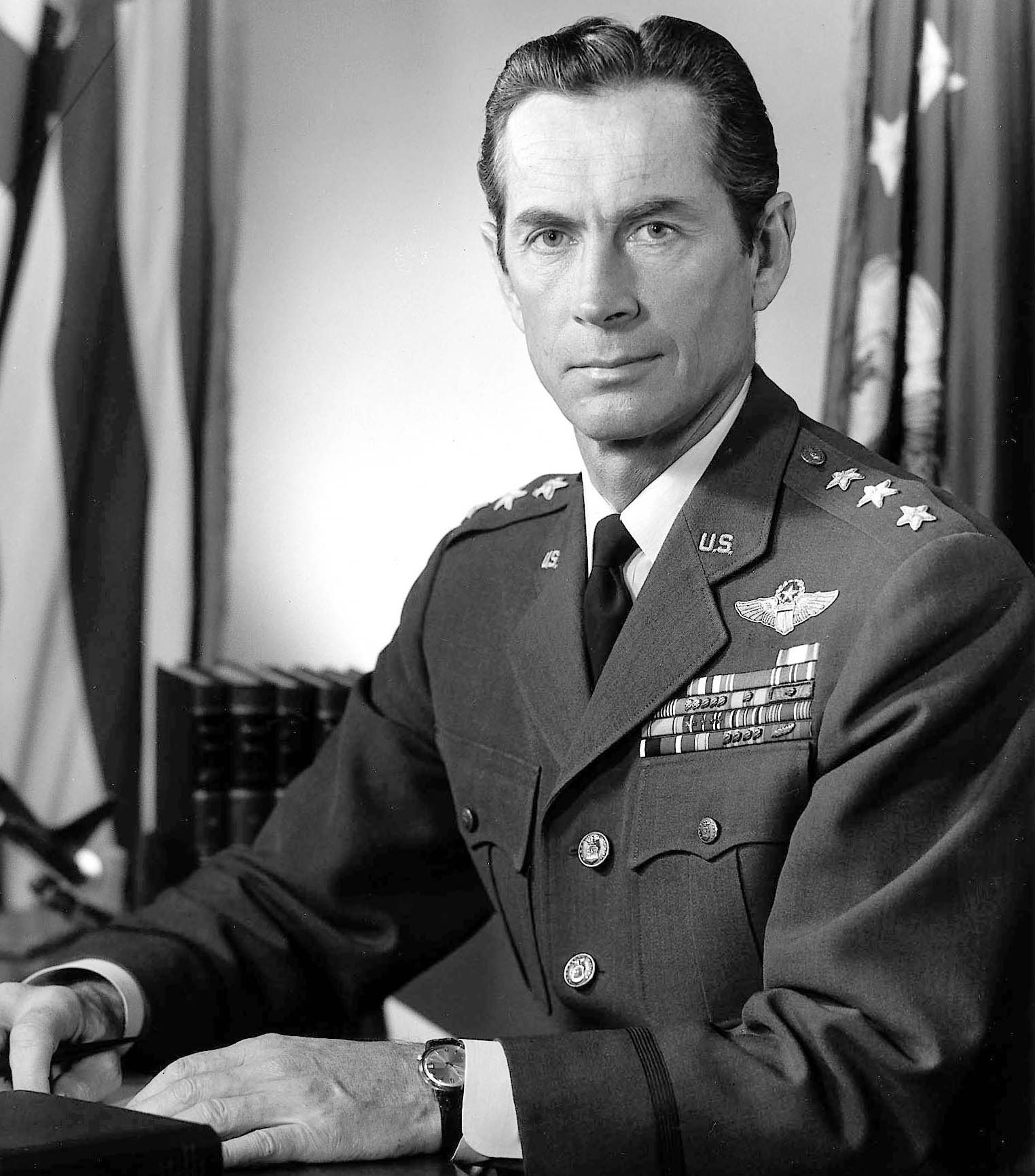
- Born: April 22, 1919; Harlan, Oregon, U.S.
- Died: October 31, 1995 (aged 76); Bethesda, Maryland, U.S.
- Burial place: Arlington National Cemetery
- Military career
- Allegiance: United States
- Branch: United States Air Force
- Service years: 1941–1973
- Rank: Lieutenant General
- Unit: 310th Bombardment Group
- Commands: 11th Reconnaissance Squadron; 3615th Flying Training Group
- Conflicts: World War II
- Awards: Air Force Distinguished Service Medal (2); Silver Star; Legion of Merit; Distinguished Flying Cross; Soldier's Medal; Air Medal (14)

Royal Bertram Allison (April 22, 1919 – October 31, 1995) was a United States Air Force lieutenant general and a bomber pilot during World War II. He later served as the principal military adviser on U.S. government's Strategic Arms Limitation Talks negotiating team.

== Early life ==
Allison was born in Harlan, Oregon, in 1919. He graduated from high school in Portland, Oregon, and studied civil engineering at Oregon State College.

== Military career ==
He entered the U.S. Army Air Corps in July 1941 and received his pilot wings and commission as a second lieutenant at the Air Corps Advanced Flying School at Stockton Field in California, in February 1942.

After graduation from pilot training, he was assigned as a flying instructor at the Air Corps Advanced Flying School in Turner Field in Albany, Georgia. In December 1942 he was assigned to Columbia Army Air Base in South Carolina, for tactical and combat training in the North American B-25 Mitchell bomber aircraft.

=== World War II ===
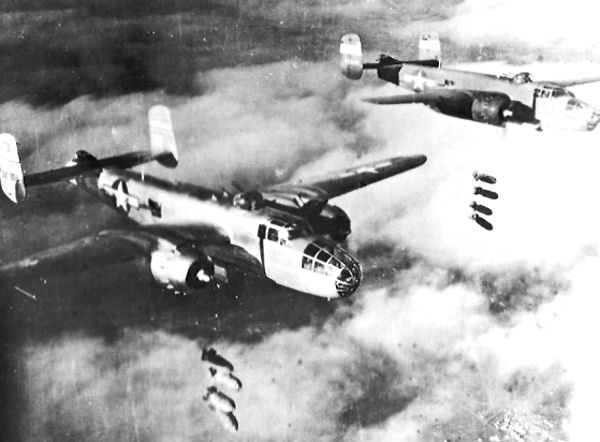
B-25Js of the 310th Bombardment Group over northern Italy, 1944.

In April 1943, he was assigned to the 310th Bombardment Group of the Twelfth Air Force in North Africa. Allison received the Silver Star for action he participated on March 10, 1945, where he led a thirty-plane formation in a successful attack upon a railroad bridge at Ora, Italy which led to blocking a vital link in enemy communication lines, despite accurate enemy anti-aircraft fire.

During the war, he flew over flew 90 combat missions in the B-25 and participated in the Mediterranean Theater of Operations campaigns in Sicily, Sardinia, Italy, Corsica and Southern France. He also received the Distinguished Flying Cross, Soldier's Medal and Air Medal with 13 oak leaf clusters. He remained with the 310th BG until the end of World War II.

=== Post war ===
In July 1945, he returned to the United States from Italy and was assigned as a student to the Command and General Staff School at Fort Leavenworth in Kansas. Upon completion of school, he was assigned to March Field in California, where he served as commander of the 11th Reconnaissance Squadron and as deputy assistant chief of staff, A-3, for Twelfth Air Force.

Allison was ordered to Headquarters U.S. Air Force in the Pentagon for duty in the Directorate of Plans and Operations in July 1948. He was transferred to Headquarters U.S. Air Forces in Europe in the fall of 1950 and served in various staff positions in the Directorate of Plans and as a member of a team of officers which negotiated for United States air bases in Morocco. In August 1952 he was assigned as chief of the Policy Branch, J-3 Division, Headquarters U.S. European Command.

In October 1954, he returned to the United States for duty as assistant deputy chief of staff of personnel of Air Training Command at Scott Air Force Base in Illinois. A year and a half later, he was assigned as commander of the 3615th Flying Training Group at Craig Air Force Base in Alabama, which had a mission of training flying instructors in jet aircraft and providing transition training for pilots from conventional to jet aircraft. Subsequently, he served as executive officer of the 3615th Flying Training Wing at Craig Air Force Base.

In 1958, he was ordered to Headquarters U.S. Air Force for duty as assistant for National Security Council affairs, Deputy Chief of Staff, Plans and Programs. In June 1959, he was assigned to duty as executive officer to chief of staff of the United States Air Force General Thomas D. White, and served in that capacity until General White's retirement in June 1961.

He was again assigned to Headquarters U.S. Air Forces in Europe as director of plans, in July 1961, and after serving in that position for two years, he became assistant deputy chief of staff for operations. In August 1964, he became deputy chairman for the chairman of the Joint Chiefs of Staff's Special Studies Group, in Washington, D.C. The Special Studies Group conducts detailed analyses and conceptual studies for the Joint Chiefs of Staff on strategic offensive and defensive forces, general purpose tactical forces, tactical nuclear forces and on other specified subjects.

In June 1967 he assumed the duties of deputy chief of staff for plans and operations for commander in chief, Pacific in Hawaii. In July 1968, he was assigned additional duties as assistant to the chairman of the Joint Chiefs of Staff, for Strategic Arms Negotiations, and in July 1969 he returned to the United States to assume these duties with the chairman of the Joint Chiefs of Staff, on a full-time basis. He also had additional duties as principal military adviser on U.S. Government's Strategic Arms Limitation Talks negotiating team with the Soviet Union. He served in this position until his retirement from the Air Force on June 1, 1973.

== Later life ==
Allison married Liliane Doulcaris (1921-2009) on January 28, 1945. The couple had a son named Michael, and several grand and great-grandchildren.

After retirement from the Air Force, Allison resided in Washington, D.C., where he was a consultant to an airline and an oil company, and at the same time developed his own business interests. In the final eight years of his life, he lived in Palm Beach, Florida.

Allison died on October 31, 1995, at Walter Reed Army Hospital in Bethesda, Maryland, at the age of 76, due to cancer. He was buried at Arlington National Cemetery.

== Awards and decorations ==
His awards include:

USAF command pilot badge
Air Force Distinguished Service Medal with bronze oak leaf cluster
Silver Star
Legion of Merit
Distinguished Flying Cross
Soldier's Medal
Air Medal with two silver and two bronze oak leaf clusters
Air Medal (second ribbon required for accoutrement spacing)
Air Force Commendation Medal with bronze oak leaf cluster
Air Force Presidential Unit Citation with bronze oak leaf cluster
American Defense Service Medal
American Campaign Medal
European-African-Middle Eastern Campaign Medal with one silver and three bronze campaign stars
European-African-Middle Eastern Campaign Medal (second ribbon required for accoutrement spacing)
World War II Victory Medal
Army of Occupation Medal with 'Germany' clasp
National Defense Service Medal with service star
Air Force Longevity Service Award with silver and bronze oak leaf clusters
Small Arms Expert Marksmanship Ribbon
French Croix de Guerre with Palm
