= Eleventh Army =

Eleventh Army or 11th Army may refer to:

== Germany ==
- 11th Army (German Empire), a World War I field Army
- 11th Army (Wehrmacht), a World War II field army
- 11th SS Panzer Army

== Russia/Soviet Union ==
- 11th Army (Russian Empire)
- 11th Army (RSFSR)
- 11th Army (Soviet Union)
- 11th Air and Air Defence Forces Army
- 11th Guards Army

== Others ==
- 11th Army (Austria-Hungary)
- 11th Army (Italy)
- Eleventh Army (Japan)
- Eleventh Area Army, Japan

== See also ==
- List of armies by number
- XI Corps (disambiguation)
- 11th Division (disambiguation)
- 11th Brigade (disambiguation)
- 11th Regiment (disambiguation)
- 11th Battalion (disambiguation)
- 11th Squadron (disambiguation)
- 11th Group (disambiguation)
- 11th (disambiguation)
