= 11th Mississippi Cavalry Regiment =

11th Mississippi Cavalry Regiment may refer to:

- 11th (Ashcraft's) Mississippi Cavalry Regiment, formerly 3d (Ashcraft's) Mississippi Cavalry Battalion
- 11th (Perrin's) Mississippi Cavalry Regiment, formerly Perrin's Mississippi Cavalry Battalion
