= 11th Division =

11th Division or 11th Infantry Division may refer to:

== Infantry divisions ==
- 11th Division (Australia)
- 11th Infantry Division (Bangladesh)
- 11th Infantry Division (Belgium)
- 11th Macedonian Infantry Division, Bulgaria
- 11th Division (National Revolutionary Army)
- 11th Garrison Division of Shenyang Military Region, People's Republic of China
- 11th Motorized Infantry Division, People's Republic of China
- 11th Division (German Empire)
- 11th Landwehr Division, German Empire
- 11th Reserve Division, German Empire
- 11th Bavarian Infantry Division, a unit of the Royal Bavarian Army, part of the Imperial German Army, in World War I
- 11th Panzergrenadier Division (Bundeswehr)
- 11th SS Volunteer Panzergrenadier Division Nordland
- 11th Infantry Division (Wehrmacht)
- 11th Luftwaffe Field Division, Wehrmacht
- 11th Marine Division, Wehrmacht
- 11th Infantry Division (Greece)
- 11th Indian Division, a unit of the British Indian Army during World War I
- 11th Infantry Division (India)
- 11th Division (Iraq)
- 11th Infantry Division "Brennero", Kingdom of Italy
- 11th Division (Imperial Japanese Army)
- 11th Infantry Division (Pakistan)
- 11th Division (Philippines), Philippines Commonwealth Army, World War II
- 11th Infantry Division (Philippines)
- 11th Infantry Division (Poland)
- 11th Infantry Division (Russian Empire)
- 11th Siberian Rifle Division, Russian Empire
- 11th Maneuver Division, South Korea
- 11th Guards Mechanised Division, Soviet Union
- 11th Guards Rifle Division, Soviet Union
- 11th Rifle Division (Soviet Union)
- 11th Division (Spain)
- 11th Division (Sri Lanka)
- 11th Infantry Division (Thailand), see Apirat Kongsompong
- 11th Motor Rifle Division "Sultan Sanjar", Turkmenistan
- 11th (African) Division, United Kingdom
- 11th (East Africa) Division, a colonial unit of the British Empire during World War II
- 11th (Northern) Division, a unit of the British Army during World War I
- 11th Infantry Division (United States), a unit in World War I and World War II
- 11th Division (Yugoslav Partisans)

== Airborne divisions ==
- 11th Parachute Division, Germany
- 11th Guards Airborne Division, Soviet Union
- 11th Airborne Division, United States

== Armored and cavalry divisions ==
- 11th Panzer Division (Wehrmacht), Germany
- 11th Armoured Cavalry Division, Poland
- 11th Cavalry Division (Russian Empire)
- 11th Guards Tank Division, Soviet Union
- 11th Tank Division (Soviet Union)
- 11th Armoured Division (United Kingdom)
- 11th Armored Division (United States)
- 11th Armored Division (Syria)

== Aviation divisions ==
- 11th Guards Fighter Aviation Division, Soviet Union
- 11th Air Division, a unit of the United States Air Force in Alaska
- 11th Aviation Fighter Division, Yugoslav Partisans

== Air defense divisions ==
- 11th Flak Division, Wehrmacht
- 11th Anti-Aircraft Division, United Kingdom
- 11th Air Defense Division, Yugoslavia

== Other divisions ==
- 11th Public Security Division, People's Republic of China
- 11th Strategic Division, Malaysia

== See also ==
- 11th Army (disambiguation)
- XI Corps (disambiguation)
- 11th Group (disambiguation)
- 11th Brigade (disambiguation)
- 11th Regiment (disambiguation)
- 11th Battalion (disambiguation)
- 11 Squadron (disambiguation)
