= 11th Congress =

11th Congress may refer to:

- 11th Congress of the Philippines (1998–2001)
- 11th Congress of the Russian Communist Party (Bolsheviks) (1922)
- 11th National Congress of the Chinese Communist Party (1977)
- 11th National Congress of the Communist Party of Vietnam (2011)
- 11th National Congress of the Kuomintang (1976)
- 11th National Congress of the Lao People's Revolutionary Party (2021)
- 11th National People's Congress (2008–2013)
- 11th United States Congress (1809–1811)
