= 9th Tennessee Cavalry Regiment =

- Active: August 25, 1863, to September 11, 1865
- Country: United States
- Allegiance: Union
- Branch: Cavalry
- Engagements: Battle of the Cumberland Gap (1863); Battle of Morristown; Battle of Bull's Gap; Battle of Marion; Second Battle of Saltville; Stoneman's 1865 Raid

The 9th Tennessee Cavalry Regiment was a cavalry regiment that served in the Union Army during the American Civil War.

== Service ==
The 9th Tennessee Cavalry was organized August 25, 1863, in Knoxville, Tennessee and mustered in for a three-year enlistment under the command of Colonel Joseph H. Parsons. The 11th Tennessee Cavalry was consolidated into the regiment on March 24, 1865.

The regiment was attached to District of North Central Kentucky, Department of the Ohio, to April 1864. 3rd Brigade, 4th Division, Cavalry Corps, Army of the Cumberland, to October 1864. 3rd Brigade, 4th Division, Cavalry Corps, Military Division Mississippi, to November 1864. District of East Tennessee, Department of the Cumberland, to March 1865. 3rd Brigade, Cavalry Division, District of East Tennessee, to July 1865. Cavalry Brigade, District of East Tennessee, to September 1865.

The 9th Tennessee Cavalry mustered out of service September 11, 1865, at Knoxville, Tennessee.

== Detailed service ==
Joined Col. John F. DeCourcy at Crab Orchard, Ky., September 24, 1863. Duty at Crab Orchard, Ky., until October 1863. (A detachment on march to Cumberland Gap September 24-October 3, 1863, and operations about there.) Duty in District of East Tennessee, at Knoxville, Nashville, and on line of the Nashville & Chattanooga Railroad, and at Bull's Gap, Tenn., until October 1864. Rogersville August 21, 1864. Pursuit to Greenville August 21–23. Blue Springs August 23. Operations in eastern Tennessee August 29-September 4. Park Gap and Greenville September 4. Death of Gen. J. H. Morgan. Gillem's Expedition from eastern Tennessee toward southwest Virginia September 20-October 17. Rheatown September 28. Watauga River September 29. Carter's Station September 29-October 1. Operations in eastern Tennessee October 10–28. Greenville October 12. Bull's Gap October 16. Clinch Mountain October 18. Clinch Valley, near Sneedsville, October 21. Mossy Creek and Panther Gap October 27. Morristown and Russellville October 28. Operations against Breckenridge's advance into eastern Tennessee November 4–17. Russellville November 11. Bull's Gap November 11–14. Russellville November 14. Strawberry Plains November 16–17. Flat Creek November 17. Stoneman's Expedition to Saltville, Va., December 10–29. Big Spring, near Rogersville, December 12. Kingsport December 13. Glade Springs December 15. Marion and capture of Wytheville December 16. Mt. Airy December 17. Engagement near Marion December 17–18. Capture and destruction of Saltville December 20–21. Duty in eastern Tennessee until March 1865. Stoneman's Raid into southwest Virginia and western North Carolina March 21-April 25. Wytheville April 6. Shallow Ford and near Mocksville, N.C., April 11. Salisbury April 12. Catawba River April 17. Swannanoa Gap, N.C., April 20. Near Hendersonville April 23. Duty in eastern Tennessee until September.

== Commanders ==
- Colonel Joseph H. Parsons

== See also ==
- List of Tennessee Civil War units
- Tennessee in the Civil War
