= 11th Marine Division =

German naval infantry division during World War II (1945)

- German: 11. Marine-Infanterie-Division
- Active: March–April 1945
- Country: Nazi Germany
- Branch: Kriegsmarine
- Type: Marine
- Role: Amphibious warfare
- Size: Division (never reached full strength) Likely a Marine Kampfgruppe (Battle group)
- Headquarters: Breda

The 11th Marine Division (German: 11. Marine-Infanterie-Division) was an infantry formation of the German Kriegsmarine under the control of the German Heer during the Second World War.

== History ==
The 11th Marine Division was formed in the Reichskommissariat Niederlande (Netherlands) in March 1945 from troops of the Kommandierender Admiral in den Niederlanden (Commanding Admiral in the Netherlands). On formation, the division was attached to Army Corps Detachment Diestel, part of the 25th Army. However, the division was never properly formed and as of 12 April was still badly organised. For that reason it was disbanded and its infantry battalions were handed over to army units.

== Organisation ==
The divisional organisation was as follows:

- Divisional Headquarters – Formerly 2nd Ships Cadre Regiment at Beverloo Camp
- 111th Marine Rifle Regiment – Formerly 14th Ships Cadre Battalion at Breda
- 112th Marine Rifle Regiment – Formerly 16th Ships Cadre Battalion at Bergen op Zoom
- 113th Marine Rifle Regiment – Formerly 20th Ships Cadre Battalion at Ede
- 11th Marine Divisional Troops

== Commanders ==
The only commander of the division was Naval Captain Hans Ahlmann.
