= 11th Infantry Brigade =

11th Infantry Brigade may refer to:

- 11th Canadian Infantry Brigade
- 11th Indian Infantry Brigade
- 11th Infantry Brigade (Australia)
- 11th Infantry Brigade (Hungary)
- 11th Infantry Brigade (United Kingdom)
- 11th Infantry Brigade (United States)

== See also ==
- 11th Brigade (disambiguation)
