= Beverloo Camp Railway =

Coordinates: 51.12237°N 5.26509°E

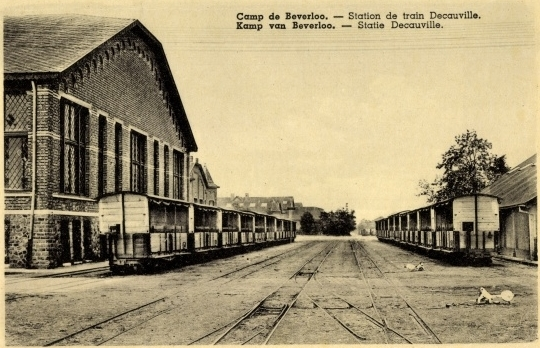
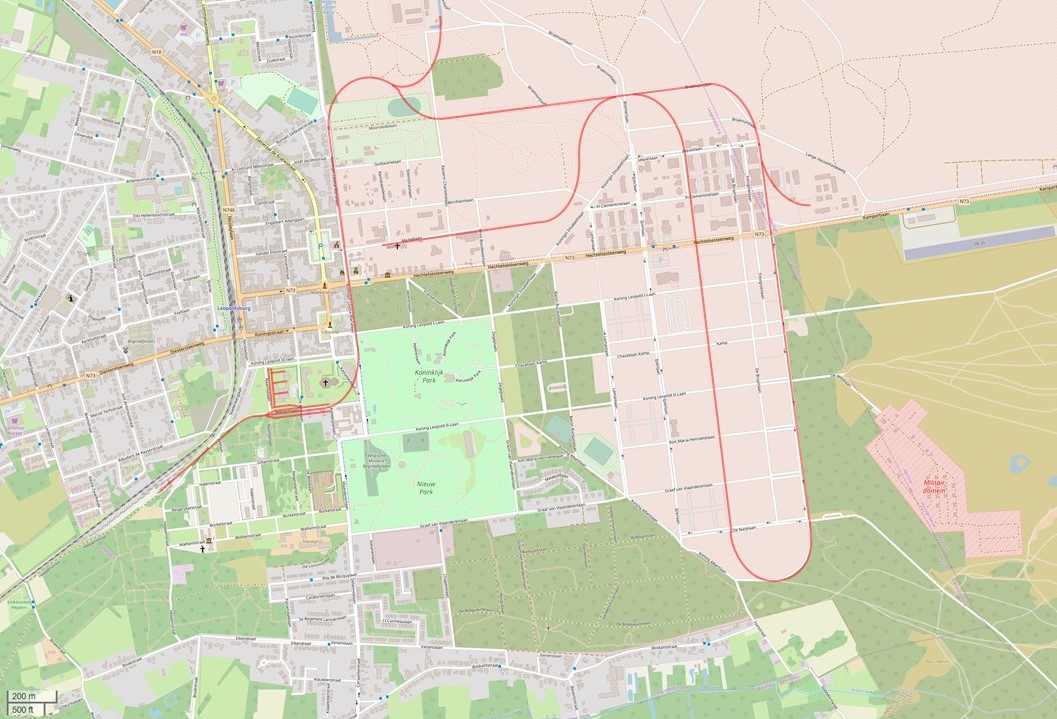
- Decauville railway station at Beverloo Camp, 1920s Route of the main line, as shown on a 1970s map

Technical
- Line length: 115 km (71 mi)
- Track gauge: 600 mm (1 ft 11 5/8 in)

The Beverloo Camp Railway was a 115 km (71 mi) long 600 mm (1 ft 11 5/8 in) gauge railway line in Beverloo Camp near Leopoldsburg in Belgium, which was operated from 1879 to 1940.

== History ==
The first section of track was laid in 1879 by Paul Decauville. It was extended to Leopoldsburg Station, on the standard gauge railway, in 1914.

The track was lifted on 10 May 1940 by Lieutenant Jeunehomme of the 3rd Compagnie and his troops, because of the German invasion during World War II.

== Route ==
The network was in total 115 km long including all the tracks throughout old Beverloo Camp. They went to the barracks, but also to the buildings outside the Infantry or Cavalry Barracks (military bakery, military butchery, military hospital etc) and to the firing range, which was located several kilometers away from the barracks.

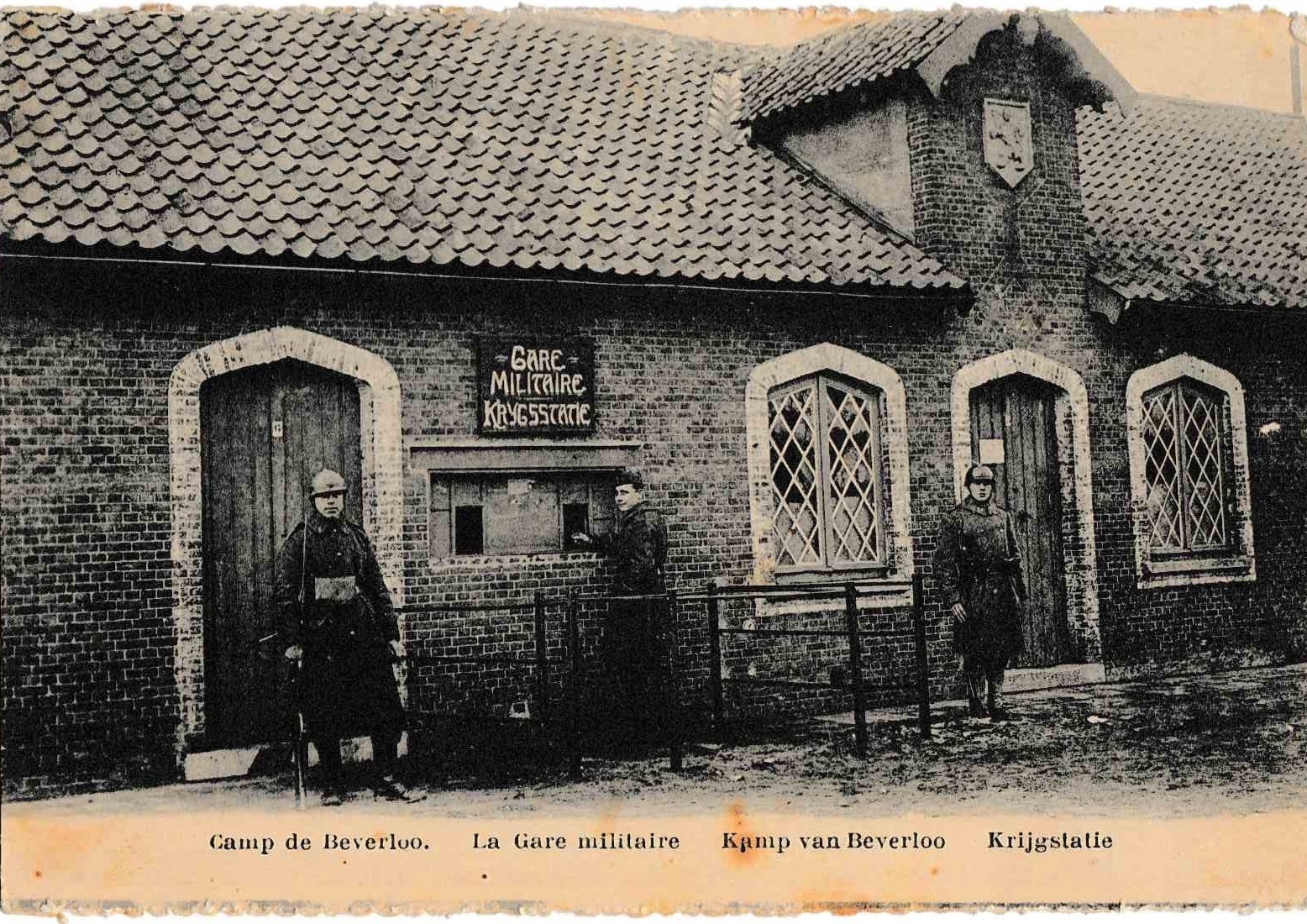
Military railway station

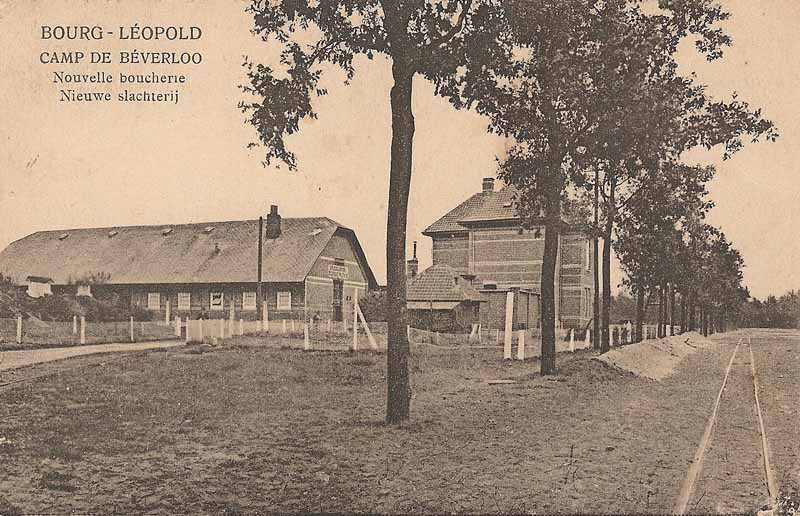
Military butchery

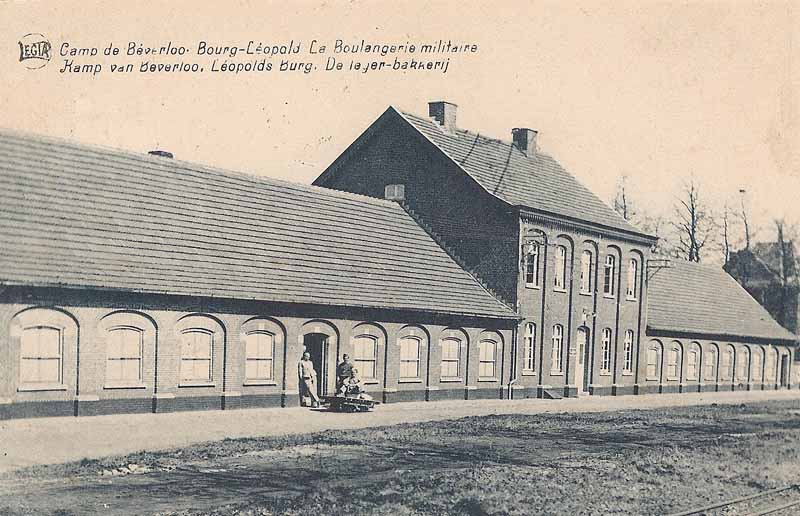
Military bakery

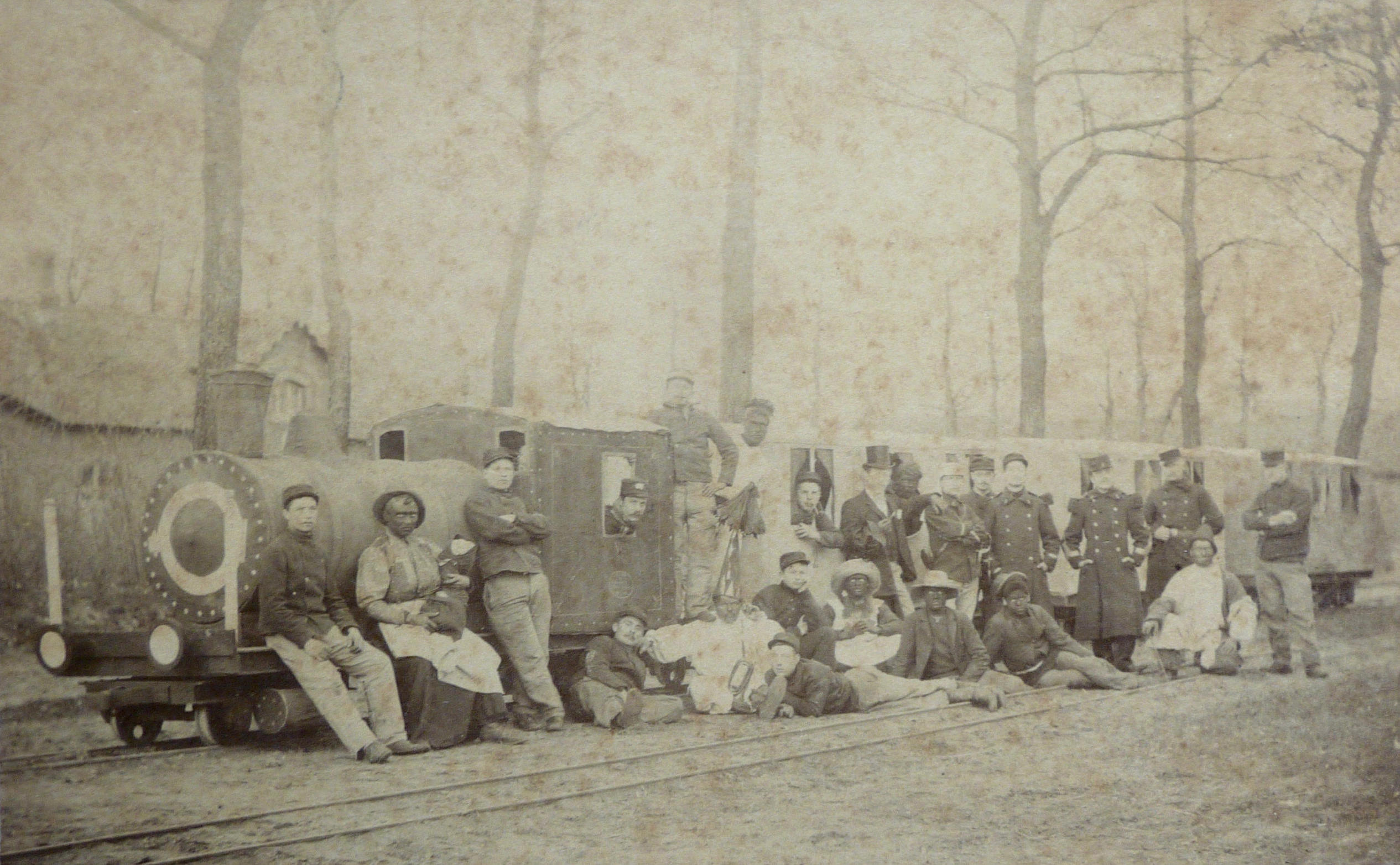
Actors and soldiers with a mock-up train, 1899

== Rolling stock ==
=== Carriages ===
Initially horse-drawn, eight-wheeled Decauville bogie carriages were used.

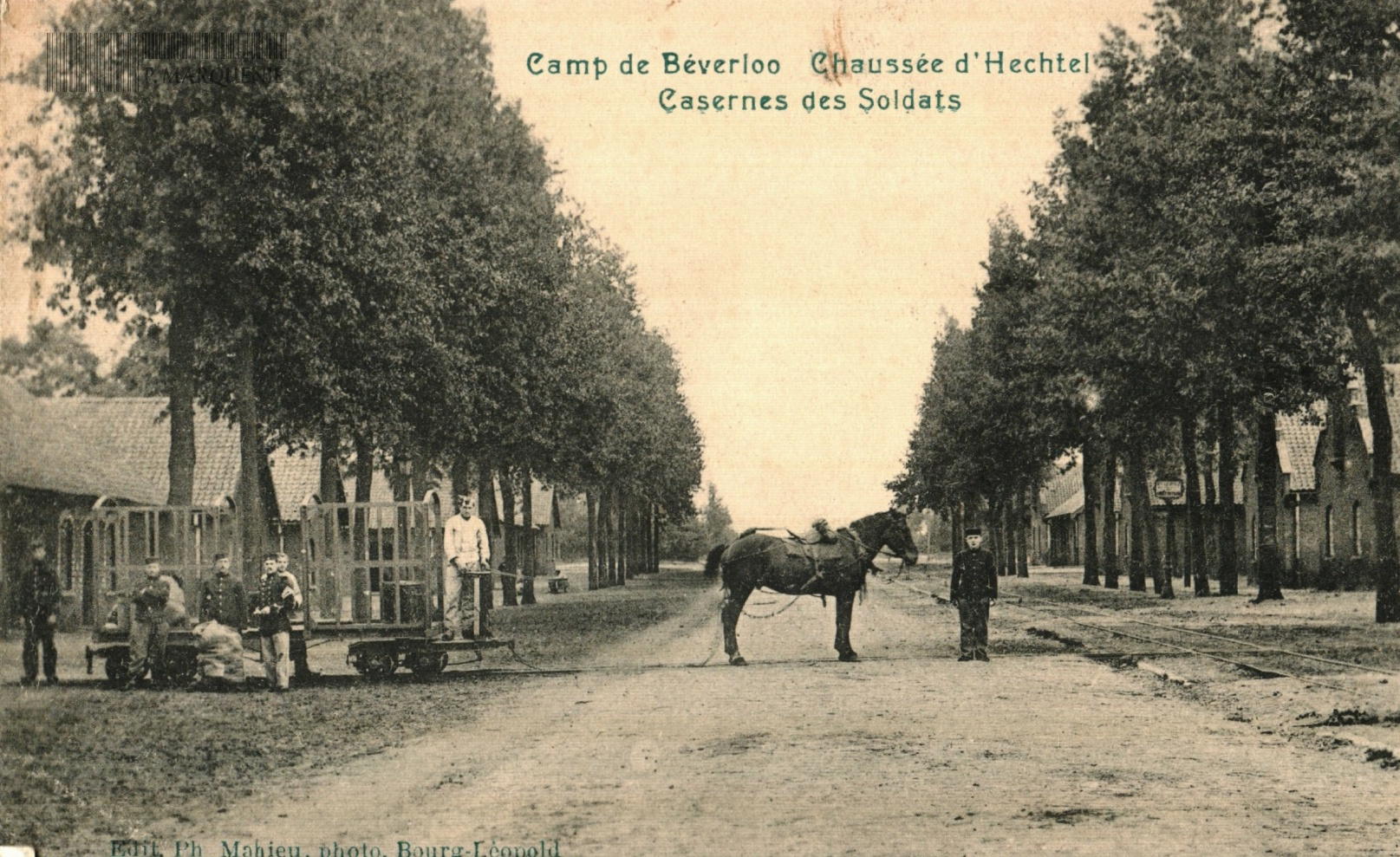
Barracks

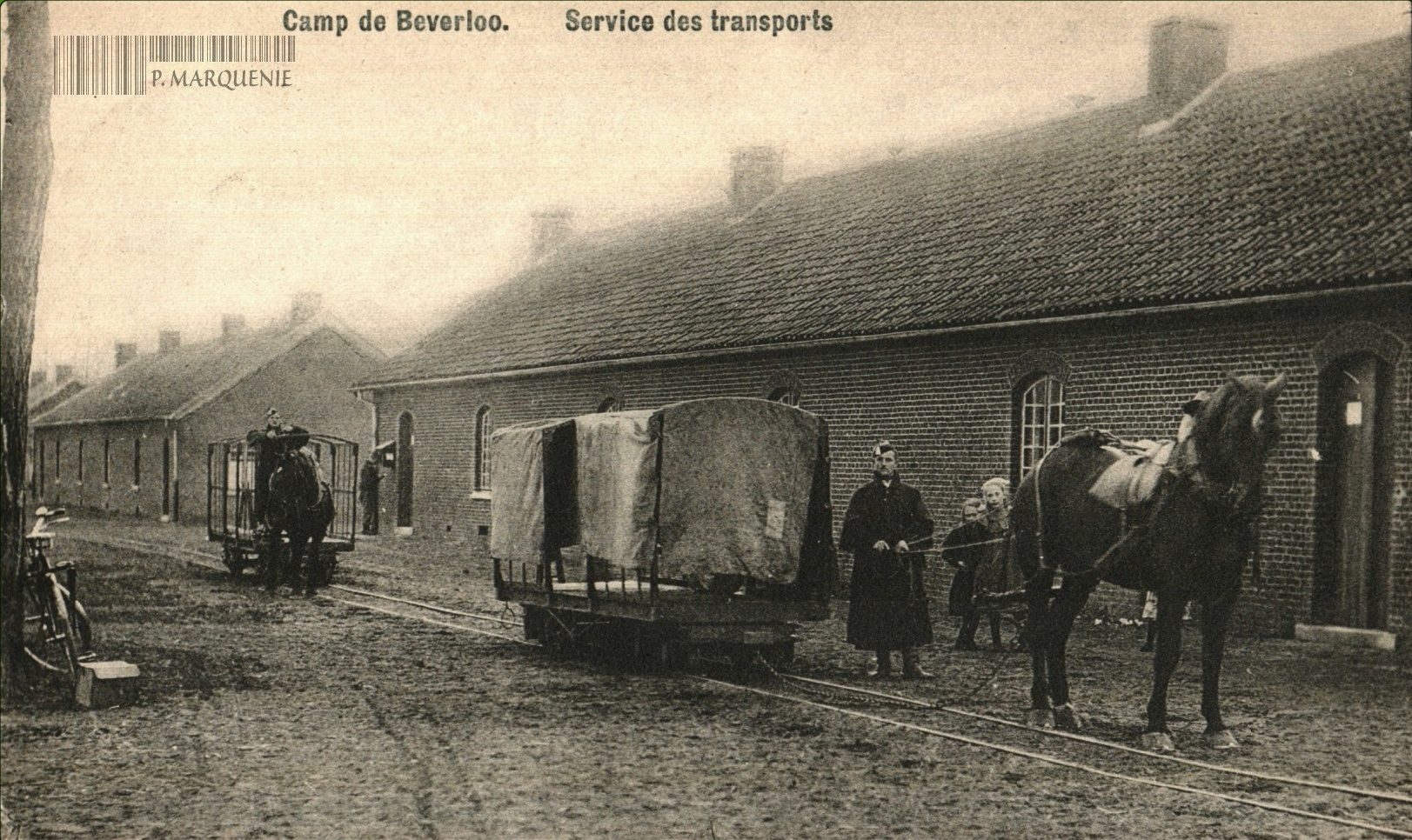
Transport services

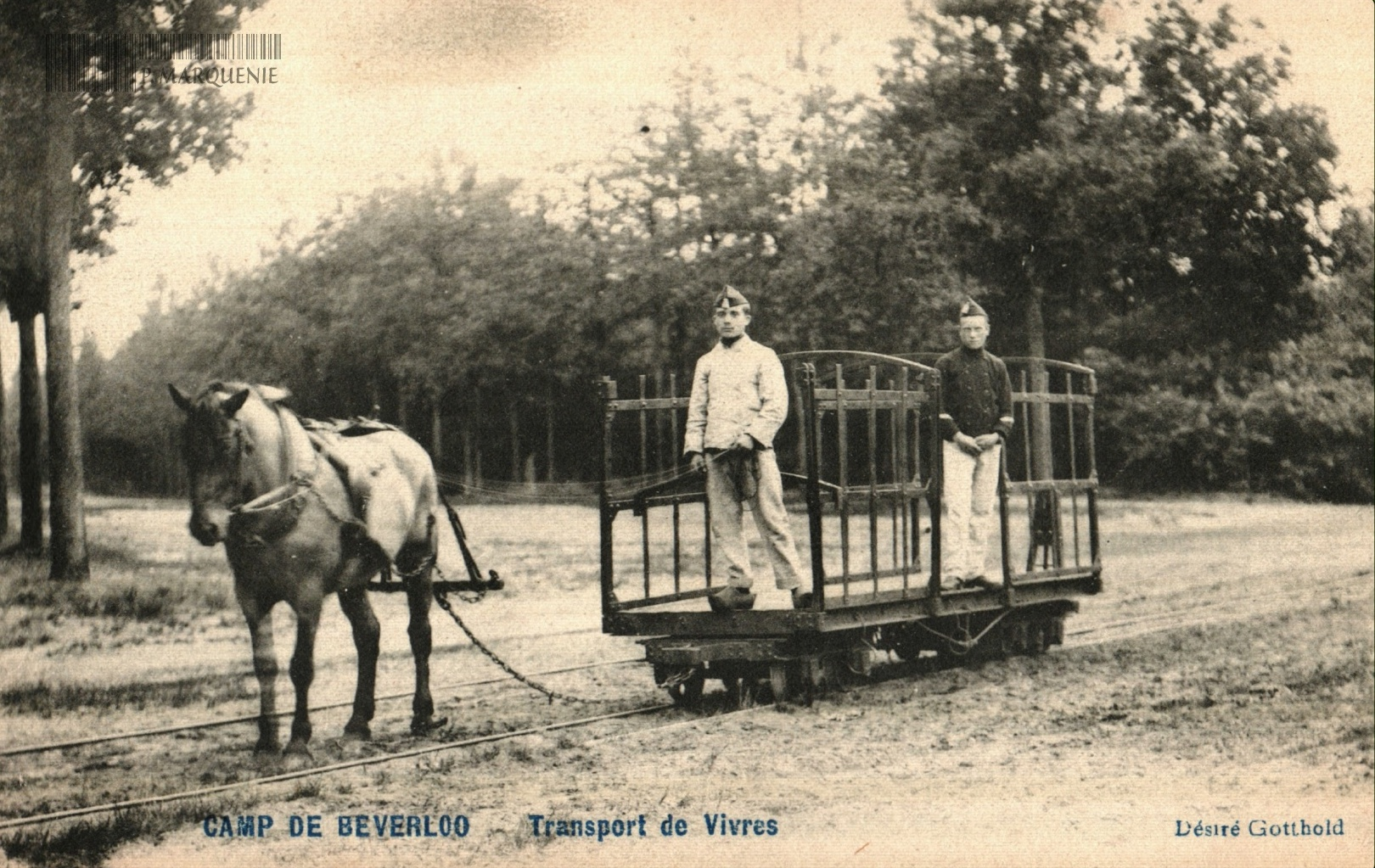
Food transport

=== Steam locomotives ===
Later Borsig steam locomotives were used:

Name	Type	Manufacturer	Operator	Image
Anna	0-4-4-0	Borsig	RCF	
Cecile	0-4-4-0	Borsig	RCF	
Henriette	0-4-4-0	Borsig	RCF	
	0-4-4-0	Borsig		

== Troup transport ==
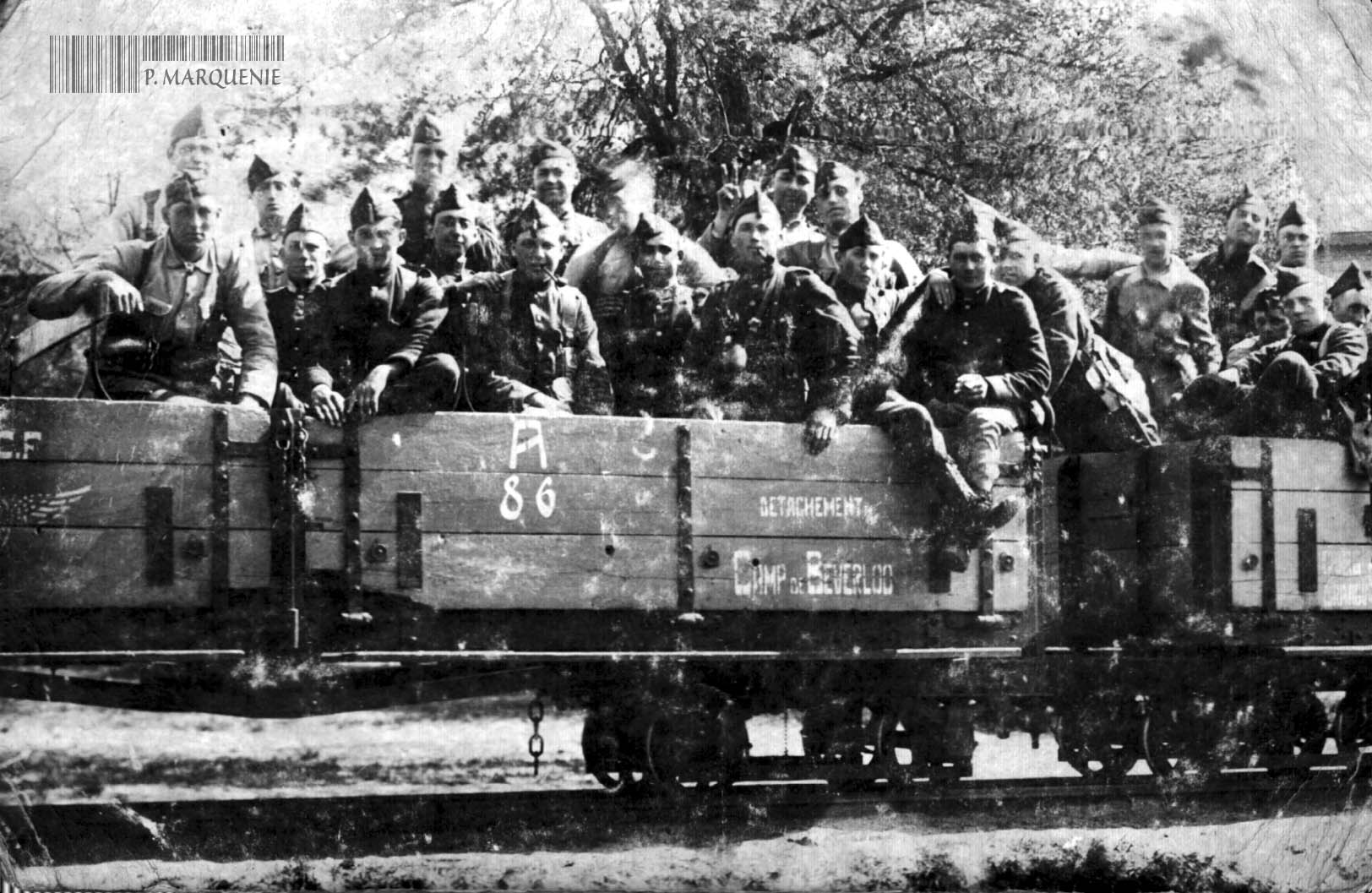
Troup transport

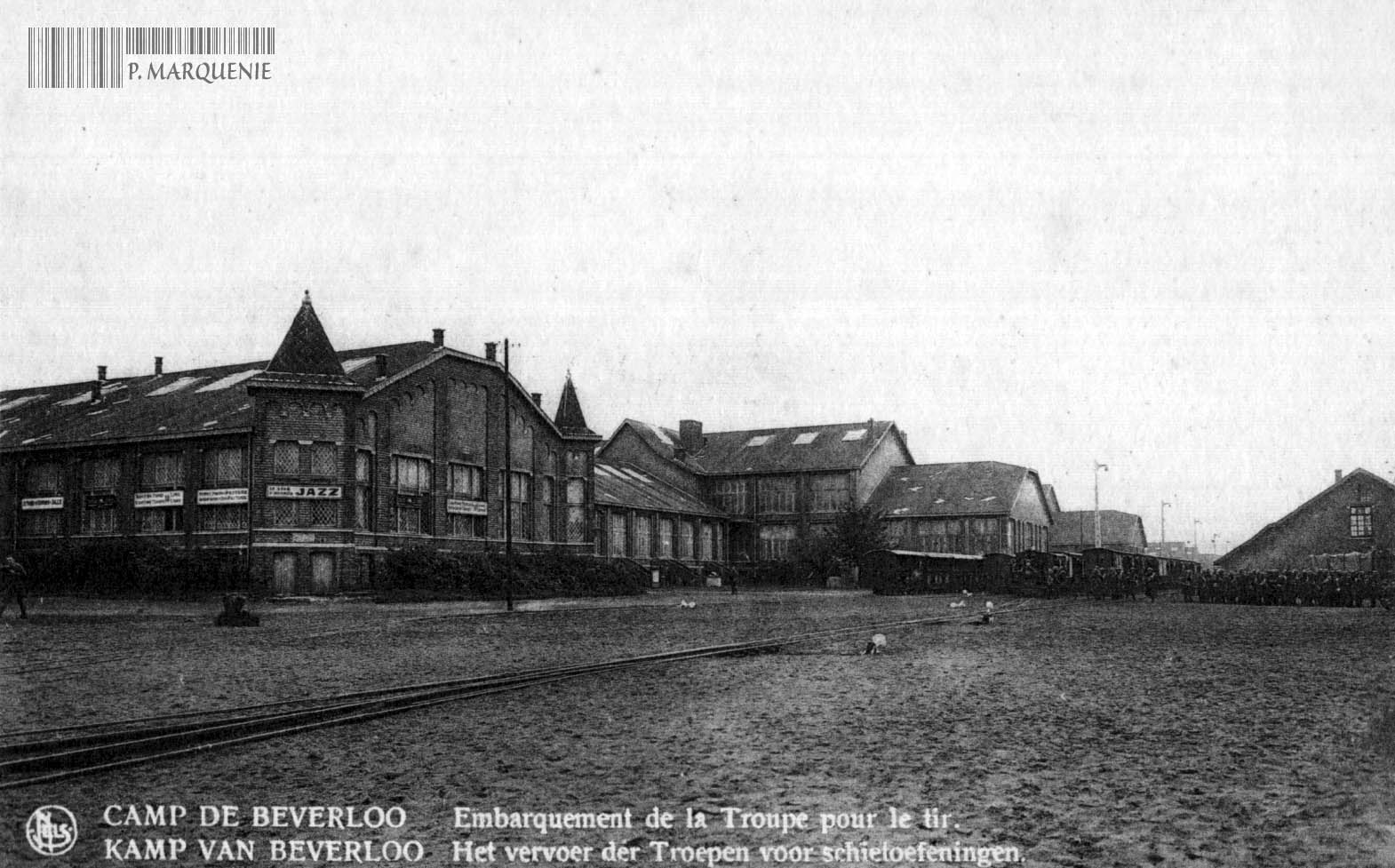
Embarkment of the troops

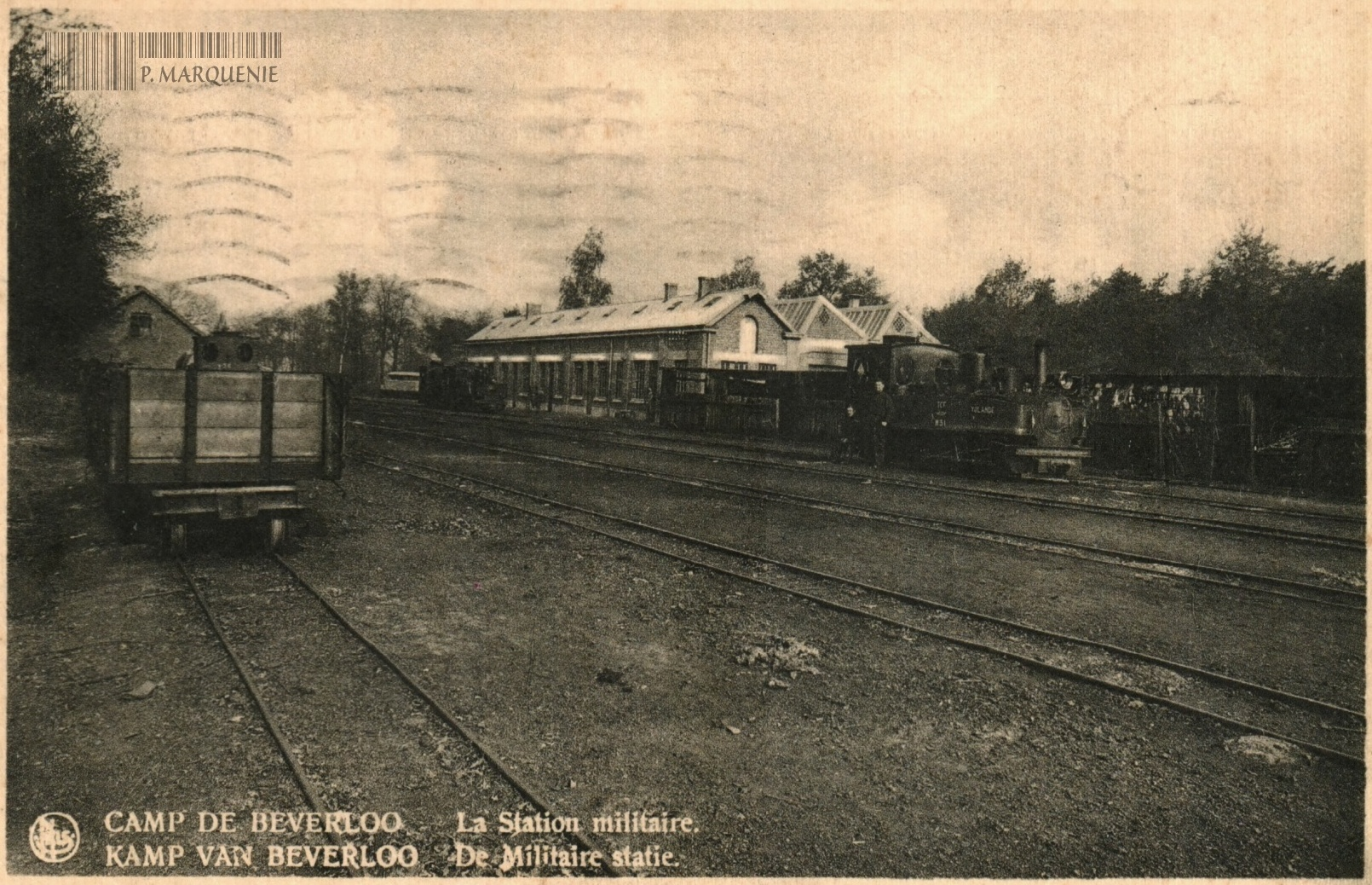
Military railway station

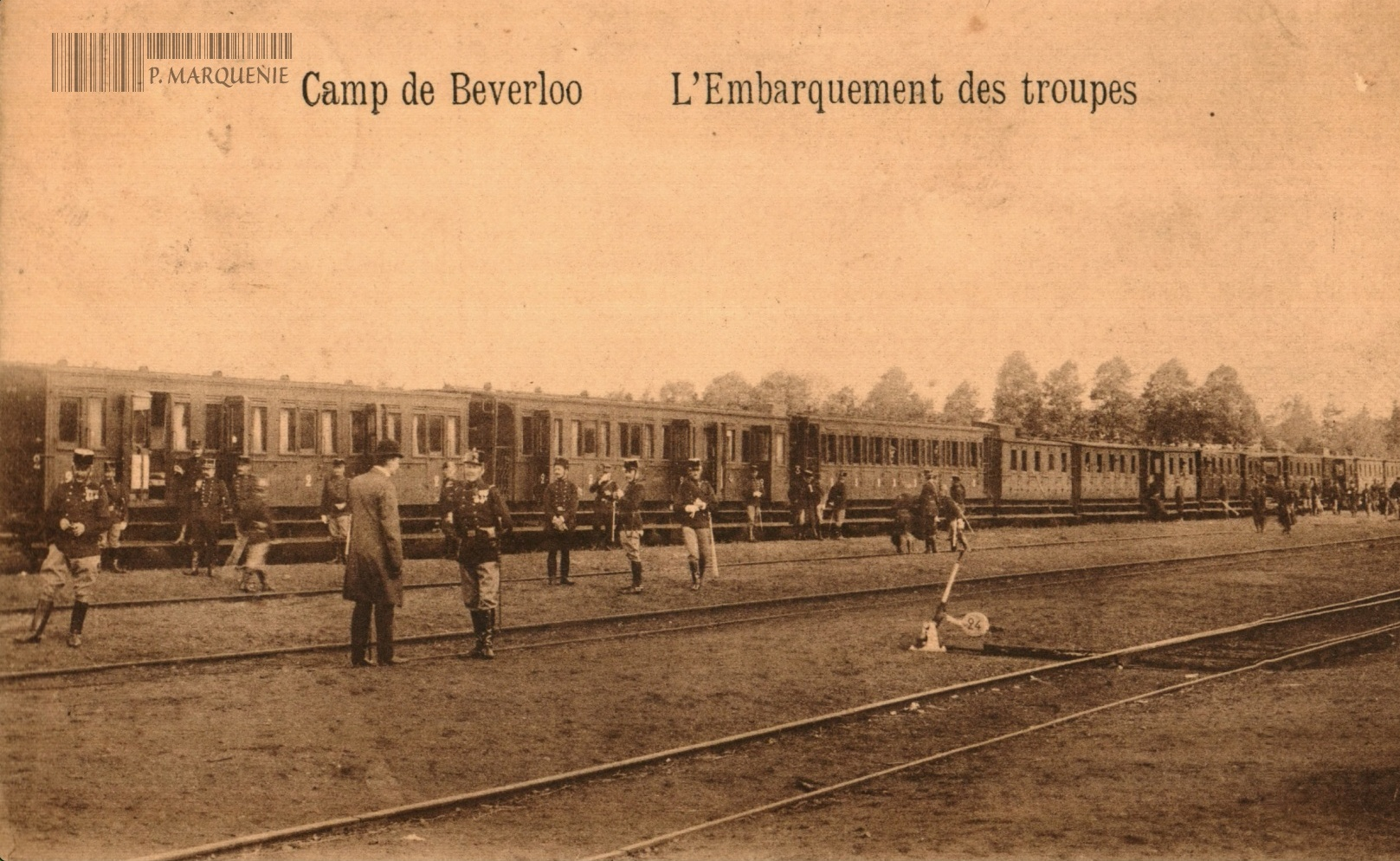
Embarkment of the troops

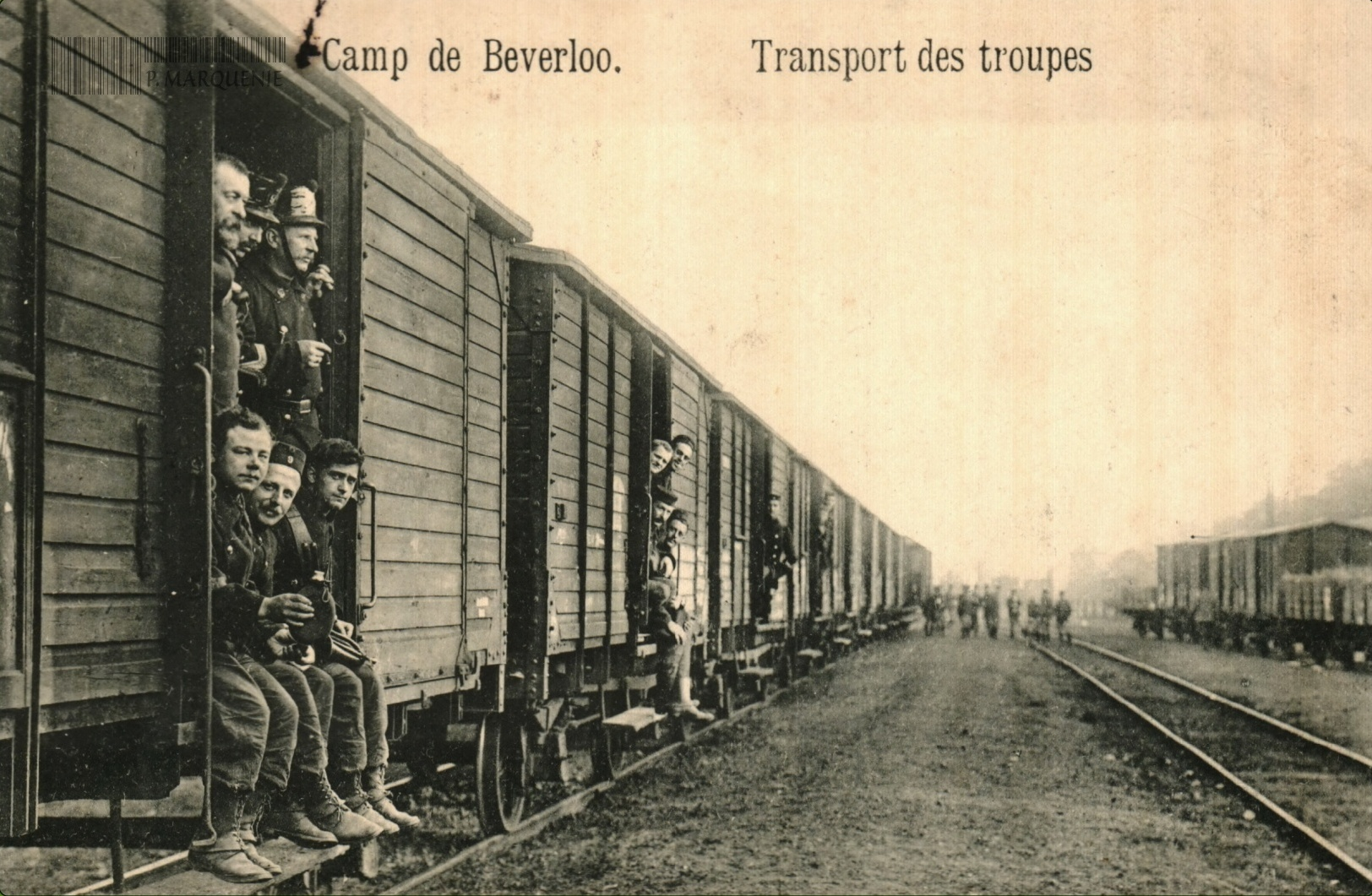
Troop transport
