= 11th Reconnaissance Squadron (disambiguation) =

The 11th Reconnaissance Squadron is a United States Air Force unit, originally constituted as the '11th Observation Squadron' in February 1942. It has held this designation since July 1995 till May 2016.

11th Reconnaissance Squadron may also refer to:

- 524th Special Operations Squadron, designated the '11th Reconnaissance Squadron (Light)' from January 1941 to August 1941
- 701st Tactical Air Support Squadron, designated the '11th Reconnaissance Squadron (Heavy)' for seven days in 1942

== See also ==
- 11th Tactical Reconnaissance Squadron
