= Richard H. Cosgriff =

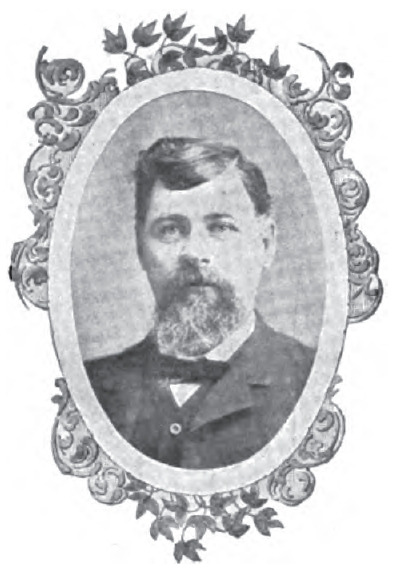
- Richard Cosgriff and the Army Medal of Honor
- Born: December 15, 1845; County Cork, Ireland
- Died: November 2, 1910 (aged 64); Chippewa Falls, Wisconsin, US
- Burial place: Hope Cemetery; Chippewa Falls, Wisconsin
- Military career
- Allegiance: United States of America; Union
- Branch: United States Army; Union Army
- Service years: 1861–1865
- Rank: Private
- Unit: 4th Iowa Volunteer Cavalry Regiment
- Conflicts: American Civil War
- Awards: Medal of Honor

Richard H. Cosgriff, Sr., (December 15, 1845 – November 2, 1910) was a Union Army soldier in the American Civil War and a recipient of the United States military's highest decoration, the Medal of Honor. An Irish immigrant, his family eventually settled in Wisconsin, where he would spend most of the rest of his life. Enlisting in an Iowa cavalry regiment, he was awarded the Medal of Honor for capturing a Confederate battle flag during an engagement in the last month of the war. After returning to Wisconsin, he worked as a businessman in the lumber and printing industries until his death at age 64.

== Early years ==
Born in County Cork, Ireland, Cosgriff's family immigrated to the United States when he was three years old, in 1849. (Note: Cosgriff's military records incorrectly give his place of birth as "Dunkirk County, New York".) The family lived in Dunkirk, New York, for six years before moving to Ohio in 1855 and then to Wisconsin two years later. In Wisconsin, Cosgriff worked as a printer and a log rafter. In 1861, he rafted down the Mississippi River to Davenport, Iowa, and enlisted in the Union Army on September 25. Exactly two months later, he was mustered into service as a private with Company L of the 4th Regiment Iowa Volunteer Cavalry. He reenlisted for another term of service on December 21, 1863.

== Military service ==
One week after the surrender of Confederate General Robert E. Lee at the Battle of Appomattox Court House, which ended all major engagements of the war, Cosgriff's unit moved towards Columbus, Georgia. Their intention was to capture the city's supply depots, naval yards, and weapons factories. On Easter Sunday, April 16, 1865, the 4th Iowa Cavalry and other regiments attacked a bridge over the Chattahoochee River which led into Columbus. When the Union general, James H. Wilson, called for cavalrymen to charge the covered bridge and capture the soldiers guarding it, Cosgriff volunteered. He and the other volunteers rode past two lines of entrenchments and fought hand-to-hand with the bridge guard. During the struggle, Cosgriff knocked down a Confederate flag bearer with the butt of his rifle, capturing both the flag and the bearer. The cavalrymen successfully subdued the bridge guard and captured two heavy guns. For these actions, Cosgriff was awarded the Medal of Honor two months later, on June 17. His official Medal of Honor citation reads: "Capture of flag in a personal encounter with its bearer." The flag, from an unknown regiment, is now held by the Museum of the Confederacy in Richmond, Virginia.

== Later life ==
With the war ended, Cosgriff was mustered out of the Army on August 8, 1865, in Atlanta, Georgia. Returning to Wisconsin, he worked as a farmer and founded a lumber business in Hudson. In 1871, he married Mary A. Coldthrust and moved to Chippewa Falls, Wisconsin; the couple later had five children. He farmed in Minnesota for a few years but moved back to Wisconsin in 1887. Back in Chippewa Falls, he was involved in several business ventures, including a printing company. He died at age 64 and was buried at Hope Cemetery in Chippewa Falls.

== See also ==
- List of American Civil War Medal of Honor recipients: A–F
