= Eleventh of the month =

Recurring ordinal calendar date

The eleventh of the month or eleventh day of the month is the recurring calendar date position corresponding to the day numbered 11 of each month. In the Gregorian calendar (and other calendars that number days sequentially within a month), this day occurs in every month of the year, and therefore occurs twelve times per year.

- Eleventh of January
- Eleventh of February
- Eleventh of March
- Eleventh of April
- Eleventh of May
- Eleventh of June
- Eleventh of July
- Eleventh of August
- Eleventh of September
- Eleventh of October
- Eleventh of November
- Eleventh of December

In addition to these dates, this date occurs in months of many other calendars, such as the Bengali calendar and the Hebrew calendar.

== See also ==
- Eleventh (disambiguation)
