= Harlan, Oregon =

Unincorporated community in Oregon, US

Coordinates: 44.539842°N 123.693165°W

Harlan is an unincorporated community in Lincoln County, Oregon, United States, about 30 miles west of Corvallis. It is located in a valley of the Central Oregon Coast Range in the Siuslaw National Forest. The community's economy was once based on logging and sawmills. Cattle ranching is another mainstay of the local economy.

James R. Harlan helped establish a post office at this locale and the office was named for him. Harlan post office ran from 1890 until 1968; Harlan was the first postmaster. Harlan Cemetery was also founded in 1890.

In 1915, Harlan had a public school and a population of 200. A new school and a store were built in 1926. Harlan School closed in 1967 and students then attended school in Eddyville. The store, which housed the post office and was also a gas station, closed in 1971 and is now a private residence. In 1993, author Ralph Friedman reported that there was "nothing much" in Harlan. Chapel of the Valley church, built in 1961, still serves a congregation. The last commercial sawmill in Harlan shut down in the early 1980s. As of 2008, a small one-man hobby sawmill still operated.
