= 11th Regiment of Connecticut Militia =

11th Regiment of Militia
- Active: 1739–1840
- Allegiance: Connecticut Colony (1739–1776); State of Connecticut (1776–1840)
- Type: militia
- Role: Companies of infantry, cavalry, and grenadiers
- Part of: Connecticut Militia, Connecticut Line
- Engagements: American Revolutionary War: Bunker Hill and Siege of Boston 1775; Long Island and New York and New Jersey 1776; Rhode Island 1778

Commanders
- Notable commanders: Major General Israel Putnam

The 11th Regiment of Militia was raised in October 1739 by the governor of the colony of Connecticut to provide an overarching organization of military units within the colonies. These regiments served as part of the Continental Army during the American Revolutionary War. The regiment contributed many of its forces to regular regiments in the Continental Army.

Prior to the Revolutionary War, the regiment consisted of companies from Plainfield, Canterbury, Pomfret, Killingly, and Voluntown. During the Revolutionary War, the companies were from Pomfret, Woodstock, and Killingly.
