= Beverloo Camp =

Military installation in Leopoldsburg, Belgium

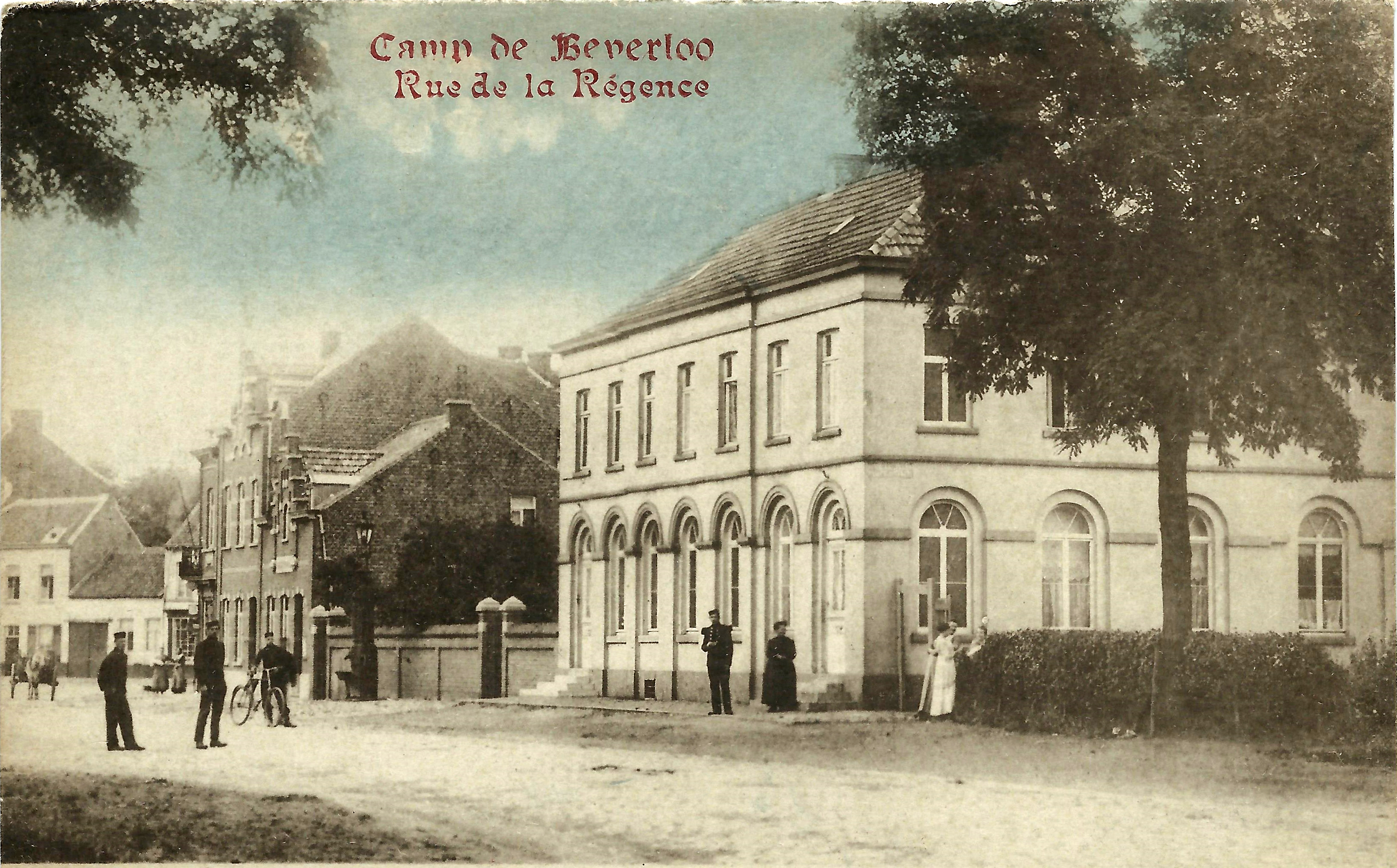
Postcard depicting Beverloo Camp in the early 20th century

Beverloo Camp (French: Camp de Beverloo, Dutch: Kamp van Beverloo) was a military installation at Leopoldsburg (Bourg-Léopold in French), Belgium; 70 km southeast of Antwerp.

The camp was created in 1835, shortly after the independence of Belgium from the Netherlands. It acquired a permanent character in 1850.

During World War I and World War II it was occupied by German troops. In May 1944 the camp was bombed by the Allied forces, damaging some blocks. A part of the Camp was also used as a prisoner of war camp by the Germans.

A museum celebrating the camp's history exists at what used to be its hospital building.

== Beverloo Soldiers' Council ==
The Beverloo Soldiers' Council was set up by mutinous German soldiers in November 1918 as part of the November Revolution. The first mutiny, by Alsatian soldiers occurred on 12 May 1918. They worked closely with the Brussels Soldiers' Council.

== Interwar years ==
In 1920, the facilities hosted the pistol and rifle shooting events for the 1920 Summer Olympics. While those events took place, combat engineers detonated grenades four kilometres from the shooting stands.

For World War II, during the German occupation, following the Battle of France, 10,000 members of the Hitler Youth forming the 12th SS Panzer Division Hitlerjugend were trained at the camp. During the war, it was also used as a transit camp for the Holocaust. Josef Nassy, an American black artist of Jewish descent, was imprisoned here during World War II.

== More ==
- Beverloo Camp Railway
- A website about the history of Leopoldsburg and Beverloo Camp: 3970Leopoldsburg.be
