= 11th (Ashcraft's) Mississippi Cavalry Regiment =

Cavalry regiment of the Confederate States Army

11th Mississippi Cavalry Regiment
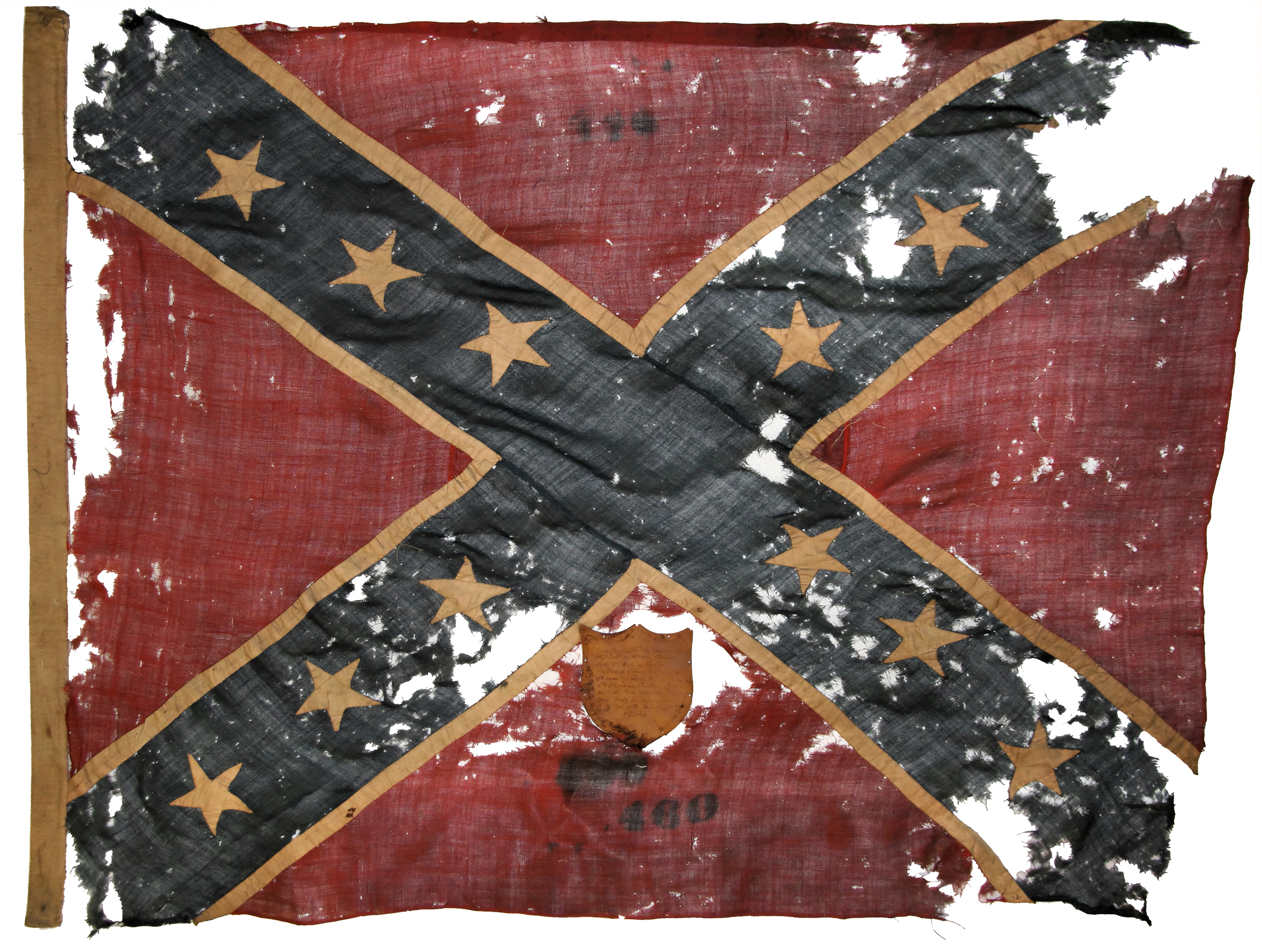
- Regimental Standard of the 11th (Ashcraft's) Mississippi Cavalry captured at Selma in 1865
- Active: 1864–1865
- Disbanded: May 16, 1865
- Country: Confederate States
- Allegiance: Mississippi
- Branch: Army
- Type: Cavalry
- Size: Regiment
- Part of: Armstrong's Brigade
- Nickname: "Ashcraft's regiment"
- Facings: Yellow
- Battles: American Civil War; Battle of Ezra Church; Battle of Egypt; Battle of Selma

Commanders
- Commanding Officer: Col. Thomas C. Ashcraft

The 11th Mississippi Cavalry Regiment, also known as Ashcraft's Mississippi Cavalry Regiment, was a cavalry formation of the Confederate States Army in the Western Theater of the American Civil War from 1864 to 1865. It was commanded by Colonel Thomas C. Ashcraft.

== History ==
The regiment was organized on June 16, 1864, in Mississippi by consolidating the 2d (Harris') Mississippi Cavalry Battalion (State Troops) and the 3d (Ashcraft's) Cavalry Battalion, to consist of eight companies. It was assigned on February 18, 1865, to Armstrong's Brigade; an element of Chalmers' Cavalry Division, Forrest's Cavalry Corps. It was expanded and reorganized on March 20, 1865, by the consolidation of the 2d (Lowry's) Mississippi Cavalry (State Troops) and Ham's Mississippi Cavalry regiments, to consist of ten companies.

Skirmishing with the Federals in Mississippi and Alabama, the regiment was prominent in the battles of Egypt and Selma. While following the retreating enemy through, and out of, Selma, Alabama, on April 2, 1865; Private Charles A. Swan, Company K, 4th Iowa Cavalry Regiment, captured the regimental color and bearer, who said it belonged to the "Eleventh Mississippi." Included in the surrender of the Department of Alabama, Mississippi, and East Louisiana on May 4, 1865; it was subsequently disbanded on May 16, 1865, at Columbus, Mississippi.

== Regimental order of battle ==
Units of Ashcraft's regiment included:

- Company A (composed of Companies B, D, E, and G, of Lowry's regiment, consolidated)
- Company B (formerly Company A, of Ham's regiment)
- Company C (formed of Companies C, D, E, G, I, and K, of Ham's regiment, consolidated)
- Company D (formerly Company L, of Lowry's regiment)
- Company E (formerly Company B, of Ashcraft's regiment)
- Company F (formed of Companies D, E, G, and K, of Ashcraft's regiment)
- Company G (formerly Company C, of Ashcraft's regiment)
- Company H (formerly Company F, of Ham's regiment)
- Company I (formerly Company I, of Ashcraft's regiment)
- Company K (formerly Companies A, H, and F, of Lowry's regiment)

== See also ==
- List of Confederate units from Mississippi
