= Eleventh Amendment =

Eleventh Amendment may refer to:

- The Eleventh Amendment to the United States Constitution, restricting the ability to sue states in Federal court
- Eleventh Amendment of the Constitution of India, relating to the election procedure of the Vice President of India
- The Eleventh Amendment of the Constitution of Ireland, which permits the state to ratify the Maastricht Treaty
- The Eleventh Amendment of the Constitution of South Africa
