= 11th dimension =

11th dimension may refer to:

- 11-dimensional supergravity, a field theory that combines the principles of supersymmetry and general relativity
- 11-dimensional spacetime, which appears in M-theory, a proposed "master theory" that unifies the five superstring theories
  - Introduction to M-theory
- "11th Dimension" (song), by Julian Casablancas, 2009
- 11th Dimension (album), by Ski Mask the Slump God, 2024

== See also ==
- Superstring theory
- 'Pataphysics
