= 11th Public Security Division =

151st Division (1948–51) 142nd Division (1951–52) 11th Public Security Division (1952–55)
- Active: November 1948 - June 1955
- Country: People's Republic of China
- Branch: People's Liberation Army
- Type: Division
- Role: Security
- Engagements: Chinese Civil War

The 151st Division (Chinese: 第151师) was created in November 1948 under the Regulation of the Redesignations of All Organizations and Units of the Army, issued by Central Military Commission on November 1, 1948, basing on the 10th Independent Division of Northeastern Field Army, formed in January 1948.

The division was a part of 38th Corps, under which command it took part in many major battles during the Chinese Civil War. In March 1953 it stationed at Longzhou, Guangxi.

In February 1951 the division was attached to the newly formed 48th Corps and renamed as 142nd Division (Chinese: 第142师), and all its regiments were renamed as follows:

- 424th Infantry Regiment (former 451st);
- 425th Infantry Regiment (former 452nd);
- 426th Infantry Regiment (former 453rd).

On April 1, 1952, the division was re-organized and renamed as 11th Public Security Division(Chinese: 公安第11师)(2nd Formation), and all its regiments were renamed as follows:

- 31st Public Security Regiment (former 424th);
- 32nd Public Security Regiment (former 425th);
- 33rd Public Security Regiment (former 426th).

In December 32nd Regiment was detached from the division and entered Korea as a part of People's Volunteer Army.

In January 1953 the division moved to eastern Guangdong for coastal defense mission.

In June 1955 the division was disbanded. The divisional HQ was transferred to the People's Liberation Army Navy and became the division HQ, 5th Naval Aviation Division. 31st Regiment became Garrison Regiment of Nan'ao (now as 1st Coastal Defense Regiment of Guangzhou Military Region), and 33rd Regiment was transferred to 9th Public Security Border Defense Division.
