= 11th Street =

11th Street or Eleventh Street may refer to:

- 11th Street station (Indiana), a commuter rail station in Michigan City, Indiana
- 11th Street station (SEPTA), a subway station in Philadelphia, Pennsylvania
- Eleventh Street station (Miami), a Miami Metromover station
- Museum Campus/11th Street station, a commuter rail station in Chicago, Illinois
- 11th Street Bridge in Tulsa, Oklahoma
- 11th Street Bridges in Washington, D.C.
