= 11th National Congress of the Kuomintang =

The 11th National Congress of the Kuomintang (Chinese: 中國國民黨第十一次全國代表大会) was the eleventh national congress of the Kuomintang, held on 12–18 November 1976 in Taipei, Taiwan. This is the first party congress after the Republic of China lost international recognition in 1971 and the death of Chiang Kai-shek in 1975.

== Results ==
Congress members fully supported Chiang Ching-kuo to become the Chairperson of the Kuomintang after the death of the party chairperson Chiang Kai-shek on 5 April 1975.

== See also ==
- Kuomintang
