= 11th Armoured Regiment (India) =

Armoured regiment of the Indian Army

11 Armoured Regiment
- Active: 1984 – present
- Country: India
- Allegiance: India
- Branch: Indian Army
- Type: Armoured Corps
- Size: Regiment
- Nicknames: The Double First; Sprocket Power Risala
- Mottos: जीत ही जीत ‘Jeet-Hi-Jeet’ (Always Victorious)
- Equipment: T-72 tanks

Commanders
- Colonel of the Regiment: Lieutenant General Rajesh Pushkar

Insignia
- Abbreviation: 11 Armd Regt

11 Armoured Regiment is an armoured regiment of the Indian Army.

== Formation ==
11 Armoured Regiment was raised on 07 May 1984 by Lieutenant Colonel HS Lamba at Kaluchak, Jammu in Jammu and Kashmir. It has an all-India all-class composition, drawing troops from various castes and religions.

== Equipment ==
The regiment is presently equipped with T-72 tanks.

== Regimental Insignia ==
The Regimental insignia consists of crossed lances with pennons, overlaid with the numeral "11" inside a sprocket at the crossing of the lances, mounted by an armoured fist and a scroll at the base with the regimental motto in Devanagari script.

The motto of the regiment is जीत ही जीत (Jeet-Hi-Jeet), which translates to ‘Always Victorious’.
