= 4th Iowa Cavalry Regiment =

Cavalry regiment of the Union Army

- National Color of the 4th Iowa Cavalry
- Active: 1861–1865
- Disbanded: August 24, 1865
- Country: United States
- Allegiance: Iowa
- Branch: Union Army
- Type: Cavalry
- Size: Regiment
- Engagements: American Civil War; Siege of Vicksburg; Battle of Big Black River; Siege of Jackson; Battle of Brice's Crossroads; Battle of Little Blue River; Second Battle of Independence; Battle of Byram's Ford; Battle of Westport; Battle of Marais des Cygnes; Battle of Mine Creek; Battle of Marmiton River; Battle of Egypt; Battle of Selma; Battle of Columbus

The 4th Iowa Cavalry Regiment was a cavalry formation of the Union Army during the American Civil War.

== Background ==
The 4th Iowa Cavalry was organized at Camp Harlan in Mount Pleasant, Iowa, beginning in September 1861, and mustered in for three years service under the command of Colonel Asbury B. Porter. Companies A, E, and F mustered November 23; Companies B, C, D, I, K, and M mustered November 25; Company G mustered November 27; Company L mustered December 24; and Company H mustered January 1, 1862.

The regiment was attached to 2nd Division, Army of Southwest Missouri, Department of Missouri, to July 1862. District of Eastern Arkansas, Department of Missouri, to December 1862. 2nd Brigade, 1st Cavalry Division, District of Eastern Arkansas, Department of the Tennessee, to January 1863. 2nd Brigade, 2nd Cavalry Division, XIII Corps, Department of the Tennessee, to May 1863. Unattached, XV Corps, Army of the Tennessee, to August 1863. Winslow's Cavalry Brigade, XVII Corps, to May 1864. 2nd Brigade, 1st Cavalry Division, XVI Corps, to July 1864. 2nd Brigade, 2nd Cavalry Division, District of West Tennessee, to November 1864. 1st Brigade, 4th Division, Wilson's Cavalry Corps, Military Division Mississippi, to December 1864. 2nd Brigade, Cavalry Division, District of West Tennessee, to February 1865. 1st Brigade, 4th Division, Cavalry Corps, Military Division Mississippi, to June 1865. Department of Georgia to August 1865.

The 4th Iowa Cavalry mustered out of service at Atlanta, Georgia, on August 10, 1865, and was discharged at Davenport, Iowa, on August 24, 1865.

== History ==
Duty at Camp Harlan until February 1862. 1st Battalion moved to St. Louis, Mo., February 26, 2nd Battalion February 28 and 3rd Battalion March 3, 1862. At Benton Barracks, Mo., until March 10. Ordered to Rolla, Mo., March 10; thence to Springfield, Mo., and duty there until April 14. Expedition to Salem, Mo., March 12–19, 1862 (Companies F and L). Ordered to join Curtis at Batesville, Ark., April 14. Skirmish at Nitre Cave, White River, April 18 (Companies G and K). Talbot's Farm, White River, April 19 (Companies E, F, G, and K). Skirmish, White River, May 6. Little Red River June 5. (Company F detached for duty with Chief Commissary and as provost guard at Helena, Ark., May 1862 to April 1863.) Mt. Olive June 7, 1862 (Company F). Gist's Plantation July 14, 1862 (Company F). March to Helena, Ark., June 11-July 14. Duty at Helena until April 1863. Polk's Plantation September 20, 1862 (Company D). Expedition from Helena to LaGrange September 26 (2 companies). Jones' Lane or Lick Creek October 11 (Companies A, G, and H). Marianna and LaGrange November 8. Expedition from Helena to Arkansas Post November 16–21, and to Grenada, Miss., November 27-December 5. Oakland, Miss., December 3. Expedition to Big and Little Creeks March 6–12, 1863. Big Creek March 8. St. Charles and St. Francis Counties April 8. Moved to Milliken's Bend, La., April 28–30. Reconnaissance to Bayou Macon May 1–4. March to New Carthage May 5–8. (Company G detached on courier duty at Young's Point, La., during May.) Fourteen-Mile Creek May 12–13. Mississippi Springs May 13. Hall's Ferry May 13 (detachment). Baldwyn's Ferry May 13 (detachment). Jackson May 14. Haines Bluff May 18 (Company B). Siege of Vicksburg, Miss., May 18-July 4. Engaged in outpost duty against Johnston between Big Black and Yazoo Rivers. Mechanicsburg May 24 and 29. Expedition from Haines Bluff to Satartia and Mechanicsville June 2–8 (detachment). Barronsville June 18. Bear Creek or Jones' Plantation June 22 (Companies A, F, I, and K). Big Black River, near Birdsong Ferry, June 22 (detachment). Hill's Plantation, near Bear Creek, June 22. Messenger's Ferry, Big Black River, June 26. Advance on Jackson July 5–10. Siege of Jackson July 10–17. Near Canton July 12. Bolton's Depot July 16. Bear Creek, Canton, July 17. Canton July 18. Raid from Big Black on Mississippi Central Railroad and to Memphis, Tenn., August 10–22. Payne's Plantation, near Grenada, August 18. Panola August 20. Coldwater August 21. Expedition to Yazoo City September 21-October 1 (detachment). Brownsville September 28. Morris Ford, near Burton, September 29. Expedition toward Canton October 14–20. Brownsville October 15. Canton Road, near Brownsville, October 15–16. Near Clinton and Vernon Cross Roads October 16. Bogue Chitto Creek October 17. Robinson's Mills, near Livingston, October 17. Louisville Road, near Clinton and Brownsville, October 18. Expedition to Natchez December 4–17 (Companies C, H, I, K, L, and M). Near Natchez December 7. Meridian Campaign February 3–28, 1864. Big Black River Bridge, February 3. Raymond Road, Edwards Ferry, Champion Hill, Baker's Creek and near Bolton's Depot February 4. Jackson and Clinton February 5. Brandon February 7. Morton February 8. Meridian February 9–13. Hillsborough February 10. Tallahatta February 13. Meridian February 14. Near Meridian February 19. Veterans on furlough March 4 to April 24. Reported at Memphis, Tenn., April 24. Non-veterans at Vicksburg, Miss., until April 29; then moved to Memphis. Sturgis' Campaign against Forrest April 30-May 12. Sturgis' Expedition to Guntown, Miss., June 1–13. Ripley June 7. Brice's Cross Roads, near Guntown, June 10. Ripley June 11. Smith's Expedition to Tupelo, Miss., July 5–21. Near Ripley July 7. Cherry Creek July 10. Plenitude July 10. Harrisburg Road July 13. Tupelo July 14–15. Old Town or Tishamingo Creek July 15. Smith's Expedition to Oxford, Miss., August 1–30. Tallahatchie River August 7–9, Hurricane Creek and Oxford August 9. Hurricane Creek August 13, 14 and 19. College Hill August 21. Oxford August 22. (Forrest's attack on Memphis August 21, Company G.) Moved to Little Rock, Ark., September 2–9. Campaign against Price in Arkansas and Missouri September 17-November 30. Moved to Batesville and Pocahontas, Ark.; thence to Cape Girardeau, St. Louis, Jefferson City and Independence, Mo.. Trading Post and Fort Scott, Kansas, Pea Ridge and Fayetteville, Ark., Tahlequah and Webber's Falls, Indian Territory, returning via Pea Ridge, Springfield and Rolla to St. Louis. Engaged at Brownsville September 28. Morris Bluff September 29 (Company D). Little Blue October 21. Independence October 22. Westport, Big Blue and State Line October 23. Trading Post October 25. Marias Des Cygnes, Osage, Mine Creek October 25. Charlot Prairie October 25. At St. Louis until December 9; then at Louisville, Ky., until February 1865.

A detachment at Memphis, Tenn., September 1 to December 20, 1864. Scout near Memphis November 10. Skirmish on Germantown Pike, near Memphis, December 14, detachments of Companies A and B. Grierson's Raid on Mobile & Ohio Railroad December 21, 1864, to January 5, 1865. Okolona, Miss., December 27, 1864. Egypt Station December 28. Franklin January 2, 1865. Rejoined regiment at Louisville, Ky., January 15, 1865. Dismounted men of the regiment moved from Memphis, Tenn., to Louisville, Ky., January 2, 1865. Moved to Gravelly Springs, Ala., February 1865, and duty there until March 20. Expedition to Florence March 1–6. Wilson's Raid to Macon, Ga., March 20 to May 10. Company G served as escort to General Emory Upton, Commanding Division. Montevallo March 30. Near Montevallo March 31. Six-Mile Creek March 31. Ebenezer Church April 1. Selma April 2. Fikes Ferry, Cahawba River, April 7. Wetumpka April 13. Columbus, Ga., April 16. Capture of Macon April 20. Duty at Macon and Atlanta, Ga., until August.

== Casualties ==
The regiment lost a total of 254 men during service; 4 officers and 51 enlisted men killed or mortally wounded, 5 officers and 194 enlisted men died of disease.

== Commanding officers ==
- Colonel Asbury B. Porter
- Colonel Edward Francis Winslow
- Lieutenant Colonel Simeon D. Swan - commanded at the siege of Vicksburg
- Lieutenant Colonel Thomas Drummond - After leaving the regiment, Drummond joined the 5th Cavalry Regiment, which he commanded during the Battle of Five Forks where he was killed in action.
- Major Abial Richmond Pierce - commanded at the battles of Westport and Mine Creek

== Notable members ==
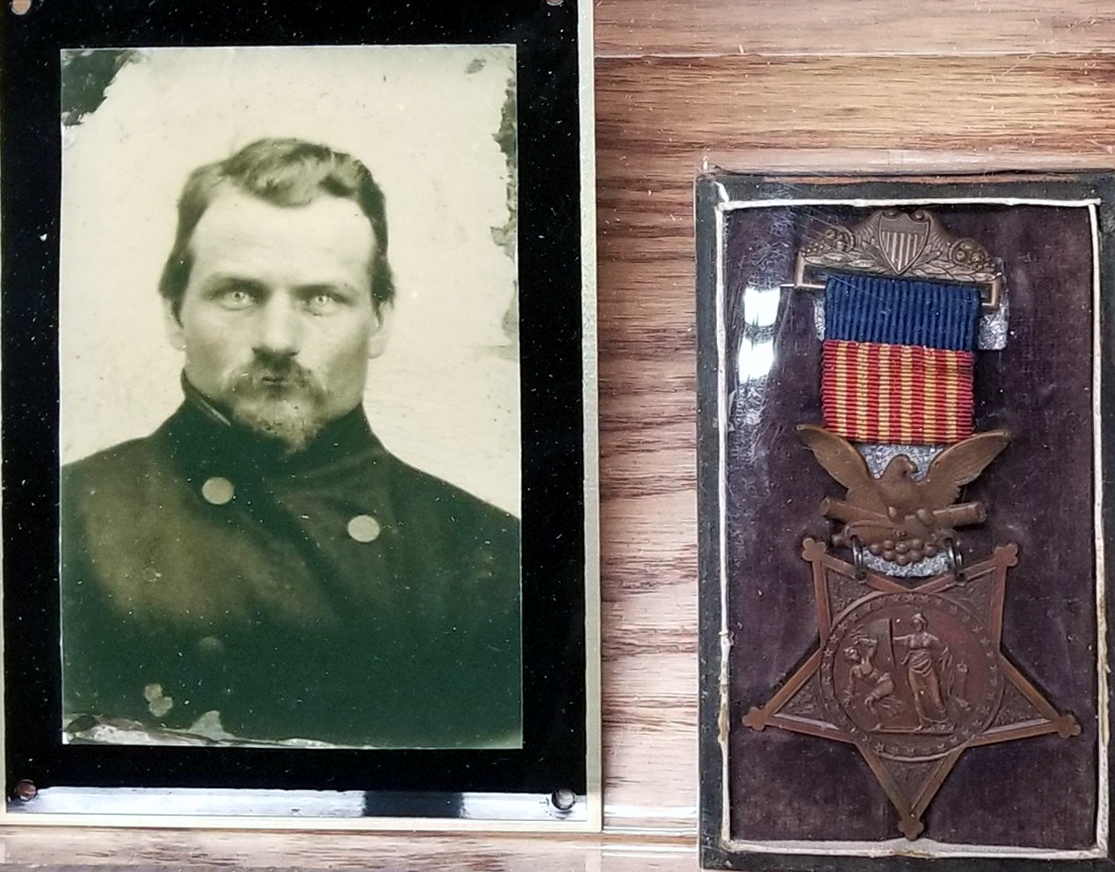
Edward J. Bebb's Medal of Honor at the Iowa Gold Star Military Museum.

- Sergeant Norman F. Bates, Company E - Medal of Honor recipient for action at Columbus, Georgia
- Private Edward J. Bebb, Company D - Medal of Honor recipient for action at Columbus, Georgia
- Private Richard H. Cosgriff, Company L - Medal of Honor recipient for action at Columbus, Georgia
- Private Nicholas Fanning, Company B - Medal of Honor recipient for action at the battle of Selma
- Private John H. Hays, Company F - Medal of Honor recipient for action at Columbus, Georgia
- Private James P. Miller, Company D - Medal of Honor recipient for action at the battle of Selma
- Corporal Richard H. Morgan, Company A - Medal of Honor recipient for action at Columbus, Georgia
- Private Charles A. Swan, Company K - Medal of Honor recipient for action at the battle of Selma
- Corporal Newton Earp, Company F - Oldest son of Nicholas Porter Earp, and older sibling of Western lawmen Virgil, Morgan and Wyatt Earp.
- Private William E. Birkhimer - General who was awarded the Medal of Honor during the Philippine War.

== See also ==
- List of Iowa Civil War Units
