= 11th Garrison Division of Shenyang Military Region =

- Active: 1949.9 - 1992
- Country: People's Republic of China
- Branch: 50th Corps
- Type: Division
- Role: Infantry
- Engagements: Chinese Civil War, Korean War

The 150th Division (2nd Formation), then 11th Garrison Division of Shenyang Military Region was a military formation of the People's Liberation Army of the People's Republic of China.

The division was activated in September 1949 from the 167th Division (1st Formation), which could be traced to the 58th Temporary Division, Republic of China Army defected in Yingkou, Liaoning province during the Liaoshen Campaign on February 25, 1948.

In 1950 the division joined People's Volunteer Army (Chinese People's Volunteers (CPV) or Chinese Communist Forces (CCF)) during the Korean War with a standard strength of approximately 10,000 men. It was a component of the 50th Corps, consisting of the 448th, 449th, and 450th Regiments.

During the Fourth Campaign of Korean War, the division, with the Corps, persisted on the battlefields along the Han River near Seoul for 50 days and inflicted heavy losses on the United Nations. In April 1951 it pulled out from Korea for R&R. By June the division re-entered Korea for the second time. During the War the division inflicted 4517 casualties to UN Forces.

In April 1955 the 150th Division pulled out from Korea and stationed in Shenyang Military District.

By then the division was composed of:

- 448th Infantry Regiment;
- 449th Infantry Regiment;
- 450th Infantry Regiment;
- 530th Artillery Regiment.

In 1960 it renamed 150th Army Division (Chinese: 陆军第150师).

In December 1964 it converted to Independent Division of the Liaoning Provincial Military District (Chinese: 辽宁省军区独立师) and detached from the 50th Corps. The division was officially composed of 4 infantry regiments (1st to 4th), an antiaircraft artillery battalion, a communication battalion and an engineer battalion, however the artillery regiment was still attached to the division.

In December 1965 530th Artillery Regiment was formally transferred to 1st Garrison Division of Shenyang Military Region.

In July 1966 the division renamed as 1st Independent Division of the Liaoning Provincial Military District (Chinese: 辽宁省军区独立第1师) following 2nd Independent Division of Liaoning Provincial Military District's formation.

In October 1969 it moved to Chifeng, Inner Mongolia.

In February 1976 the division renamed as Independent Division of the Liaoning Provincial Military District following 2nd Independent Division of Liaoning Provincial Military District's disbandment.

On January 10, 1981, the division was re-organized and converted to 11th Garrison Division of Shenyang Military Region(Chinese: 沈阳军区守备第11师) a part of Chifeng Garrison District. Soon it was renamed as 11th Garrison Division of Chifeng Garrison District(Chinese: 赤峰守备区守备第11师).

On April 11, 1981, Tank Regiment, 11th Garrison Division was activated at Bairin Right Banner, Inner Mongolia. The regiment's equipment included T-34s and SU-76s retired from Tank Regiment, 68th Army Corps. By then the division was composed of:

- 31st Garrison Regiment;
- 32nd Garrison Regiment;
- 33rd Garrison Regiment;
- Tank Regiment;
- Artillery Regiment.

On October 5, 1985, Tank Regiment was reduced to Independent Tank Battalion, 11th Garrison Division, retiring all its SU-76s.

On May 1, 1991, the division was reduced to 11th Garrison Brigade of Shenyang Military Region(Chinese: 沈阳军区守备第11旅).

In 1992 the brigade was disbanded along with the Garrison District.
