= 11th Regiment =

11th Regiment or Eleventh Regiment may refer to:

== Australia ==
- 2/11th Armoured Car Regiment (Australia)
- 11th Engineer Regiment (Australia)
- 11th (North Auckland) Mounted Rifles

== Canada ==
- Irish Fusiliers of Canada

== Confederate States ==
- 11th Alabama Infantry Regiment
- 11th Arkansas Infantry Regiment
- 11th (Ashcraft's) Mississippi Cavalry Regiment
- 11th (Perrin's) Mississippi Cavalry Regiment
- 11th Mississippi Infantry Regiment
- 11th Missouri Infantry Regiment (Confederate)
- 11th Texas Cavalry Regiment
- 11th Texas Infantry Regiment
- 11th Virginia Cavalry Regiment
- 11th Virginia Infantry Regiment

== France ==
- 1st-11th Cuirassier Regiment
- 11e régiment parachutiste de choc
- 11th Marine Artillery Regiment

== German Empire ==
- 2nd Westphalian Hussar Regiment, No. 11

== Greece ==
- 11th Infantry Regiment (Greece)

== India ==
- 11th Armoured Regiment (India)

== Italy ==
- 11th Alpini Regiment
- 11th Engineer Regiment (Italy)
- 11th Field Artillery Regiment (Italy)
- 11th Heavy Field Artillery Regiment (Italy)
- 11th Infantry Regiment "Casale"
- 11th Signal Regiment (Italy)

== Malaysia ==
- 11th Special Service Regiment

== New Zealand ==
- 11th Coast Regiment, Royal New Zealand Artillery

== Pakistan ==
- 11th Cavalry (Frontier Force)

== Philippines ==
- 11th Field Artillery Regiment (PA)

== Thailand ==
- 11th Infantry Regiment (Thailand)

== United Kingdom ==
- 11 Explosive Ordnance Disposal and Search Regiment RLC
- 11th Hussars
- Devonshire Regiment

== United States ==
- 11th Armored Cavalry Regiment
- 11th Coast Artillery (United States)
- 11th Field Artillery Regiment
- 11th Illinois Cavalry Regiment
- 11th Illinois Infantry Regiment
- 11th Indiana Infantry Regiment
- 11th Infantry Regiment (United States)
- 11th Iowa Infantry Regiment
- 11th Kentucky Infantry Regiment
- 11th Maine Infantry Regiment
- 11th Marine Regiment
- 11th Massachusetts Infantry Regiment
- 11th Massachusetts Regiment
- 11th Michigan Cavalry Regiment
- 11th Michigan Infantry Regiment
- 11th Michigan Infantry Regiment (reorganized)
- 11th Minnesota Infantry Regiment
- 11th New Hampshire Infantry Regiment
- 11th New York Infantry Regiment
- 11th Ohio Infantry Regiment
- 11th Pennsylvania Infantry Regiment
- 11th Pennsylvania Regiment
- 11th Regiment of Connecticut Militia
- 11th Tennessee Cavalry Regiment
- 11th Vermont Infantry Regiment
- 11th Virginia Regiment
- 11th West Virginia Infantry Regiment
- 11th Wisconsin Infantry Regiment

== See also ==
- 11th Army (disambiguation)
- 11th Brigade (disambiguation)
- 11th Division (disambiguation)
- 11 Squadron (disambiguation)
