= Eleventh Avenue =

Eleventh Avenue or 11 Av may refer to:

== Roads and transportation ==
- Eleventh Avenue (Manhattan), a street in New York City
- Westernmost segment of IRT Flushing Line, which runs under 11th Avenue in Queens
- Previous name of Expo/Crenshaw station

== Other uses ==
- Eleventh Avenue (album), a studio album of the band Ammonia
- 11 Av, the eleventh day of Av, the fifth month of the Hebrew calendar
