= 11th cabinet =

11th cabinet may refer to:

- 11th cabinet of India 1989
- 11th cabinet of Turkey
- 11th Cabinet of Malaysia
- 11th Cabinet of North Korea
