= Charles A. Swan =

American Medal of Honor recipient

Private Charles Alexander Swan
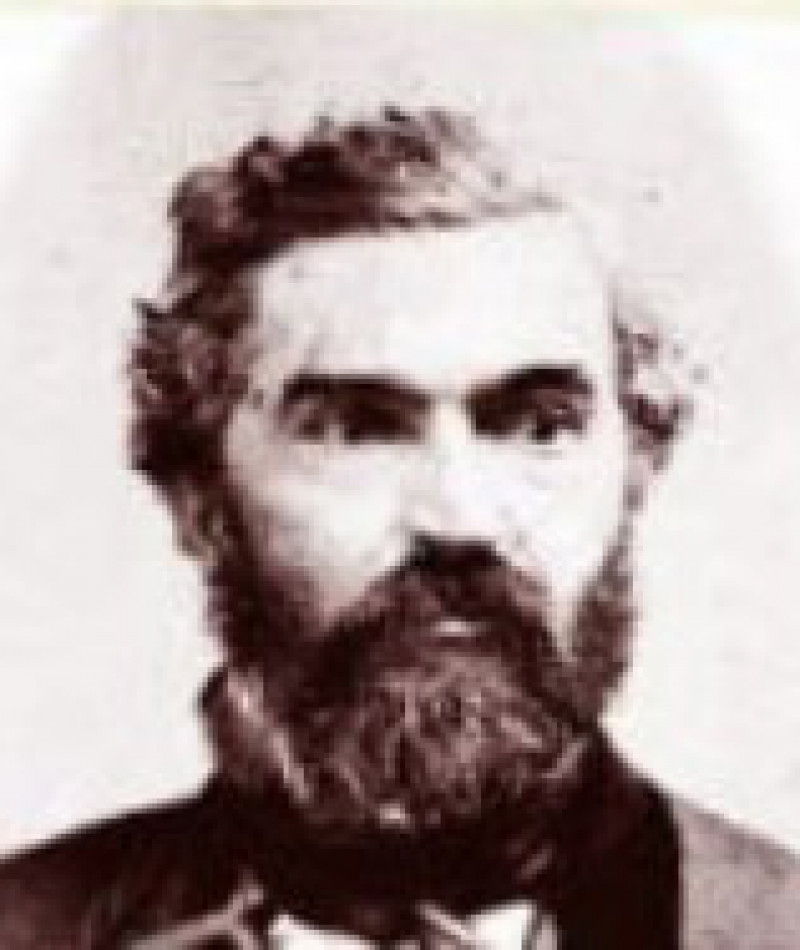
- Born: 29 May 1838; Greene County, Pennsylvania
- Died: 8 January 1914 (aged 75); Mount Pleasant, Iowa
- Burial place: Forest Home Cemetery, Mount Pleasant, Iowa
- Military career
- Allegiance: United States (Union)
- Branch: Army
- Service years: 1864-1865
- Rank: Private
- Units: K Company, Iowa 4th Cavalry
- Conflicts: Battle of Selma
- Awards: Medal of Honor

Charles A. Swan (29 May 1838 – 8 January 1914) was a private in the United States Army who was awarded the Medal of Honor for gallantry during the American Civil War. He was awarded the medal on 17 June 1865 for actions performed during the Battle of Selma on 2 April 1865.

== Personal life ==
Swan was born in Greene County, Pennsylvania on 29 May 1838 to parents Hugh B. Swan and Mary H. Stephenson. He was one of 5 children. When Swan was 16, the family moved to Mount Pleasant, where their farm would eventually become Camp Harlan, where the 4th Iowa Cavalry would be trained and stationed. He married Martha Beach Smith and fathered one child, Hugh Smith Swan. He died on 8 January 1914 in Mount Pleasant, Iowa and is buried in Forest Home Cemetery in Mount Pleasant.

== Military service ==
Swan enlisted in the Army as a private on 5 January 1864 and was assigned to Company K of the 4th Iowa Cavalry. He was captured by the Confederates on 10 June 1864 in Guntown, Mississippi but was released 5 days later. He was promoted to 6th Sergeant on 1 May 1865 and 5th Sergeant on 1 July 1865. On 2 April 1865, during the Battle of Selma, Swan captured the flag and the flag bearer of the 11th Mississippi Infantry.

Swan's Medal of Honor citation reads:

The President of the United States of America, in the name of Congress, takes pleasure in presenting the Medal of Honor to Private Charles Alexander Swan, United States Army, for extraordinary heroism on 2 April 1865, while serving with Company K, 4th Iowa Cavalry, in action at Selma, Alabama, for capture of flag (supposed to be 11th Mississippi, C.S.A.), and bearer.

— E. M. Stanton, Secretary of War

Swan was discharged from the Army on 8 August 1865 in Atlanta, Georgia. His Medal of Honor was accredited to Pennsylvania.
