= 11th Tennessee Cavalry Regiment =

Cavalry regiment in the American civil war

- Active: May 1863 to March 24, 1865
- Country: United States
- Allegiance: Union
- Branch: Cavalry
- Engagements: Battle of Johnsonville

The 11th Tennessee Cavalry Regiment was a cavalry regiment that served in the Union Army during the American Civil War. The regiment was also known as 1st East Tennessee Cavalry Battalion and 11th East Tennessee Cavalry Regiment.

== Service ==
The 11th Tennessee Cavalry was organized May through October 1863 and mustered in for a three-year enlistment under the command of Colonel Isham Young. Companies A, B, C, and D were mustered in at Camp Nelson, Kentucky, on August 15, 1863.

The regiment was attached to Willcox's Division, Left Wing, XXIII Corps, Department of the Ohio, to January 1864. District of the Clinch to April 1864. 1st Brigade, 4th Division, XXIII Corps, Department of the Ohio, to January 1865.

The 11th Tennessee Cavalry ceased to exist on March 24, 1865, when it was consolidated with the 9th Tennessee Cavalry.

== Detailed service ==
Joined DeCourcy at Crab Orchard, Ky., August 24, 1863. March to Cumberland Gap September 24-October 3. Operations about Cumberland Gap until February 1864. Mulberry Creek January 3. Tazewell January 24. Near Jonesville January 28–29. Skirmishes on Jonesville and Mulberry Roads February 12. Gibson and Wyerman's Mills on Indian Creek, and at Powell's Bridge February 22. Duty at and about Cumberland Gap guarding communications with Knoxville until January 1865. Action at Johnsonville, Tenn., November 4–5, 1864.

Records are incomplete, but the 11th Tennessee Cavalry was known to be greatly under strength, ill-equipped, and without discipline. Brigadier General Theophilus T. Garrard reported on March 15, 1864, that "the 11th Tennessee Cavalry (10 companies) 252 men for duty, no horses, are without discipline, and with their present organization of but little value."

== Commanders ==
- Colonel Isham Young

== See also ==
- List of Tennessee Civil War units
- Tennessee in the Civil War
