= 11th Attack Squadron =

11th Attack Squadron

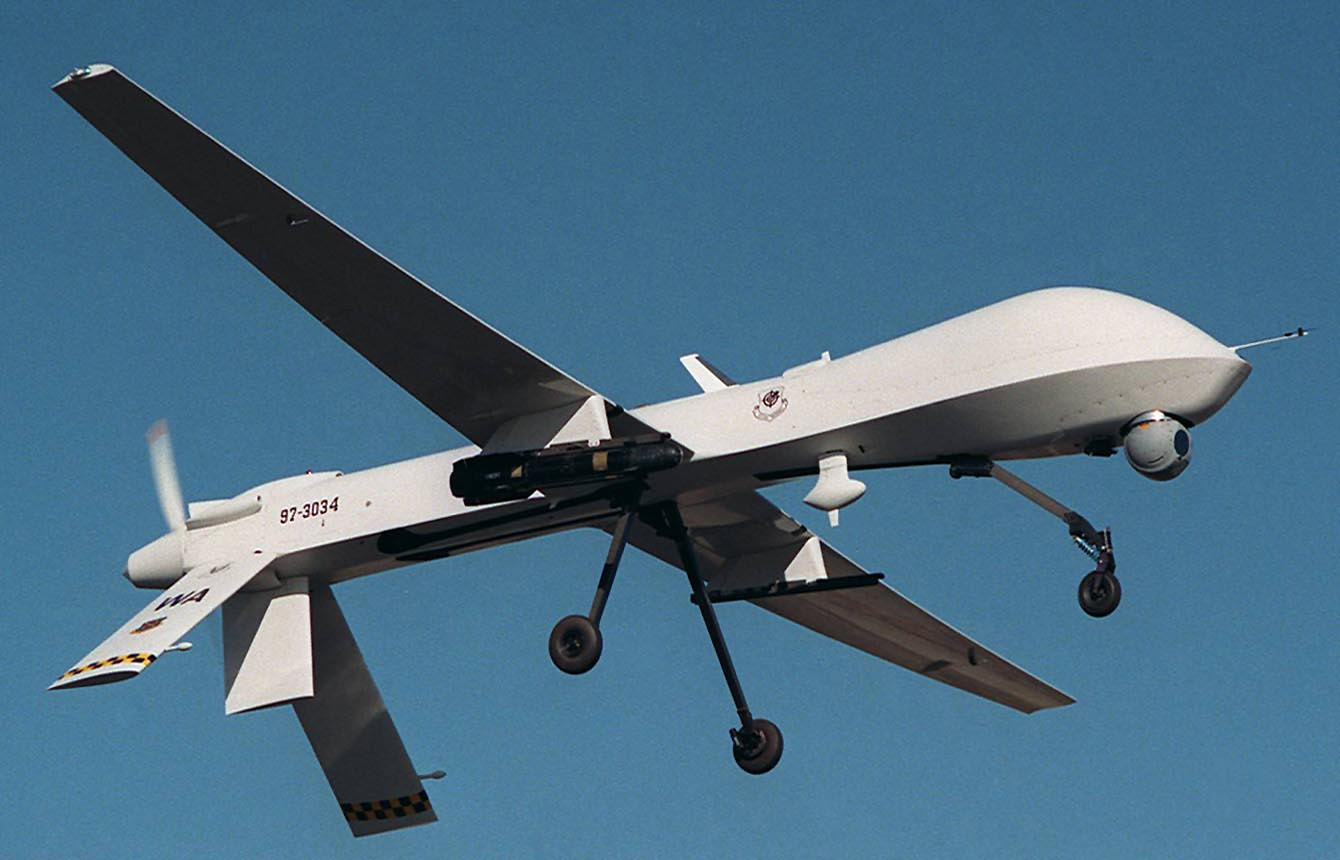
- MQ-1 Predator armed with AGM-114 Hellfire missile
- Active: 1942-1946; 1947-1949; 1953-1960; 1966-1971; 1971-1979; 1991-1994; 1995-present
- Country: United States
- Branch: United States Air Force
- Role: Aerial reconnaissance
- Part of: Air Combat Command
- Garrison/HQ: Creech Air Force Base
- Motto: We Let You Know Before You Go (1953-1966)
- Engagements: Vietnam War
- Decorations: Presidential Unit Citation; Air Force Meritorious Unit Award; Air Force Outstanding Unit Award w/Combat "V" Device; Air Force Outstanding Unit Award; Vietnamese Gallantry Cross with Palm

Commanders
- Notable commanders: LTG Royal B. Allison

Insignia
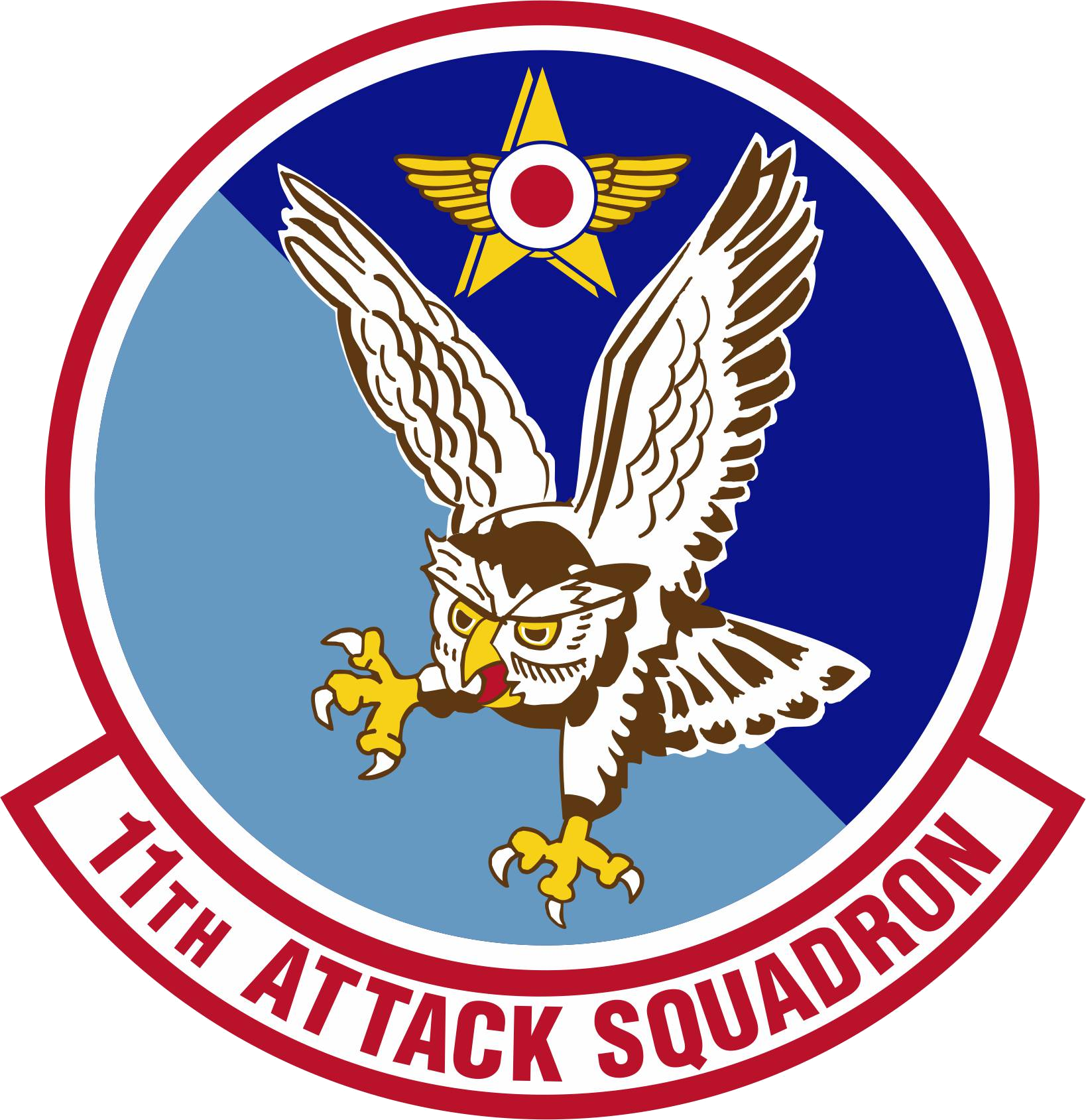
- 11th Attack Squadron emblem

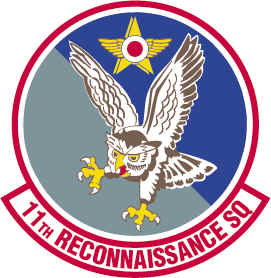
- 11th Reconnaissance Squadron emblem (approved 20 July 1966)

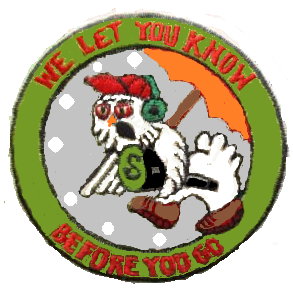
- 11th Tactical Reconnaissance Squadron emblem (approved 28 December 1953)

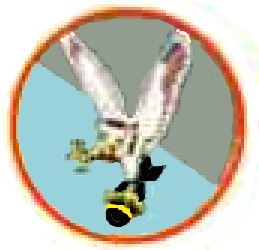
- 11th Observation Squadron emblem (approved 26 October 1942)

The 11th Attack Squadron is a United States Air Force unit assigned to the 432d Wing Air Combat Command at Creech Air Force Base near Indian Springs, Nevada. It flies General Atomics MQ-9 Reaper Unmanned aerial vehicles. In 1995 the 11th became the first Remotely Piloted Aircraft (RPA) squadron in the Air Force.

== Overview ==
The 11th Attack Squadron was the U.S. Air Force's first MQ-1B Predator formal training unit that conducts 5 basic and advanced training courses: Initial Qualification, Instructor Upgrade Training, Foreign Officer Course, Senior Officer Course, and Launch & Recovery Course. The 11th conducts intelligence, surveillance, and reconnaissance operating MQ-9 Reaper remotely piloted aircraft.

== History ==
=== World War II ===
The squadron was first activated as the 11th Observation Squadron at Wheeler-Sack Field in early 1942. It initially operated in the southeastern United States under Third Air Force flying antisubmarine patrols along the Gulf Coast after the Japanese attack on Pearl Harbor.

The unit was reassigned to Fourth Air Force in Southern California during early 1942, flying reconnaissance, mapping, artillery adjustment, bombing, dive-bombing, and strafing missions to support Army ground units in training at the Desert Training Center or on maneuvers. It trained personnel in aerial reconnaissance, medium bombardment, and fighter techniques.

With the closure of the Desert Training Center in late 1943, the unit returned to Third Air Force becoming a reconnaissance training unit for Army forces at Fort Campbell, Kentucky, Fort Polk, Louisiana, Fort Hood, Texas and Fort Bragg, North Carolina. After the war it was assigned to Shaw Field, South Carolina, and was never fully equipped or manned. The unit inactivated March 1946.

=== Cold War ===
The 11th was reactivated at Langley Field, Virginia in 1947. It was equipped with Lockheed RF-80 Shooting Stars as a photo-reconnaissance squadron. It was reassigned to Twelfth Air Force and moved to March Air Force Base, California. Budget constraints, though, resulted in the unit's inactivation in March 1949.

It was reactivated during the Korean War and equipped with Douglas RB-26 Invaders and deployed to Kimpo AFB (K-14), South Korea. Their RB-26C Invader aircraft were painted all black and flew a number of standardized intelligence-gathering missions. There were four standard missions—one that ran along the border with North Korea, another that flew up the North Korean coast on the east side, and another on the west side, and the final missions, called E (in phonetic parlance of the day, "Easy") was a long duration mission that headed down the coast of China to the Shantung Peninsula, gathering signals and electronics data from what was then called "Red China". In the mid-1950s, the unit's RB-26C Invader aircraft were transferred to the French, who used them both in France and later in Indo-China.

The squadron operated as part of Far East Air Forces after the Korean War, engaging in photographic and weather reconnaissance missions over South Korea as well as the Japanese Home Islands and the adjacent waters along the Korean peninsula and Chinese/Soviet Pacific coasts until 1960.

In 1957 the 11th Squadron received twelve Douglas RB-66C Destroyer electronic intelligence gathering planes.

=== Vietnam war ===
It was activated as a McDonnell Douglas RF-4C Phantom II reconnaissance squadron in 1966 under Tactical Air Command. The squadron deployed to Thailand shortly after formation, flying tactical reconnaissance missions primarily over North Vietnam and selected locations in Laos and Cambodia. The squadron provided much of the aerial photographic intelligence obtained during the Vietnam War, especially that from North Vietnam. In the fall of 1970 the squadron's parent wing was phased down as part of the overall American withdrawal from the Vietnam War, returned to Shaw Air Force Base, South Carolina where the unit was inactivated in early 1971.

The unit was reactivated at Davis-Monthan Air Force Base later in 1971 as a Ryan AQM-34 Firebee unmanned tactical reconnaissance drone squadron. Performed photographic reconnaissance to support tactical air and surface forces with tactical drones manufactured by Ryan Aeronautical. It used AQM-34L/M/V drones, Lockheed DC-130 Hercules launch vehicles, and Sikorsky CH-3 recovery helicopters. The group conducted follow-on testing and evaluation of the AQM-34V model drone and the initial operational testing and evaluation and developmental testing and evaluation of the DC-130H "mother ship." The unit was inactivated in 1979.

=== The 1990s and twenty-first century ===
As the 11th Air Intelligence Squadron, the squadron provided real-time intelligence support to the 11th Tactical Control Wing and Eleventh Air Force at Elmendorf AFB from 1992 to 1994. Reactivated on 29 July 1995, at Indian Springs Air Force Auxiliary Field, Nevada, under command of the 57th Operations Group, 57th Wing. In 1996 it became the first unmanned aerial vehicle (UAV) squadron in the USAF.

It provided deployable, long-endurance, aerial reconnaissance and surveillance while flying the Predator UAV, 1996–2002. It began to conduct flying training in the Predator in 2003.

In May 2016, the squadron was redesignated 11th Attack Squadron. The squadrons of the 49th Wing at Holloman Air Force Base took over the MQ-9 Reaper training role in 2010. The MQ-1 Predator was retired from United States Air Force service on 9 March 2018.

=== Lineage ===
- Constituted as the 11th Observation Squadron (Medium) on 5 February 1942
  - Activated on 2 March 1942
  - Redesignated 11th Observation Squadron on 4 July 1942
  - Redesignated 11th Reconnaissance Squadron (Fighter) on 2 April 1943
  - Redesignated 11th Tactical Reconnaissance Squadron on 11 August 1943
  - Redesignated 11th Reconnaissance Squadron, Night Photographic on 25 January 1946
  - Inactivated on 31 March 1946
- Activated on 19 May 1947
  - Redesignated 11th Tactical Reconnaissance Squadron, Night Photographic on 14 June 1948
  - Inactivated on 28 March 1949
- Redesignated 11th Tactical Reconnaissance Squadron on 12 August 1953
  - Activated on 18 September 1953
  - Redesignated 11th Tactical Reconnaissance Squadron, Electronics and Weather on 25 November 1953
  - Discontinued and inactivated on 8 March 1960
- Redesignated 11th Tactical Reconnaissance Squadron, Photo-Jet and activated on 3 November 1965 (not organized)
  - Organized on 1 April 1966
  - Redesignated 11th Tactical Reconnaissance Squadron on 1 October 1966
  - Inactivated on 24 January 1971
- Redesignated 11th Tactical Drone Squadron on 18 May 1971
  - Activated on 1 July 1971
  - Inactivated on 1 April 1979
- Redesignated 11th Tactical Intelligence Squadron on 26 June 1991
  - Activated on 15 July 1991
- Redesignated 11th Air Intelligence Squadron on 27 January 1992
  - Inactivated on 1 July 1994
- Redesignated 11th Reconnaissance Squadron on 1 July 1995
  - Activated on 29 July 1995
  - Redesignated 11th Attack Squadron on 15 May 2016

=== Assignments ===
- Air Force Combat Command, 2 March 1942
- Army Air Forces, 9 March 1942
- 74th Observation Group (later 74th Reconnaissance Group, 74th Tactical Reconnaissance Group), 21 March 1942
- XIX Tactical Air Command, 7 November 1945 (attached to 69th Reconnaissance Group)
- First Air Force, 27 February 1946
- Tactical Air Command, 21 March 1946
- 67th Reconnaissance Group, 28 March 1946 – 31 March 1946
- 67th Reconnaissance Group (later 67th Tactical Reconnaissance Group), 19 May 1947 – 28 March 1949
- 67th Tactical Reconnaissance Group, 18 September 1953 (attached to 67th Tactical Reconnaissance Wing, 1 June - 30 Nov 1954 and after 1 July 1957)
- 67th Tactical Reconnaissance Wing, 1 October 1957 – 8 Marck 1960
- Tactical Air Command, 3 November 1965 (not organized)
- 67th Tactical Reconnaissance Wing, 1 April 1966
- 432d Tactical Reconnaissance Wing, 25 October 1966
- Tactical Air Command, 10 Nov 1970 – 24 January 1971
- 355th Tactical Fighter Wing, 1 July 1971
- 432d Tactical Drone Group, 1 July 1976 – 1 April 1979
- Eleventh Air Force, 15 July 1991
- 11th Operations Group, 27 January 1992 – 1 July 1994
- 57th Operations Group, 29 July 1995
- 432d Operations Group, 1 May 2007 – present

=== Stations ===
- Wheeler-Sack Field, New York, 2 Mar 1942
- DeRidder Army Air Base, Louisiana, 6 May 1942
- Esler Field, Louisiana, 15 December 1942
- Desert Center Army Air Field, California, 29 December 1942
  - Deployed to Camp Laguna, Arizona, 27 June - July 1943
- Morris Field, North Carolina, 24 September 1943
- Camp Campbell Army Air Field, Kentucky, 6 November 1943
  - Deployed to Bowling Green Airport, Kentucky, 9 December 1943 – 24 March 1944
- Pounds Field, Texas, 17 April 1944
- Lafayette Airport, Louisiana, 12 July 1944
- Stuttgart Army Air Field, Arkansas, 7 February 1945
- Brooks Field, Texas, 8 December 1945
- Shaw Field, South Carolina, 27 February 1946 – 31 March 1946
- Langley Field, Virginia, 19 May 1947
- March Field (later March Air Force Base), California, 1 September 1947 – 28 March 1949
- Kimpo Air Base, South Korea, 18 September 1953
- Itami Air Base, Japan, 7 December 1954
- Yokota Air Base, Japan, 15 July 1957 – 8 March 1960
- Mountain Home Air Force Base, ID, 1 April 1966
- Udorn Royal Thai Air Force Base, Thailand, 25 Oct 1966 – 5 November 1970
- Shaw Air Force Base, South Carolina, 10 November 1970 – 24 January 1971
- Davis-Monthan Air Force Base, Arizona, 1 July 1971 – 1 April 1979
- Elmendorf Air Force Base, Alaska, 15 July 1991 – 1 July 1994
- Indian Springs Air Force Auxiliary Field (later Creech Air Force Base), Nevada, 29 July 1995 – present

=== Aircraft ===
- Included O-52, L-4 Grasshopper and P-43 Lancer during period 1942–1943
- P-39 Airacobra, 1943
- P-40 Warhawk, 1943–1944
- B-25/F-10 Mitchell, 1944–1945
- L-5 Sentinel, 1944–1945
- P-51/F-6 Mustang, 1945–1946
- A-26 Invader, 1945–1946
- Douglas FA-(later, RB-)26 Invader, 1947–1949
- Douglas RB/WB-26 Invader, 1953–1957
- SC-47 Skytrain, 1957
- RB/WB-66 Destroyer, 1957–1960
- RF-4C Phantom II, 1967–1970
- DC/RC-130 Hercules, 1971–1979
- AQM-34 Firebee, 1971–1979
- CH-3, 1972–1979
- BQM-34 Firebee, 1974–1975
- Q/MQ-1 Predator, 1996 – 2018
