= 11th Brigade =

11th Brigade may refer to:

== Australia ==
- 11th Brigade (Australia)

== Belarus ==
- 11th Guards Berlin-Carpathian Mechanized Brigade

== Canada ==
- 11th Canadian Infantry Brigade

== China ==
- 11th Armored Brigade (People's Republic of China)

== France ==
- 11th Parachute Brigade (France)

== Hungary ==
- 11th Armored Hajduk Brigade "István Bocskai"
- 11th Infantry Brigade (Hungary)

== India ==
- 11th Cavalry Brigade (British Indian Army)
- 11th Indian Brigade
- 11th Indian Cavalry Brigade
- 11th Indian Infantry Brigade

== Italy ==
- 11th Carabinieri Mechanized Brigade

== Japan ==
- 11th Brigade (Japan)
- 11th Independent Mixed Brigade (Imperial Japanese Army)

== Netherlands ==
- 11th Airmobile Brigade (Netherlands)

== Russia ==
- 11th Guards Air Assault Brigade

== Soviet Union ==
- 11th Guards Berlin-Carpathian Mechanized Brigade
- 11th Rocket Brigade

== Spain ==
- XI International Brigade

== Ukraine ==
- 11th Anti-aircraft Missile Brigade (Ukraine)
- 11th Army Aviation Brigade (Ukraine)
- 11th Artillery Brigade (Ukraine)
- 11th Public Order Brigade (Ukraine)

== United Kingdom ==
- 11 Brigade (United Kingdom)
- 11th Armoured Brigade (United Kingdom)
- 11th Infantry Brigade (United Kingdom)
- 11th Mounted Brigade (United Kingdom)
- 11th Reserve Brigade
- 11th Signal and West Midlands Brigade

=== Artillery units ===
- 11th Brigade Royal Field Artillery
- 11th (Devon) Army Brigade, Royal Field Artillery
- 11th (Honourable Artillery Company and City of London Yeomanry) Brigade, Royal Horse Artillery
- XI Brigade, Royal Horse Artillery

== United States ==
- 11th Air Defense Artillery Brigade (United States)
- 11th Corps Signal Brigade (United States)
- 11th Expeditionary Combat Aviation Brigade
- 11th Infantry Brigade (United States)
- 11th Military Police Brigade (United States)

== See also ==
- 11th Division (disambiguation)
- 11th Regiment (disambiguation)
