= Sitovo, Silistra Province =

Sitovo Ситово
- Location of Sitovo
- Coordinates: 44°01′N 27°01′E
- Country: Bulgaria
- Provinces (Oblast): Silistra

Government
  - Mayor: Nikolay Nedelchev

Population (2008)
  - Total: 899
- Time zone: UTC+2 (EET)
  - Summer (DST): UTC+3 (EEST)
- Postal Code: 7583
- Area code: 08563

Sitovo (Bulgarian: Ситово, pronounced [ˈsitovo]; Romanian: Doimușlar; Turkish: Doymuşlar) is a village in northeastern Bulgaria, part of Silistra Province. It is the administrative centre of Sitovo Municipality, which lies in the central part of Silistra Province, 25 kilometres west of the provincial capital of Silistra, in the historical region of Southern Dobruja.

== Municipality ==
Sitovo municipality covers an area of 271 square kilometres and includes the following 12 places:

- Bosna
- Dobrotitsa
- Garvan
- Irnik
- Iskra
- Lyuben
- Nova Popina
- Polyana
- Popina
- Sitovo
- Slatina
- Yastrebna
