= Otto Adolf Weismann von Weißenstein =

Russian general (1726–1773)

Baron Otto Adolf Weismann von Weißenstein
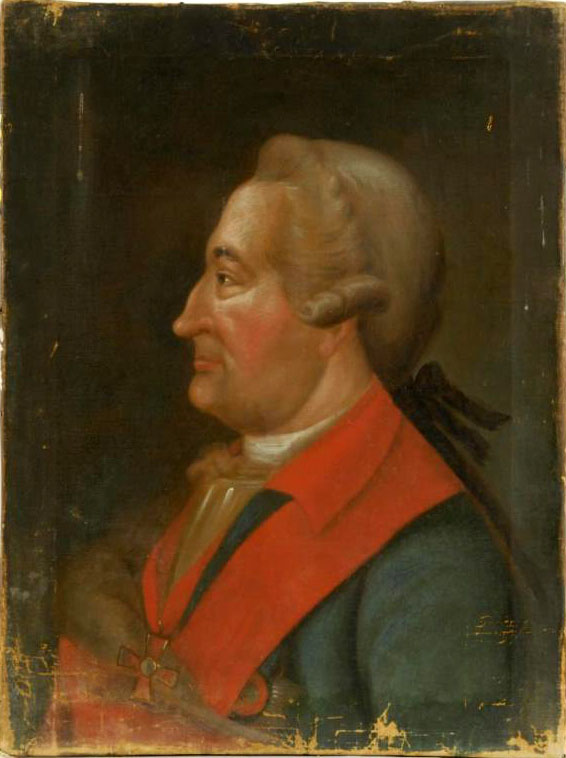
- Portrait by an unknown author
- Born: 31 December [O.S. 20 Dec.] 1726; Riga Governorate, Russia
- Died: 3 July [O.S. 22 June] 1773 (46); Kaynardzha, Ottoman Empire
- Cause of death: Battle of Küçük Kaynarca
- Military career
- Allegiance: Russia
- Branch: Imperial Russian Army
- Service years: 1744–1773
- Rank: Major general
- Nickname: Achilles
- Commands: 13th Belozersk Infantry Regiment
- Conflicts: Seven Years' War; Battle of Gross-Jägersdorf (WIA); Battle of Zorndorf (WIA); War of the Bar Confederation; Russo-Turkish War; Battle of Larga; Battle of Kagul; Battle of Karasu; Combat of Gurobal; Siege of Silistra; Battle of Küçük Kaynarca †
- Awards: 2nd and 3rd orders of Saint George; Order of Saint Alexander Nevsky

Baron Otto Adolf Weismann von Weißenstein (1726–1773; also referred to as Weismann von Weissenstein or Weismann (Note: Russian: Отто-Адольф Вейсман фон-Вейсенштейн, romanized: Otto-Adol'f Veysman fon-Veysenšteyn)) was a Russian nobleman and major general from Livonia of Baltic-German descent. He was considered one of the Russian Empress Catherine's finest generals alongside Alexander Suvorov and Pyotr Rumyantsev.

Weismann, according to the accounts of his contemporaries, had great military talent and enjoyed the trust and love of troops; his name was the most popular in Rumyantsev's army. Because of his courage, speed of action and coup d'œil, he had much in common with Suvorov; which Rumyantsev acknowledged. Suvorov regarded Weismann as one of the greatest Generals of Catherine's century. In his correspondence, while talking about the death of Weismann during Rumyantsev's campaign, he wrote: "Weismann was gone—I was left alone."

== Career ==
In 1744, he enlisted in the Imperial Russian Army as a private, his unit was called up for the Seven Years' War. He was wounded twice, first at the Battle of Gross-Jägersdorf and then at the Battle of Zorndorf.

In 1763, he was the colonel and in 1768, the commander of the 13th Belozersk Infantry Regiment, which he commanded during the Bar Confederation in 1768. In 1769, pursuing one of their detachments, Weismann got carried away, crossed the Ottoman border with Russia and burned the city of Balta, now located in modern Ukraine. This served as an external reason for Turkey, instigated by France, to declare war on Russia.

=== Russo-Turkish War ===
In the war, Weismann displayed the courage, energy and skill of a military commander, and was promoted to the rank of major general. For distinction at the battles of Larga and Kagul, he was awarded the orders of Saints George (3rd degree) and Alexander Nevsky. At the head of a detachment which had the task of monitoring the fortress of Isaccea, with a bold and sudden manoeuvre, he forced the Turks to vacate it.

In 1771, he made a number of brave searches beyond the Danube, where he once captured 170 cannons and destroyed large supplies of food. He was awarded the Order of St. George, 2nd degree, and received a division. The swiftness of his actions earned him the nickname "Achilles" in the Russian army.

In 1773, Weismann was appointed to cross the Danube at Izmail with his division, go up the right bank to Gurobal, 32 km (20 mi) from Silistra/Silistria, and to there provide cover for the crossing of the main forces of Pyotr Rumyantsev's army. Weismann executed this maneuver, defeated at Karasu an 8,000-strong Turkish detachment observing a course of the river, and then through Hîrșova moved to Gurobal. There he attacked the 10,000-strong corps of Osman Pasha at their flank and defeated them. This ensured that the transfer of the army across the Danube could be made unhindered. However, during its further movement towards Silistra, Weismann had to hand over his division to Stupishin, the senior among the lieutenant generals, and was appointed head of the vanguard.

Osman Pasha, who was defending Silistra, tried to delay the Russian movement and with 30,000 troops took a favourable position 5.3 km (3.3 mi) below the fortress. Relying on it, he attacked the vanguard with cavalry, but Weismann immediately formed his 3 battalions into infantry squares and repelled all attacks, thus giving time for the cavalry to arrive and drive the Ottomans away. Pursuing them, Weismann reached the fortress, where his appearance caused great confusion. Weismann did not dare, however, to take advantage of the confusion and use his small forces to take Silistra, as the main Russian forces were still moving through 2 passes.

At the beginning of the siege of Silistra, Weismann was instructed, together with the detachments of Lieutenant Generals Potemkin, Igelström and Stupishin, to take the trenches on the heights in front of Silistra and thus prevent a bombardment of the fort. The attack was made on 29 June [O.S. 18 June] 1773 early in the morning, but only Weismann succeeded. He bypassed the trenches from the rear and drove the Turks out of them, while Potemkin and Igelström's columns failed. Weismann held the trenches occupied by him the whole day and cleared them at night on the orders of Rumyantsev, after news come in of Numan Pasha moving with a 20,000-strong corps from Shumen/Shumla to reinforce Silistra. Having withdrawn his troops from Silistra, Rumyantsev instructed Weismann to detain Numan Pasha. Weismann moved against him on 2 July (O. S. 21 June) with a detachment of 5,000 men, and on the morning of 3 July (O.S. 22 June), attacked him at Küçük Kaynarca. A hard-fought battle ensued; the janissaries broke through the square where Weismann himself was, and one of them shot him with a pistol. The bullet pierced his left arm and heart. As he fell, he allegedly only managed to say: "Don't tell people." But his death was noticed by his troops, who fiercely repulsed the Turkish onslaught, drove them from their position and massacred them, giving no mercy even to the prisoners.

Rumyantsev replaced Weismann with Suvorov on the front lines of the army at Hîrșova when it withdrew behind the Danube.

== Citations ==
- Velichko, Konstantin I.; Novitsky, Vasily F.; Schwarz, Alexey V. von; Apushkin, Vladimir A.; Schoultz, Gustav K. von (1911). "ВЕЙСМАНЪ, бар., фонъ Вейсенштейнъ, Отто-Адольфъ" [Weismann, baron, von Weißenstein, Otto Adolf]. Военная энциклопедия (in Russian). Vol. 5: Бомбарда – Верещагин. Moscow: Ivan Sytin. pp. 279–280.
- Arsenyev, Konstantin; Petrushevsky, Fyodor (1892). "Вейсманъ фонъ-Вейсенштейнъ" [Weismann von Weißenstein]. Brockhaus and Efron Encyclopedic Dictionary (in Russian). Vol. 10: Вальтер – Венути. Friedrich A. Brockhaus (Leipzig), Ilya A. Efron (Saint Petersburg). p. 728.
