= Glavinitsa (disambiguation) =

Glavinitsa may refer to:

- Glavinitsa, a town in the district of Silistra, Bulgaria;
- Glavinitsa, municipality in district Silistra, Bulgaria;
- Glavinitsa, a village in the district of Pazardzhik, Bulgaria;
- Glavinica or 'Glavinitsa' , a medieval town in the historical-geographical region of Kutmichevitsa, today's southern Albania;
