= Dulovo Municipality =

Dulovo Municipality Община Дулово
- Municipality
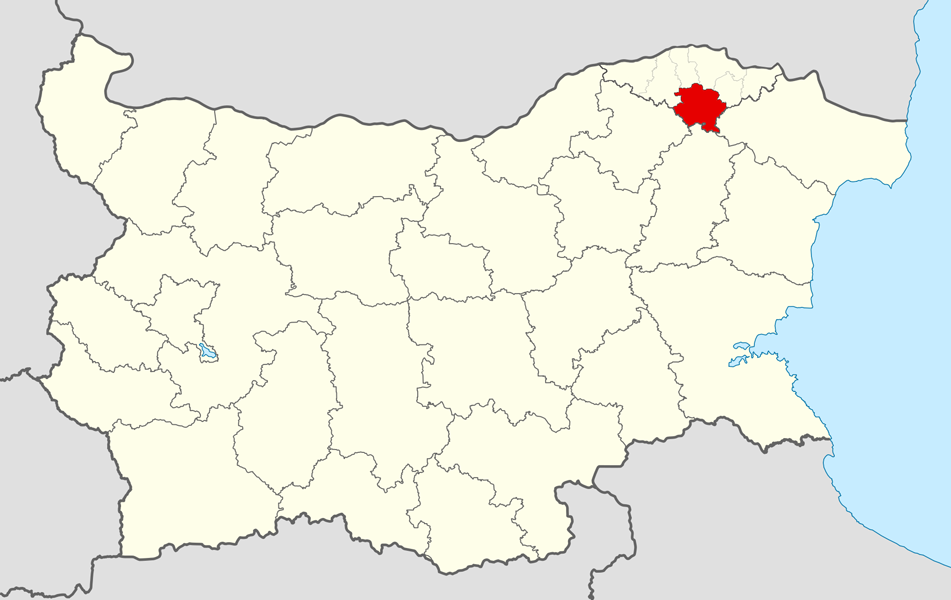
- Dulovo Municipality within Bulgaria and Silistra Province.
- Coordinates: 43°48′N 27°6′E
- Country: Bulgaria
- Province (Oblast): Silistra
- Admin. centre (Obshtinski tsentar): Dulovo

Area
  - Total: 566.33 km^{2} (218.66 sq mi)

Population (December 2009)
  - Total: 28,860
  - Density: 50.96/km^{2} (132.0/sq mi)
- Time zone: UTC+2 (EET)
  - Summer (DST): UTC+3 (EEST)

Dulovo Municipality (Bulgarian: Община Дулово) is a municipality (obshtina) in Silistra Province, Northeastern Bulgaria, located in the Danubian Plain, in the area of the South Dobrudzha geographical region, about 25 km south of Danube river. It is named after its administrative centre – the town of Dulovo.

The municipality embraces a territory of 566.33 km^{2} with a population of 28,860 inhabitants, as of December 2009.

The main road I-7 crosses the area from north to south, connecting the province centre of Silistra with the city of Shumen and the eastern operating part of Hemus motorway.

== Settlements ==
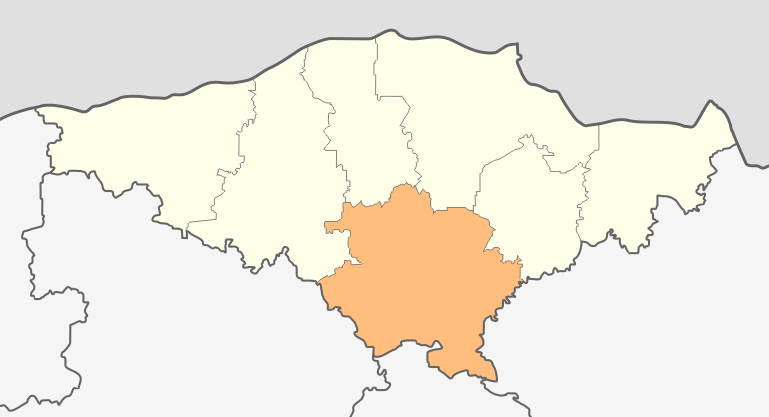
Dulovo Municipality within Silistra Province

Dulovo Municipality includes the following 27 places (towns are shown in bold):

Town/Village	Cyrillic	Population (December 2009)
**Dulovo**	**Дулово**	6,621
Boil	Боил	954
Cherkovna	Черковна	599
Chernolik	Чернолик	1,425
Chernik	Черник	2,299
Dolets	Долец	533
Grancharovo	Грънчарово	505
Kozyak	Козяк	362
Kolobar	Колобър	532
Mezhden	Межден	691
Oven	Овен	1,011
Okorsh	Окорш	1,617
Oreshene	Орешене	399
Paisievo	Паисиево	870
Polkovnik Taslakovo	Полковник Таслаково	435
Poroyno	Поройно	1,248
Pravda	Правда	1,664
Prohlada	Прохлада	250
Razdel	Раздел	624
Ruyno	Руйно	857
Sekulovo	Секулово	920
Skala	Скала	212
Vodno	Водно	921
Vokil	Вокил	1,227
Varbino	Върбино	100
Yarebitsa	Яребица	1,357
Zlatoklas	Златоклас	627
Total		28,860

== Demography ==
The following table shows the change of the population during the last four decades. Since 1992 Dulovo Municipality has comprised the former municipality of Okorsh and the numbers in the table reflect this unification.

Dulovo Municipality
Year	1975	1985	1992	2001	2005	2007	2009	2011
Population	23,253	23,426	33,509	30,591	29,677	29,200	28,860	...
Sources: Census 2001, Census 2011, „pop-stat.mashke.org“,

=== Ethnic groups ===
Ethnic Turks constitute the majority of the population of Dulovo, followed by Bulgarians and Roma people.

Ethnic groups in the municipality of Dulovo (2011 census)
Ethnic group	Percentage
Bulgarians	17.8%
Turks	70.4%
Roma	9.2%
others and indefinable	2.6%

=== Religious composition ===
According to the latest Bulgarian census of 2011, the religious composition, among those who answered the optional question on religious identification, was the following:

Religious composition of Dulovo Municipality
Orthodox Christianity	18.7%
Catholicism	0.1%
Protestantism	0.1%
Islam	75.9%
No religion	0.9%
Prefer not to answer, others and indefinable	4.3%

Most inhabitants are Muslim, followed by Christians.

=== Demographic indicators ===
The municipality of Dulovo has a relatively good demographic structure compared to other areas in Bulgaria, although the situation is becoming worse.

	Population	Live births	Deaths	Natural growth	Birth rate (‰)	Death rate (‰)	Natural growth rate (‰)
2000	32,880	337	431	−94	10.2	13.1	−2.9
2001	30,443	346	430	−84	11.4	14.1	−2.8
2002	30,150	297	420	−123	9.9	13.9	−4.1
2003	30,079	349	379	−30	11.6	12.6	−1.0
2004	29,893	326	392	−66	10.9	13.1	−2.2
2005	29,677	298	407	−109	10.0	13.7	−3.7
2006	29,473	304	435	−131	10.3	14.8	−4.4
2007	29,200	304	405	−101	10.4	13.9	−3.5
2008	28,956	344	407	−63	11.9	14.1	−2.2
2009	28,860	366	372	−6	12.7	12.9	−0.2
2010	28,634	333	382	−49	11.6	13.3	−1.7
2011	28,259	282	376	−94	10.0	13.2	−3.3
2012	28,215	329	399	−70	11.7	14.1	−2.5
2013	28,077	267	329	−62	9.5	11.7	−2.2
2014	27,963	302	409	−107	10.8	14.6	−3.8
2015	27,857	305	395	−90	10.9	14.2	−3.2
2016	27,643	282	398	−116	10.2	14.4	−4.2
2017	27,506	281	365	−84	10.2	13.3	−3.1
2018	27,403	248	410	-162	9.1	15.0	-5.9

== See also ==
- Provinces of Bulgaria
- Municipalities of Bulgaria
- List of cities and towns in Bulgaria
