= Posev =

Posev may refer to:

- Posev (village), village in Kaynardzha Municipality, Bulgaria
- Posev (publisher), Russian emigre publisher set by National Alliance of Russian Solidarists in West Germany
- Posev (magazine), Russian emigre magazine of National Alliance of Russian Solidarists
- Posev (band), Russian rock band formed by Yegor Letov, predecessor to Grazhdanskaya Oborona
