= Sitovo Municipality =

Sitovo Municipality Община Ситово
- Municipality
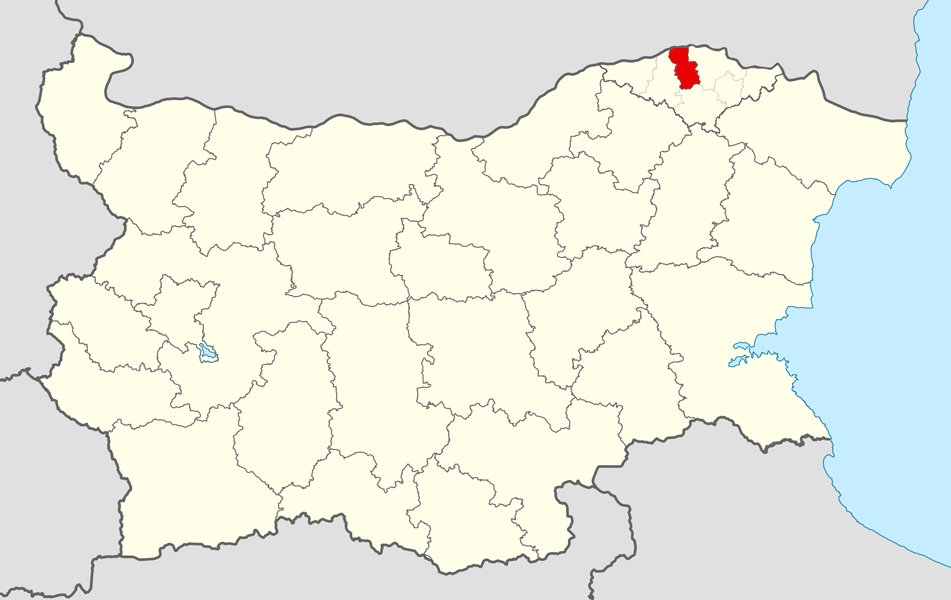
- Sitovo Municipality within Bulgaria and Silistra Province.
- Coordinates: 44°1′N 26°59′E
- Country: Bulgaria
- Province (Oblast): Silistra
- Admin. centre (Obshtinski tsentar): Sitovo

Area
  - Total: 270.97 km^{2} (104.62 sq mi)

Population (December 2009)
  - Total: 5,810
  - Density: 21.4/km^{2} (55.5/sq mi)
- Time zone: UTC+2 (EET)
  - Summer (DST): UTC+3 (EEST)

Sitovo Municipality (Bulgarian: Община Ситово) is a small municipality (obshtina) in Silistra Province, Northeastern Bulgaria, located along the right bank of Danube river in the Danubian Plain in the area of the South Dobrudzha geographical region. It is named after its administrative centre - the village of Sitovo.

The municipality embraces a territory of 270.97 km^{2} (104.62 sq mi) with a population of 5,810 inhabitants, as of December 2009.

The main road II-21 crosses the area centrally, from east to west, connecting the province centre of Silistra with the city of Ruse.

== Settlements ==
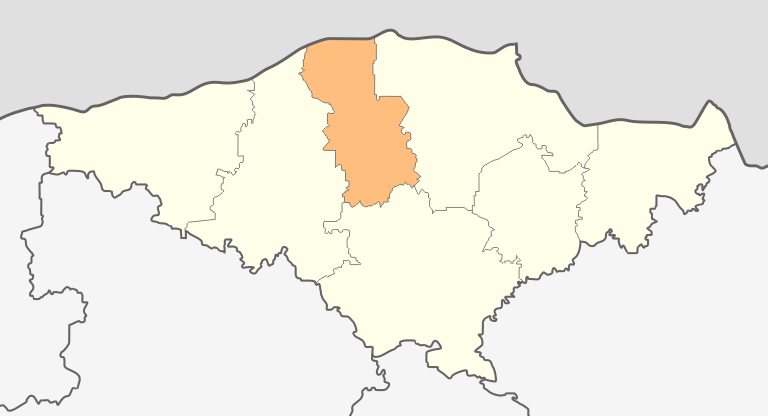
Sitovo Municipality within Silistra Province

Sitovo Municipality includes the following 12 places all of them villages:

Town/Village	Cyrillic	Population (December 2009)
Sitovo	Ситово	847
Bosna	Босна	371
Dobrotitsa	Добротица	434
Garvan	Гарван	421
Irnik	Ирник	104
Iskra	Искра	1,856
Lyuben	Любен	654
Nova Popina	Нова Попина	88
Polyan	Поляна	176
Popina	Попина	701
Slatina	Слатина	132
Yastrebna	Ястребна	26
Total		5,810

== Demography ==
The following table shows the change of the population during the last four decades.

Sitovo Municipality
Year	1975	1985	1992	2001	2005	2007	2009	2011
Population	10,829	9,035	7,554	6,856	6,356	6,080	5,810	...
Sources: Census 2001, Census 2011, „pop-stat.mashke.org“,

=== Ethnic groups ===
Ethnic Bulgarians constitute the plurality in Sitovo Municipality. Turks form the second largest ethnic group and Roma people form the third largest ethnic group.

Ethnic groups in Sitovo Municipality (2011 census)
Ethnic group	Percentage
Bulgarians	49.8%
Turks	39.6%
Roma	7.4%
others and indefinable	3.2%

==== Religion ====
According to the latest Bulgarian census of 2011, the religious composition, among those who answered the optional question on religious identification, was the following:

Religious composition of Sitovo Municipality
Orthodox Christianity	43.8%
Catholicism	0.2%
Protestantism	0.3%
Islam	49.0%
No religion	3.2%
Prefer not to answer, others and indefinable	3.5%

Most Bulgarians are Orthodox Christians, while most Turks and Roma people are Muslim.

== See also ==
- Provinces of Bulgaria
- Municipalities of Bulgaria
- List of cities and towns in Bulgaria
