= Glavinitsa =

Place in Silistra, Bulgaria

Glavinitsa Главиница
- Location of Glavinitsa
- Coordinates: 43°55′N 26°50′E
- Country: Bulgaria
- Provinces (Oblast): Silistra

Government
  - Mayor: Nasuf Nasuf
- Elevation: 150 m (490 ft)

Population (December 2018)
  - Total: ▼1,341
- Time zone: UTC+2 (EET)
  - Summer (DST): UTC+3 (EEST)
- Postal Code: 7630
- Area code: 08581

Glavinitsa (Bulgarian: Главиница, pronounced [ɡɫɐˈvinit͡sɐ]; also transliterated Glavinica or Glavinitza) is a town in northeastern Bulgaria, part of Silistra Province. It is the administrative centre of Glavinitsa Municipality, which lies in the southwestern part of Silistra Province, in the historical region of Southern Dobruja. As of December 2009, the town had a population of 1,928.

Glavinitsa is located in the eastern Danubian Plain, on the road between Dulovo and Tutrakan. Its old name (until 1942) was Asvatköy. Glavinitsa was proclaimed a town on 5 September 1984.

Glavinitsa Peak on Fallières Coast in Antarctica is named after the village.

== Population ==
As of December 2018, the town of Glavinitsa has a dwindling population of 1,341 people, down from its peak of 2,583 people in 1985. The municipality of Glavinitsa has 9,897 inhabitants at the same time.

The town of Glavinitsa has a mixed population, with ethnic Bulgarians constituting 64% of the population, followed by ethnic Bulgaria with 29% and Romani people with 7%. Orthodox Christianity is the largest faith, followed by Islam.

== Municipality ==
Glavinitsa municipality includes the following 23 places:

- Bashtino
- Bogdantsi
- Chernogor
- Dichevo
- Dolno Ryahovo
- Glavinitsa
- Kalugerene
- Kolarovo
- Kosara
- Listets
- Malak Preslavets
- Nozharevo
- Osen
- Padina
- Podles
- Sokol
- Stefan Karadzha
- Suhodol
- Valkan
- Zafirovo
- Zaritsa
- Zebil
- Zvenimir

The population consists mostly of Bulgarians and Turks. There are 5 churches, 3 chapels and 17 mosques.
