= Pyotr Volkonsky =

Russian Field Marshal (1776-1852)

General Field Marshal, His Serene Highness Pyotr Mikhailovich Volkonsky
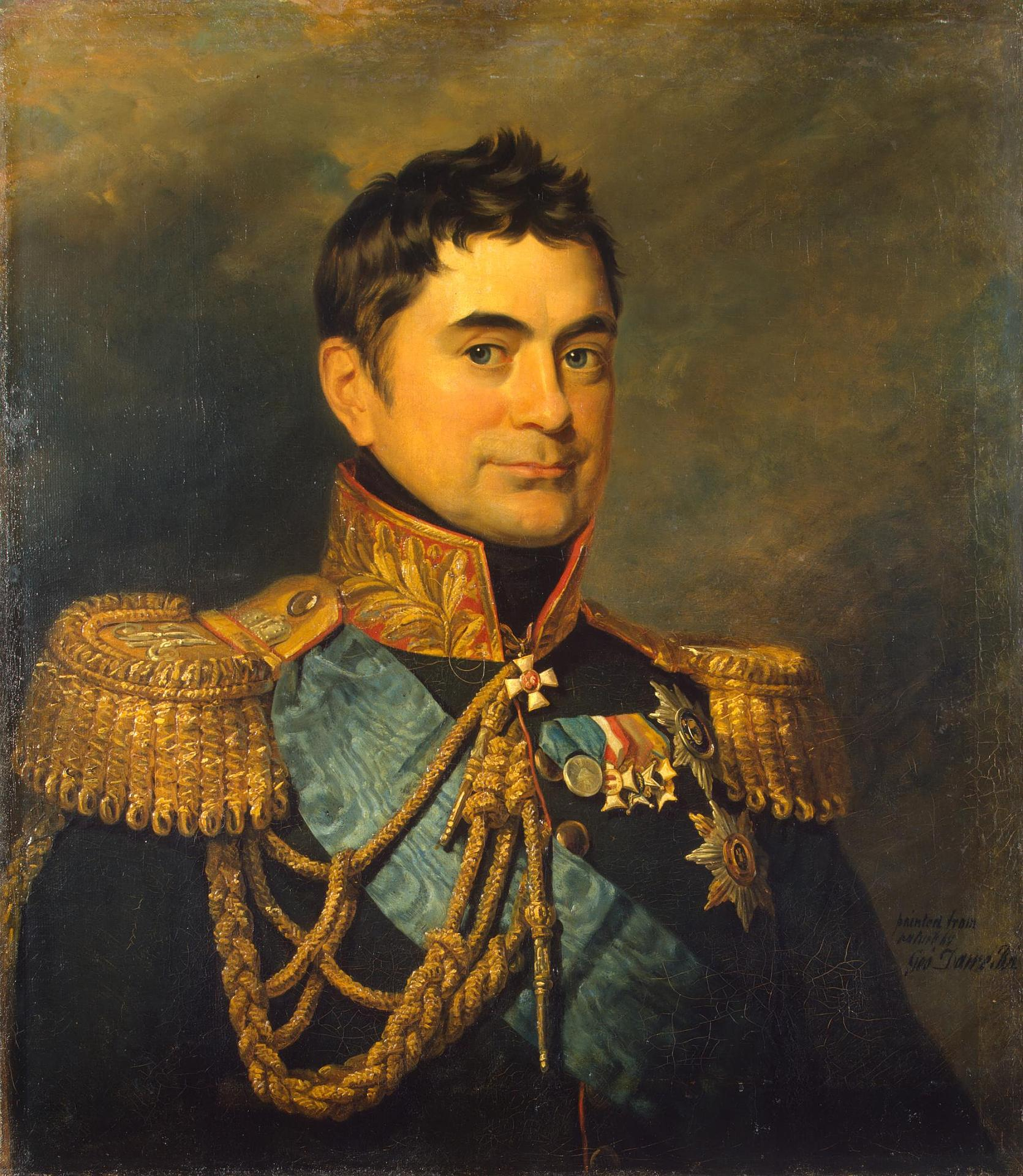
- Portrait by George Dawe, c. 1823

Minister of Imperial Court and Properties
- In office 1826–1852

Personal details
- Born: 6 May 1776 St. Petersburg, Russian Empire
- Died: 8 September 1852 (aged 76) Peterhof, St. Petersburg Governorate, Russian Empire
- Awards: Order of St. Andrew; Order of St. George

Military service
- Allegiance: Russian Empire
- Branch/service: Imperial Russian Army
- Rank: Field marshal
- Unit: Belozersk Infantry Regiment
- Commands: Chief of the General Staff
- Battles/wars: Napoleonic Wars; War of the Third Coalition; Battle of Austerlitz; French invasion of Russia; Battle of Smolensk; Battle of Borodino; Battle of Tarutino; Battle of Maloyaroslavets; War of the Sixth Coalition; Battle of Lützen; Battle of Dresden; Battle of Leipzig; Battle of Hanau

Prince Pyotr Mikhailovich Volkonsky (Russian: Пётр Миха́йлович Волко́нский, romanized: Pyotr Mikhaylovich Volkonskiy; 6 May [O.S. 25 April] 1776 – 8 September [O.S. 27 August] 1852) was an Imperial Russian military commander, General-Field Marshal (1843), Adjutant General to Alexander I, member of the State Council (1821).

== Biography ==
Pyotr Volkonsky was born in St. Petersburg in 1776. Volkonsky participated in the plot to remove Paul I from the throne and became one of the closest advisors to Alexander I. On the day of his baptism, he was enlisted as a sergeant in the Preobrazhensky Life Guards Regiment, from which he was transferred as a non-commissioned officer to the Life Guards Cavalry Regiment. He entered military service as a warrant officer in the Life Guards Cavalry Regiment (March 10, 1783). Transferred to the Semenovsky Regiment (January 13, 1784). Appointed ensign (January 1, 1793), junior lieutenant (January 1, 1794), lieutenant (November 11, 1796), and staff captain (April 22, 1796). Adjutant to Grand Duke Alexander I (November 7, 1797). Soon after Alexander I ascended the throne, he was made assistant chief of the Military Field Office of His Imperial Majesty, which at that time centralized all military management in the state. Captain (1799), colonel (May 27, 1800). Awarded the rank of major general with appointment as general-adjutant (September 15, 1801).

In the Third Coalition, he served as duty general and general quartermaster first in the army of F. W. Buxhoeveden (September 1805), and then in Mikhail Kutuzov's army (October 1805). He distinguished himself in the Battle of Austerlitz when he seized the standard of the Fanagoria Regiment, striking at the enemy that was attacking Kamensky's brigade, thereby throwing the opponent into confusion; during the counterattack, two cannons were recaptured. For this battle, he was awarded the Order of Saint George, 3rd class. After the Treaty of Tilsit, he was sent to France to study the organization of the French army and its general staff. Upon his return, he was appointed manager of the Suite of His Imperial Majesty for quartermaster affairs (1810), and from that time on, P. M. Volkonsky became one of the leading figures in the Russian army.

Prince Pyotr Volkonsky is considered the founder of the Russian General Staff: in 1810, he conducted a thorough analysis of all recent wars involving Russia and contemporary European wars, concluding that a unified structure for military planning and management (which had been dismantled by Paul I in 1796) needed to be restored. At that time, this body became the Office of the Manager of the Suite of His Imperial Majesty (significantly expanded and transformed into the Main Staff in 1815). Under his leadership, the responsibilities of the quartermaster officials in peacetime and wartime were urgently developed; regulations governing the service of quartermaster officers were drafted and approved; the officer staffing system of the Suite was organized; Suite officials were assigned to all armies, corps, and divisions; and, in collaboration with the Minister of War Barclay de Tolly, he developed the "Regulations for the Management of the Large Active Army." In those years, the Russian army also owes the establishment of a column leader school, which became the basis for staffing the general staff, and the creation of a military-topographic map depot.

In 1811, he sought the emperor's permission to create a library for the General Staff and, as a start, donated 500 books on military science and history from his personal library; in response, Alexander I allocated a substantial sum for its further development (now the General Staff Library).

During the French invasion of Russia, he served directly under the emperor and rendered important services several times. At his suggestion, Emperor Alexander I agreed to the retreat of Russian troops from the fortified camp near Drissa, which was poorly situated.

During the foreign campaign of 1813–1814, he served with the emperor as chief of the main staff. For his distinction in the battle of Lützen, he was promoted to lieutenant general (April 20, 1813). After the war, he traveled with the emperor to Vienna for the congress (August 1814), and when the congress sessions were interrupted by the news of Napoleon's escape from the island of Elba, he was entrusted with all orders concerning the movement of the Russian army from the Vistula to the Rhine. Upon his return to St. Petersburg, he was appointed chief of the Main Staff (1815) and director of the Military-Topographic Depot (1816–1823). He was promoted to general of infantry (December 12, 1817). Together with Count (later Prince of the Most Serene and Field Marshal) M. S. Vorontsov, he was awarded the Grand Cross of the English Order of the Bath (1819). He became a member of the State Council (June 5, 1821).

He was a close friend and patron of his brother-in-law S. G. Volkonsky. He was evidently aware of some plans of the members of the Southern Society. He supported the budget for the 2nd army prepared by A. P. Yushnevsky, which significantly exceeded its actual needs (early 1823). Due to a conflict with A. A. Arakcheev regarding this budget, he was dismissed from his position as chief of the Main Staff (April 25, 1823) and went on an overseas leave. He was a knight of the Order of St. Andrew the First-Called (December 12, 1823). He returned to St. Petersburg (1824) and served with Alexander I

He was an Ambassador to the Coronation in Reims of Charles X of France in 1825. Afterwards, he was Minister of Imperial Court and Properties between 1826 and 1852.

== Legacy ==
The mineral volkonskoite was named in honor of him in 1831.

== Notes ==
- Almagro (1843) notice sur le familles principales de la Russie
