= Nikolay Shatilov =

Russian nobleman and general (1849–1919)

Prince Nikolay Pavlovich Shatilov
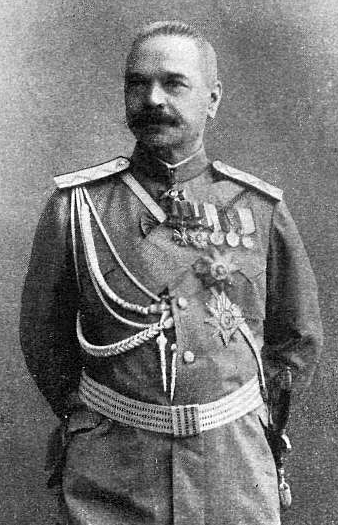
- Born: 31 January 1849; Russian Empire
- Died: 1919 (aged 69–70); Tbilisi, Democratic Republic of Georgia
- Military career
- Allegiance: Russian Empire
- Service years: 1867−1917
- Rank: General of the infantry
- Unit: 159th Gurian Infantry Regiment
- Commands: Moscow 3rd Cadets Corps; Pavel Military School; 4th Infantry Division; 10th Infantry Division; Kommandant of Łódź; Governor-general of the Piotrków Governorate; Governor-general of Tiflis; Deputy chairman of the Caucasus Viceroyalty
- Conflicts: Russo-Turkish War
- Other work: Member of the State Council

Prince Nikolay Pavlovich Shatilov (Russian: Шатилов, Николай Павлович; Georgian: ნიკოლაი პავლოვიჩ შატილოვი) (31 January 1849 – 1919) was a nobleman and general of the Russian Empire. He was the son of Pavel Nikolaevich Shatilov who also served as a commanding officer. Nikolay Shatilov was responsible for pacifying regional unrest in the Caucasus and initiating several judicial reforms. He also participated in the 1877 Russo-Turkish war and was decorated with several awards. After retiring from service, he went back to Tbilisi where he spent the last years of his life.

== Awards ==
Three times Order of Saint Vladimir 2nd (1904), 3rd (1889) and 4th Grade (1877)
Two times Order of Saint Stanislaus first (1896) and second Grade (1883)
Two times Order of Saint Anna first (1900) and second Grade (1886)
Order of the White Eagle (1906)
Order of Saint Alexander Nevsky (1911), diamond stripes (1913)
Medal Nicholas II 300 years of the Romanov Dynasty (1913)
