= Dulovo, Bulgaria =

Dulovo Дулово
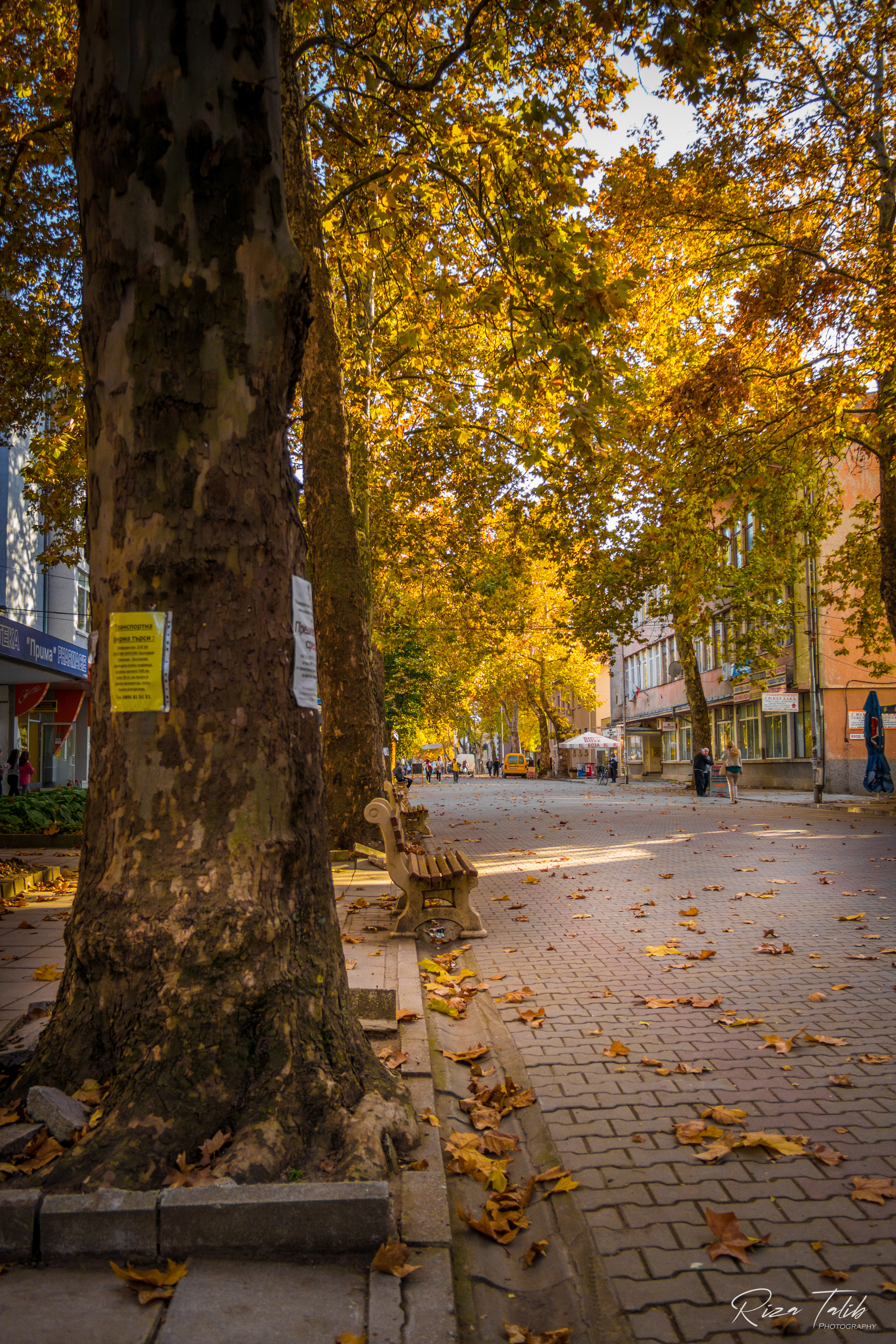
- The center of Dulovo

- Location of Dulovo, Bulgaria
- Coordinates: 43°49′N 27°9′E
- Country: Bulgaria
- Province (Oblast): Silistra

Government
  - Mayor: Nevhis Mustafa
- Elevation: 237 m (778 ft)

Population (December 2009)
  - Total: 6,621
- Time zone: UTC+2 (EET)
  - Summer (DST): UTC+3 (EEST)
- Postal Code: 7650
- Area code: 0864
- License plate: CC
- Climate: Cfb
- Website: http://www.dulovo.bg/

Dulovo (Bulgarian: Дулово [ˈduɫovo], Turkish: Akkadınlar, lit. "White women"; Romanian: Accadânlar) is a town in Silistra Province in northeastern Bulgaria, in the Ludogorie region. As the administrative centre of the homonymous Dulovo Municipality, it is the third largest town in the province after Silistra and Tutrakan. As of December 2009, the town had a population of 6,621.

Dulovo, then a village, was first mentioned in an Ottoman document of 1573 as "Akkadınlar", meaning "White Women". Even before the Liberation of Bulgaria in 1878, it had a mixed population of Bulgarians (settlers from the region of Preslav) and Turks, which is still reflected in the ethnic composition today. Following the Second Balkan War, Bulgaria was forced to cede it to Romania along with all of Southern Dobruja. It was also a district centre of Durostor County under Romanian rule. The village was given back to Bulgaria according to the Treaty of Craiova of 1940. In 1942, it acquired its present name (in honour of the early medieval Bulgarian Dulo clan, with the Bulgarian placename suffix –ovo). On 30 January 1960, Dulovo was granted town status.

== Municipality ==
Dulovo is the administrative centre of Dulovo municipality (part of Silistra Province), which includes the following 27 localities:

- Boil
- Cherkovna
- Chernik
- Chernolik
- Dolets
- Dulovo
- Grancharovo
- Kozyak
- Kolobar
- Mezhden
- Oven
- Okorsh
- Oreshene
- Paisievo
- Polkovnik Taslakovo
- Poroyno
- Pravda
- Prohlada
- Razdel
- Ruyno
- Sekulovo
- Skala
- Varbino
- Vodno
- Vokil
- Yarebitsa
- Zlatoklas
