= Alfatar =

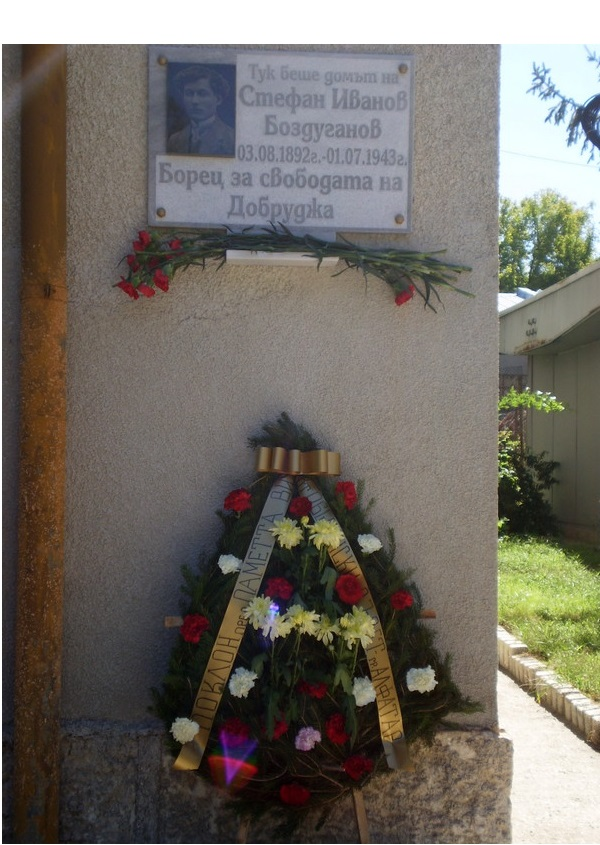

- Location of Alfatar
- Coordinates: 43°57′N 27°17′E
- Country: Bulgaria
- Provinces (Oblast): Silistra

Government
  - Mayor: Teodosi Gospodinov
- Elevation: 188 m (617 ft)

Population (31.12.2009)
  - Total: 1,714
- Time zone: UTC+2 (EET)
  - Summer (DST): UTC+3 (EEST)
- Postal Code: 7570
- Area code: 08511
- Climate: Cfb

Alfatar (Bulgarian: Алфатар [aɫfɐˈtar]) is a town in Silistra Province, Northeastern Bulgaria, located in 18 km (11 mi) to the south of the town of Silistra. It is the administrative centre of the homonymous Alfatar Municipality. As of December 2009, the town had a population of 1,714.

The Alfatar Peninsula on Robert Island, South Shetland Islands is named after Alfatar.

== Population ==
As of December 2018, the town of Alfatar has a dwindling population of 1,395 people, down from its peak of 4,358 people shortly after the Second World War. Alfatar is exclusively inhabited by ethnic Bulgarians (100%).
