= Battle of Karasu =

- Part of the Russo-Turkish War (1768–1774)
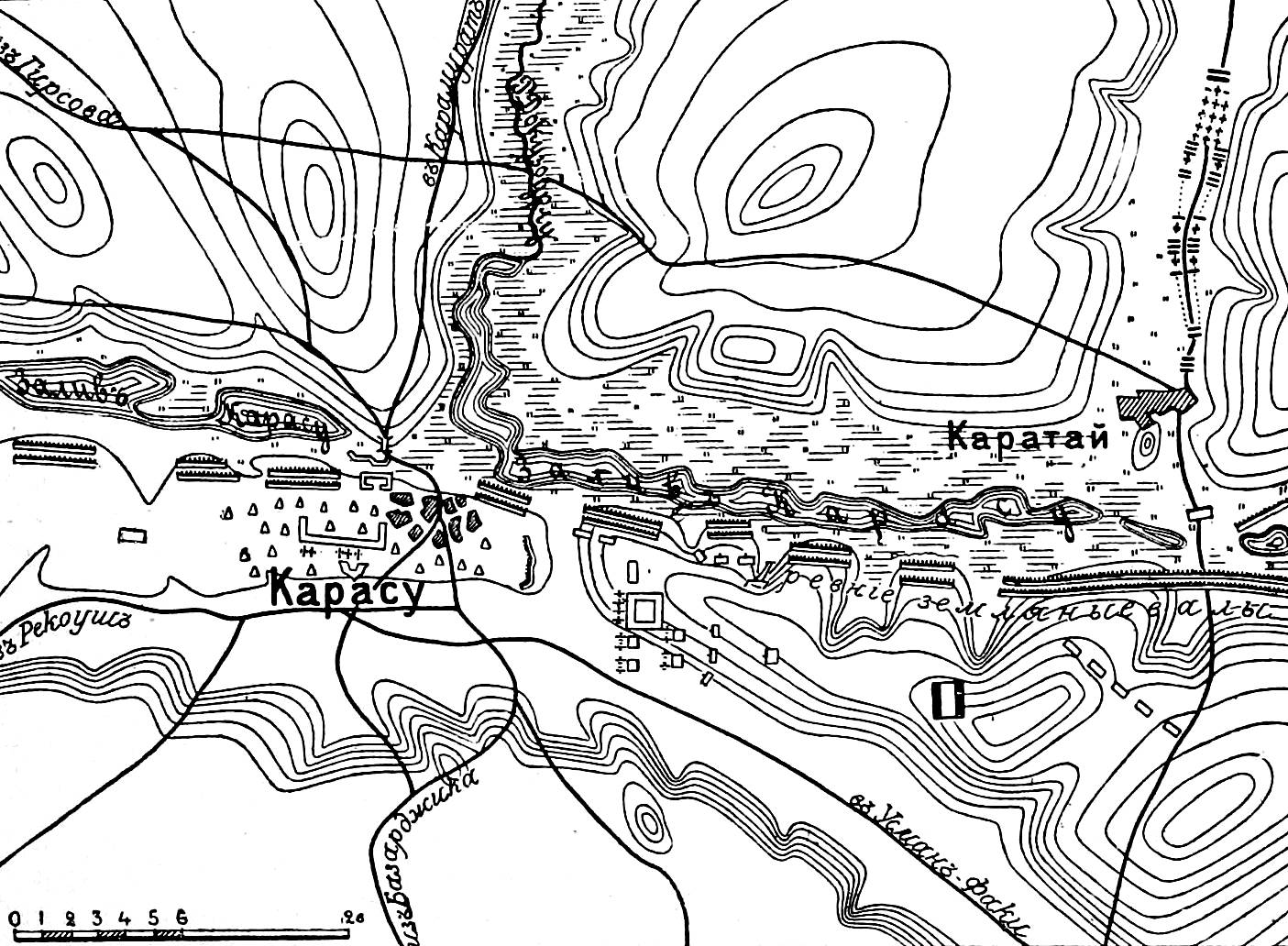
| Date | 27 May 1773 |
| Location | Karasu, Dobrudja, Ottoman Empire |
| Result | Russian victory |

Belligerents
| Russian Empire | Ottoman Empire |

Commanders and leaders
| (Russian Empire) Weismann von Weissenstein | (Ottoman Empire) Abda Pasha |

Strength
| 6,500; 38 guns | 12,000 |

Casualties and losses
| 58 killed 121 wounded | 1,200 killed 104 captured 16 weapons |

The First Battle of Karasu was a battle that occurred during the Russian–Turkish War of 1768-1774, which took place during the Russian army's campaign in Wallachia and Rumelia.

== Prelude ==
There were differences between Ekaterina II and P. A. Rumyantsev regarding the plan for the 1773 campaign on the Danube. The Empress proposed to go on the offensive, defeat the Turks and push them back to Balkans. The commander of the 1st Army defended the former tactics of raids by small detachments. Under pressure from the empress, he had to adopt the option of more active operations beyond the Danube. The first object of the onslaught, according to the plan, was the fortress Silistria. The advance of the main forces was to be facilitated by the actions (searches) of the detachments of O. A. Weismann and I. P. Saltykov on the right bank of the Danube. Weismann crossed the Danube, and on May 26 his detachment (6,500 men with 38 guns) assembled at Karamurat. Turkish camp at Karasu was covered on the north side of the bay and two ramparts of old earthen fortifications; on the isthmus formed by the bay, a battery was built. Due to the difficulty of attacking from the front, Weismann decided to bypass the position from the right flank, from where the Turkish camp was covered by only one retrenchment.

At 2 a.m. on May 27, Weismann set out from Karamurat. In the vanguard marched Colonel R. F. Leviz. The main forces moved in 2 columns: Weismann himself and Major-General Prince Golitsyn; the artillery followed between the columns. The movement was closed by the rearguard of Premier Major-General Glebov (500 men and 4 guns).

== Battle ==
At 5 a.m. the detachment approached the tip of Karasu Bay. The Turks sent some cavalry to meet them, which after a skirmish fled to their main forces on the heights to the south. Leviz moved Cossacks and karabiner, but the Turks retreated without a fight, partly to Karasu, partly to Usman-Faki. Weisman ordered Levis to continue moving towards Karasu, but not to do anything decisive until the arrival of the main forces. Following on, Levis overturned the Turkish cavalry on the offensive and approached the eastern retrenchment. The enemy cavalry, turning to the left, in a gully, opened the retrenchment, whence began a cannonade on the vanguard, confusing it. This was taken advantage of by the Turkish cavalry, which attacked the left flank and forced the Russian cavalry to fall back on their infantry, who stopped the Turks with rifle fire and gave the cavalry an opportunity to regain their ranks.

At this time the main force was approaching the battle site. Weismann ordered the artillery to shell the retrenchment and then moved the infantry to attack. The Turks did not wait for the Russian approach and, leaving the camp and the retrenchment, began at 8 o'clock to retreat along the road to Bazardzhik. Russian cavalry pursued the retreating enemy for 10 versts. The Turks lost up to 1,200 killed, 104 prisoners and 16 cannon, the entire camp and wagon; the Russians lost 58 killed and 121 wounded.

== References/Sources ==
- Богданович Модест Иванович. Походы Румянцева, Потемкина и Суворова в Турции. Тип. Эдуарда Веймара. СПб. 1852. 310 с.
- Петров Андрей Николаевич. Война России с Турцией и Польскими конфедератами с 1769-1774 год. Том IV. Тип. и Литография А. Траншеля. СПб., 1874. 418 с.
- Петров Андрей Николаевич. Влияние турецких войн с половины прошлого столетия на развитие русского военного искусства. Том I. СПб., 1893.
- РУНИВЕРС. Кампания в Валахии и Румелии в 1773 г.
