= Mihail Moruzov =

Romanian founder of domestic espionage agency (1887–1940)

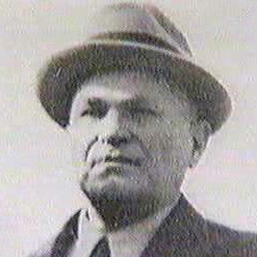
- Born: 8 November 1887; Zebil, Tulcea County, Romania
- Died: 26 November 1940 (aged 53); Jilava Prison, Ilfov County, Romania
- Known for: Founder of the Romanian Secret Intelligence Service

Mihail Moruzov (8 November 1887 – 26 November 1940) was the founder and first head of Romania's modern domestic espionage agency, the Secret Intelligence Service (SSI), forerunner of today's SRI.

== Biography ==
=== Early life ===
Moruzov was born in Zebil, Tulcea County, to Nicolae and Maria Moruzov; he had four brothers and two sisters. The family was of Russian origin, Lipovans or possibly the descendants of Zaporozhian Cossacks. His grandfather Simion was a priest, as was his father, who served at the Russian church in Tulcea for forty years.

He was married twice: his first wife's family name was Văraru, and the couple had a daughter, Aurora-Florina; after they divorced, he married Teodora Săndulescu, a professor from Silistra whom he also divorced. His education was limited, which delayed his permanent appointment as intelligence chief (the position demanded university studies): he was initially paid a daily wage as a temporary employee. In addition to Russian, which he learned at home, and Romanian, he knew Ukrainian, Bulgarian, Turkish, and Tatar (languages spoken in his native Dobruja and the nearby Budjak).

=== Career ===
From 1917 to 1919 he headed the Dobruja Information and Security Service, then from 1924 to 1940, the Secret Intelligence Service of the Romanian Army, which he was instrumental in creating. His clandestine work took place amid a turbulent backdrop—the socio-economic upheaval following World War I; the rise of the Iron Guard; the threat, both internal and external, of Communism, and the increasing authoritarianism of King Carol II, who, along with other political and military leaders, trusted and stood by Moruzov for his qualities and successes. Self-confident and ambitious, his intrigues included gathering compromising information on certain figures, amplifying and creating new imbroglios, and even betraying the SSI’s activities.

His office was equipped with recording devices (on tapes and discs), bugs, detectors, transparent mirrors, periscopes for indirect observation, and sensitive photoelectric cells. His powerful Mercedes-Benz had a recording device and a two-way radio. After 1936, Moruzov established schools for preparing specialists, such as radio-telegraph operators, photo and film experts, and fingerprinters.

Moruzov had a keen talent for bringing together an impressive network of informants. Horia Sima was one of these, paid, according to Gheorghe, the brother of his successor Eugen Cristescu, 200,000 lei a month. Others included Princess Caradja (who worked with multiple agencies), Major Cristian Nicolae (a relative of the Brătianu family), Eugen Titianu (who kept him abreast of events at the newspaper Universul), Mitiță Constantinescu and Victor Iamandi (who offered information on Dinu Brătianu and the elder Liberals), Ghiță Marincu (who had links to all the main parties), Alexandru Vaida-Voevod, Nicolae Iorga (who carried out historical studies for the SSI), and Admiral Ion Coandă. He reserved substantial amounts of money for key figures in the leadership of the Ministry of Defence and the General Staff (one method he used was to rent rooms for them at inflated prices).

=== Downfall ===
Toward the end of his career, Moruzov’s fascination with the technical aspects of espionage, along with his attitude of indispensability, caused him to neglect his mission of providing intelligence for the nation’s leaders to consider as they saw fit. Eugen Cristescu later wrote: “Moruzov had long become entangled in the network of internal political intrigues [and] had confused political information with politics itself and the informants’ game with the political game. Thus he also fell into the cascade of intrigues between foreign intelligence services that fought for influence in our country”.

His activities drew the ire of Sima and especially Ion Antonescu, for whose mother, Liță Baranga, he had drawn up a compromising file, and for whose wife, Maria, he had initiated a bigamy trial. Unfortunately for Moruzov, events in the late summer of 1940 brought his chief adversaries Antonescu and Sima to power as premier (with dictatorial powers) and vice-premier. He was arrested on 6 September 1940 and, before the investigation was complete, was killed in the Jilava Massacre on 26 November 1940, in cell number 1.

== Notes ==
Government offices
New title SSI established	Head of the Romanian Secret Intelligence Service; 1924 – 1940	Succeeded by Eugen Cristescu
