= Kaynardzha =

Kaynardzha Кайнарджа
- Location of Kaynardzha
- Coordinates: 43°59′N 27°30′E
- Country: Bulgaria
- Provinces (Oblast): Silistra

Government
  - Mayor: Lyuben Sivev
- Elevation: 173 m (568 ft)

Population (2008)
  - Total: 882
- Time zone: UTC+2 (EET)
  - Summer (DST): UTC+3 (EEST)
- Postal Code: 7550
- Area code: 08517
- Climate: Cfb

Kaynardzha (also transliterated as Kajnardža; Bulgarian: Кайнарджа, IPA: [kɐjnɐrˈd͡ʒa]; Romanian: Cainargeaua Mică; Turkish: Kaynarca; Greek: Καϊναρτζή) is a village in northeastern Bulgaria, part of Silistra Province. It is the administrative centre of Kaynardzha Municipality, which lies in the easternmost part of Silistra Province, in the historical region of Southern Dobruja, close to the Romanian border.

The village is known as the location of the signing of the Treaty of Küçük Kaynarca on 21 July 1774 between Count Pyotr Rumyantsev, representative of Empress Catherine the Great of the Russian Empire and Musul Zade Mehmed Pasha, representative of Sultan Abdul Hamid I of the Ottoman Empire. The treaty put an end to the Russo-Turkish War of 1768–1774, which was devastating for the once-mighty Ottoman realm. It was also near this village that the Ottomans were defeated during the same war in the battle of Kaynardzha.

The village was taken away from Ottoman rule in 1878, following the Russo-Turkish War of 1877-78. After the Balkan Wars, it was ceded by the Kingdom of Bulgaria to the Kingdom of Romania along with all of Southern Dobruja; as part of the interwar Durostor County, it was known as Cainargeaua Mică, a translation and adaptation of the older Ottoman Turkish name, Küçük Kaynarca ("small spa place"). Per the Treaty of Craiova of 1940, all of Southern Dobruja was returned to Bulgaria.

Since October 2017, Kaynardzha has been linked with the neighbouring commune of Lipnița in Romania via the Kaynardzha-Lipnița border crossing.

== Municipality ==
Kaynardzha municipality covers an area of 316 square kilometres and includes the following 15 places:

- Davidovo
- Dobruđanka
- Goleš
- Gospodinovo
- Kaynardzha
- Kamenci
- Kranovo
- Polkovnik Čolakovo
- Poprusanovo
- Posev
- Središte
- Strelkovo
- Svetoslav
- Vojnovo
- Zarnik

== Gallery ==
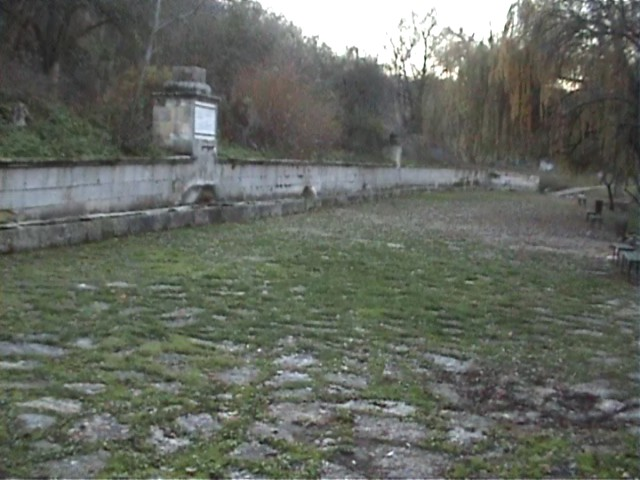
Location of the Treaty of Küçük Kaynarca's signing

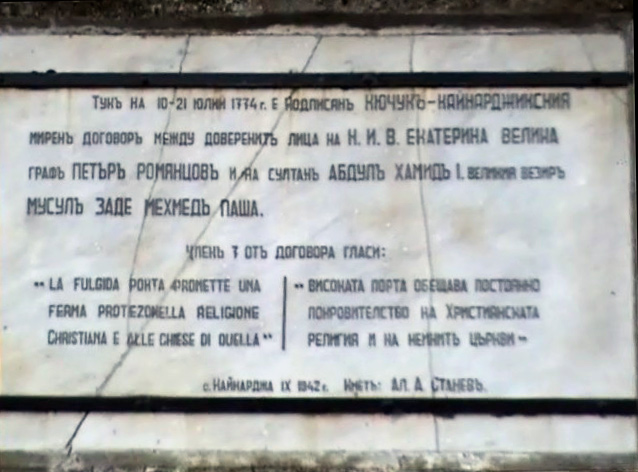
Memorial plaque
