= Yastrebna =

Village in Sitovo municipality, Silistra oblast, Bulgaria

Yastrebna (Bulgarian: Ястребна, Romanian: Atmagea) is a village in northeastern Bulgaria, part of the Sitovo Municipality in Silistra Province. The village has a population of 26 people as of 2009 and 4 households as of 2022. Yastrebna lies at 43°9′N 27°0′E, 129 m above sea level, with a stone pit nearby.

The current mayor is Edjevit Shaban.
