= Iskra, Silistra Province =

Village in Bulgaria

Iskra Искра
- Location of Iskra, Bulgaria
- Coordinates: 43°59′59.6″N 26°57′54.6″E
- Country: Bulgaria
- Provinces (Oblast): Silistra Province
- Elevation: 115 m (377 ft)

Population (15.09.2022)
  - Total: 1,974
- Time zone: UTC+2 (EET)
  - Summer (DST): UTC+3 (EEST)
- Postal Code: 7580
- Area codes: 08565 from Bulgaria, 003598565 from outside

Iskra (Bulgarian: Искра) is a village in northeastern Bulgaria, part of the Sitovo Municipality in Silistra Province. Iskra lies in the Danubian Plain at 115 m above sea level.

== Geography ==
Iskra is one of the largest villages in Bulgaria. Iskra is the largest village of Sitovo Municipality. As of 2022 the population of Iskra is 1,974. Its territory is 32.525 km^{2}. Iskra is located 400 km east of the capital city Sofia and 30 km away from the city of Silistra in the Dobruja region. The village has fertile vegetation and is famous for its apricots. The climate is temperate, with hot summers and cold winters. There are several ponds on the territory of the village where carp, bream and catfish can be caught. There are forests around the village where game birds, rabbits, foxes, jackals and other animals live.

== History ==
The Turkish name of the village is Aydoğdu, which means "moon rose" in English and "spark" in Bulgarian. The village was founded in the 1954 by the merger of three villages: Iskra, Miletich and Dragalina. In 1955 the village of Chehlari was also administratively joined to Iskra. In the Middle Ages the region was part of the First and the Second Bulgarian Empire. Following nearly five centuries of Ottoman rule, in 1878 the village was included in the reestablished Bulgarian state. During the Second Balkan War in 1913, the village and the whole region of Southern Dobruja were occupied by Romania and remained in that country until 1940, when it was returned to Bulgaria as a result of the Treaty of Craiova.

== Cultural and natural landmarks ==
In the village there is a school named Stefan Karadzha, built in 1962. There are two mosques and a church in the village. There are three fountains from the Ottoman period, small and large cattle were watered from these fountains. The village also has a cinema, health centre, nursery and grass football field.

== Regular events ==
In the village, celebrations are held by going to the forest on May 24 of every year to mark the Day of Slavonic Alphabet, Bulgarian Enlightenment and Culture. Horse races and cultural events are organized.

== Gallery ==
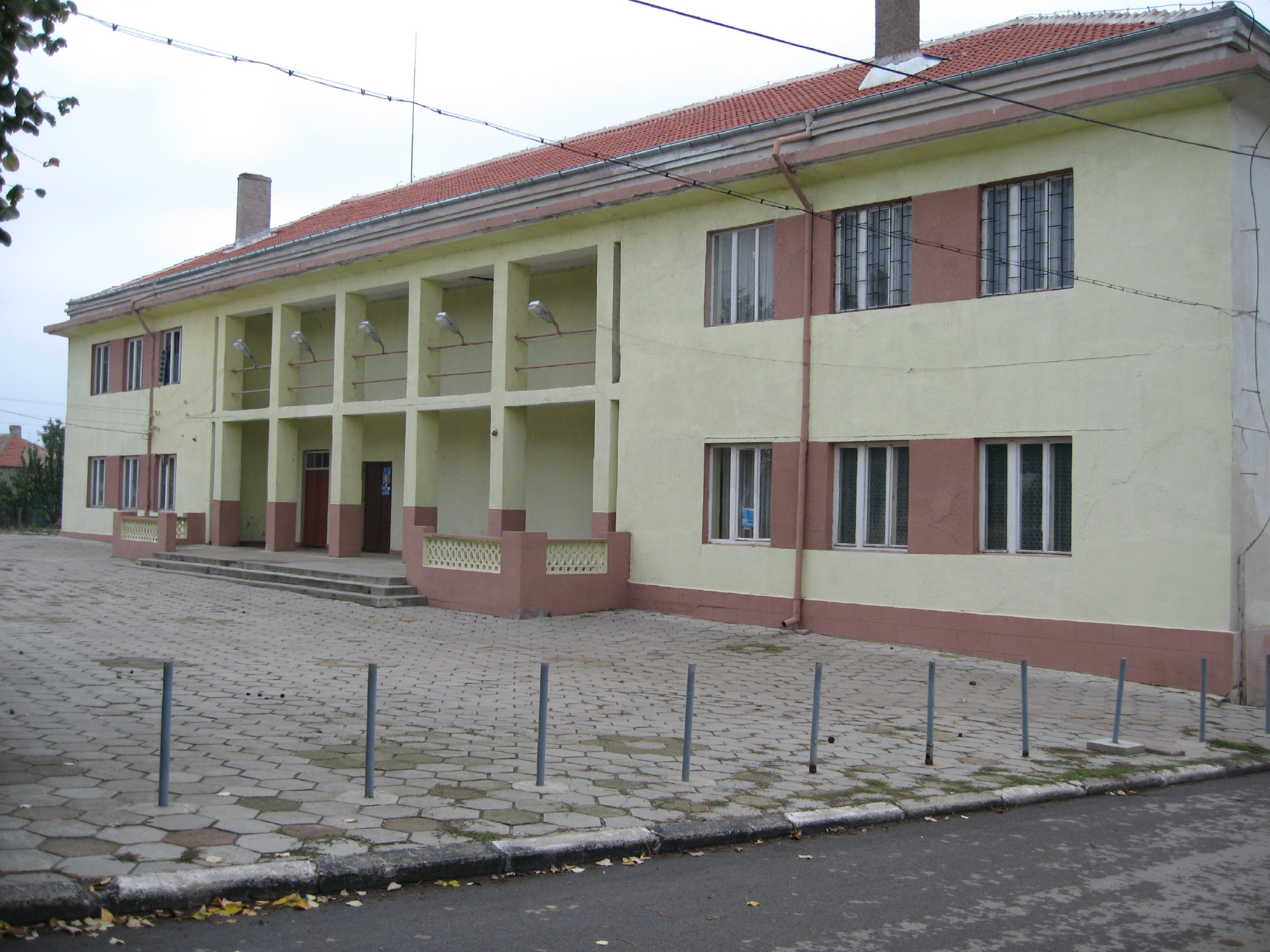
Theater/cinema hall in the village

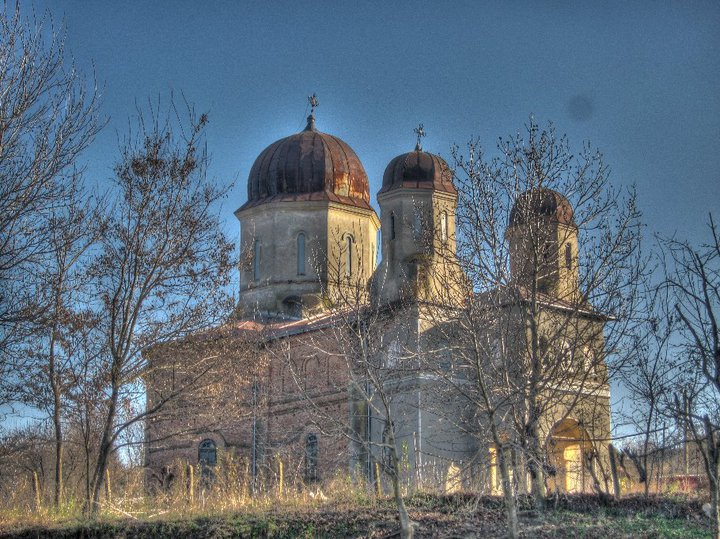
Old church in the village

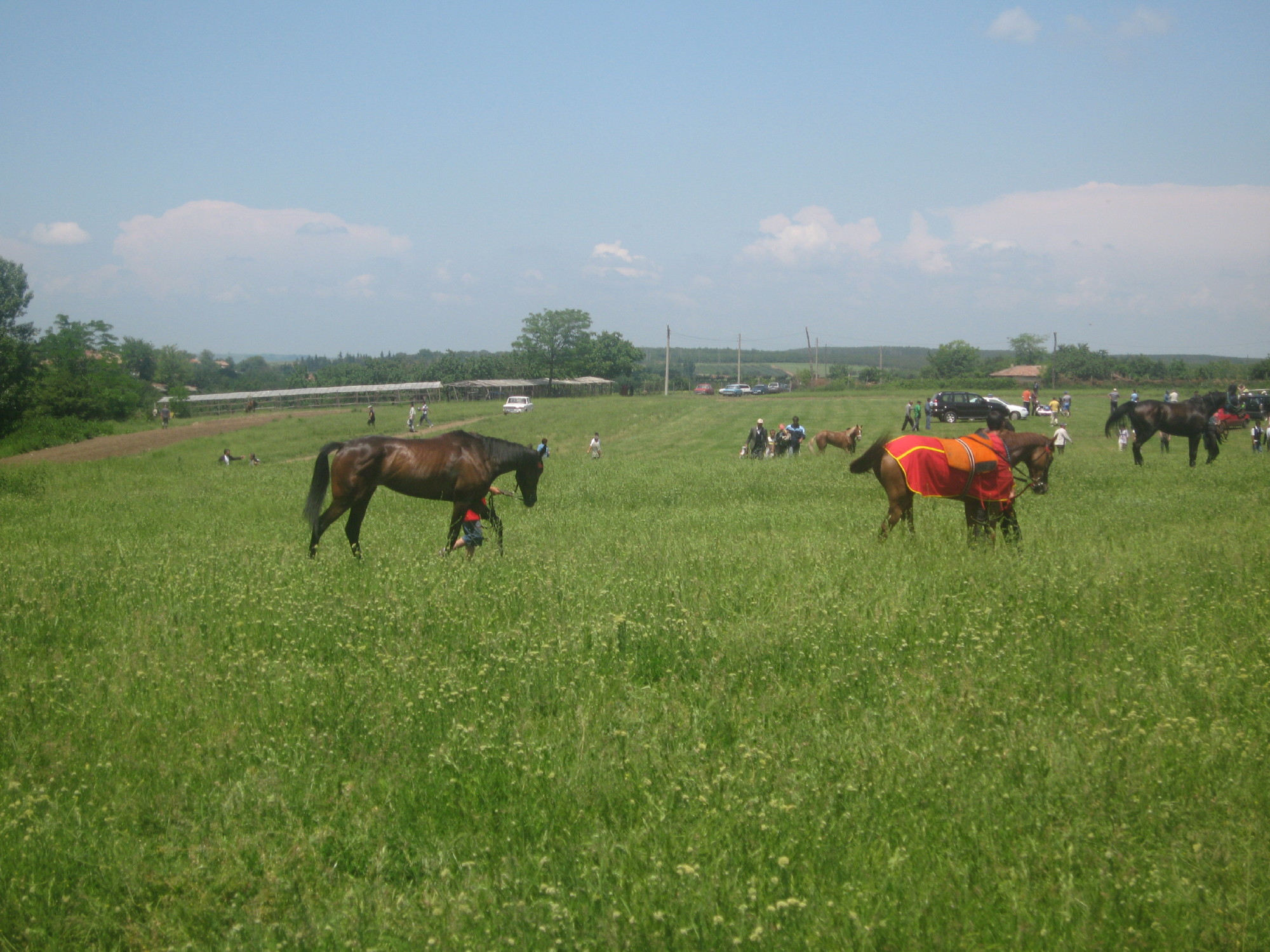
Horse races held during May 24 celebrations
