= Battle of Küçük Kaynarca =

1773 battle in the Russo-Turkish War

- Part of the Russo-Turkish War (1768–1774)
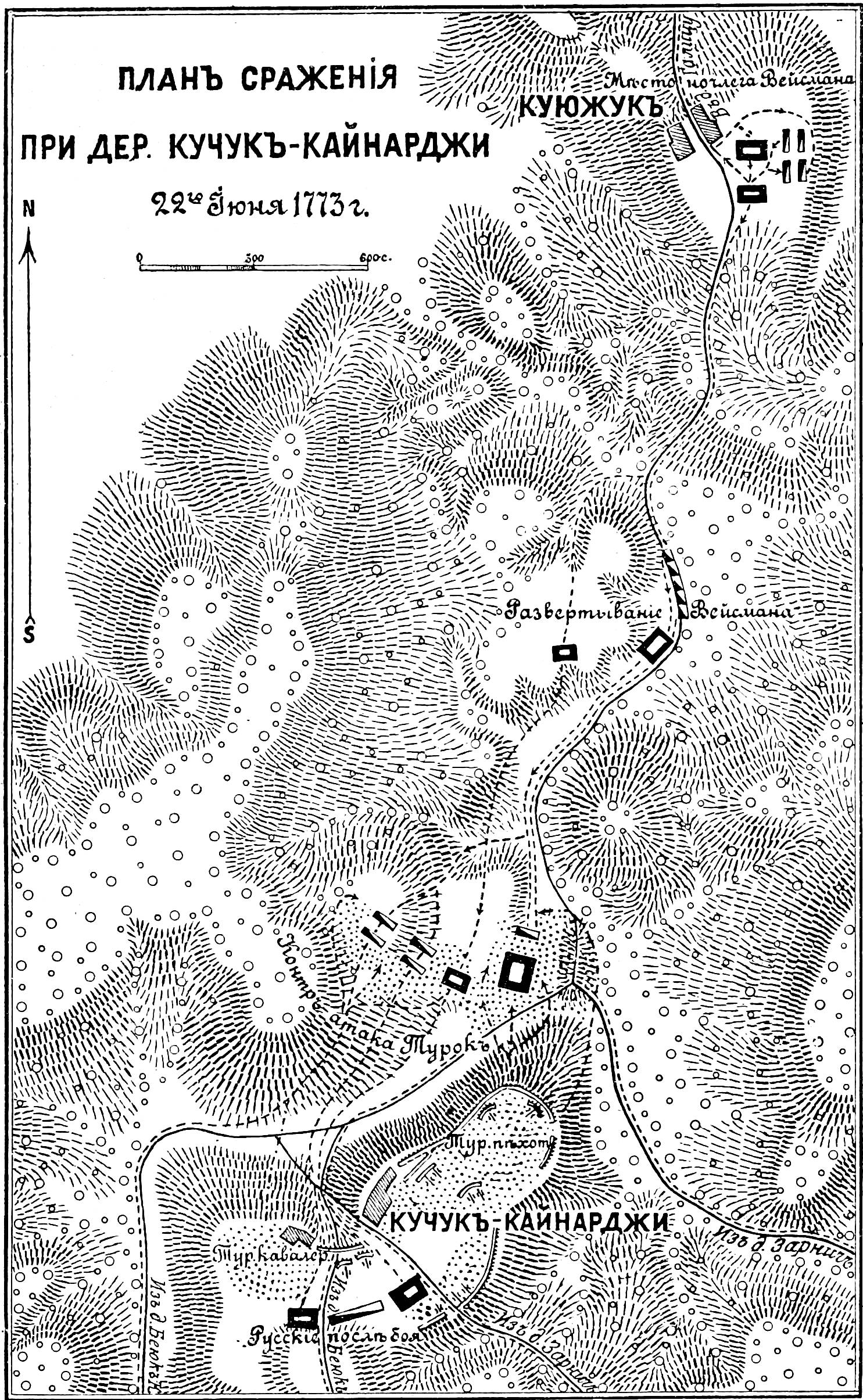
- The battle plan from the Sytin Military Encyclopedia
Date	3 July [O.S. 22 June] 1773
Location	Kaynardzha, Ottoman Empire (Now in Bulgaria)
Result	Russian victory

Belligerents
Ottoman Empire	Russia

Commanders and leaders
(Ottoman Empire) Numan Pasha	(Russian Empire) Weismann von Weissenstein †

Strength
20,000	5,600

Casualties and losses
4,000 to 5,000 dead	19 killed 161 wounded

The battle of Küçük Kaynarca, also known as the battle of Kaynarca (Russian: Битва при Кайнарджи; Turkish: Kaynarca Muharebesi), was a major battle during the Russo-Turkish War (1768–1774). It was fought between the units of Otto Weismann, one of Catherine the Great's finest generals, and Ottoman soldiers under the command of Numan Pasha.

== Background ==
After the unsuccessful siege, the Russian army was in danger of a possible encirclement between the 30,000 garrison of Silistra and the corps of Numan Pasha, and to counteract the latter, a detachment of General Weismann with 5,600 people was sent.

== Battle ==
Following Rumyantsev's order on July 2, 1773, Weismann moved to meet Numan Pasha's army, and on July 3 attacked his camp. The Turks fought bravely at the beginning and were able to break through Weismann's infantry square wounding him in the heart. The Russian army fiercely repelled this attack and the morale of the Ottoman troops fell; the Russians did not spare even the prisoners.

== Aftermath ==
A year later, an agreement was signed at the site of the battle, which stopped 6 years of bloodshed between Russia and the Ottoman Empire. The agreement was very beneficial to the Russians and the Turks ceded significant territories.

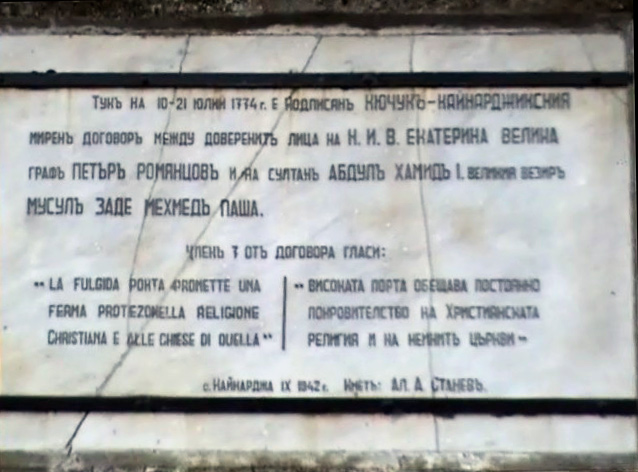
A monument at the place where the truce was concluded
