= Bosna (village) =

Coordinates: 43°58′N 26°58′E

Bosna village is located in Sitovo municipality in Silistra Province, north-eastern Bulgaria.
