= Glavinitsa Municipality =

Glavinitsa Municipality Община Главиница
- Municipality
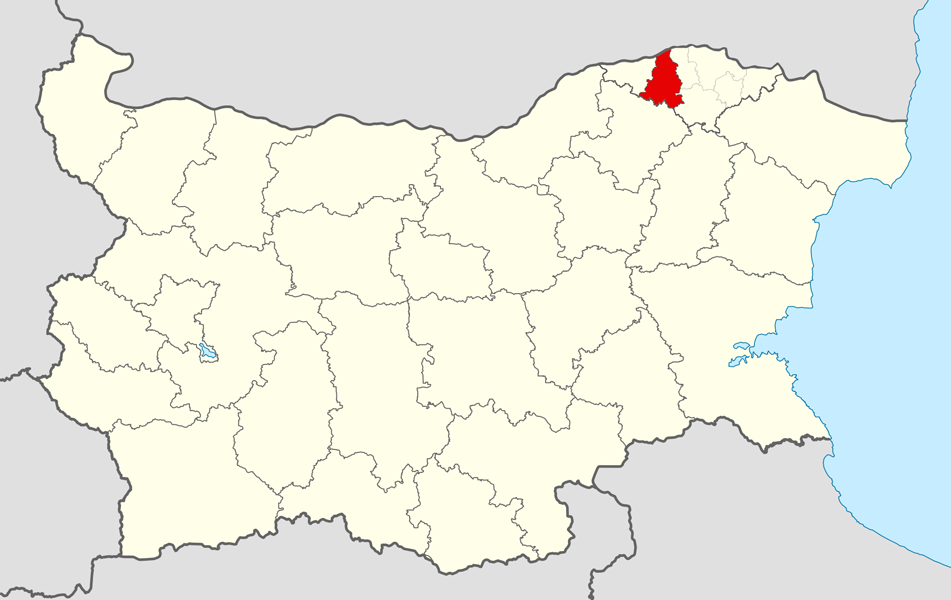
- Glavinitsa Municipality within Bulgaria and Silistra Province.
- Coordinates: 43°56′N 26°50′E
- Country: Bulgaria
- Province (Oblast): Silistra
- Admin. centre (Obshtinski tsentar): Glavinitsa

Area
  - Total: 481.23 km^{2} (185.80 sq mi)

Population (December 2009)
  - Total: 12,610
  - Density: 26.20/km^{2} (67.87/sq mi)
- Time zone: UTC+2 (EET)
  - Summer (DST): UTC+3 (EEST)
- Climate: Cfb

Glavinitsa Municipality (Bulgarian: Община Главиница) is a municipality (obshtina) in Silistra Province, Northeastern Bulgaria, located along the right bank of Danube river in the Danubian Plain in the area of the South Dobrudzha geographical region. It is named after its administrative centre – the town of Glavinitsa.

The municipality embraces a territory of 481.23 km^{2} (185.80 sq mi) with a population of 12,610 inhabitants, as of December 2009.

The main road II-21 crosses the area from east to west, connecting the province centre of Silistra with the city of Ruse.

== Settlements ==
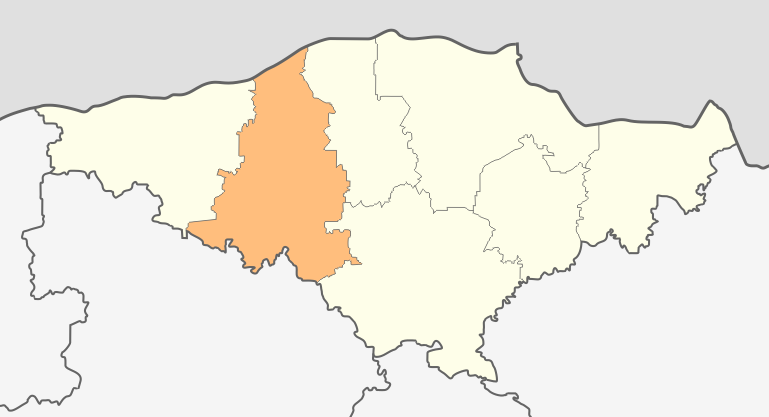
Glavinitsa Municipality within Silistra Province

Glavinitsa Municipality includes the following 23 places all of them villages:

Town/Village	Cyrillic	Population (December 2009)
Glavinitsa	Главиница	1,928
Bashtino	Бащино	167
Bogdantsi	Богданци	699
Chernogor	Черногор	451
Dichevo	Дичево	471
Dolno Ryahovo	Долно Ряхово	405
Kalugerene	Калугерене	551
Kolarovo	Коларово	369
Kosara	Косара	213
Listets	Листец	583
Malak Preslavets	Малък Преславец	365
Nozharevo	Ножарево	572
Osen	Осен	144
Padina	Падина	415
Podles	Подлес	187
Sokol	Сокол	353
Kosara	Стефан Караджа	1,031
Suhodol	Суходол	775
Valkan	Вълкан	383
Zaritsa	Зарица	446
Zafirovo	Зафирово	933
Zvenimir	Звенимир	454
Zebil	Зебил	715
Total		12,610

== Demography ==
The following table shows the change of the population during the last four decades. Since 1992 Glavinitsa Municipality has comprised the former municipality of General Zafirovo and the numbers in the table reflect this unification.

Glavinitsa Municipality
Year	1975	1985	1992	2001	2005	2007	2009	2011
Population	10,230	9,930	15,579	13,848	13,298	12,959	12,610	...
Sources: Census 2001, Census 2011, „pop-stat.mashke.org“,

=== Ethnic groups ===
Ethnic Turks constitute the majority of the population of Glavinitsa Municipality, followed by a large Bulgarian minority and a small Roma community.

Ethnic groups in Glavinitsa Municipality (2011 census)
Ethnic group	Percentage
Bulgarians	29.2%
Turks	68.0%
Roma	2.2%
others and indefinable	0.6%

=== Demographic indicators ===
The municipality of Glavinitsa is losing many inhabitants. Last decade, the number of births decreased slightly while the number of deaths increased significantly.

	Population	Live births	Deaths	Natural growth	Birth rate (‰)	Death rate (‰)	Natural growth rate (‰)
2000	14,662	126	203	−77	8.6	13.8	−5.3
2001	13,743	126	201	−75	9.2	14.6	−5.5
2002	13,693	114	244	−130	8.3	17.8	−9.5
2003	13,564	118	201	−83	8.7	14.8	−6.1
2004	13,400	91	184	−93	6.8	13.7	−6.9
2005	13,298	110	193	−83	8.3	14.5	−6.2
2006	13,077	93	201	−108	7.1	15.4	8.3
2007	12,959	122	203	−81	9.4	15.7	−6.3
2008	12,767	116	209	−93	9.1	16.4	−7.3
2009	12,610	122	162	−40	9.7	12.8	−3.2
2010	12,445	98	184	−86	7.9	14.8	−6.9
2011	10,797	95	198	−103	8.8	18.3	−9.5
2012	10,642	96	208	−112	9.0	19.5	−10.5
2013	10,553	103	171	−68	9.8	16.2	−6.4
2014	10,407	93	202	−109	8.9	19.4	−10.5
2015	10,360	98	197	99	9.5	19.0	−9.6
2016	10,243	91	166	−75	8.9	16.2	−7.3
2017	10,085	82	169	−87	8.1	16.8	−8.6
2018	9,897	73	206	-133	7.4	20.8	-13.4

=== Religion ===
According to the latest Bulgarian census of 2011, the religious composition, among those who answered the optional question on religious identification, was the following:

Religious composition of Glavinitsa Municipality
Orthodox Christianity	27.2%
Catholicism	0.4%
Protestantism	0.2%
Islam	70.1%
No religion	0.4%
Prefer not to answer, others and indefinable	1.7%

== See also ==
- Provinces of Bulgaria
- Municipalities of Bulgaria
- List of cities and towns in Bulgaria
