= Alfatar Municipality =

Alfatar Municipality Община Алфатар
- Municipality
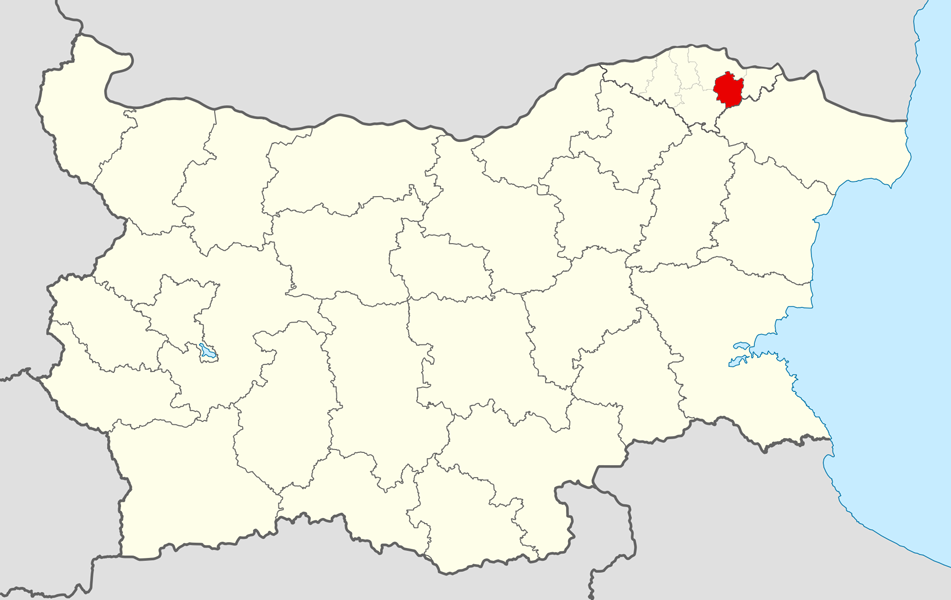
- Alfatar Municipality within Bulgaria and Silistra Province.
- Coordinates: 43°55′N 27°17′E
- Country: Bulgaria
- Province (Oblast): Silistra
- Admin. centre (Obshtinski tsentar): Alfatar

Area
  - Total: 248.57 km^{2} (95.97 sq mi)

Population (December 2009)
  - Total: 3,324
  - Density: 13.37/km^{2} (34.63/sq mi)
- Time zone: UTC+2 (EET)
  - Summer (DST): UTC+3 (EEST)

Alfatar Municipality (Bulgarian: Община Алфатар) is a small municipality (obshtina) in Silistra Province, Northeastern Bulgaria, located in the Danubian Plain, in the area of the South Dobrudzha geographical region, about 15 km south of Danube river. It is named after its administrative centre - the town of Alfatar.

The municipality embraces a territory of 248.57 km^{2} (95.97 sq mi) with a population of 3,324 inhabitants, as of December 2009.

The main road "7" crosses the area from north to south, connecting the province centre of Silistra with the city of Shumen and the eastern operating part of Hemus motorway.

== Settlements ==
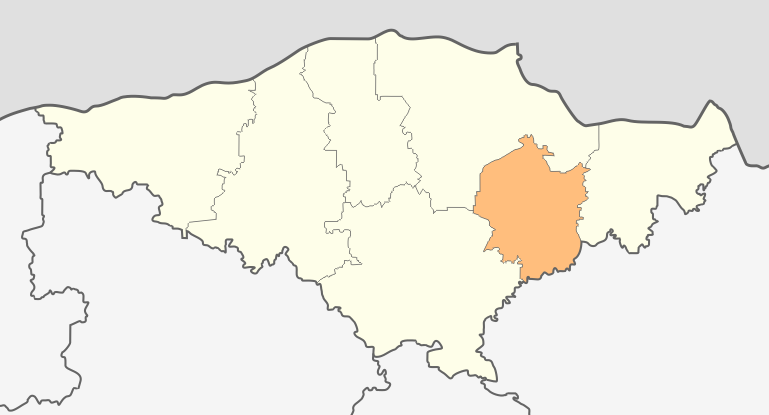
Alfatar Municipality within Silistra Province

Alfatar Municipality includes the following 7 places (towns are shown in bold):

Town/Village	Cyrillic	Population (December 2009)
**Alfatar**	**Алфатар**	1,714
Alekovo	Алеково	578
Bistra	Бистра	367
Chukovets	Чуковец	287
Kutlovitsa	Кутловица	77
Tsar Asen	Цар Асен	191
Vasil Levski	Васил Левски	110
Total		3,324

== Demography ==
The following table shows the change of the population during the last four decades.

Alfatar Municipality
**Year**	1975	1985	1992	**2001**	2005	2007	2009	**2011**
**Population**	6,373	5,454	4,630	3,990	3,629	3,451	3,324	...
Sources: Census 2001, Census 2011, „pop-stat.mashke.org“,

=== Ethnic groups ===
Ethnic Bulgarians constitute the majority of the population of Alfatar Municipality, followed by ethnic Turks and Roma people in Bulgaria.

Ethnic groups in Alfatar Municipality (2011 census)
Ethnic group	Percentage
Bulgarians	73.6%
Turks	15.1%
Roma	11.0%
others and indefinable	0.3%

=== Religion ===
According to the latest Bulgarian census of 2011, the religious composition, among those who answered the optional question on religious identification, was the following:

Religious composition of Alfatar Municipality
Orthodox Christianity	68.8%
Catholicism	0.0%
Protestantism	0.1%
Islam	20.2%
No religion	4.9%
Prefer not to answer, others and indefinable	6.0%

=== Vital statistics ===
	Population	Live births	Deaths	Natural growth	Birth rate (‰)	Death rate (‰)	Natural growth rate (‰)
2000	4,313	38	91	-53	8.8	21.0	-12.3
2001	3,927	29	92	-63	7.4	23.4	-16.0
2002	3,813	18	90	-72	4.7	23.6	-18.9
2003	3,725	26	95	-69	7.0	25.5	-18.5
2004	3,655	23	80	-57	6.3	21.9	-15.6
2005	3,629	18	85	-67	5.0	23.4	-18.5
2006	3,544	18	91	-73	5.1	25.7	-20.6
2007	3,451	19	74	-55	5.5	21.4	-15.9
2008	3,390	20	68	-48	5.9	20.1	-14.2
2009	3,324	34	80	-46	10.2	24.1	-13.9
2010	3,241	10	64	-54	3.1	19.7	-16.7
2011	3,020	23	64	-41	7.6	21.2	-13.6
2012	2,952	15	74	-59	5.1	25.1	-20.0
2013	2,892	14	64	-50	4.8	22.1	-17.3
2014	2,812	18	79	-61	6.4	28.1	-21.7
2015	2,761	13	65	-52	4.7	23.5	-18.8
2016	2,704	21	69	-48	7.8	25.5	-17.8
2017	2,690	23	64	-41	8.6	23.8	-15.2
2018	2,655	15	77	-62	5.6	29.0	-23.4

== See also ==
- Provinces of Bulgaria
- Municipalities of Bulgaria
- List of cities and towns in Bulgaria
