= Siege of Silistra (1773) =

1773 siege during the Russo-Turkish war

- Part of the Russo-Turkish War (1768–1774)
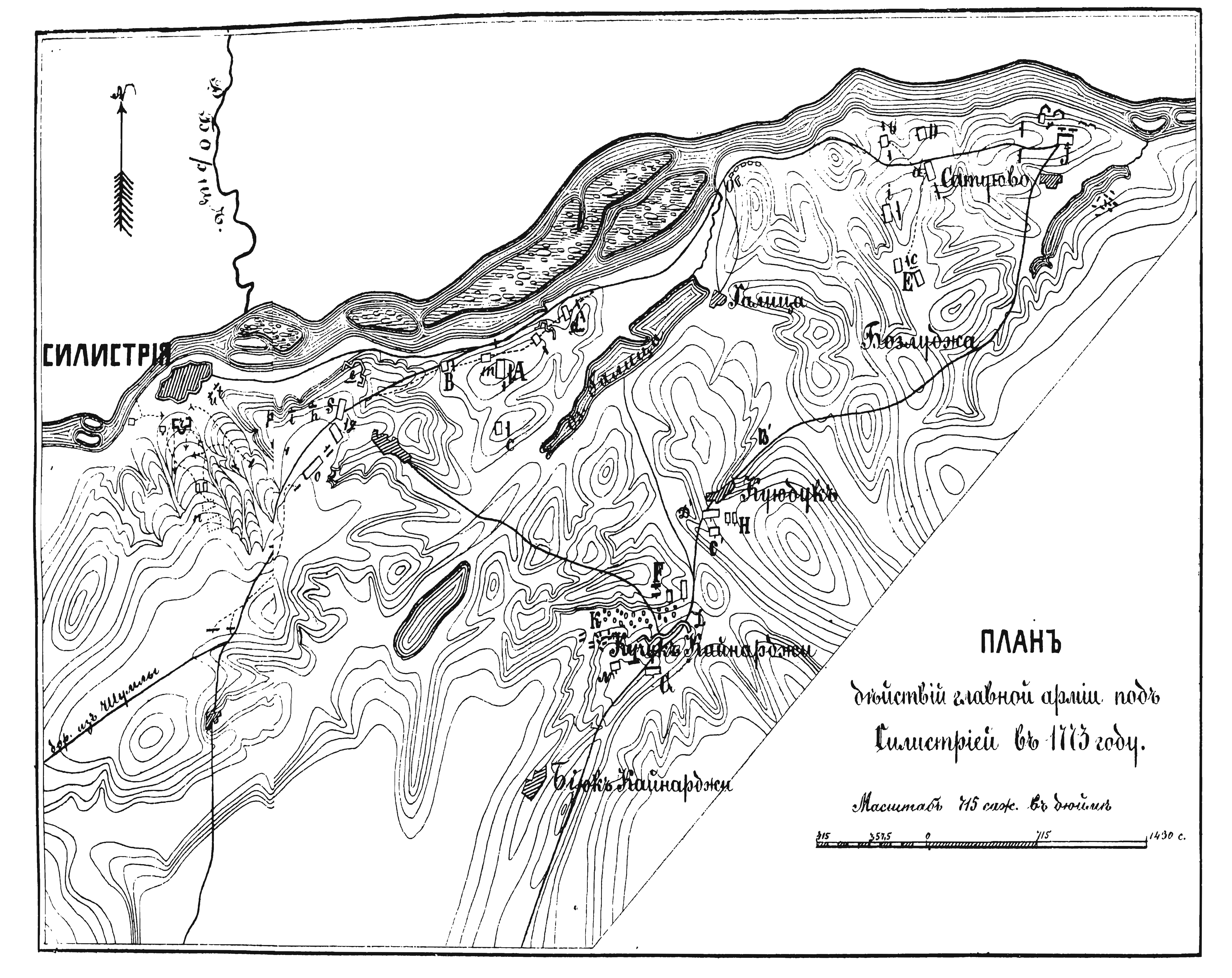
- Plan of Russian military operations around Silistra in June 1773
Date	18–29 June 1773
Location	Silistra, Ottoman Empire 44°06′33″N 27°15′55″E
Result	Ottoman victory

Belligerents
Ottoman Empire	Russian Empire

Commanders and leaders
(Ottoman Empire) Osman Pasha (Ottoman Empire) Seyyid Hasan Pasha (Ottoman Empire) Çerkes Pasha	Pyotr Rumyantsev; Aleksey Stupishin; Grigory Potemkin; Otto Weismann; Iosif Igelström; Fyodor Glebov; Nikolai Kokovinsky; Franz Klitschka; Mikhail Leontyev; Henry Lloyd

Strength
70,000; 24,000 to 30,000 garrison; 7,000 relief force; 33,000 unengaged (Note: During the siege, there were as many as 70,000 Ottoman soldiers in the vicinity of Silistra Eyalet. However, only 37,000 engaged in combat. In the garrison of Silistra, there were 30,000 men. 10 days into the siege, on 28 June, a battle occurred with a 7,000-strong force of Çerkes Pasha, who attempted to forcibly lift the siege (see § Battle with Çerkes Pasha's relief force). On 29 June, hearing that Numan Pasha was marching onto Silistra with 20,000 men, Rumyantsev withdrew from Silistra on 29 June without any clashes.)	21,380 to 50,000; 74 field guns Numerous mortars

Casualties and losses
18 June: 600 casualties (Bogdanovich)	18 June: 8,000 killed 1,000 injured (von Hammer-Purgstall) 300 casualties (Bogdanovich) Total: Bodart: 5,000, 14 cannons
- Location within Europe Siege of Silistra (1773) (Bulgaria)

The siege of Silistra (Note: Turkish: Silistre Kuşatması; Russian: Осада Силистрии; Bulgarian: Обсада на Силистра) was a military siege undertaken by Russia between 18 and 29 June 1773 against the Ottoman city of Silistria. The siege was an important phase of the Russo-Turkish War (1768–1774), and resulted in an Ottoman victory.

== Prelude ==
In 1773, Catherine the Great ordered for Pyotr Rumyantsev to march with his army onto Silistra to pressure the Ottoman Empire into peace. With this, he crossed the Danube with a tens-of-thousands-strong force after a pontoon bridge was built across the Galitsa. Grigory Potemkin and Otto Weismann's forces were at the front of this army. Rumyantsev ordered Major-general Matvey Muromtsov to have roads built out to Silistra. On 12 June, Potemkin and Weismann were sent in two columns towards Silistra. They were both under the command of Aleksey Stupishin. There was constant fighting between Ottoman and Russian troops before they reached the fortress on 15 June.

Stupishin sent a letter the same day to Serasker Halıcı Osman Pasha (the ethnically Armenian pasha defending the fortress alongside Seyyid Hasan Pasha), that the main Russian army would attack Silistra and block any reinforcement intended to aid him if he did not surrender. Stupishin promised everyone would be spared, threatening to bring a disaster upon the pasha if he refused to surrender. The next night, Osman Pasha sent a letter where he said that he had already taken measures to ensure that his cavalry surrounded the Russian troops. He went onto state that nothing scared him and that he would "not even give a single stone or a nail to the Russian dogs", let alone the fortress.

== Siege ==
=== Battle for the redoubt ===
On 18 June, the 21,380-strong Russian army (other estimates give a figure as high as 50,000) reinforced with 74 field guns, besieged Silistra. The Ottoman garrison numbered 24,000–30,000 men. Grigory Potemkin and Otto Weismann were tasked with seizing a redoubt on a hill overlooking Silistra. Potemkin's force, composed of 1,206 grenadiers; Iosif Igelström's unit, made up of 1,039 musketeers; and Weismann's corps, consisting of cavalry from Kabardia and Shirvan, as well as a battalion under Lieutenant colonel Blücher fired on the redoubt. All of these commanders were united under Pyotr Rumyantsev.

The redoubt was attacked by several columns of the Russian army. After a six-hour battle, the redoubt was occupied by Colonel Franz Klitschka and Lieutenant colonel Ziegler. Other commanders involved in the battle were: Major general Nikolai Kokovinsky; Colonels Mikhail Leontyev, Rosenberg, Yazykov; and Major Famintsyn. Welsh soldier Henry Lloyd also commanded a division for the Russians. Colonel Lukin was one of those killed in action. The Turks relentlessly fired on the redoubt for the entire day. In response, Rumyantsev began bombarding Silistra non-stop on 19 June with 74 field guns and numerous mortars, causing unabating fires to break out within the fortress.

=== Battle with Çerkes Pasha's relief force ===
By 28 June, a 7,000-strong force led by Cherkes (Turkish: Çerkes, lit. 'Circassian') Pasha arrived from Pazarcık. A battle followed between the troops of the pasha and the units of Pyotr Rumyantsev and Grigory Potemkin. During the battle, the Turks burst into a gap between the main Russian force and Potemkin's soldiers, putting Rumyantsev's life directly in danger. Fortunately for him, Aleksey Stupishin, who was marching to aid Rumyantsev, reached on time and repelled the Turkish attacks. Rumyantsev retreated to a nearby forest and sent cavalry regiments (mobilised from Moscow and Tver) to help Stupishin. After that, the Russians began to attack the lost positions and successfully returned them, putting the Turks to flight.

With Çerkes Pasha's force scattered, Potemkin chased after them with his cavalry regiments. Most of the Ottoman soldiers escaped through the road leading to Şumnu, which was patrolled by Major Egor Lyubimov. Cut off from the army, Lyubimov made his way through enemy territory with a small force and reached the main Russian army. He was injured in the process and died in 1778 from his numerous wounds.

=== Lifting of the siege ===
The Russians learned that Çerkes Pasha's army was only a detachment of Damat Numan Pasha's larger force of 20,000, which was marching from Şumnu towards Silistra. Thus, Pyotr Rumyantsev decided to lift the siege on 29 June and withdrew from the area to avoid another large confrontation. With this, the Russian campaign in Silistra ended in failure. In the six-hour battle on 18 June alone, German historian Joseph von Hammer-Purgstall claims that the Russians lost 8,000 men, whilst 1,000 were injured. Russian military historian Modest Bogdanovich, on the other hand, estimates the losses of the Russians on this day at 300, and the losses of the Turks at 600. Despite the Russian success in the battle with Çerkes Pasha's forces, the Turks achieved their main goal since Rumyantsev was forced to lift the siege. Thus, the siege of Silistra ended in an Ottoman victory.

== Aftermath ==
As the Russians were withdrawing from Silistra via the Danube, Pyotr Rumyantsev sent Otto Weismann to deal with Numan Pasha's reinforcements. In the ensuing battle, Weismann was fatally shot in the heart. Nevertheless, the battle ended in a Russian victory, with the Ottomans having lost 4,000–5,000 men.

Defeating renowned general Rumyantsev earned Serasker Osman Pasha not only the title of Gazi, but also a sable fur coat, a symbol of this great achievement. He was also given a sword and awarded 1,000 kuruş (which was equivalent to 500 gold coins). The Grand Vizier sent 4,000 silver medals, known as çelenk, and 3,000 feather (tüy) insignias to be distributed among the soldiers who defended Silistra.
