= Boil, Bulgaria =

Coordinates: 43°48′N 26°58′E

Boil (Bulgarian: Боил) is a village in northeastern Bulgaria. It is located in the Dulovo Municipality, Silistra District. In 2011 it had a population of 890 inhabitants.
