= 4th Infantry Division (Russian Empire) =

4th Infantry Division 4th Infantry Shock Division
- 4-я пехотная дивизия
- Active: 1806 – c. 1918
- Country: Russian Empire
- Branch: (Russian Empire) Russian Imperial Army
- Role: Infantry
- Size: approx. 20,000
- Garrison/HQ: Łomża
- Engagements: World War I

The 4th Infantry Division (Russian: 4-я пехотная дивизия, 4-ya pekhotnaya diviziya) was an infantry formation of the Russian Imperial Army that existed in various formations from 1806 until the end of World War I and the Russian Revolution. When the war broke out in 1914 it was based in Łomża. In June 1917, it was designated as the 4th Infantry Shock Division (4-я пехотная ударная дивизия) upon being reformed as a shock troop unit and the following month it became known as the 4th Infantry Shock Division of Death (4-я пехотная ударная дивизия смерти).

== History ==
The division was formed in 1806. In 1916, during World War I, the 4th Infantry Division took part in the Brusilov Offensive and was later reorganized as a "death" shock troop unit by General Aleksei Brusilov. It was demobilized around the time of the Russian Revolution and the subsequent unrest.

== Organization ==
Russian infantry divisions consisted of a staff, two infantry brigades, and one artillery brigade. The 4th Infantry Division was part of the 6th Army Corps as of 1914.

- 1st Brigade
  - 13th General Field Marshal Count Lacy's Belozersk Infantry Regiment
  - 14th His Majesty the King of Serbia's Olonets Infantry Regiment
- 2nd Brigade
  - 15th General Field Marshal Prince Nikita Repnin's Schlüsselburg Infantry Regiment
  - 16th Ladoga Infantry Regiment
- 4th Artillery Brigade

== Known commanders ==
	Name	From	To
1	Lieutenant General Vladislav Romishevsky	14.07.1872	4.11.1883
2	Lieutenant General Alexander Abramov (general)	4.11.1883	1.04.1884
3	Lieutenant General Alexander Bozheryanov	1.01.1886	?
4	Lieutenant General Mikhail Samokhvalov	11.08.1891	after 1.01.1893
5	Lieutenant General Yakov Grebenshchikov	21.02.1896	26.07.1899
6	Lieutenant General Ivan Fullon	5.08.1899	9.03.1900
7	Lieutenant General Nikolai Shatilov	24.11.1901	10.12.1902
8	Lieutenant General Vladimir Bukholts	10.12.1902	18.04.1903
9	Lieutenant General Ippolit Voishin-Mudras-Zhilinsky	6.04.1907	15.05.1912
10	Lieutenant General Nikolai Komarov	7.06.1912	1.04.1914
11	Lieutenant General Gavril Mileant	6.09.1914	29.09.1915

== Known chiefs of staff ==
	Name	From	To
1	Colonel Vladimir Yurovsky	27.09.1893	27.07.1894
2	Colonel Semyon Fyodorov	14.08.1894	27.08.1900
3	Colonel Vladimir Burkovsky	12.09.1902	14.12.1904
4	Colonel Tokarev	1.02.1913	?
5	Colonel Serbinovich	1.04.1914	?
6	Colonel Vasily Markovsky	6.01.1915	after 1.01.1916
7	Major General Alexander Treshchenkov	27.04.1916	3.01.1917
