= Kaynardzha Municipality =

Kaynardzha Municipality Община Кайнарджа
- Municipality
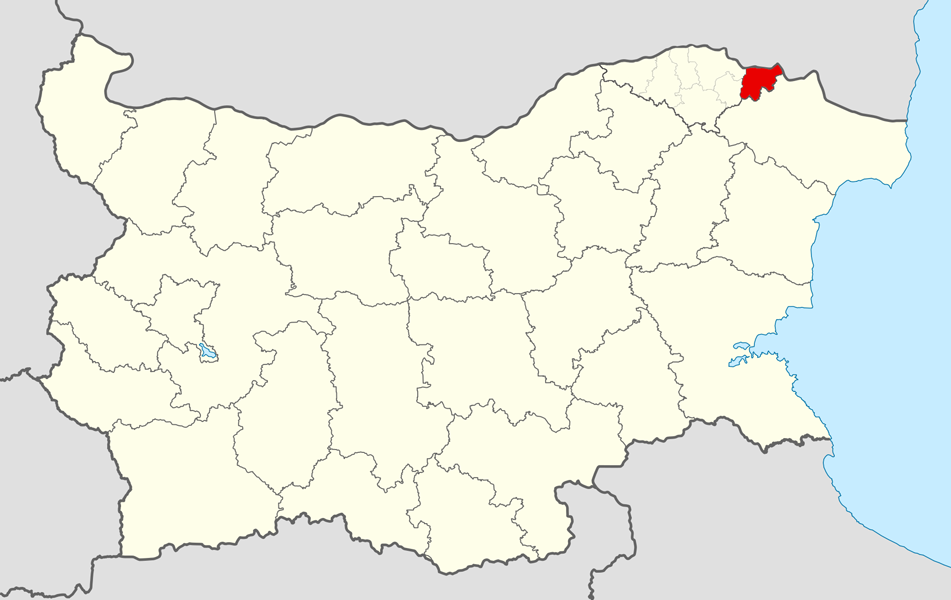
- Kaynardzha Municipality within Bulgaria and Silistra Province.
- Coordinates: 43°58′N 27°31′E
- Country: Bulgaria
- Province (Oblast): Silistra
- Admin. centre (Obshtinski tsentar): Kaynardzha

Area
  - Total: 314.96 km^{2} (121.61 sq mi)

Population (December 2017)▼
  - Total: 5,099
  - Density: 16.19/km^{2} (41.93/sq mi)
- Time zone: UTC+2 (EET)
  - Summer (DST): UTC+3 (EEST)

Kaynardzha Municipality (Bulgarian: Община Кайнарджа) is a municipality (obshtina) in Silistra Province, Northeastern Bulgaria, located in the Danubian Plain, in the area of the South Dobrudzha geographical region, bounded on the north with Romania. The Danube river is about 25 km away to the north through the Romanian territory. The area is named after its administrative centre – the village of Kaynardzha.

The municipality embraces a territory of 314.96 km^{2} with a population of 5,250 inhabitants, as of December 2009.

The main road II-71 crosses the area from northwest to southeast, connecting the province centre of Silistra with the city of Dobrich.

== Settlements ==
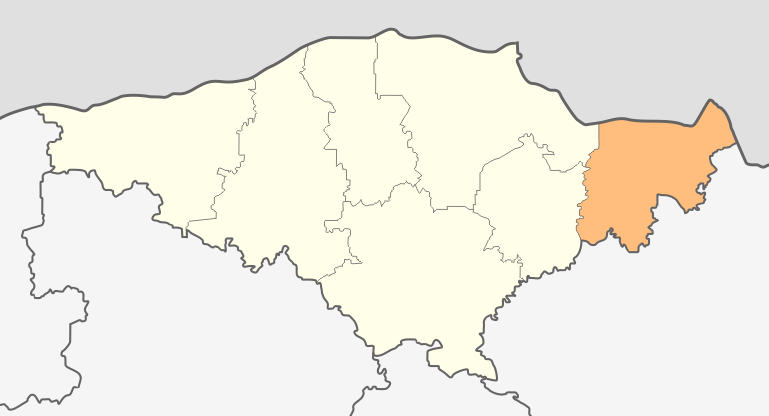
Kaynardzha Municipality within Silistra Province

Kaynardzha Municipality includes the following 15 places all of them villages:

Town/Village	Cyrillic	Population (December 2009)	Population (December 2016)
Kaynardzha	Кайнарджа	783	▼610
Davidovo	Давидово	177	▲200
Dobrudzhanka	Добруджанка	136	▼112
Golesh	Голеш	1,370	▲1,533
Gospodinovo	Господиново	40	n/a
Kamentsi	Каменци	47	n/a
Kranovo	Краново	173	▼89
Polkovnik Cholakovo	Полковник Чолаково	217	▲245
Poprusanovo	Попрусаново	41	n/a
Posev	Посев	153	▲166
Svetoslav	Светослав	133	▼96
Sredishte	Средище	1,318	▲1,363
Strelkovo	Стрелково	32	n/a
Voynovo	Войново	180	▼127
Zarnik	Зарник	450	▲496
Total		5,250	▼5,115

== Demography ==
The following table shows the change of the population during the last four decades.

Kaynardzha Municipality
Year	1975	1985	1992	2001	2005	2007	2009	2011
Population	8,487	6,467	6,128	5,467	5,409	5,367	5,250	5,070
Sources: Census 2001, Census 2011, „pop-stat.mashke.org“,

=== Demographic indicators ===
As of 2016, it is one of the few places in Bulgaria with a natural population growth: there were a total of 87 live births, while 66 people died. The crude birth rate is 17.0‰, while the crude death rate is around 12.9‰. The municipality of Kaynardzha has a total fertility rate of 2.57 children per woman, which is much higher than the average for the country (1.54 children per woman).

	Population	Live births	Deaths	Natural growth	Birth rate (‰)	Death rate (‰)	Natural growth rate (‰)
2000	6,157	84	99	−15	13.6	16.1	−2.4
2001	5,485	89	103	−14	16.2	18.8	−2.6
2002	5,427	70	98	−28	12.9	18.1	−5.2
2003	5,419	85	102	−17	15.7	18.8	−3.1
2004	5,391	99	92	+7	18.4	17.1	+1.3
2005	5,409	79	83	−4	14.6	15.3	−0.7
2006	5,401	91	85	+6	16.8	15.7	+1.1
2007	5,367	78	71	+7	14.5	13.2	+1.3
2008	5,300	87	72	+15	16.4	13.6	+2.8
2009	5,250	89	73	+16	17.0	13.9	+3.0
2010	5,175	92	80	+12	17.8	15.5	+2.3
2011	5,059	81	93	−12	16.0	18.4	−2.4
2012	5,081	80	73	+7	15.7	14.4	+1.4
2013	5,102	95	68	+27	18.6	13.3	+5.3
2014	5,096	79	54	+25	15.5	10.6	+4.9
2015	5,107	71	61	+10	13.9	11.9	+2.0
2016	5,115	87	66	+21	17.0	12.9	+4.1
2017	5,099	80	85	−5	15.7	16.7	−1.0
2018	5,076	61	63	−2	12.0	12.4	-0.4

=== Ethnic groups ===
Turks form the majority of the population of Kaynardzha Municipality. Bulgarians constitutie the largest minority, followed by a large Roma population.

Ethnic groups in Kaynardzha Municipality (2011 census)
Ethnic group	Percentage
Bulgarians	30.1%
Turks	53.7%
Roma	15.5%
others and indefinable	0.7%

=== Religion ===
In 2011, about 67.8% of the total population declared to be Muslim. The municipality of Kaynardzha has the highest share of Shia people in Bulgaria: around 52% of the population declared to be Shia in the census of 2001. About 27% of the population belong to the Bulgarian Orthodox Church.

Population of Kaynardzha (municipality) by religion
Muslims	67.8%
Orthodox	27.4%
No religion	2.3%
Protestants	0.1%
prefer not to answer	2.2%

=== Age structure ===
The municipality of Kaynardzha has a very young population compared to other places in Bulgaria.

Population pyramid 2016 (est.)
%	Males	Age	Females	%
1.33		80+		1.43
0.98		75–79		1.45
1.66		70–74		2.29
2.11		65–69		2.23
2.29		60–64		2.21
2.50		55–59		2.44
3.23		50–54		2.39
3.42		45–49		3.58
3.05		40–44		3.03
3.36		35–39		2.89
3.52		30–34		2.82
4.29		25–29		3.40
3.62		20–24		3.52
3.54		15–19		3.19
3.93		10–14		3.85
4.34		5–9		4.34
3.73		0–4		4.09

== See also ==
- Provinces of Bulgaria
- Municipalities of Bulgaria
- List of cities and towns in Bulgaria
