= 13th Belozersk Infantry Regiment =

- 13-й Белозерский пехотный полк
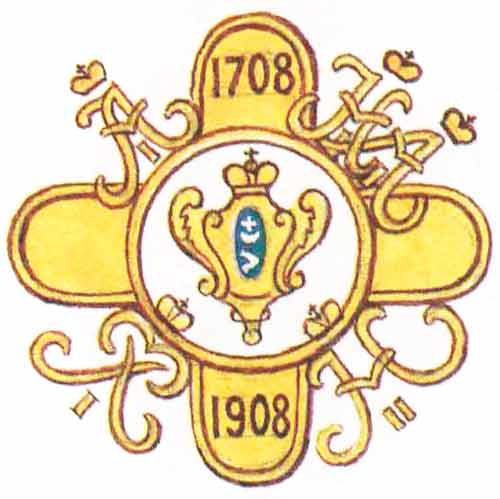
- Active: 1708–1918
- Country: Russian Empire
- Branch: (Russian Empire) Russian Imperial Army
- Role: Infantry
- Garrison/HQ: Łomża
- Patron: Sergei Volkonsky
- Anniversaries: 6 December
- Engagements: Great Northern War; Seven Years' War; Russo-Turkish War (1768–74); Russo-Swedish War (1788–90); Finnish War; Crimean War; November Uprising; World War I

The 13th Belozersk Infantry Regiment, or 13th General Field Marshal Prince Volkonsky's Infantry Regiment (Russian: 13-й пехотный Белозерский генерал-фельдмаршала князя Волконского полк), was an infantry regiment of the Russian Empire's Imperial Russian Army. It was known by different names for much of its existence but most of its designations included "Belozersk Infantry Regiment." Formed in 1708 in the reign of Czar Peter the Great and disbanded in 1918, the regiment fought in the Great Northern War, the Russian campaign of 1812, the War of the Sixth Coalition, the suppression of the Polish November Uprising, and the Crimean War, among other conflicts.

== History ==
The 13th Belozersk celebrated its anniversary on 6 December, the feast day of Saint Nicholas, although it was actually formed on Beshankovichy as Prince Repnin's Grenadier Regiment on 10 March 1708. The regiment was formed from the grenadier companies of the Shlisselburg, Butyr, Yaroslavl, Nizhny Novgorod, Belgorod, Neva, Yamburg, and Tver Regiments. Late that year, it was renamed Teyler's Grenadier Regiment, and in 1709 the future Belozersk Regiment became Lacy's Grenadier Regiment, after Peter Lacy. The regiment fought in the Great Northern War with Sweden, and on 27 June 1709 participated in the Battle of Poltava, where Peter the Great decisively defeated Charles XII of Sweden's army. In 1711 it fought in the Pruth River Campaign against the Ottoman Empire, the first of many campaigns against that empire that the regiment participated in.

On 13 November 1727, regiment was renamed the Belozersk Infantry Regiment, in honor of the town of Belozersk.

During the Battle of Warsaw in September 1831, the regiment participated in the attack on Ordon's Redoubt. Remains of its soldiers were found at the archaeological site at the redoubt.

Belozersk Regiment officer Lieutenant Colonel Fyodor Stepanovich Sozanowicza (5 February 1829–28 August 1867) is buried in the Działoszyn cemetery.

On 25 March 1891, the 13th became the "13th General Field Marshal Count Lacy's Belozersk Infantry Regiment," after Peter Lacy. In 1914, the regiment was stationed at Łomża. On 1 January 1914, the regiment was part of the 1st Infantry Brigade of the 4th Infantry Division of the 6th Army Corps, all three also headquartered at Łomża. On 19 March, its name was changed to the "13th General Field Marshal Prince Volkonsky's Belozersk Infantry Regiment," after Sergey Volkonsky.

== Bibliography ==
- Расписание Сухопутных войск 1836—1914 годов [Directory of the Army, 1836–1914] (in Russian). St. Petersburg: Типографни Генерального штаба [General Staff Printing House]. 1914.
- Caban, Wiesław (2001). Służba rekrutów Królestwa Polskiego w armii carskiej w latach 1831-1873 [Service of Recruits from Congress Poland in the Tsar's Army, 1831–1873] (in Polish). Warsaw: Wydawnictwo DiG. ISBN 83-7181-209-4.
- Kersnovsky, Anton Antonovich (1994). История русской армии [History of the Russian Army] (in Russian). Vol. 4. Moscow: Golos. ISBN 9785711700593.
