= Sarichioi =

- Commune
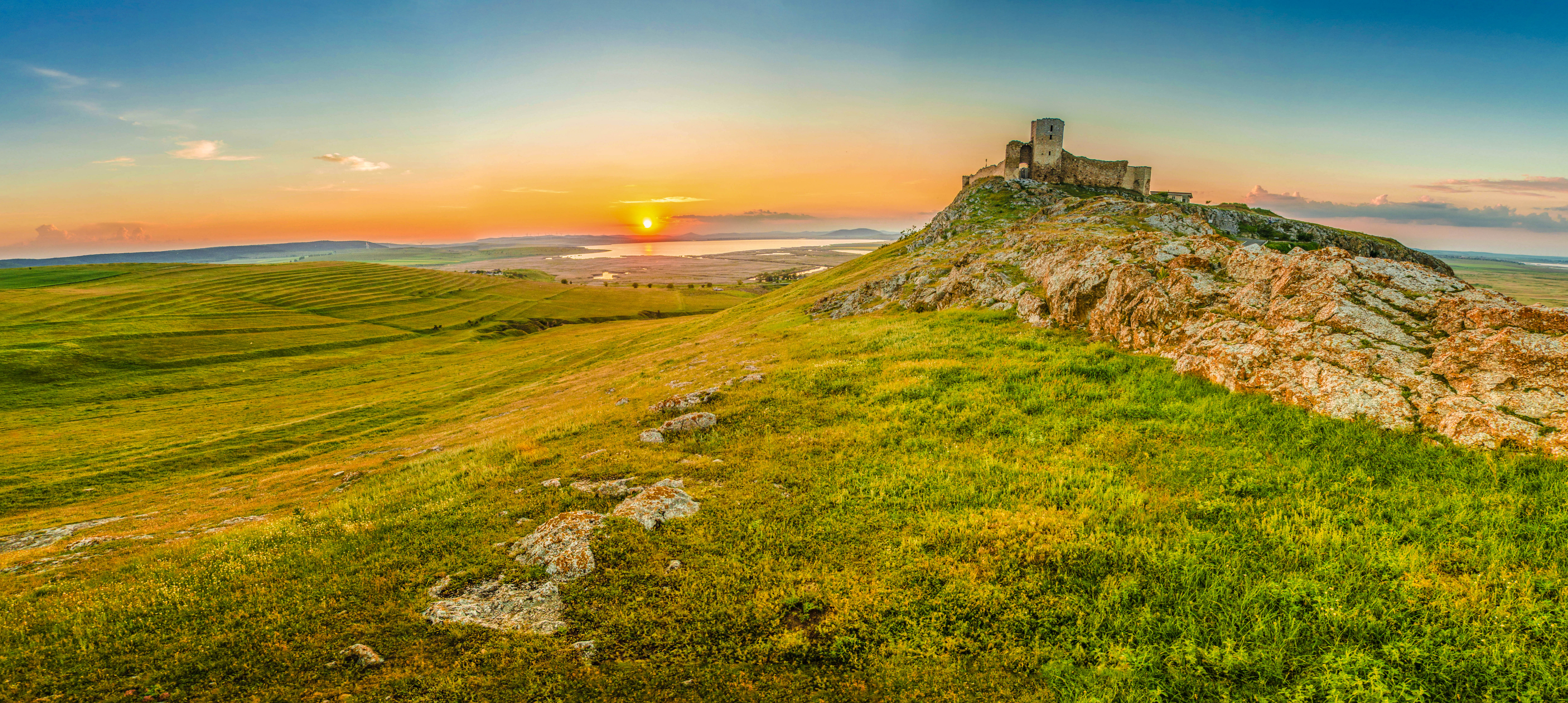

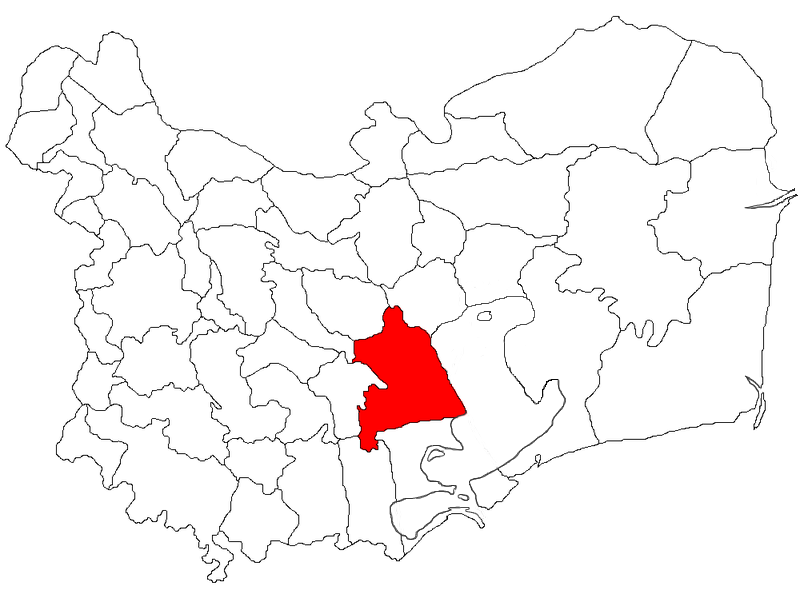
- Location in Tulcea County

- Location in Romania
- Coordinates: 44°57′N 28°51′E
- Country: Romania
- County: Tulcea
- Subdivisions: Sarichioi, Enisala, Sabangia, Visterna, Zebil

Government
  - Mayor (2024–2028): Vitali-Cristian Finoghen (PSD)
- Area: 282.38 km^{2} (109.03 sq mi)
- Elevation: 33 m (108 ft)
- Population (2021-12-01): 5,226
  - Density: 18.51/km^{2} (47.93/sq mi)
- Time zone: UTC+02:00 (EET)
  - Summer (DST): UTC+03:00 (EEST)
- Postal code: 827190
- Area code: +40 x40
- Vehicle reg.: TL
- Website: primariasarichioi.ro

Sarichioi (Russian: Сарикёй, from Turkish: Sarıköy, "Yellow Village" ) is a commune in Tulcea County, Northern Dobruja, Romania. It is composed of five villages: Enisala, Sabangia, Sarichioi, Zebil, and Visterna. Besides the ethnic Romanian majority (56.4% of the population), the commune is home to a sizeable Lipovan community (43.1%).

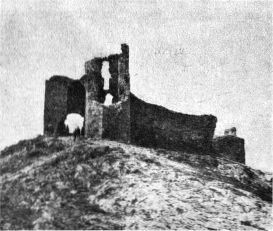
Ruins of the Enisala fortress in the early 20th century

The village of Enisala (Turkish: Yeni Sala, Bulgarian: Ново село, "New Village") is the site of a fortress dominating nearby lakes (previously gulfs) of Razelm and Babadag. Dated to the late 13th or the beginning of the 14th century, it was built to control the travel routes that passed through the region. The fortress' three hexagonal towers are the only ones of this type found in the whole region of Dobruja. There are several competing theories regarding its builders. On the one hand, some historians consider that its architecture is reminiscent of the Western manner of planning, and attribute it either to the Genoese, who held several trading posts in the area, or to the Byzantines, who intermittently controlled the region. On the other hand, other historians consider the towers very similar to ones found in Tsepina, Shumen, Perperikon, Vidin, consequently attributing it to Bulgarians, who are also known to have controlled the region at certain times during the probable period of construction. All written mentions of the fortress postdate its abandonment, making a definite attribution improbable. The castle was first conquered by the Ottomans in 1388/1389, and retaken in 1416/1417 after a brief Wallachian rule. Due to the new political situation and the development of sand spits that hampered trade, the fortress gradually decayed, and was finally abandoned around the end of the 15th century.

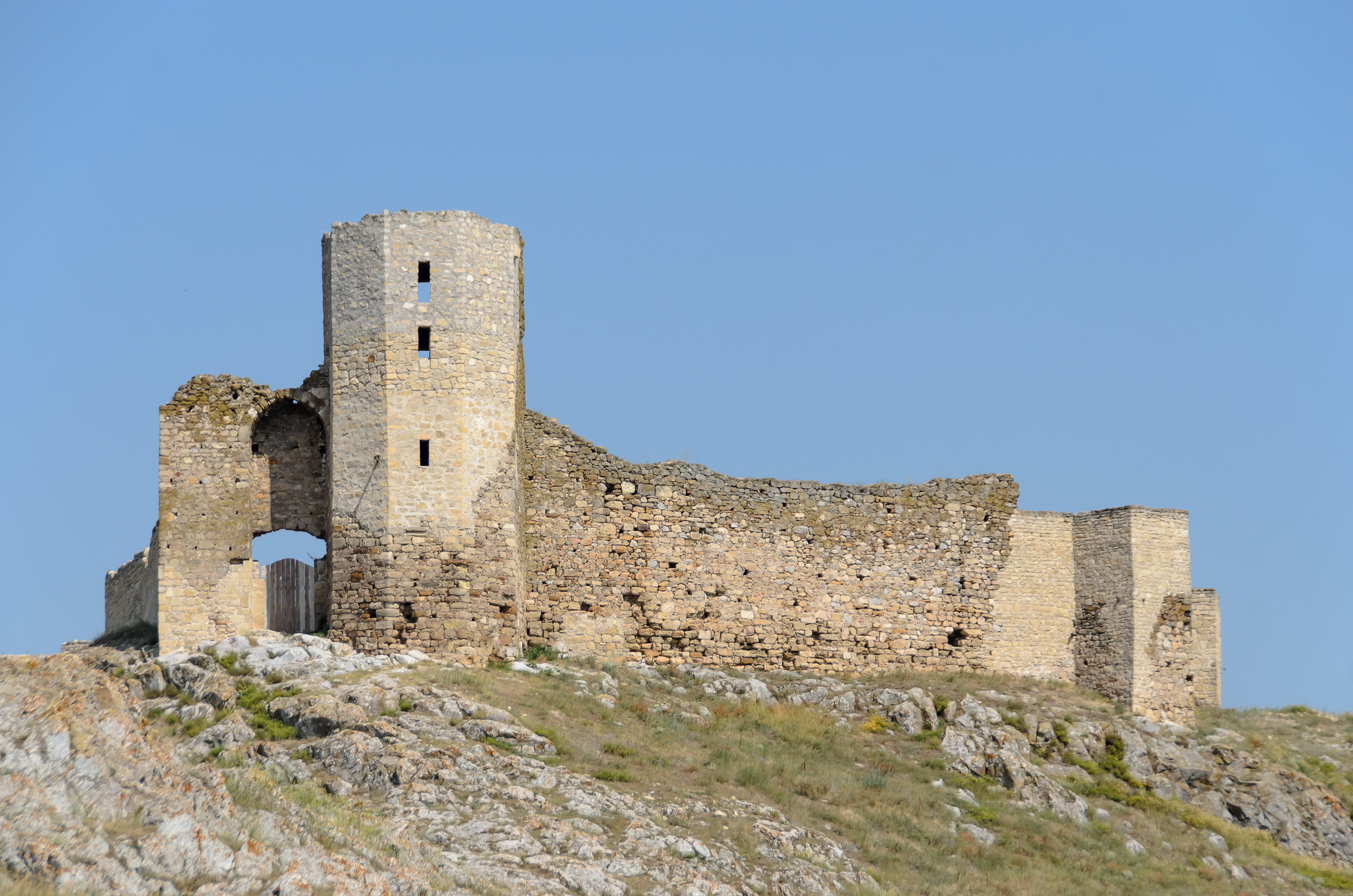
Ruins of the Enisala fortress in the summer of 2012

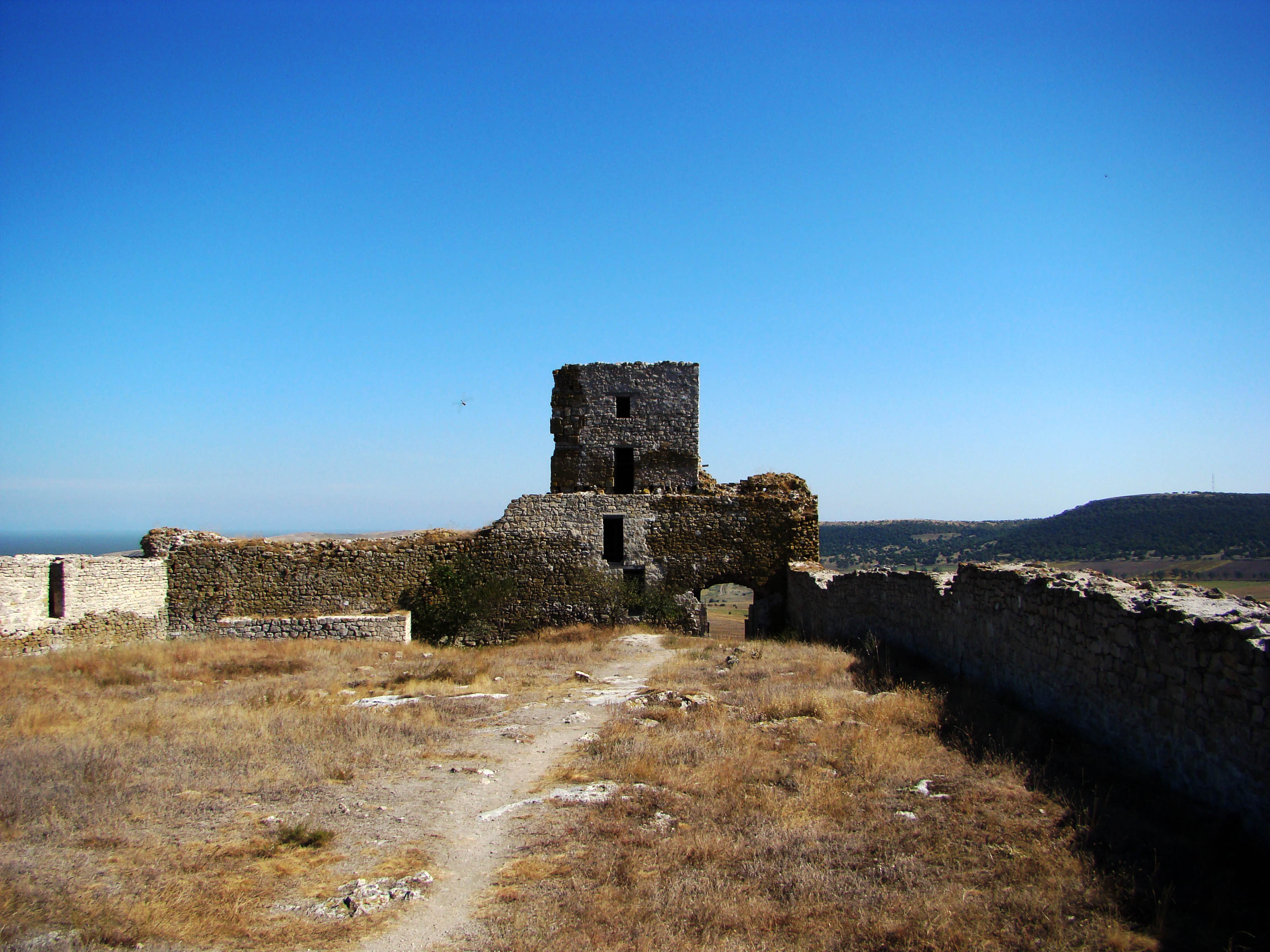
Enisala Fortress inside the walls, looking to the former main gate, summer of 2010

== Natives ==
- Mihail Moruzov (1887–1940), founder and first head of Romania's modern domestic espionage agency

== See also ==
- List of castles in Romania
- Tourism in Romania
