= Chernik =

Chernik, also spelled Chernick or Czernik, is a surname. Notable people with the surname include:

- Alison Chernick, American writer/director and filmmaker
- Edward Czernik (born 1940), Polish athlete
- Jonas Chernick (born 1973), Canadian actor and screenwriter
- Syarhey Chernik (born 1988), Belarusian footballer

== See also ==
- Ruda-Czernik, village in Poland
