= Silistra Province =

Province in northeastern Bulgaria

Coordinates: 43°55′N 27°10′E

Silistra Province Област Силистра
- Province
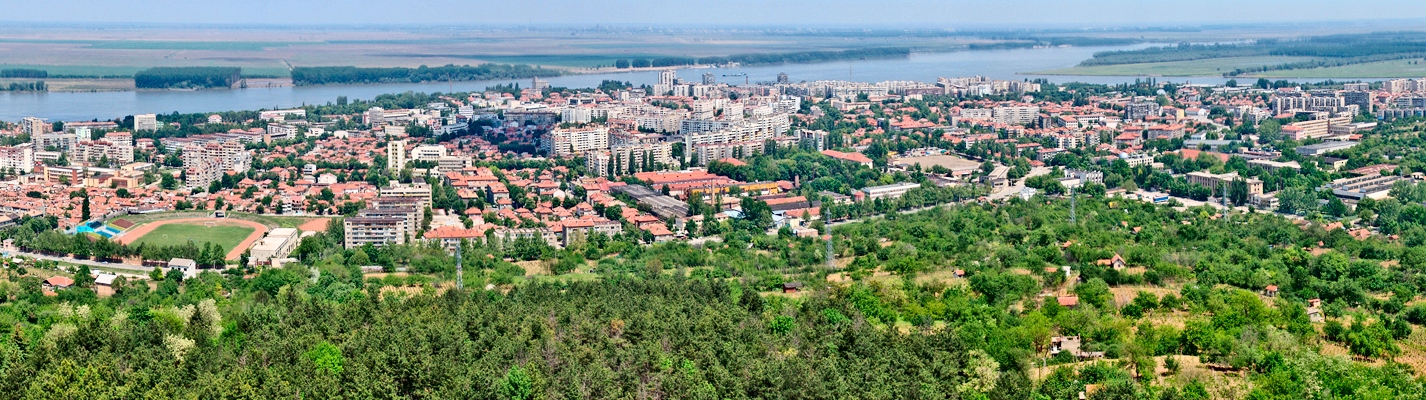
- City of Silistra on the Danube River

- Flag Coat of arms

- Location of in Bulgaria
- Country: Bulgaria
- Capital: Silistra
- Municipalities: 7

Area
  - Total: 2,846.3 km^{2} (1,099.0 sq mi)

Population (2021)
  - Total: 97,770
  - Density: 34.35/km^{2} (88.97/sq mi)
- Time zone: UTC+2 (EET)
  - Summer (DST): UTC+3 (EEST)
- License plate: CC
- Website: silistra.government.bg

Silistra Province (Bulgarian: Област Силистра, Oblast Silistra) is a province of Bulgaria. Formerly known as the Silistra okrug, it is located on the northeast corner of Bulgaria. The province is part of the Southern Dobrudja region, with its largest and major city being Silistra. As of 2021, the province had a population of 97,770 inhabitants, making it the second least populated in the country. It is divided into seven municipalities for administrative purposes.

== History ==
During the reign of the Roman Empire in the first century BCE, the province was the location of the Roman fortress of Durostorum, and a major river port on the Danube river. In the 3rd century, it was subject of multiple attacks by the Goths. The Slavs invaded and captured the region in the 6th century. During the late Middle Ages, it was part of the First and Second Bulgarian Empires, until it fell to the Ottomans as a result of the Bulgarian–Ottoman wars of the late 14th century. It was later involved in the conflicts between the Ottoman and Russian Empires. As a part of Southern Dobruja, the region was included in the Principality of Bulgaria, following the liberation of the country in 1878. It was occupied by Romania during the Second Balkan War in 1913 and remained in Romania until 1940, when it was returned to Bulgaria.

== Geography ==
Silistra is one of the 28 provinces of Bulgaria. It was formerly known as the Silistra okrug. It shares borders with the provinces of Dobrich, Shumen, Razgard, and Rousse, and an international border with Romania.

The province is situated on the eastern end of the Danube river plains. The river is used for navigation, and irrigation purposes. It has a continental climate with hot dry summers and cool winters. The Srebarna Lake in the province is a national reserve and a UNESCO World Heritage Site.

=== Sub-divisions ===
The province is divided into seven municipalities–Alfatar, Dulovo, Glavinitsa, Kaynardzha Municipality, Silistra, Sitovo, and Tutrakan. The largest is the municipality of Silistra.

Historical population

Year	Pop.	±%
1946	152,287	—
1956	163,572	+7.4%
1965	170,442	+4.2%
1975	175,754	+3.1%
1985	174,122	−0.9%

Year	Pop.	±%
1992	161,063	−7.5%
2001	142,000	−11.8%
2011	119,474	−15.9%
2021	97,770	−18.2%

Source: Bulgarian National Statistical Institute

Municipality	Cyrillic	Population	Largest town
Alfatar	Алфатар	3,324	Alfatar
Glavinitsa	Главиница	12,610	Glavinitsa
Dulovo	Дулово	28,860	Dulovo
Kaynardzha	Кайнарджа	5,250	Kaynardzha
Silistra	Силистра	54,885	Silistra
Sitovo	Ситово	5,810	Sitovo
Tutrakan	Тутракан	16,920	Tutrakan

== Demographics ==
Ethnic groups in Silistra Province
Ethnic group	Percentage
Bulgarians	56.0%
Turks	37.4%
Romani	5.2%
others and indefinable	1.4%

Religions in Silistra Province
Religious group	Percentage
Christianity	54.3%
Islam	42.6%
others and indefinable	3.1%

As of 2021, the province had a population of 97,770 inhabitants, making it the second least populated in the country. The population consisted of 45,648 males and 49,091 females. About 12,497 inhabitants were below the age of fourteen. About 55.5% of the population was rural, while the rest were classified as urban. Bulgarians formed the major ethnic group with 56% of the population, and Turks formed a significant minority with 37.4% of the population. Romani people constituted about 5.2% of the inhabitants. Christianity had 45,638 adherents (54.3%), followed by Islam at 35,767 adherents (42.6%).

== Economy ==
The soil is fertile and rich in humus, and conducive to agriculture. About 50% of the land is arable, and major crops include cereals, vegetables and apricots. The Danube river is used for fishing. Major industries include machine tools, electronics, woodworking, textiles, and food processing.

== Infrastructure ==
The region is well connected with more than 500 km (310 mi) of roads, with major roads connecting to the neighboring provinces. There is a road border crossing with neighbouring Romania. There is a small civilian airfield at Silistra. All settlements in the province have the supply of electricity. There is a teacher training institute apart from the schools imparting education at various levels. Medical services are provided by a regional and several district hospitals.

== See also ==
- Provinces of Bulgaria
- List of villages in Silistra Province
