= Still (disambiguation) =

A still is an apparatus used to distill liquid mixtures.

Still may also refer to:

== Film, television, and theater ==
- Film still, a photograph taken on the set of a film or television show and used for promotional purposes
- Still frame, one single image chosen from a film or video for preview or similar purposes
- Still (1971 film), a 1971 American experimental film by Ernie Gehr
- Still (2014 film), a 2014 British drama directed by Simon Blake
- Still Mine (working title Still), a 2012 Canadian film
- "Still" (Adventure Time), a 2011 TV episode
- "Still" (The Walking Dead), a 2014 TV episode
- Still (play), a 2013 play by Jen Silverman

== Music ==
=== Albums ===
- Still (BeBe & CeCe Winans album) or the title song, 2009
- Still (Bill Anderson album) or the title song (see below), 1963
- Still (BoDeans album), 2008
- Still (Erika de Casier album), 2024
- Still (Joy Division album), 1981
- Still (Michael Learns to Rock album), 2018
- Still (Nine Inch Nails album), included with some versions of And All That Could Have Been, 2002
- Still (Pete Sinfield album) or the title song, 1973
- Still (Richard Thompson album), 2015
- Still (SWV album) or the title song, 2016
- Still (Tony Banks album), 1991
- Still (Mazzy Star EP) or the title song, 2018
- Still (Vision of Disorder EP), 1995
- Still, by Wolverine, 2006
- Still, by Young Chop, 2014

=== Songs ===
- "Still" (Bill Anderson song), 1963
- "Still" (Commodores song), 1979
- "Still" (Karol G and Bruno Mars song), 2026
- "Still" (Katy B song), 2014
- "Still" (Lead song), 2012
- "Still" (Macy Gray song), 1999
- "Still" (Tamia song), 2004
- "Still" (Tim McGraw song), 2010
- "Still" (TVXQ song), 2012
- "Still..., by Ai, 2010
- "Still", by Alanis Morissette from Dogma: Music from the Motion Picture, 1999
- "Still", by Axium from Blindsided, 2003
- "Still", by Ben Folds from the Over the Hedge film soundtrack, 2006
- "Still", by Black Midi from Hellfire, 2022
- "Still", by Bombay Bicycle Club from A Different Kind of Fix, 2011
- "Still", by Brian McKnight from Superhero, 2001
- "Still", by Cher from Not Commercial, 2000
- "Still", by DaBaby from Baby on Baby 2, 2022
- "Still", by Daughter from If You Leave, 2013
- "Still", by Dierks Bentley from Gravel & Gold, 2023
- "Still", by Dove Cameron from Alchemical: Volume 1, 2023
- "Still", by Elvis Costello from North, 2003
- "Still", by Foo Fighters from In Your Honor, 2005
- "Still", by G-Eazy, 2016
- "Still", by Geddy Lee from My Favourite Headache, 2000
- "Still", by the Geto Boys from The Resurrection, 1996
- "Still", by Hillsong Church from Hope, 2003
- "Still", by Karl Denver, 1963
- "Still", by Kehlani from Kehlani, 2026
- "Still", by Lasgo from Far Away, 2010
- "Still", by LaVern Baker, 1956
- "Still", by Luke Combs from Gettin' Old, 2023
- "Still", by Niall Horan from Heartbreak Weather, 2020
- "Still", by Noah Kahan from Stick Season, 2022
- "Still", by Teyana Taylor from The Album, 2020

== People ==
- Still (surname), a list of people with the name
- Benjamin Stillingfleet (1702–1771), English botanist; taxonomic author abbreviation Still.

== Places ==
- Still, Bas-Rhin, Alsace, France
- Still, El Oued, Algeria

== Other uses ==
- Aeros Still, an ultralight trike wing design
- STILL Gmbh, a German subsidiary of the KION Group that manufactures forklift trucks
- Still life, a work of art depicting mostly inanimate subject matter

== See also ==
- Stihl, a German power-tool manufacturer
- Stil (disambiguation)
- Stille (disambiguation)
- Stiller (disambiguation)
- Stills (disambiguation)
- Systemic-onset juvenile idiopathic arthritis, or Still's disease
  - Adult-onset Still's disease
