= ST2 =

ST2 may refer to:

- Ducati ST2, an Italian sport touring motorcycle
- ST2, the postcode district of the ST postcode area covering Bentilee, Abbey Hulton, and Bucknall
- ST2 receptor, or IL1RL1, an interleukin receptor protein
- ST2 cardiac biomarker, a novel biomarker of cardiac stress
- Sound Transit 2, a joint ballot measure to expand and improve Washington state's Puget Sound public transport system
- Star Trek II: The Wrath of Khan, a 1982 American science fiction film released by Paramount Pictures
- Star Trek Into Darkness, a 2013 film
- Starship Troopers 2: Hero of the Federation, second film in the Starship Troopers film series
- Zoda's Revenge: StarTropics II, a video game released only in North America in 1994
- ST-2, a telecommunications satellite in geosynchronous orbit, launched in 2011

== See also ==
- 2ST, radio station in NSW, Australia
- 2nd Street (disambiguation)
- STII (disambiguation)
- STT (disambiguation)
- STST (disambiguation)
