= Still (surname) =

Still is a surname. Notable people with the name include:

- Alexa Still (born 1963), New Zealand-born flutist
- Alfred Still (1869–1963), British electrical engineer
- Alicia Lloyd Still (1869–1944), British nurse, teacher and hospital matron
- Andrew Still (actor) (born 1993), Scottish actor
- Andrew Taylor Still (1828–1917), American physician and founder of osteopathy
- Art Still (born 1955), American professional football player; brother of Valerie (below)
- Bryan Still (born 1974), American professional football player
- Clyfford Still (1904–1980), American artist and painter
- Eric Still (born 1967), American football player
- George Frederic Still (1868–1941), English pediatrician and author
- James Still (poet) (1906–2001), American poet, novelist and folklorist
- John Still (c. 1540–1608), English clergyman
- Judith Still (born 1958), English academic
- Ken Still (1935–2017), American professional golfer
- Mary Still (born 1954), American politician
- Melly Still (born 1962), British director, designer and choreographer
- Nanny Still (1926–2009), Finnish designer
- Ray Still (1920–2014), American classical oboist
- Robert Still (cricketer) (1822–1907), early Australian cricketer
- Robert Still (1910–1971), English composer, educator and amateur tennis player
- S. S. Still (1852–1931), American osteopathic physician
- Shawn Still, listed as secretary for Georgia on false slate of Trump electors
- Susan Still (women's rights activist) (born 1964), American women's rights activist
- Susan Still Kilrain (born 1961), American astronaut
- Tarheeb Still (born 2002), American football player
- Valerie Still (born 1961), American professional basketball player; sister of Art (above)
- William Grant Still (1895–1978), African-American classical composer
- William Joseph Still (1870–?), English engineer
- William Still (1821–1902/21–1902), African-American abolitionist

== Fictional ==
- Clark Still, from the 1986 arcade game Ikari Warriors
