= Astegolimab =

Monoclonal antibody

Monoclonal antibody
- Type: ?

Clinical data
- Other names: AMG282; AMG-282
- Routes of administration: SC, IV

Legal status
- Legal status: Investigational

Identifiers
- CAS Number: 2173054-79-8
- UNII: 27TW751DTH

Astegolimab is a selective ST2 IgG2 monoclonal antibody developed to treat asthma and chronic obstructive pulmonary disease. It is expected to be efficacious for patients with low eosinophil count. It is developed by Genentech/Roche.
