= Susan Still =

Susan Still may refer to:

- Susan Still Kilrain (born 1961), American astronaut
- Susan Still (women's rights activist) (born 1964), American women's rights activist
