= Black Swan (film) =

2010 film by Darren Aronofsky

- Theatrical release poster
- Directed by: Darren Aronofsky
- Screenplay by: Mark Heyman; Andres Heinz; John McLaughlin
- Story by: Andres Heinz
- Produced by: Mike Medavoy; Arnold W. Messer; Brian Oliver; Scott Franklin
- Starring: Natalie Portman; Vincent Cassel; Mila Kunis; Barbara Hershey; Winona Ryder
- Cinematography: Matthew Libatique
- Edited by: Andrew Weisblum
- Music by: Clint Mansell
- Production companies: Cross Creek Pictures; Protozoa Pictures; Phoenix Pictures
- Distributed by: Fox Searchlight Pictures
- Release dates: September 1, 2010 (Venice); December 17, 2010 (United States)
- Running time: 108 minutes
- Country: United States
- Language: English
- Budget: $13 million
- Box office: $332.1 million

Black Swan is a 2010 American psychological horror film directed by Darren Aronofsky, from a screenplay by Mark Heyman, John McLaughlin, and Andres Heinz, and based on a story by Heinz. Starring Natalie Portman, Vincent Cassel, Mila Kunis, Barbara Hershey, and Winona Ryder, the film follows a production of Tchaikovsky's Swan Lake by the company of New York City Ballet, led by Artistic Director Thomas Leroy (Cassel). The production requires a ballerina to play the innocent and fragile White Swan, for which the committed dancer Nina Sayers (Portman) is a perfect fit, as well as the dark and sensual Black Swan, which are qualities better embodied by the new rival Lily (Kunis). Nina is overwhelmed by immense pressure when she finds herself competing for the role, causing her to lose her tenuous grip on reality and descend into madness.

Aronofsky conceived the premise by connecting his viewings of a production of Swan Lake with an unrealized screenplay regarding understudies and the notion of being haunted by a double, similar to the folklore surrounding doppelgängers. Aronofsky cites Fyodor Dostoevsky's The Double as another inspiration for the film. Aronofsky also considered Black Swan a companion piece to his film The Wrestler (2008), with both films revolving around demanding performances for different kinds of art. He and Portman first discussed the project in 2000, and after a brief attachment to Universal Pictures, Black Swan was produced in New York City in late 2009 by Fox Searchlight Pictures. Portman and Kunis trained in ballet for several months prior to filming.

Black Swan premiered at the 67th Venice International Film Festival on September 1, 2010, and had a limited release in the United States starting on December 3, before opening in wide release on December 17. Upon release, the film received widespread acclaim from critics, with praise toward Aronofsky's direction and the performances of Portman, Kunis, and Hershey. It also emerged as a major commercial success at the box office, grossing $332.1 million worldwide on a $13 million budget. The film received five nominations at the 83rd Academy Awards, including Best Picture and Best Director for Aronofsky, with Portman winning Best Actress; it also received four nominations at the 68th Golden Globe Awards, including Best Motion Picture – Drama and Best Director for Aronofsky, with Portman winning Best Actress in a Motion Picture – Drama. In 2021, Portman's performance was included in The New Yorker's list of the best film performances of the 21st century.

== Plot ==
Nina Sayers, an introverted young dancer employed by the New York City Ballet, lives with her overprotective mother, Erica, a former ballerina. After forcing the current principal dancer, Beth MacIntyre, into retirement due to her age, artistic director Thomas Leroy announces that the company is opening the season with Tchaikovsky's Swan Lake and he is looking for a new dancer for the dual roles of the innocent and fragile White Swan, Odette, and the dark and sensual Black Swan, Odile. When Nina visits the dressing room previously occupied by Beth, she steals Beth's lipstick.

At the auditions, Nina gives a flawless performance as Odette, but struggles to embody Odile. The arrival of newcomer Lily in the middle of Nina's audition causes her to lose her balance during her fouettés. As a result, Thomas passes on Nina for the lead role and she returns home to her mother devastated. Later that night, Nina practices her fouettés in front of a mirror, but she pushes too hard and breaks her toenail. While tending to her injury, Erica reassures Nina that everything will be okay by tomorrow morning. Determined to win the lead role, Nina meets with Thomas in his office the next morning and asks him to reconsider.

Thomas seemingly dismisses Nina and claims he has chosen Veronica, but he challenges her to change his mind. When Thomas critiques Nina's strengths and weaknesses as a dancer, he forcibly kisses her. She responds by biting his lips and apologizes before running out of his office. Nina congratulates Veronica, but Veronica accuses Nina of cruelly pranking her before storming off. Confused, Nina sees the cast list and learns she has been cast in the lead role. At a gala celebrating the new season, Thomas announces Nina as the company's new principal dancer as well as Beth's retirement and final performance, causing Beth to walk out.

An intoxicated Beth confronts Nina and accuses her of providing sexual favors to Thomas in exchange for the role. At Thomas's loft, he asks Nina questions about her sex life before suggesting that she masturbate to loosen her inhibitions. Nina does so the next morning, but stops upon seeing her mother asleep in a chair next to her. During rehearsals, Nina and the rest of the company learn that Beth has been hospitalized. Thomas reveals to Nina that Beth was hit by a car, convinced that she had attempted suicide. Nina visits Beth in hospital and is distraught to see her injured legs, having been permanently paralyzed.

Thomas and Nina observe Lily, who has a physical resemblance to Nina but also an uninhibited quality that Nina lacks. As opening night nears, Nina begins having hallucinations and finds scratch marks on her back. Following a sensual one-on-one rehearsal between Nina and Thomas, he admonishes her for her lack of progress. Nina learns from Thomas that he was told by Lily to go easy on her, leading to a falling out between the two dancers. Later that night, Lily arrives at Nina's apartment and apologizes for talking to Thomas. Wanting to make it up to her, Lily invites Nina to go out for drinks and she accepts despite Erica's objections.

While dining with two men, Lily offers Nina an ecstasy capsule, which Nina rejects, but Lily pours the drug into Nina's drink. Ignoring several missed phone calls from her mother, Nina changes her mind and consumes the drink. At a nightclub, Nina and Lily dance very close to each other as Nina hears voices calling her name. Nina briefly hooks up with a stranger in a bathroom stall, but she abruptly stops and leaves the nightclub with Lily joining her outside. They take a taxi back to Nina's apartment as Lily fingers her in the backseat. Upon returning, Erica confronts Nina for coming home late as well as consuming drugs and alcohol.

When Nina brags about having a threesome with the two men she and Lily had dinner with, Erica slams Nina against the wall. In response, Nina and Lily lock themselves in Nina's bedroom and begin passionately kissing and undressing each other. As Lily performs oral sex on Nina, she has a hallucination of Lily's tattoo of a pair of wings moving before Lily appears to suffocate Nina with a pillow. Nina awakens the next morning disoriented and alone, realizing that she is late for rehearsal after Erica chose not to wake her up. Nina arrives at the studio to find Lily dancing as Odile, her performance impressing Thomas and the other dancers.

Nina confronts Lily about their sexual encounter, but Lily denies that it ever happened and teases Nina for fantasizing about her. Nina becomes convinced Lily intends to replace her, especially after learning that Thomas has made Lily her alternate. When Nina voices her concerns to Thomas, he tells her not to worry about Lily and reassures her that the role is hers. Nina's mysterious injuries and hallucinations grow more severe as she believes she is transforming into a black swan. Nina visits Beth again and apologizes for taking her lipstick as she tries to empathize with her. Now in a wheelchair and wallowing in her misery, Beth takes a nail file and repeatedly stabs herself in the face.

Nina arrives home and sees a hallucination of Beth and becomes frantic. Erica grows increasingly concerned about Nina's mental health, and when she refuses to leave her daughter's bedroom, Nina forces her out, slamming the door on her mother's hand. Nina then loses consciousness. She awakens on opening night as Erica attempts to prevent her from performing, having removed her bedroom doorknob the previous night. Nina manages to retrieve the doorknob as she finally stands up to her mother before leaving. Nina arrives backstage as Lily is about to take the stage as Odette, having been asked by Thomas to take over the role. Unfazed by Thomas's objections, Nina alludes to Beth's forced retirement as she prepares in her dressing room.

With no time left to announce Lily as her replacement, Thomas allows Nina to take back her role. During the performance, Nina hallucinates again as she faces the audience and loses her balance during a lift, causing the dancer playing Prince Siegfried to drop her. After Thomas reprimands both dancers for the mishap, Nina returns to her dressing room and finds Lily preparing to play Odile. As she taunts Nina, she appears to transform into her doppelgänger. Enraged, Nina slams Lily into a mirror, breaking it and shattering into pieces. While being choked, Nina's neck grows longer and she stabs Lily with a shard of glass, killing her and breaking the illusion.

After Nina hides Lily's body, she hyperventilates before regaining her composure as her eyes turn red. Nina takes the stage as Odile and dances flawlessly, losing herself as she seemingly turns into a black swan. Amidst a standing ovation from the audience, Nina surprises Thomas with a passionate kiss. In her dressing room, Nina switches back into Odette, but is interrupted by Lily, who congratulates Nina for her performance. Nina sees the mirror is still broken, but all other evidence of the stabbing is gone, including Lily's body. She looks down and pulls a piece of glass from her abdomen, realizing she had stabbed herself and not Lily.

Despite her injury, Nina dances the final act with blood gradually seeping through her costume as Erica tearfully watches from the audience. The show ends with Nina jumping from the set onto a hidden mattress to simulate Odette throwing herself off a cliff. The audience erupts in thunderous applause while Thomas, Lily, and the other dancers gather to congratulate Nina backstage. Thomas and Lily eventually notice Nina bleeding profusely and Thomas tells the other dancers to get help, asking Nina what happened. Nina calmly replies: "I felt it. Perfect. It was perfect", as the audience chants her name and the screen fades to white.

== Cast ==
During the closing credits, the major cast members are credited both as their film characters as well as their corresponding characters from Swan Lake.

- Natalie Portman as Nina Sayers/The White Swan, a ballerina for the NYC ballet who strives for perfection while struggling with stress and various traumatic issues
- Mila Kunis as Lily/The Black Swan, an experienced ballerina transferred to the company and seen as a threat to Nina
- Vincent Cassel as Thomas Leroy/The Gentleman, the sexually predatory Artistic Director
- Barbara Hershey as Erica Sayers/The Queen, Nina's overprotective mother and a retired ballerina
- Winona Ryder as Elizabeth "Beth" MacIntyre/The Dying Swan, a star prima ballerina who was forced into retirement
- Benjamin Millepied as David Moreau/Prince Siegfried, Nina's dance partner
- Ksenia Solo as Veronica/Little Swan, a ballerina who was originally Thomas's first pick for the lead in Swan Lake
- Kristina Anapau as Galina/Little Swan
- Janet Montgomery as Madeline/Little Swan
- Sebastian Stan as Andrew/Suitor
- Toby Hemingway as Tom/Suitor
- Sergio Torrado as Sergio/Von Rothbart
- Mark Margolis as Mr. Fithian/Patron
- Tina Sloan as Mrs. Fithian/Patron

== Production ==
=== Conception ===
Darren Aronofsky first became interested in ballet when his sister studied dance at the High School of Performing Arts in New York City. The basic idea for the film started when he hired screenwriters to rework a screenplay called The Understudy, which portrayed off-Broadway actors and explored the notion of being haunted by a double. Aronofsky said the screenplay had elements of All About Eve (1950), Roman Polanski's The Tenant (1976), and Fyodor Dostoyevsky's novella The Double. The director had also seen numerous productions of Swan Lake, and he connected the duality of the White Swan and the Black Swan to the script. When researching for the production of Black Swan, Aronofsky found ballet to be "a very insular world" whose dancers were "not impressed by movies". Regardless, the director found active and inactive dancers to share their experiences with him.

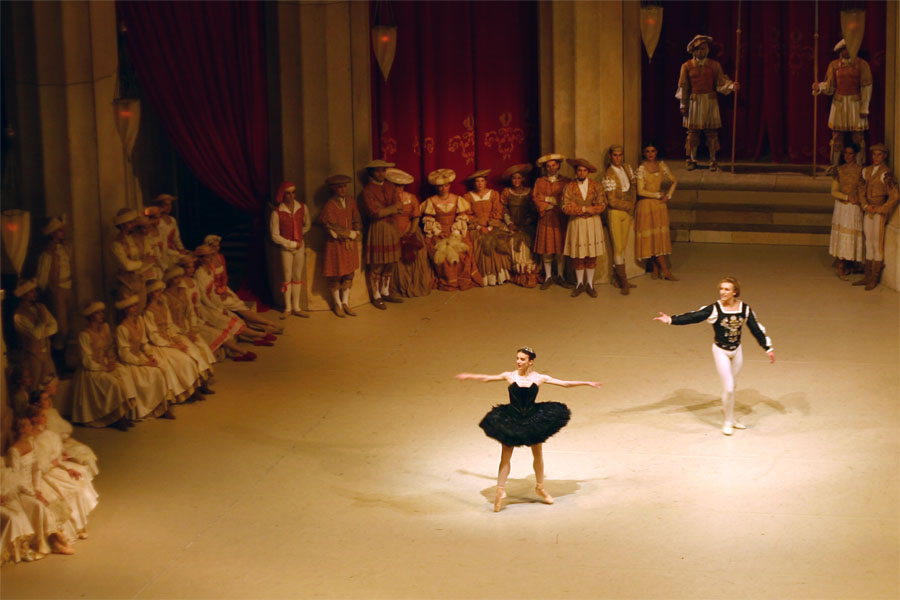
The scene from the ballet Swan Lake in which the Black Swan (Odile) tricks and seduces the Prince

He also stood backstage to see the Bolshoi Ballet perform at the Lincoln Center for the Performing Arts.

Aronofsky called Black Swan a companion piece to his previous film The Wrestler, recalling one of his early projects about a love affair between a wrestler and a ballerina. He eventually separated the wrestling and the ballet worlds as "too much for one movie". He compared the two films: "Wrestling some consider the lowest art—if they would even call it art—and ballet some people consider the highest art. But what was amazing to me was how similar the performers in both of these worlds are. They both make incredible use of their bodies to express themselves." About the psychological thriller nature of Black Swan, actress Natalie Portman compared the film's tone to Polanski's 1968 film Rosemary's Baby, while Aronofsky said Polanski's Repulsion (1965) and The Tenant (1976) were "big influences" on the final film. Actor Vincent Cassel also compared Black Swan to Polanski's early works and additionally compared it to David Cronenberg's early works.

=== Casting ===
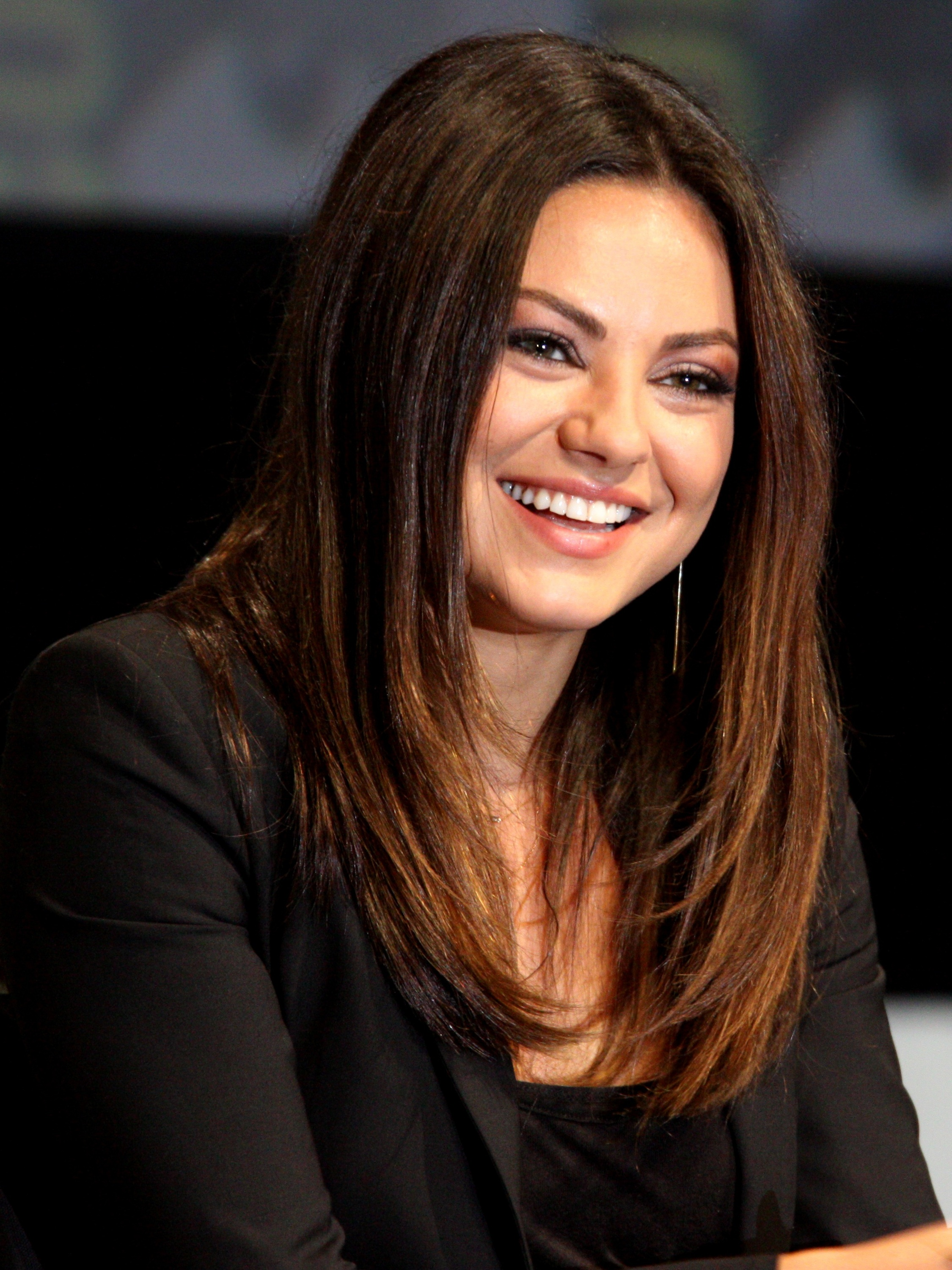
Mila Kunis was first approached to star in Black Swan in 2008.

Aronofsky first discussed with Natalie Portman the possibility of a ballet film in 2000, finding out she was interested in playing a ballet dancer. Portman explained being part of Black Swan, "I'm trying to find roles that demand more adulthood from me because you can get stuck in a very awful cute cycle as a woman in film, especially being such a small person." Portman suggested to Aronofsky that her good friend Mila Kunis would be perfect for the role. Kunis contrasted Lily with Nina, "My character is very loose ... She's not as technically good as Natalie's character, but she has more passion, naturally. That's what [Nina] lacks." The female characters are directed in the Swan Lake production by Thomas Leroy, played by Cassel. He compared his character to George Balanchine, who co-founded New York City Ballet and was "a control freak, a true artist using sexuality to direct his dancers".

Portman and Kunis started training six months before the start of filming in order to attain a body type and muscle tone more similar to those of professional dancers. Portman worked out for five hours a day, doing ballet, cross-training, and swimming. A few months closer to filming, she began choreography training. Kunis engaged in cardio and Pilates, "train[ing] seven days a week, five hours, for five, six months total, and ... was put on a very strict diet of 1,200 calories a day". She lost 20 pounds (9 kg) from her normal weight of about 117 pounds (53 kg), and reported that Portman "became smaller than I did". Kunis said, "I did ballet as a kid, like every other kid does ballet. You wear a tutu and you stand on stage and you look cute and twirl. But this is very different because you can't fake it. You can't just stay in there and like pretend you know what you're doing. Your whole body has to be structured differently." Georgina Parkinson, a ballet mistress from the American Ballet Theatre (ABT), coached the actors in ballet. ABT soloists Sarah Lane and María Riccetto served as "dance doubles" for Portman and Kunis, respectively. Dancer Kimberly Prosa also served as a double for Portman. She stated: "Natalie took class, she studied for several months, from the waist up is her. Sarah Lane, a soloist at ABT, did the heavy tricks, she did the fouettés, but they only had her for a limited time, a couple of weeks, so I did the rest of whatever dance shots they needed."

In addition to the soloist performances, members of the Pennsylvania Ballet were cast as the corps de ballet, backdrop for the main actors' performances. Also appearing in the film are Kristina Anapau, Toby Hemingway, Sebastian Stan, and Janet Montgomery.

=== Development and filming ===
Aronofsky and Portman first discussed a ballet film in 2000, after the release of his second film Requiem for a Dream (2000), though the script had not yet been written. He told her about a love scene between competing ballet dancers, and Portman recalled, "I thought that was very interesting because this film is in so many ways an exploration of an artist's ego and that narcissistic sort of attraction to yourself and also repulsion with yourself." On the decade's wait before production, she said, "The fact that I had spent so much time with the idea ... allowed it to marinate a little before we shot." Portman and Kunis described filming the intimate scenes between Nina and Lily as challenging because they were close friends. Aronofsky unsuccessfully tried to heighten the rivalry between their characters by encouraging conflict between Portman and Kunis.

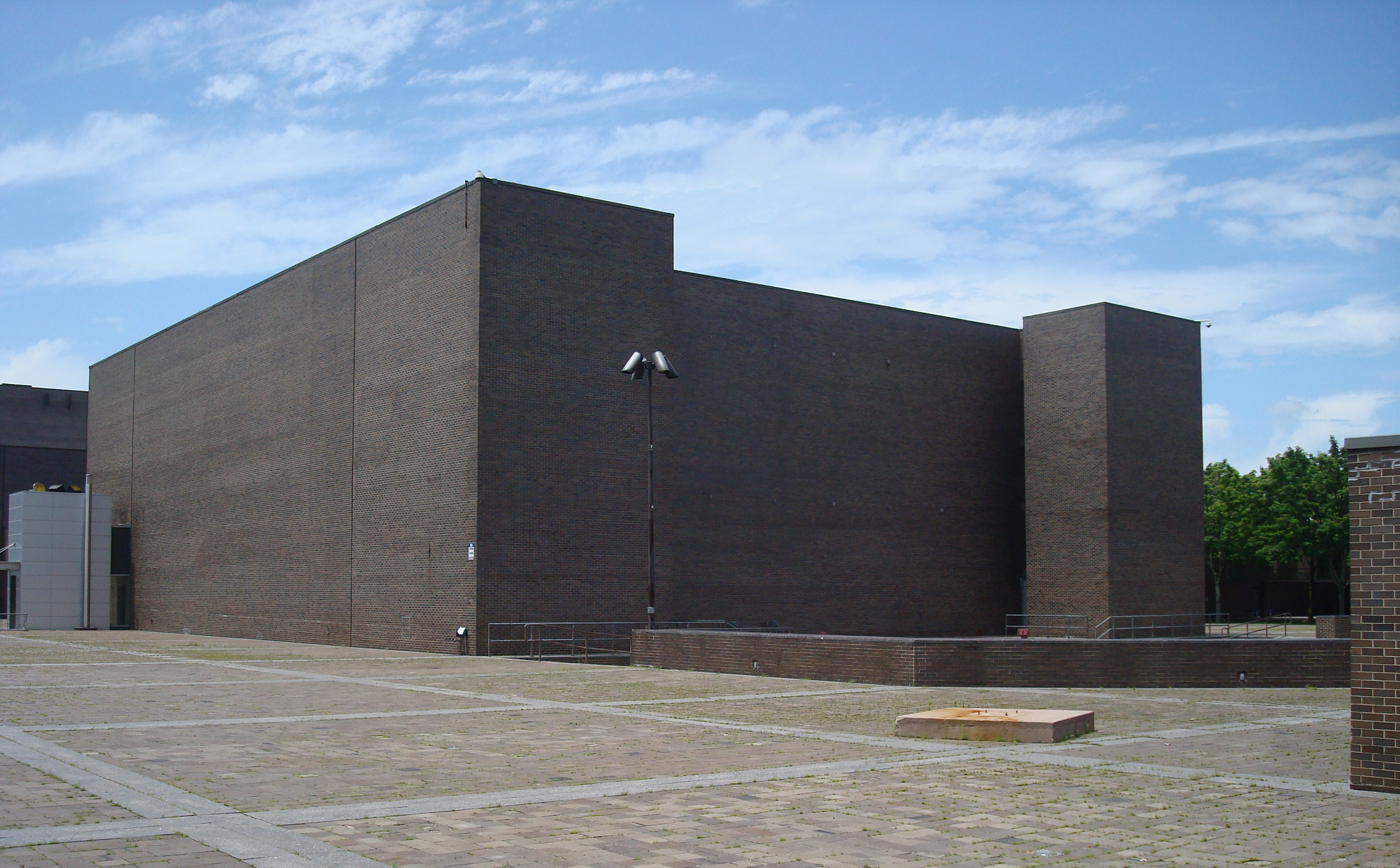
Part of the filming took place at the State University of New York at Purchase Performing Arts Center

The screenplay The Understudy was written by Andres Heinz; Aronofsky first heard about it while editing Requiem for a Dream and described it as "All About Eve with a double, set in the off-Broadway world". After making The Fountain (2006), Aronofsky and producer Mike Medavoy had screenwriter John McLaughlin rewrite The Understudy; Aronofsky said McLaughlin "took my idea of Swan Lake and the ballet and put [the story] into the ballet world and changed the title to Black Swan". When Aronofsky proposed a detailed outline of Black Swan to Universal Pictures, the studio decided to fast-track development of the project in January 2007. The project "sort of died, again" according to Aronofsky, until after the making of The Wrestler (2008), when he had Mark Heyman, director of development of Aronofsky's production company Protozoa Pictures, write for Black Swan "and made it something that was workable". By June 2009, Universal had placed the project in turnaround, generating attention from other studios and specialty divisions, particularly with actress Portman attached to star. Black Swan began development under Protozoa Pictures and Overnight Productions, the latter financing the film. In July 2009, Kunis was cast.

Fox Searchlight Pictures distributed Black Swan and gave the film a production budget of $10–12 million. Principal photography was achieved using Super 16 mm cameras and began in New York City toward the end of 2009. Part of filming took place at the Performing Arts Center at State University of New York at Purchase. Aronofsky filmed Black Swan with a muted palette and a grainy style, which he intended to be similar to The Wrestler. Aronofsky said:

I like Super 16 because the cameras are really light, really moveable. Also, for The Wrestler, it was a money-saving thing. The film stocks on 35 mm would become so glossy that they'd get close to what people are doing on video. I wanted to go back to the grainy, vérité cinema feel of The Wrestler ... Like with wrestling, ballet is shot in wide shot with two shots on the side, and no one really brought the camera—well, wrestling—into the ring or for us, onto the stage and into the practice room. I really wanted the camera to dance, but I was nervous about shooting a psychological thriller/horror film with a hand-held camera. I couldn't think of another example where they did that ... Steadicams are very different than hand-helds, because hand-held gives you that vérité feel. I was concerned if that would affect the suspense, but after a while I said, "Screw it, let's go for it."

Cinematographer Matthew Libatique shot the film on 16 mm film.

=== Soundtrack ===
The non-original music featured in Black Swan consists of music by Tchaikovsky featuring performances on-screen and in the soundtrack by violinist Tim Fain and a track of electronica dance music by English production duo the Chemical Brothers. It marks the fifth consecutive collaboration between Aronofsky and English composer Clint Mansell, who composed the original score for the film. Mansell attempted to score the film based on Tchaikovsky's ballet but with radical changes to the music. Because of the use of Tchaikovsky's music, the score was deemed ineligible to be entered into the 2010 Academy Awards for Best Original Score.

The Chemical Brothers' music, which is featured prominently during the club scene in the film, is omitted from the soundtrack album.

== Release ==
Black Swan had its world premiere as the opening film at the 67th Venice Film Festival on September 1, 2010. It received a standing ovation whose length Variety said made it "one of the strongest Venice openers in recent memory". The festival's artistic director Marco Mueller had chosen Black Swan over The American (starring George Clooney) for opening film, saying, "[It] was just a better fit ... Clooney is a wonderful actor, and he will always be welcome in Venice. But it was as simple as that." Black Swan screened in competition and is the third consecutive film directed by Aronofsky to premiere at the festival, following The Fountain (2006) and The Wrestler.

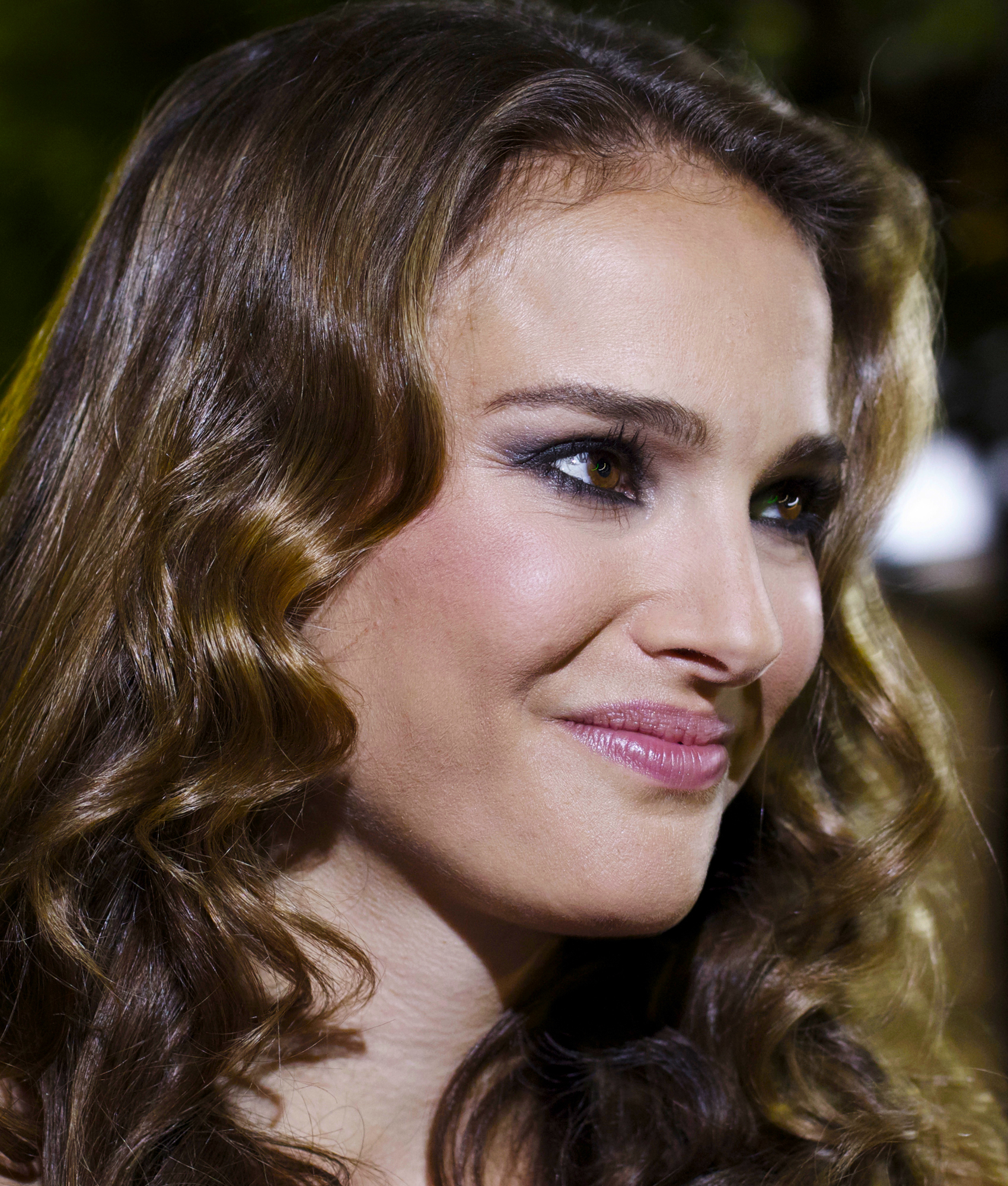
Portman at a premiere for the film at the 2010 Toronto International Film Festival

Black Swan was presented in a sneak screening at the Telluride Film Festival on September 5, 2010. It also had a Gala screening at the 35th Toronto International Film Festival later in the month. In October 2010, Black Swan was screened at the New Orleans Film Festival, the Austin Film Festival, and the BFI London Film Festival. In November 2010, the film was screened at American Film Institute's AFI Fest in Los Angeles, the Denver Film Festival and Camerimage Festival in Bydgoszcz, Poland.

The release of Black Swan in the United Kingdom was preponed from February 11 to January 21, 2011. According to The Independent, the film was considered one of "the most highly anticipated" films of 2010. The newspaper then compared it to the 1948 ballet film The Red Shoes in having "a nightmarish quality ... of a dancer consumed by her desire to dance".

The film was re-released, remastered exclusively for IMAX to celebrate its 15th anniversary on August 21, 2025 and August 24, 2025.

=== Home media ===
Black Swan was released on DVD and Blu-ray in Region 1/Region A on March 29, 2011. The Region 2/Region B version was released on May 16, 2011.

== Reception ==
=== Box office ===
Black Swan had a limited release in select cities in North America on December 3, 2010, in 18 theaters and was a surprise box office success. The film took in a total of $415,822 on its opening day, averaging $23,101 per theater. By the end of its opening weekend it grossed $1,443,809—$80,212 per theater. The per location average was the second highest for the opening weekend of 2010 behind The King's Speech. The film is Fox Searchlight Pictures' highest per-theater average gross ever, and it ranks 21st on the all-time list. On its second weekend the film expanded to 90 theaters, and grossed $3.3 million, ranking it as the sixth film at the box-office. In its third weekend, it expanded again to 959 theaters and grossed $8,383,479. The film went on to gross over $106 million in the United States and over $329 million worldwide.

=== Critical response ===
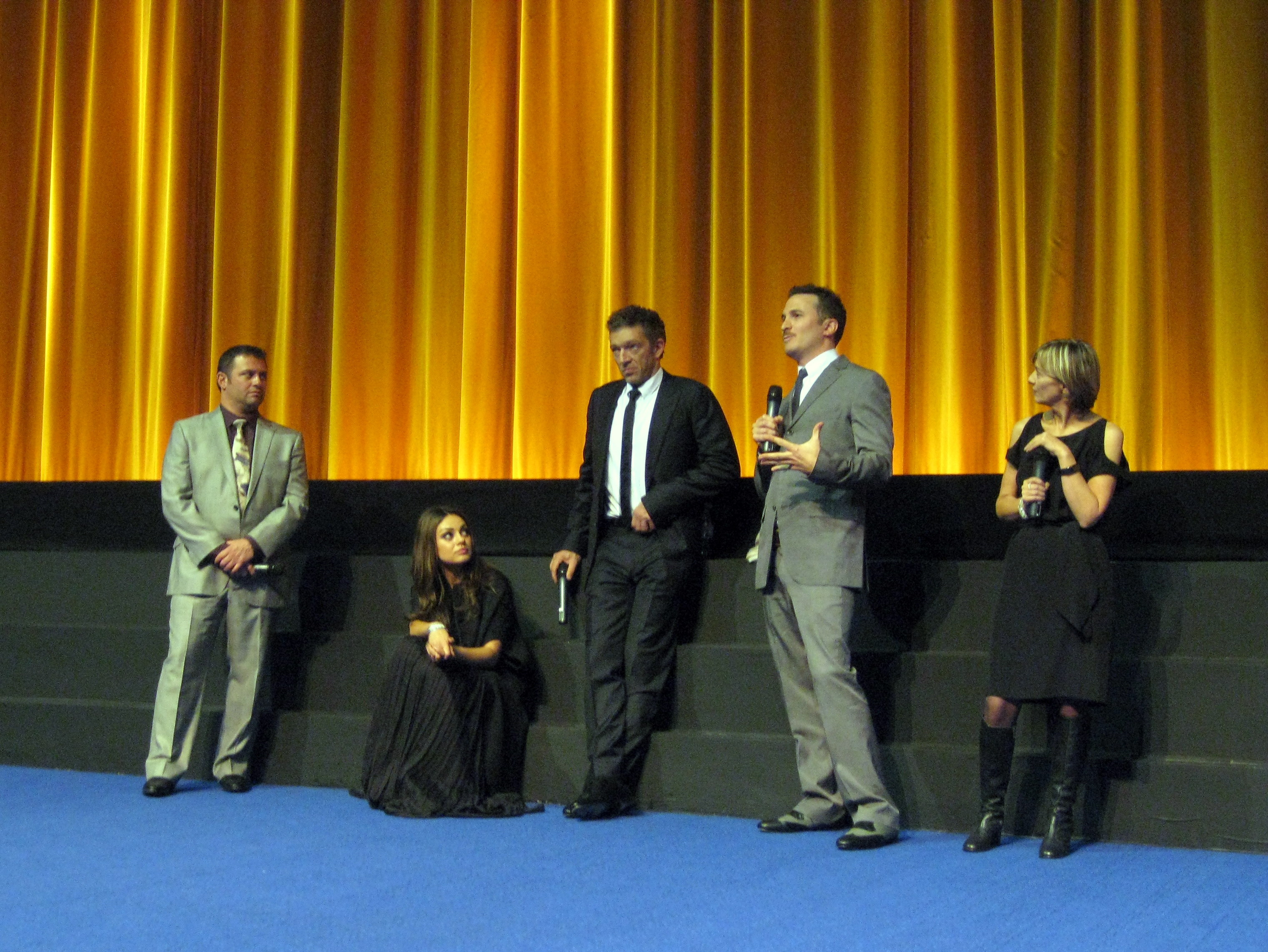
Black Swan cast and crew (L–R: producer Scott Franklin, actress Mila Kunis, actor Vincent Cassel, director Darren Aronofsky) discuss the film with Sandra Hebron at the BFI London Film Festival, where it was nominated for Best Film.

Black Swan received positive reviews from critics upon release, with praise toward Aronofsky's direction and the performances of Portman, Kunis and Hershey.

Review aggregator Rotten Tomatoes gives the film an approval rating of 85% based on 318 reviews, and an average rating of 8.20/10. The website's critical consensus reads, "Bracingly intense, passionate, and wildly melodramatic, Black Swan glides on Darren Aronofsky's bold direction—and a bravura, tour-de-force performance from Natalie Portman." At Metacritic, which assigns a weighted average score out to reviews, the film received an average score of 79 out of 100, based on 42 critics, indicating "generally positive reviews".

In September 2010, Entertainment Weekly reported that based on reviews from the film's screening at the Venice Film Festival, "[Black Swan] is already set to be one of the year's most love-it-or-hate-it films." Leonard Maltin, on his blog Movie Crazy, admitted that he "couldn't stand" the film, despite highly praising Portman's performance. Reuters described the early response to the film as "largely positive", with Portman's performance being highly praised. The Sydney Morning Herald reported that "the film divided critics. Some found its theatricality maddening, but most declared themselves 'swept away'."

Kurt Loder of Reason called the film "wonderfully creepy", and wrote that "it's not entirely satisfying; but it's infused with the director's usual creative brio, and it has a great dark gleaming look". Mike Goodridge from Screen Daily called Black Swan "alternately disturbing and exhilarating" and described the film as a hybrid of The Turning Point (1977) and Polanski's films Repulsion (1965) and Rosemary's Baby (1968). Goodridge described Portman's performance, "[She] is captivating as Nina ... She captures the confusion of a repressed young woman thrown into a world of danger and temptation with frightening veracity." The critic also commended Cassel, Kunis, and Hershey in their supporting roles, particularly comparing Hershey to Ruth Gordon in the role of "the desperate, jealous mother". Goodridge praised Libatique's cinematography with the dance scenes and the psychologically "unnerving" scenes: "It's a mesmerising psychological ride that builds to a gloriously theatrical tragic finale as Nina attempts to deliver the perfect performance."

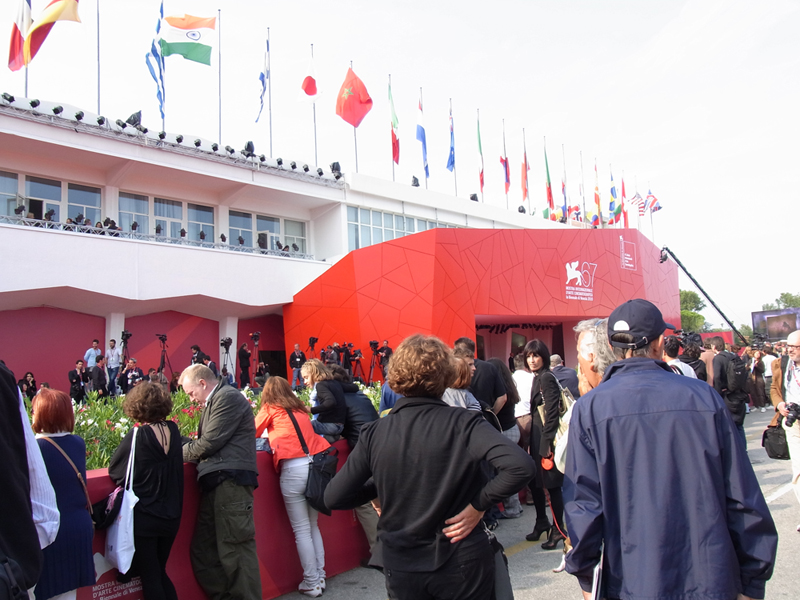
Black Swan opened at the 67th Venice International Film Festival, making it the third consecutive Aronofsky film to be screened at the ceremony. It was nominated for the Golden Lion and Mila Kunis won the Marcello Mastroianni Award.

Kirk Honeycutt of The Hollywood Reporter gave the film a mixed review. He wrote, "[Black Swan] is an instant guilty pleasure, a gorgeously shot, visually complex film whose badness is what's so good about it. You might howl at the sheer audacity of mixing mental illness with the body-fatiguing, mind-numbing rigors of ballet, but its lurid imagery and a hellcat competition between two rival dancers is pretty irresistible." Honeycutt commended Millepied's "sumptuous" choreography and Libatique's "darting, weaving" camera work. The critic said of the thematic mashup, "Aronofsky ... never succeeds in wedding genre elements to the world of ballet ... White Swan/Black Swan dynamics almost work, but the horror-movie nonsense drags everything down the rabbit hole of preposterousness." Similarly, in a piece for The Huffington Post, Rob Kirkpatrick praised Portman's performance but compared the film's story to that of Showgirls (1995) and Burlesque (2010) while concluding Black Swan is "simply higher-priced cheese, Aronofsky's camembert to [Burlesque director Steve] Antin's cheddar". Vulture's Kyle Buchanan also noted the similarities of the film's plot to the widely derided Showgirls, and said that the director Darren Aronofsky "owes a feather-tip to Paul Verhoeven's exploitation classic more than [he] might be willing to admit".

The film has been criticized for its portrayal of ballet and ballet dancers. Upon the film's release in the United Kingdom, The Guardian interviewed four professional ballet dancers in the UK: Tamara Rojo, Lauren Cuthbertson, Edward Watson, and Elena Glurjidze. Rojo called the film "lazy ... featuring every ballet cliche going". Watson felt that the film "makes [ballet] look so naff and laughable. It doesn't show why ballet is so important to us—why we would want to try so hard." The Canadian Press also reported that many Canadian ballet dancers felt that the film depicted dancers negatively and exaggerated elements of their lives but gave Portman high marks for her dance technique. In an interview with the Los Angeles Times, Gillian Murphy, a principal dancer with American Ballet Theatre praised the visual elements of the film but noted that the film presentation of the ballet world was "extreme".

==== Perfect Blue comparison ====
Several critics noted striking similarities between Satoshi Kon's 1997 anime film Perfect Blue and Aronofsky's Black Swan. In response to comparisons between Perfect Blue and Black Swan, Aronofsky acknowledged the similarities in 2010, but denied that Black Swan was inspired by Perfect Blue. Kon noted in his blog that he had met with Aronofsky in 2001.

==== Costume design ====
Amy Westcott is credited as the costume designer and received several award nominations. A publicized controversy arose regarding the question of who had designed 40 ballet costumes for Portman and the dancers. An article in the British newspaper The Independent suggested those costumes had actually been created by Rodarte's Kate and Laura Mulleavy. Westcott challenged that view and stated that in all only 7 costumes, among them the Black and White Swan, had been created in a collaboration between Rodarte, Westcott, and Aronofsky. Furthermore, the corps ballet's costumes were designed by Zack Brown (for the American Ballet Theatre), and slightly adapted by Westcott and her costume design department. Westcott said: "Controversy is too complimentary a word for two people using their considerable self-publicising resources to loudly complain about their credit once they realized how good the film is."

==== Controversy ====
ABT dancer Sarah Lane served as a "dance double" for Portman in the film. In a March 3 blog entry for Dance Magazine, editor-in-chief Wendy Perron asked: "Do people really believe that it takes only one year to make a ballerina? We know that Natalie Portman studied ballet as a kid and had a year of intensive training for the film, but that doesn't add up to being a ballerina. However, it seems that many people believe that Portman did her own dancing in Black Swan." This led to responses from Benjamin Millepied and Aronofsky, who both defended Portman, as well as a response from Lane claiming that she has not been given due credit.

=== Top ten lists ===
Black Swan was on many critics' top ten lists for 2010.

- 1st – Caryn James, IndieWire
- 1st – Drew McWeeny, HitFix
- 1st – Noel Murray, A.V. Club
- 1st – James Rocchi, MSN
- 2nd – Keith Phipps and Nathan Rabin, A.V. Club
- 2nd – Andrew O'Hehir, Salon.com
- 2nd – Claudia Puig, USA Today
- 2nd – Lou Lumenick, New York Post
- 3rd – Roger Ebert, Chicago Sun-Times
- 3rd – Rene Rodriguez, Miami Herald
- 3rd – Harry Knowles, Ain't It Cool News
- 4th – Tasha Robinson, A.V. Club
- 4th – Gregory Ellwood, HitFix
- 5th – James Berardinelli, Reelviews
- 5th – FX Feeney, Village Voice
- 5th – Christy Lemire, Associated Press
- 5th – Elizabeth Weitzman, New York Daily News
- 5th – Richard Brody, The New Yorker
- 6th – Mary Pols & Glenn Kenny, MSN
- 7th – Peter Travers, Rolling Stone
- 8th – Peter Knegt, Indiewire
- 8th – Mick LaSalle, San Francisco Chronicle
- 8th – Betsy Sharkey, Los Angeles Times
- 8th – Simon Abrams, Village Voice
- Top 10 (listed alphabetically) – Steven Rea, Philadelphia Inquirer
- Top 10 (listed alphabetically) – Pete Hammond, Boxoffice Magazine
- Top 10 (listed alphabetically) – Joe Williams, St. Louis Post-Dispatch

=== Accolades and awards ===
Black Swan appeared on many critics' top ten lists of 2010 and is frequently considered to be one of the best films of the year. It was featured on the American Film Institute's 10 Movies of the Year. On January 25, 2011, the film was nominated for five Academy Awards (Best Picture, Best Director, Best Actress, Best Cinematography and Best Film Editing), with Portman winning Best Actress. In 2025, it ranked number 81 on The New York Times' list of "The 100 Best Movies of the 21st Century" and number 74 on the "Readers' Choice" edition of the list.

== Stage adaptation ==
A musical adaptation of Black Swan premiered at the American Repertory Theater in Cambridge, Massachusetts on May 26, 2026. The production was directed and choreographed by Sonya Tayeh, with music and lyrics by Dave Malloy and a book by Jen Silverman.
