= Stills =

Stills may refer to:

== People with the surname ==
- Chris Stills (born 1974), American musician
- Dante Stills (born 1999), American football player
- Darius Stills (born 1998), American football player
- Gary Stills (born 1974), American football player
- Stephen Stills (born 1945), American guitarist and singer-songwriter

== Other uses ==
- Still, a device used for distillation
- Film still, a photograph used for the advertising of a film
- The Stills, a Canadian indie rock band
- Stills (Gauntlet Hair album) (2013)
- Stills (Stephen Stills album) (1975)
- Stills, an EP by God Help the Girl

== See also ==
- Still (disambiguation)
- Systemic-onset juvenile idiopathic arthritis, or Still's disease
  - Adult-onset Still's disease
