= Stieler =

People named Stieler:

- Joseph Karl Stieler (1781–1858), a German painter.
- Adolf Stieler (1775–1836), a German cartographer.
- Karl Stieler (1842–1885), a lawyer and author.

Other uses of the word:

- Stielers Handatlas, named after Adolf Stieler.

== See also ==
- Stiller (disambiguation)
