= Stille =

Stille may refer to:

== Geography ==
- Stille (river), a river near Schmalkalden, Thuringia, Germany
- Stille Musel, a river of Baden-Württemberg, Germany

== Science ==
- Stille reaction

== History ==
- Stille Omgang, a religious procession in the Netherlands
- Stille Hilfe, an aid organization for SS members after WWII

== Music ==
- "Die Stille" (the silence), song by Fanny Mendelssohn
- Stille (Lacrimosa album)
- Stille (Chima album)
- Stille (Saints & Lovers album)
- Stille, album by Åse Teigland on NorCD, see list of NorCD albums

== People with that surname ==
- Albert Stille (1814–93), Swedish ínstrument maker and entrepreneur
- Alfred Stillé (1813-1900), American physician
- Alexander Stille, American writer
- Arthur Stille (1863–1922), Swedish historian
- Arvid Stille (1888–1970), Swedish architect
- Ben Stille (born 1997), American football player
- Christoph Ludwig von Stille (1696–1752), Prussian general major
- Curt Stille (1873–1957), inventor of the Textophon
- Giles Stille (1958) English footballer in Sweden
- Gustav Stille (1845–1920), physician and writer
- Hans Stille (1876–1966), German geologist
- John Kenneth Stille (1930–1989), American chemist, originator of the Stille reaction
- Mary Ingram Stille (1854-1935), American historian, journalist, and temperance reformer
- Max Stille (1853–1906), Swedish ínstrument maker and entrepreneur
- Olof Persson Stille, American settler
- Renate Stille (1944), Brazilian diplomat
- Ugo Stille (1919–1995) Russian-born naturalized Italian writer
- Ulrich Stille (1910–1976), German physicist
- Ulrich Christoph von Stille (1654–1728), Prussian General lieutenant
