= Stifler =

Stifler is a surname. Notable people with the surname include:

- Donna Stifler (born 1965), American politician
- J. Royston Stifler (died 1921), American politician and lawyer
- Mary Cloyd Burnley Stifler (1876–1956), American botanist
- Steve Stifler, character from American Pie

== See also ==
- Stiller (surname)
