= STT =

STT may refer to:

== Organizations ==
- ST Telemedia, a portfolio company of Temasek Holdings
- Stabilimento Tecnico Triestino, a shipbuilding company in Italy
- State Street Corp. (NYSE symbol), a US financial services company
- STT Telkom, a telecommunication engineering school
- Suomen Tietotoimisto, a Finnish news agency
- Special Investigation Service, a Lithuanian anti-corruption agency

== Computing ==
- Speech to text, converting spoken audio into text
- Single transaction translator, a particular functional unit in USB hubs
- Spin torque transfer, a computer hardware technology

== Other uses ==
- Cyril E. King Airport (IATA and FAA LID), St. Thomas, U.S. Virgin Islands
- Soft tissue therapy, a physical treatment
- Spinothalamic tract, a sensory pathway from skin to thalamus
- Spread tow tape, in making spread tow fabric
- Stewarton railway station (station code), Scotland

== See also ==
- ST2 (disambiguation)
