= Stil =

Stil or variant, may refer to:

- Stil Island, Vlore County, Albania
- André Stil (1921-2004), French writer
- Didier Stil (born 1964), French bobsledder
- STIL, SCL-interrupting locus protein
- Stil FM 105.5, Călăraşi, Romania
- Radio Stil (Belarus) 101.2, Minsk, Belarus
- Stil, a hand in the Dutch card game Pandoer

== See also ==
- STII (disambiguation)
- Still (disambiguation)
