= ST11 =

ST11 or variation may refer to:

- Star Trek (film) (2009 film) 11th Star Trek theatrical film
- Stralpes Aéro ST-11, a sailplane
- General Aircraft Monospar ST-11, a model in the "Monospar" series of airplanes from General Aircraft

== See also ==
- 11th Street (disambiguation)
- STII (disambiguation)
