= Black Swan (musical) =

2026 musical

- Music: Dave Malloy
- Lyrics: Dave Malloy
- Book: Jen Silverman
- Basis: Film Black Swan by Andres Heinz
- Premiere: 26 May 2026: American Repertory Theater, Cambridge, Massachusetts
- Productions: 2026 Cambridge

Black Swan is a 2026 musical with music and lyrics by Dave Malloy and a book by Jen Silverman. Based on the 2010 film Black Swan, it follows Nina, a ballerina chosen for her first leading role in Swan Lake, and the pressure on her that follows. Development began in 2014. The creative team described their efforts to translate the film's exploration of power imbalances to a post–#MeToo movement context and in light of criticism of the film's handling of the topic, and the challenges of translating a psychological thriller to a stage production. The first production was in May 2026 at the American Repertory Theater in Cambridge, Massachusetts, directed by Sonya Tayeh. Critics praised its set design, lighting design, and choreography while noting problems with its book and score.

== Synopsis ==
=== Act I ===
Nina Sayers, a ballerina, dances alone on stage ("Prologue"). The rest of the ballet company enter and proceed to stretch and warm up ("Morning Class"). Director Jacques enters, delivering the news that the choreographer for the season's production of Swan Lake has unexpectedly pulled out; famous but controversial choreographer Margaux LeRoy has been tasked with putting together a new production in just three weeks. LeRoy announces her plan to audition the entire company for the lead role. This news upsets Beth, the current prima ballerina, but excites other members of the company, including Lily, the dancer considered the most likely candidate.

Nina returns home with this news to her mother Barbara, a former ballerina, who tells her this is her opportunity to be a star ("Star"). Nina practices in front of a mirror; the audience sees Nina's doppelganger in the mirror, following her movements but sometimes escaping from her ("The Mirror").

The next day, LeRoy auditions the company ("God and Beast"). The final two dancers under consideration are Nina and Lily ("Flow"). LeRoy tells the company the casting decision will be announced at that weekend's gala. At the gala, Barbara and LeRoy reminisce about their time as dancers and the company awaits the decision ("Gala Night"). Nina is chosen; Lily is chosen as the understudy. Beth laments not being chosen and looks back on her career ("Swan Song").

Back in the studio, the company begins rehearsing Swan Lake ("Swan Village"). LeRoy complements Nina's technique as the White Swan aspect of the role, but tells her that she is missing elements of the Black Swan aspect. Lily, who better captures these elements, demonstrates for Nina. Nina practices these techniques tirelessly through the weekend. Upon returning, LeRoy notices something has been awakened inside Nina.

After rehearsal that day, the company goes out to a club; Nina joins despite her usual reluctance. They drink and speculate about Beth, who has been absent since the gala ("Something Bad with Beth"). Nina takes drugs, sending her on a trip. She imagines meeting the sorcerer from Swan Lake ("Rothbart"), and a sexual encounter with Lily ("Roof's Edge").

=== Act II ===
Nina oversleeps the next day, she arrives at the theater to find the company running through a technical rehearsal with Lily ("The Trial"). In the dressing room afterwards, they comment on how Nina has grown distant ("Far from the Flock"). Nina confronts Lily about their encounter; Lily tells her that it did not happen. Nina believes the company is ostracizing her and calling her a fraud.

Returning home, Nina pulls a black feather from her back. Barbara tells Nina that, as her mother, she is the only one with Nina's best interests at heart ("Cygnet"). She clips Nina's nails, accidentally injuring her in the process. Nina snaps from the pressure, telling Barbara she feels suffocated and is moving out. Nina once again dances in front of the mirror, more consumed by the darkness inside her ("Scratch").

At the next rehearsal, Nina hears and sees things that are not there. As a result, she makes errors requiring the rehearsal to be stopped; Jacques and LeRoy send her home and replace her with Lily. Nina dances through the darkness following her dismissal ("Exile"). She visits Beth in the hospital for advice; Beth tells her there is no path back ("Nothing").

Nina has a nightmare featuring the dolls from The Nutcracker ("Nutcracker Nightmare"). At the premiere, she, her doppel, and Lily dance backstage; she breaks a mirror and stabs Lily with a shard of glass ("Shadow Dance"). She hears the places call for Act II of Swan Lake. The other members dance onstage as swans ("Village Dance"), then Nina enters and dances as the Black Swan ("Death Dance").

As the performance ends, LeRoy compliments Nina as Jacques and the company are bewildered. They realize Nina is bleeding and has stabbed herself as she pulls the shard of glass from her own abdomen. They raise her above their heads as Nina reveals a pair of black wings ("Finale").

== Cast and characters ==
Character	Cambridge
Character	2026
Nina	Melanie Moore
Doppel	Ida Saki
Lily	Jada Simone Clark
Beth	Tory Trowbridge
Barbara	Kate Jennings Grant
LeRoy	Amber Iman
Jacques	Thom Sesma

== Musical numbers ==
Act I

- "Prologue"
- "Morning Class"
- "Star"
- "The Mirror"
- "God and Beast"
- "Flow"
- "Gala Night"
- "Swan Song"
- "Swan Village"
- "Something Bad with Beth"
- "Rothbart"
- "Roof's Edge"

Act II

- "The Trial"
- "Far from the Flock"
- "Cygnet"
- "Scratch"
- "Exile"
- "Nothing"
- "Nutcracker Nightmare"
- "Shadow Dance"
- "Village Dance"
- "Death Dance"
- "Finale"

== Development ==
Black Swan is a musical theatre adaptation of the 2010 film Black Swan, originally written by Andres Heinz and directed by Darren Aronofsky, who was also a producer for the stage adaptation. Development began in 2014 by producers Kevin McCollum and Gail Berman, composer Dave Malloy and playwright Jen Silverman were later recruited. The Cambridge, Massachusetts-based American Repertory Theater became involved in 2024 and began holding workshops.

The original film drew criticism from some in the ballet community, who argued that it misportrayed the profession, relied on stereotypes, and was misogynistic. To address this, the stage production rewrote the originally male choreographer Thomas LeRoy as a woman, Margaux LeRoy, and focused on exploring different power imbalances than the film. Silverman described the original film as "teasing a cultural conversation yet to come". In light of the #MeToo movement, they rewrote the character to investigate a different set of cultural questions, commenting that it would be difficult to include the original character without making the story about #MeToo, a direction the production did not want to pursue. Compared to the film, the musical places a much larger emphasis on choreography, using dance as a storytelling medium, and developing relationships between the dancers.

The score features Malloy's reinterpretation of pieces by Tchaikovsky. Malloy described his score as "oboe, harp, and sampled swan sounds integrated into psycho-techno beats". The creative team sampled an orchestra playing Swan Lake's score, which they deconstructed, added effects to, and replayed alongside the pit orchestra.

Psychological thrillers are rare in stage productions, and the creative team cited their efforts to create the genre's characteristic tension within the structure of a musical and without the tools of film. The dance numbers begin as traditional ballet but gain more elements of contemporary dance as the show continues. Music supervisor Or Matias described the score as structurally different than most musicals, aiming to create a sense of foreboding rather than one of catharsis.

== Productions ==
Black Swan premiered at the American Repertory Theater in Cambridge, Massachusetts, with previews starting on 26 May 2026 and an official opening on 3 June. The limited run was originally scheduled through 28 June, and was extended through 12 July. Sonya Tayeh directed and choreographed the production.

== Reception ==
Writing for WBUR about the Cambridge production, Jacquinn Sinclair called Black Swan a "stunning portrayal of desire". They noted the dancing, calling it gorgeous, in particular the performance of Lily, and the show's creation of environments via set design and use of illusions and effects. Martin Copenhaver of The Arts Fuse similarly described Moore's performance specifically and the dance performance generally as the highlight of the show. Boston.com's Samantha Genzer praised the set design, lighting design, and choreography. She described Trowbridge as Beth as a standout performance and Moore as Nina as "undeniably impressive". Lynne Weiss of Cambridge Day described it as "thrilling in its bold use of lighting, choreography, sound, music and illusion".

Genzer called Black Swan "not a musical audience [sic] will leave humming", commenting that the songs were not the focus and generally not memorable, but attributed this to the production's goal of emphasizing dance. Copenhaver described the songs as "bland and unremarkable". In a negative review, Don Aucoin of the Boston Globe described the music as "not-terribly-memorable" and the lyrics as too superficial to provide depth. Aucoin also considered the musical's book to be thin and the characterizations to be one-note, resulting in a story that did not live up to the show's performances. Weiss similarly commented that the story was a weaker element of the production, describing it as confusing.

Critics noted the differences from the film. Several considered the recharacterization of LeRoy to be a positive, in light of the #MeToo movement in the intervening years. Writing for New York Stage Review, Bob Verini praised the decision to depict Nina's struggles through dance and described the refocusing on the personal stories of Nina and the company as "infinitely more relatable".
