= Gauntlet Hair =

American indie rock band

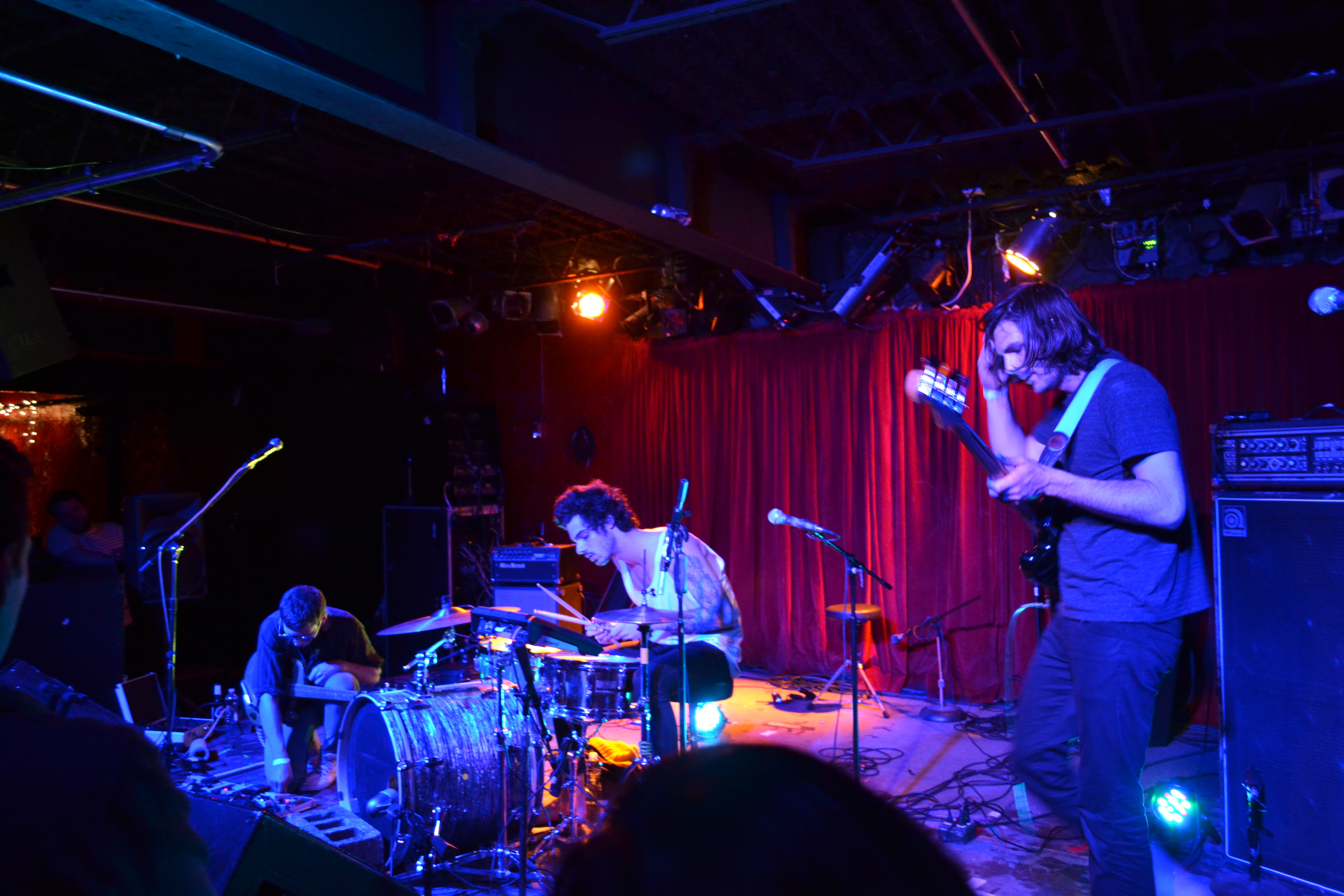
- Gauntlet Hair performing in 2012

Background information
- Origin: Denver, Colorado, United States
- Genres: Noise pop, experimental rock, shoegazing
- Years active: 2009–2013
- Label: Dead Oceans
- Past members: Andy Rauworth; Craig Nice
- Website: gauntlethair.net

Gauntlet Hair was an American indie rock band from Denver, Colorado, United States. The band consisted of Craig Nice and Andy Rauworth. After releasing two extended plays, they signed to record label Dead Oceans and released their self-titled debut album.

== Biography ==
Nice and Rauworth had been playing music together since their freshman year of high school. Previously located in Chicago, they moved to Lafayette to hone their sound, and subsequently relocated to Denver.

In 2011, Gauntlet Hair signed to independent record label Dead Oceans and began recording their debut album. Gauntlet Hair was released on October 18, 2011, and has met with mixed to positive reviews.

Gauntlet Hair released their song "My Christ" as a single on January 24, 2012. The music video for "Human Nature", directed by Ryan Ohm, was released as a preview of their sophomore album, Stills, which was released by Dead Oceans on July 16, 2013. "Human Nature" was also featured in an episode of Showtime's Shameless.

On August 12, 2013, the band announced via their Facebook page that they were splitting up, writing "Gauntlet Hair has reached its end. Thank you all for your support these past 4 years. Love, Andy & Craig".

On May 31, 2018, the band announced via their Facebook page that they have started a new project named Cindygod and that new music shall follow. They released their first EP Demos on December 18, 2018.

== Past members ==
- Andy Rauworth – vocals, guitar
- Craig Nice – drums, percussion

Touring members

- Matt Daniels – bass
- Nathan Wright – guitar
- Brian Brissart – guitar/keys

== Discography ==
- I Was Thinking... / Our Scenery (single, June 2010; Forest Family Records)
- Out, Don't... b/w Heave (EP, October 2010; Kemado Records d/b/a Mexican Summer)
- Gauntlet Hair (debut studio album, October 2011; Dead Oceans)
- Stills (studio album, July 2013; Dead Oceans)
