= ST =

ST, St, or St. most often refers to:

- -st, a suffix for an ordinal numeral, such as 1^{st} or 21^{st}
- Saint, abbreviated "St" in (British and Commonwealth usage) and "St." elsewhere
- Street, e.g. in addresses

ST, St, or St. may also refer to:

== Arts and entertainment ==
- Stanza, in poetry
- Suicidal Tendencies, an American heavy metal/hardcore punk band
- Star Trek, a science-fiction media franchise
- Summa Theologica, a 13th-century compendium of Catholic philosophy and theology by St. Thomas Aquinas
- "S.T. the Space Traveler", a 1990 episode (S8 E8 / #97) of 1983 TV series Alvin and the Chipmunks
- Stranger Things, a 2016–2025 Netflix sci-fi horror series
- Skibidi Toilet, a 2023–present YouTube animated web-series

== Geography ==
=== Generic terms ===
- State (polity)
- Strait
- Street, e.g. in addresses

=== Specific places ===
- São Tomé and Príncipe
- Saxony-Anhalt (ISO 3166 code DE-ST), a state of Germany
- ST postcode area, UK, centered around Stoke-on-Trent
- Split, Croatia and its surrounds, indicated with prefix ST on vehicle registration plates of Croatia
- Sudan (aircraft registration prefix ST; see aviation in Sudan)

== Language and typography ==
- Sesotho language (ISO 639-1 language code "st")
- ﬅ or ﬆ, typographic ligatures
- Standard Theory, in generative grammar

== Law ==
- Scheduled Tribes, in India
- ST, the court-ordered pseudonym used in the Sudiksha Thirumalesh case

== Science and technology ==
=== Electronics and computing ===
- ST connector, Straight Tip optical fiber connector
- Seagate Technology, an American data storage company, whose hard disk drives are named with the prefix "ST-"
- STMicroelectronics, a worldwide manufacturer of semiconductors
- Atari ST, a 1985 line of personal computers
- Internet Stream Protocol, an experimental Internet protocol
- Structured text, a high-level programming language that syntactically resembles Pascal and is designed for programmable logic controllers (PLC)
- .st, the Internet country code top-level domain (ccTLD) for São Tomé and Príncipe
- st, a simple terminal emulator, written by suckless

=== Mathematics ===
- Standard part function, a mapping from hyperreal to real numbers
- Such that (s.t.), a phrase preceding a condition predicate

=== Physics ===
- String theory, a model of subatomic structure
- Spherical tokamak or spherical torus (ST), a type of fusion power device
- Stanton number (St), relating to thermodynamics of fluid
- Strouhal number (St), describing oscillating flow mechanisms

=== Medicine ===
- ST segment, the part of an electrocardiogram connecting the QRS complex and the T wave
- Sulfotransferase, enzymes that catalyze the transfer of a sulfo group
- Heat-stable enterotoxin, secretory peptides produced by some bacterial strains, such as enterotoxigenic Escherichia coli

=== Units of measurement ===
- Stokes (unit) (St), a CGS unit of kinematic viscosity
- Stone (weight) (st.), a unit of mass used in the British Isles and other countries

=== Other uses in science and technology ===
- ST Engineering, a global technology, defense, and engineering group headquartered in Singapore
- ST, the ship prefix for a steam tug or steam trawler

== Transportation companies ==
- German airline Germania (airline) (IATA airline designator "ST")
- ST, the railroad reporting mark for American railroad Springfield Terminal Railway (Vermont)
- Sound Transit, a shortened form of Central Puget Sound Regional Transit Authority in the U.S. state of Washington
- State Transport, a shortened form of Maharashtra State Road Transport Corporation of India
- Suffolk Transit, a shortened form of Suffolk County Transit, the bus system serving Suffolk County, New York, U.S.
- Stouffville line (ST), of the GO Transit rail network in Ontario, Canada

== Other uses ==
- sine tempore, a Latin term used to indicate that a lecture will begin at the exact time; see academic quarter (class timing)
- Striker (association football), a position in association football
- Statstjänstemannaförbundet, or Swedish Union of Civil Servants, a trade union

== See also ==
- ΣΤ (disambiguation) (sigma tau)
- STST (disambiguation)
- STFC (disambiguation) for uses of ST F.C.
