= STFC (disambiguation) =

STFC can stand for:

- Science and Technology Facilities Council, a UK research council
- Star Trek: First Contact, a 1996 film
- Star Trek Fleet Command, a 2018 video game

STFC also stands for the names of many football clubs, most notably the professional clubs

- Swindon Town F.C.
- Shrewsbury Town F.C.

It may also refer to one of the following other clubs:

In China:

- Shandong Taishan F.C.

In England:

- Sandhurst Town F.C.
- Sandiacre Town F.C.
- Sawbridgeworth Town F.C.
- Seaford Town F.C.
- Selby Town F.C.
- Sevenoaks Town F.C.
- Shefford Town F.C.
- Sherborne Town F.C.
- Shifnal Town F.C.
- Shirebrook Town F.C.
- Sleaford Town F.C.
- Slough Town F.C.
- Somersham Town F.C.
- Spennymoor Town F.C.
- Stafford Town F.C.
- Staines Town F.C.
- Steyning Town F.C.
- Stockport Town F.C.
- Stonehouse Town F.C.
- Stowmarket Town F.C.
- Stratford Town F.C.
- Swaffham Town F.C.

In Scotland:

- Scone Thistle F.C.
- Steins Thistle F.C.
- Strathspey Thistle F.C.

== See also ==
- ST (disambiguation)
