= STII =

STII may refer to:

- Straits Times Industrial Index (STII), a former Singapore stock index, replaced by the Straits Times Index
- Science and Technology Information Institute (STII), a Philippine government institute, part of the government Department of Science and Technology

== See also ==
- ST2 (disambiguation)
- ST11 (disambiguation)
- Stil (disambiguation)
