= STST =

STST may refer to:

== Groups, companies, organizations ==
- Argon ST (NASDAQ stock ticker: STST), a subsidiary of Boeing
- Strassenbahn Stansstad-Stans (StSt), a defunct rail company, see List of railway companies in Switzerland
- STST Productions, founded by Scott Trimble; a location management company

== Arts, entertainment, media ==
- Scott Trimble (born 1977), a.k.a. "STST", from full name Scott Thomas Suggs Trimble; a U.S. location scout
- Sounding the Seventh Trumpet, the first studio album by Avenged Sevenfold.
- Star Trek: Short Treks (ST:ST), an anthology TV series

== Other uses ==
- Single-trunk Steiner tree (STST), a design and topology, see Rectilinear Steiner tree
- Store Status (STST), a command code for the TI-990
- Subjective total sleep time, a measure of sleep quality

== See also ==
- ST (disambiguation)
- ST2 (disambiguation)
