= Saints and Lovers =

American rock band

- Origin: New York City, United States
- Genres: Rock
- Years active: 2004–present
- Labels: Independent (current); Stolen Transmission
- Members: Dennis Cahlo; Scott Meola; Doug Meola; Gina Lee
- Website: http://www.kekal.org

Saints and Lovers is a three-piece American rock band from New York City. The band started as a duo consisting of Dennis Cahlo, formerly of The Realistics, and the American band V's guitarist Scott Meola. After a residency at Pianos in New York, drummer Doug Meola joined the band before its debut at Mercury Lounge. Originally called The Sons of Sound, the band changed its name to Saints and Lovers in October, 2004.

== History ==
Saints and Lovers released two EPs in 2004, and third in 2005 on Sarah Lewitinn's Stolen Transmission label. The Atmosphere EP included a cover of Joy Division's "Atmosphere."

In 2006, Saints and Lovers began recording Stille, the band's first full-length album. Recorded, mixed, and produced entirely by the band, the album marks the maturation of Saints and Lovers’ songwriting ability and sonic scope. Stille was released on February 5, 2008.

With the addition of live keyboardist Gina Lee, formerly of Unisex Salon, Saints and Lovers continue to perform and open for such acts as The Raveonettes, The Bravery, Clap Your Hands Say Yeah, The Dears, and Morningwood.
