= Alfred Still =

English electrical engineer

Alfred Still (January 28, 1869 – May 3, 1963) was an English electrical engineer, academic and book author. He worked both as a practicing electrical engineer and as faculty at Purdue University. Before retirement he authored six textbooks; after retiring he co-authored one textbook, wrote three general science books and one on aspects of scientific philosophy, some of which are available online.

== Life ==
Still was born in Gloucestershire, England, and received his primary education in Dieppe, Normandy, France from 1879-1885. At the age of 16 he entered Finsbury Technical College in London, England, graduating in 1889 where he studied under Dr. Silvanus P. Thompson. After graduating, he participated in the development of the first hydroelectric power plant in England, and later became a designer and manufacturer of electrical machinery in Manchester, England.

In early 1911 Still moved to Canada to work on hydroelectric development for the Lake Superior Power Company, with its central office in Sault Ste. Marie, Ontario. He joined the Purdue University faculty in 1913 to take charge of instruction in Electrical Engineering, teaching for many years. He retired as Professor Emeritus in 1935. He was the author of a number of science textbooks, (Note: Many of the books were reprinted, sometimes by different publishers with slight variations in the title. A few are available online, but some are rare books. Some have also been translated into other languages.) scientific articles and at least one novel.

== Awards ==
Still became a Fellow of the American Institute of Electrical Engineers in 1914.

== Bibliography ==
- Still, Alfred (1898). Alternating Currents of Electricity and the Theory of Transformers. Whittaker. ISBN 9780469790599.
- Still, Alfred (1914). Polyphase Currents. McGraw-Hill. ISBN 9780548585467.
- Still, Alfred (1916). Principles of electrical design; d. c. and a. c. generators. McGraw-Hill.
- Still, Alfred (1919). Principle of Transformer Design. McGraw-Hill. ISBN 9781164884163.
- Still, Alfred (1924). Elements of electrical design. McGraw-Hill.
- Still, Alfred (1931). Overhead electric power transmission: principles and calculations. McGraw-Hill. ISBN 9781163952375.
- Still, Alfred (1944). Soul of Amber: The Background of Electrical Science. New York: Murray Hill Books.
- Still, Alfred (1946). Soul of Lodestone: The Background of Magnetic Science. New York: Murray Hill.
- Still, Alfred (1946). Communication through the ages: from sign language to television. New York: Murray Hill.
- Still, Alfred (1950). Borderlands of Science. Rider. ISBN 9780802216489.
- Still, Alfred; Siskind, Charles (1954). Elements of Electrical Machine Design. McGraw-Hill.
