= Still (play) =

2013 American play by Jen Silverman

Still is a play written by Jen Silverman centered around the topic of stillbirth. It was staged at the Lincoln Center and won the 2013 Yale Drama Series competition, for which Silverman received the David Charles Horn Prize and a cash award of $10,000.

== Characters ==
- Constantinople: Described as a "giant newborn baby", Constantine is dead. The playwright notes he should be played by an adult male appear to be "slippery, as unclothed as possible, unearthly, disturbing, and charming".
- Morgan: Constantine's mother. She is described as being "41, fierce, grieving, all angles".
- Dolores: 18 years old, Dolores is described as being "at odds with the world, from time to time a dominatrix".
- Elena: A midwife, Elena is to be around 30 years old, and is described as being "strongly principled, scared".

== Setting ==
The play alternates between two settings. Scenes take place either in a hotel or in Morgan's basement.

== Plot ==
=== Scene One ===
The play opens with Constantine alone on stage. He speaks to the audience and admits to being two days old as well as being dead. He quickly leaves the stage when he hears his mother's cries. He leaves saying that he doesn't have much time, as his body continues to grow stiff.

=== Scene Two ===
Taking place in a hotel, Dolores is shooting pool. She is dressed in dominatrix gear. As she plays, a woman enters with a carnival mask on, hiding her face. She apologizes for being late, and Dolores is quick to establish the rules of how their exchange will go. After demanding payment first, money is exchanged and the woman begins to lament on how she feels she is a failure and sought out Dolores business in hopes for redemption of some sort. It is at this point that Dolores vomits. Despite the woman's concern, Dolores claims it is food poisoning and demands the woman to take off the mask. It is revealed to be Elena. Kicking her out, Dolores suggests they reschedule. Elena exits and Dolores is left alone on stage.

=== Scene Three ===
Constantine enters the stage and remarks of the new things he has been learning. He speaks of experiencing rain for the first time and how he has learned new words such as "hardcore". He mentions his mother hasn't cried that day, but when she does, he tries to find her despite his bones getting stiffer. He leaves once he hears her cries.

=== Scene Four ===
Taking place in Morgan's basement, Morgan speaks with Elena. Morgan describes the pain she is feeling since her still birth. Elena listens and comments on the casseroles people have brought over to her. They discuss if there is fault to be found in his death, and Morgan decides she wants to see Constantine, as she regrets her choice to not hold his body in the hospital.

=== Scene Five ===
The scene opens with Dolores laying on the pool table in the hotel, telling dead baby jokes to her stomach. She speaks to her body, saying she is not "going to keep you". Constantine enters. He explains to Dolores how he is both two days old and dead. The two converse and Dolores asks what it's like to be dead. Constantine talks about wanting to see his mother and learns a new curse word. Dolores allows him to go up to her room with her.

=== Scene Six ===
Elena is on the phone with the hospital where Constantine's body was taken. There is an issue with locating him, and Morgan demands they find her son. When they hang up the phone, Elena admits that Morgan will soon be hearing from The Board of Nursing. Aiming to prove that children must be delivered in a hospital to avoid any situations like that of Morgan and Constantine's, Elena remarks that they will likely try to take her medical license away. She continues to say how Constantine's death affects her every day. Elena leaves at Morgan's request, but not before she gives Morgan a pumpkin. Morgan remarks how it is dead, but she will love it anyway.

=== Scene Seven ===
Dolores and Constantine are in her hotel room. She paints his nails and they discuss how Dolores got pregnant. Dolores notices the hospital bracelet on Constantine's foot and remarks how it says his mother's name is Morgan. Constantine mentions he never knew her name, as he cannot read. He tells Dolores he wants to see her, but she responds that it might be too much of a shot to see him so suddenly. They decide on writing a letter instead, and Morgan writes down a simple message saying that Constantinople would like to see Morgan. Constantinople signs it to the best of his ability and wishes for Dolores to no longer be sad. She admits that with him around, she feels less lonely. She leaves to deliver the letter, and as he is alone on stage, Constantinople recognizes that he is angry for the first time.

=== Scene Eight ===
Morgan and Dolores are sitting in Morgan's basement. Morgan inquires if Dolores is truly there under the pretenses she claims (being a part of a church group). Eventually, Dolores admits that she knows about Morgan's situation and gives her condolences as well as hints at knowing Constantinople without giving too much away. Morgan responds that Dolores looks pregnant, remarking how she can sense it. Dolores tells her of her intentions to not keep the child and the two discuss abortion and life in general. Dolores admits she tried to kill herself in the past and Morgan states if she was Dolores' mother, she would feel terrible for not giving her the life she deserved. Dolores leaves via window without giving Morgan the letter from Constantinople.

=== Scene Nine ===
Elena returns to the hotel to find Constantinople. The two interact with one another without knowing how they're connected. Elena, believing Constantinople works with Dolores, has him read off insults to her. As he does, she breaks down and he tries to comfort her. Elena mentions he seems familiar and before she can find out his identity, Dolores comes back and promptly kicks her out again. Elena leaves and Constantinople inquires about the letter. Dolores claims she couldn't find Morgan because she had left town. At this, Constantinople begins to cry out of fear of becoming too stiff and decomposed by the time Morgan returns. In response, Dolores tells him to write another letter and she will make sure it gets to Morgan this time.

=== Scene Ten ===
Dolores returns to Morgans house and the two sit down and talk again. The conversation turns to the topic of Dolores getting an abortion and while initially defensive against Morgan, Dolores becomes touched by her advice and opinions. Stating that she does not have the right to govern Dolores' actions, Morgan also notes that she believes Dolores doesn't truly want to get rid of her baby. In return, Dolores asks about Constantinople and what Morgan was feeling. Morgan admits it is nice to talk about him and the two share an intimate embrace.

=== Scene Eleven ===
Elena is in the hotel once again and Constantinople (in dominatrix clothing) finds her. She is cradling another pumpkin underneath the pool table. Joining her, Constantinople learns she has lost her nursing license. The two share their fears and Elena admits Constantinople may be right when he said she might need to find a new purpose in life. As he recounts that he is getting more and more stiff, he hears Morgan's heartbeat and runs off stage to find her. Elena calls after him, but seeing the dominatrix gear he has left behind, thanks him, instead.

=== Scene Twelve ===
Dolores and Morgan are still in the basement, and Constantinople appears at the window. As he is let in, it becomes apparent that neither Morgan or Constantinople can hear the other. Dolores explains that he is her son and that he wishes to see her. She apologizes for not telling her about him sooner, and leaves. Both Constantinople and Morgan speak to the other even though it is not being heard. Constantinople admits he wish he could stay and how he is confused, but he admits he knows Morgan loves him. Morgan recounts what it was like being pregnant with him and what her life will be like without him.

=== Scene Thirteen ===
Elena is in dominatrix gear and speaking to various pumpkins set on top of the pool table in the hotel. As Dolores comes back in, Elena allows her counsel as Dolores seems upset. As they speak, Dolores admits she has messed up in the past, but that those things shape who she is today. As Dolores leaves to write another letter, Elena muses how her new shape isn't that of a dominatrix, and leaves the hotel.

=== Scene Fourteen ===
Constantinople, Morgan, and Dolores are all on stage, facing the audience. They each speak as though writing a letter and at times, speak at the same time. Constantinople speaks to his mother, Morgan to Constantinople, and Dolores to the child inside her. Dolores speaks of how she will be waiting and ready for when the child arrives. Constantinople admits he will miss Morgan, and he thanks her before fading off stage. Morgan is left alone on stage. She speaks of what her loss feels like and what she will deal with in the rest of her life. She speaks of her hopes of sharing Constantinople with more children and how she will never stop missing and loving him. Lights fade on Morgan and the play ends.

== Playwright notes ==
Silverman notes that the play should not contain an intermission. They also explicitly notes that actors should refrain from crying unless specifically stated, and that all crying must be understated and subtle. Silverman remarks that actors should find humor in the dark moments of the play as well as the moments of joy.

== Bibliography ==
- Silverman, Jen. Yale Drama Series : Still. New Haven, CT, USA: Yale University Press, 2014. ProQuest ebrary. Web. 8 May 2016.
