= Stille Musel =

River in Germany

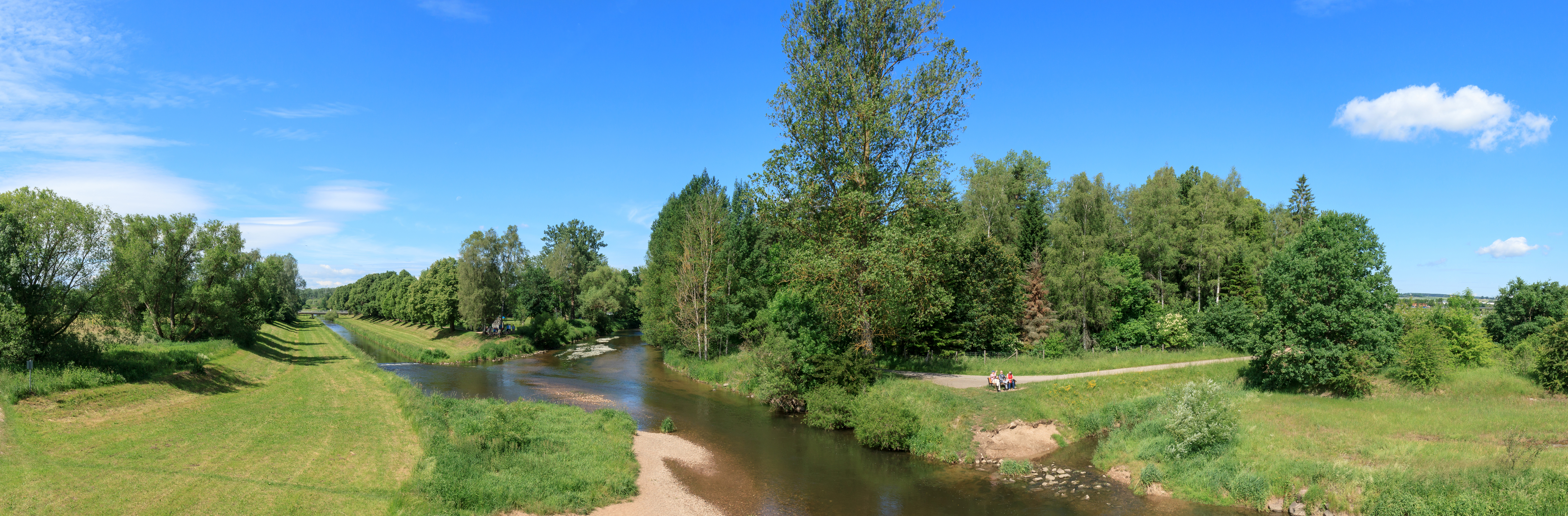

Location
- Country: Germany
- State: Baden-Württemberg

Physical characteristics
- Mouth
  - location: Danube
  - coordinates: 47.9514°N 8.5210°E
- Length: 14.0 km (8.7 mi)

Basin features
- Progression: Danube→ Black Sea

The Stille Musel, often just called the Musel by locals, is a small river about 14 km long, which has its source between Mühlhausen near Schwenningen and Hochemmingen at the Türnhalde near the B 523, flows through the Wittmannstal and flows into the Salinensee at Bad Dürrheim. It leaves the Salinensee again, flows through the centre of Bad Dürrheim and further to Donaueschingen, there north of the Schlosspark, where it flows into the Danube from the left shortly after the confluence of Brigach and Breg.

== See also ==
- List of rivers of Baden-Württemberg
