= Stills (Gauntlet Hair album) =

Studio album by Gauntlet Hair
- Released: July 16, 2013
- Genres: Indie rock, noise rock, neo-psychedelia, shoegazing, experimental rock
- Length: 30:56
- Label: Dead Oceans
- Producer: Jacob Portrait

Gauntlet Hair chronology
Gauntlet Hair (2011)	Stills (2013)

Professional ratings
Aggregate scores
Source	Rating
Metacritic	61/100
Review scores
Source	Rating
Allmusic	3.5/5 stars

Stills is the second and final studio album by American band Gauntlet Hair. It was released in July 2013 under Dead Oceans.

== Track listing ==
No.	Title	Length
1.	"Human Nature"	3:43
2.	"Spew"	2:36
3.	"Simple"	2:50
4.	"Bad Apple"	4:15
5.	"New To It"	2:42
6.	"Obey Me"	1:40
7.	"Heave"	3:10
8.	"G.I.D."	4:00
9.	"Falling Out"	2:50
10.	"Waste Your Art"	3:09
