= ST2 cardiac biomarker =

Member of the interleukin 1 receptor family

interleukin 1 receptor-like 1

Identifiers
- Symbol: IL1RL1
- NCBI gene: 9173
- HGNC: 5998
- OMIM: 601203
- RefSeq: NM_016232
- UniProt: Q01638

Other data
- Locus: Chr. 2 q12
Search for
- Structures: Swiss-model
- Domains: InterPro

The ST2 cardiac biomarker (also known as soluble interleukin 1 receptor-like 1) is a protein biomarker of cardiac stress encoded by the IL1RL1 gene. ST2 signals the presence and severity of adverse cardiac remodeling and tissue fibrosis, which occurs in response to myocardial infarction, acute coronary syndrome, or worsening heart failure.

ST2 provides prognostic information that is independent of other cardiac biomarkers such as BNP, NT-proBNP, highly sensitive troponin, GDF-15, and galectin-3. One study indicated that discrimination is independent of age, body mass index, history of heart failure, anemia and impaired kidney function or sex.

== Protein ==
ST2 is a member of the interleukin 1 receptor family. The ST2 protein has two isoforms and is directly implicated in the progression of cardiac disease: a soluble form (referred to as soluble ST2 or sST2) and a membrane-bound receptor form (referred to as the ST2 receptor or ST2L). When the myocardium is stretched, the ST2 gene is upregulated, increasing the concentration of circulating soluble ST2. The ligand for ST2 is the cytokine interleukin-33 (IL-33). Binding of IL-33 to the ST2 receptor, in response to cardiac disease or injury, such as an ischemic event, elicits a cardioprotective effect resulting in preserved cardiac function. This cardioprotective IL-33 signal is counterbalanced by the level of soluble ST2, which binds IL-33 and makes it unavailable to the ST2 receptor for cardioprotective signaling. As a result, the heart is subjected to greater stress in the presence of high levels of soluble ST2.

== Correlation with mortality ==
Published and peer-reviewed findings indicate that ST2 is a predictor of mortality at presentation. Studies have shown patients with ST2 levels above a clinical threshold consistently have a much higher risk of mortality while, equally important, patients with ST2 levels below threshold have a very low risk of mortality. Although it has been shown that ST2 concentrations correlate with heart failure severity there is no level that perfectly separates patients with and without heart failure for disease diagnosis. However, as a prognostic marker it has been clearly shown that patients are at a higher risk of adverse outcomes when ST2 levels are above a cutoff value of 35 ng/mL.

== Patients with ACS ==
ST2 is a strong predictor of cardiovascular death and risk of developing new heart failure in ST Elevation Myocardial Infarction (STEMI) & NSTE-ACS patients. In patients presenting with Acute Coronary Syndrome (ACS), those in the highest quartile (above 35 ng/ml) have more than 3 times higher risk of cardiovascular death and new heart failure at 30 days, than those in the lower quartiles. At one year, there is a relative risk of 2.3 for adverse outcomes.

ST2 is an active participant in the cardiac remodeling pathway and could identify which patients will respond to Eplerenone, or other therapies that reverse myocardial fibrosis.

== Clinical utility ==
- ST2 has considerable prognostic value and is used as an aid for risk stratification in identifying patients who are at high risk of mortality and rehospitalization in patients diagnosed with heart failure.
- ST2 is independent of natriuretic peptides, such as natriuretic peptide BNP and NT-proBNP, and therefore provide unique and complementary prognostic information.
- ST2 is also not adversely influenced by age, impaired renal function or elevated body mass index (BMI), common confounding situations for natriuretic peptide measurements.
- Repeated measurements of ST2 may aid in clinical decision-making.

== The ST2 test ==
ST2 is measured by an immunoassay, commercially marketed as the Presage ST2 Assay by Critical Diagnostics of San Diego, California. The assay has Food and Drug Administration approval and a CE Mark.
