= Stiller =

Stiller may refer to:

- Stiller (surname), includes a list of people with the surname Stiller
- Stiller, original name of rock band Sportfreunde Stiller
- Stiller, German name of novel I'm Not Stiller
