= Jen Silverman =

American dramatist

- Education: Brown University (BA); University of Iowa (MFA); Juilliard School (GrDip)
- Occupations: Playwright, TV writer, poet, novelist

Jen Silverman is an American playwright, TV writer, poet, and novelist.

Silverman's work frequently explores legacies of power and violence, how individuals navigate complex dynamics and social contracts in community, and how people seek to transform by rewriting their personal, familial, or political histories. Their works often differ in genres and styles, with some plays operating within the rules of absurdism and others working inside realism. As a queer person themself, Silverman frequently writes about sexuality and gender expression in their works. They have spoken about creating characters, many of whom are queer and female, but whose queerness or gender are not the solely representational aspects.

Silverman has many accolades from their published works including: Yale Drama Series Award, Lilly Award, the Helen Merrill Fund Award in 2015, the PoNY Fellowship (2016-2017), New York Foundation for the Arts fellowship, the Lower Manhattan Cultural Council fellowship, the Guggenheim, and Silverman is a Scholar of Note at The American Library in Paris.

== Early life and education ==
Jen Silverman grew up living and traveling in Scandinavia, Asia, and Europe as well as the United States. They were born in the US, but moved to Japan at a very young age. In their first 13 years of life they lived in a number of countries, among them the US, France, Japan, Finland, Sweden, Italy, New Zealand, and Canada. They attribute some of their work's themes to their experiences frequently being an outsider to a place or culture, and navigating questions of cultural rules and expectations in each new place.

Silverman completed a BA in comparative literature at Brown University, an MFA in playwriting at the University of Iowa, and an Artist Diploma at Juilliard working under Marsha Norman and Chris Durang.

== Career ==
Silverman has written a number of plays and has written for TV and film, including Netflix's Tales of the City. They are a writer-producer on Tokyo Vice, and Crystal Lake. Silverman has published essays on the relationship between art and morality in The New York Times and Vogue. Silverman made their Broadway debut as a playwright in the fall of 2024 with their play The Roommate at the Booth Theatre, starring Mia Farrow and Patti Lupone.. They are the book-writer on the musical Black Swan, an adaptation of the Darren Aronofsky movie, that had its premiere at American Repertory Theatre in the summer of 2026.

Silverman has also authored multiple books. They have written The Island Dwellers, an interlinked story collection published by Random House, and the novels We Play Ourselves and There's Going to Be Trouble.

They have taught theatre and playwriting classes at the University of Iowa, Playwrights Horizons Theater School at New York University, and ESPA (at Primary Stages). Silverman completed residencies at MacDowell Colony (three-time fellow), New Harmony, Hedgebrook, the Millay Colony for the Arts, and SPACE on Ryder Farm.

In 2016 they were awarded the Playwrights of New York Fellowship, an award that gives $100,000 of support to the recipient and covers housing expenses for a year. This allowed Silverman to quit their day job teaching and focus on writing full-time.

== Personal life ==
Silverman has personally identified themself as genderqueer and uses they/them pronouns.

== Works ==
=== Full-length plays ===
- Phoebe In Winter (2013) (Note: Ran from June 7–16, 2013 at The Wild Project under the direction of Mike Donahue and produced by Clubbed Thumb. Ran from September 22 – October 21, 2018 at Facility Theatre under the direction of Dado.)
- Still (2013) (Note: Ran at Lincoln Center in 2013 under the direction of Kate Whoriskey. Received the 2013 Yale Drama Series Award.)
- Pirates of the Cafeteria (2014)
- The Roommate (2015) (Note: Ran from March 6 – April 12, 2015 at Actors Theatre of Louisville under the direction of Mike Donahue. Ran from September 12 – December 15, 2024 at The Booth Theatre under the direction of Jack O’Brien.)
- The Moors (2016) (Note: Ran from January 29 – February 20, 2016 at Yale Repertory Theatre under the direction of Jackson Gay. Ran from February 27 – March 25, 2017 at Playwrights Realm under the direction of Mike Donahue.)
- Collective Rage: A Play In 5 Betties; In Essence, A Queer And Occasionally Hazardous Exploration; Do You Remember When You Were In Middle School And You Read About Shackleton And How He Explored The Antarctic?; Imagine The Antarctic As A Pussy And It’s Sort Of Like That (2016) (Note: Ran from September 12 – October 9, 2016 under the title Collective Rage: A Play In 5 Boops at Woolly Mammoth Theatre Company under the direction of Mike Donahue. Ran from August 16 – October 9, 2018 at Lucille Lortel Theatre under the direction of Mike Donahue.)
- Witch (2018) (Note: Ran from September 26 - December 16, 2018 at the Gillian Theatre under the direction of Marti Lyons.)
- Wink (2019) (Note: Ran from June 13 – July 7, 2019 at Marin Theatre Company under the direction of Mike Donahue.)
- Spain (2023) (Note: Ran from November 8 – December 17, 2023 at Second Stage Theatre under the direction of Tyne Rafaeli.)
- Highway Patrol (2024) (Note: Ran from January 20 – February 18, 2024 at Goodman Theatre under the direction of Mike Donahue.)

=== Short plays ===
- The Astonishing and Dangerous History of Mazefield the Frog (2015) (Note: Presented as a part of Keen Teens 2015. Part of the collection Keen Teens: Volume 3.)
- Hippos of the Eastern Enclosure(2017) (Note: Ran in the spring of 2017 at the 2017 Winterworks Festival under the direction of Christina Roussos.)
- The Visitations (2020) (Note: Premiered in August 2020 at Weston’s One Room Festival under the direction of Mike Donahue.)
- Real American Dinner Party (2020) (Note: Premiered in 2020 as an audio play by Playing On Air under the direction of Rachel Chavkin.)
- Ubu Anew (A Play for Strange People) (2021) (Note: A shortened and extremely loose adaptation of Alfred Jarry's play Ubu Roi.)
- Your Mother in the Night Sky (2021) (Note: Written as an audio play and performed as part of the Plays On Call Festival in March 2021 under the direction of Michael Legg.)

=== Musicals ===
- Black Swan (2026)

=== Books ===
- The Island Dwellers: Stories (2018)
- We Play Ourselves: A Novel (2021)
- Bath: A Poetry Chapboook (2021)
- There's Going to Be Trouble: A Novel (2024)

== Awards ==
Silverman has received the Yale Drama Series Award, Lilly Award, the Helen Merrill Fund Award in 2015, the PoNY Fellowship (2016-2017), and has received the MacDowell Fellowship three times. Recent honors include fellowships from the New York Foundation for the Arts, the Lower Manhattan Cultural Council, the National Endowment for the Arts and the Guggenheim. The American Library in Paris welcomed Jen Silverman for a virtual discussion of their novel, There's Going to be Trouble, in June of 2024 as a Scholar of Note.

The OSCAR® qualifying short film Troy, which they wrote, screened at 70 festivals internationally, including Cannes and Sundance (where it was nominated for Best Short Film). It won Best Comedy at the Aspen Shortsfest, and Best Narrative Short at the L.A. Outfest and is featured online in The New Yorker’s Screening Room.
