= Stiller (surname) =

Stiller is a surname. Notable people with the surname include:

- Angelo Stiller (born 2001), German footballer
- Ben Stiller (born 1965), American actor, son of Jerry Stiller
- Bonner L. Stiller (born 1956), American politician and attorney
- Brian Stiller (born 1942), Canadian evangelical Protestant
- Cheynee Stiller, Australian rules footballer
- Eric Stiller, American author and kayaker
- Jerry Stiller (1927–2020), American comedian and actor, father of Ben Stiller
- Mauritz Stiller (1883–1928), Finnish film director and actor
- Robert Stiller (1928–2016), Polish polyglot and translator
- Hannes Stiller (born 1978), Swedish footballer

== See also ==
- Stiler, surname
