= Susan Still (women's rights activist) =

American women's rights activist

Susan Still (born 1964 in New York) is an American women's rights activist and keynote speaker on domestic violence. After suffering years of extreme abuse from her husband, blues guitarist Ulner Lee Still, she was awarded custody of her sons, and her husband was jailed for 36 years, the longest sentence ever imposed for non-lethal violence.

== Life and domestic abuse ==
Susan Still was born in 1964 in a New York middle-class family. She attended college in Buffalo, New York where she met blues guitarist Ulner Lee Still and fell in love. They married a few years later while Susan supported the family financially by working at a health insurance company. At first, Ulner was controlling but not particularly violent or abusive. According to Susan, he had a will to dominate and the power to brainwash. Her husband eventually isolated Susan from her family and friends. However, due to her husband's proficiency at manipulation and control, and its gradual increase, Susan was slow to realize the high level of danger in which her husband's domineering behaviors placed her. After giving birth to their oldest children, a boy and a girl, Susan had to quit work and stay home to take care of them. After Susan and Ulner got married, he became emotionally and verbally abusive for 12 years and in 2001, Ulner also became physically abusive after she forgot an item he wanted when she was grocery shopping.

In 2002, the family's financial situation continued to worsen as they had another child and their careers became less stable. Susan began working again to singlehandedly support the family while Ulner became increasingly abusive. He was also jealous of men at her workplace. The long-term marriage became shaky and Ulner began to threaten Susan more frequently. Ulner instructed his sons and daughter to call their mother "white slut" (though she is in fact biracial) and on one occasion ordered his son to tape him beating her. He would later play the audio tapes to the family during dinner, occasionally pausing, pointing out Susan's flaws, mocking her while justifying his brutal behavior. Employer Lynn Jasper soon noticed bruises on Susan's face that she disguised as accidental injuries. Finally in May 2003, Jasper encouraged Susan to escape the household with her two sons after discovering a farewell letter at her office drawer containing words like "If anything should happen to me or if I should turn up missing, it is possible my husband was involved".

== Escape and court case ==
Susan and her two sons sought protection from the police in May 2003 and reported her husband for domestic abuse. Lisa Bloch Rodwin, assistant district attorney for Erie County, N.Y. gathered evidence and prosecuted the case. Susan took custody of her two sons, then 13 and 8. However, her daughter (21 years old at the time) chose to take the side of the father and testify on his behalf.

== Aftermath ==
In December 2004, New York State Supreme Court Justice John F. O'Donnell handed Ulner Still a 36-year prison sentence. The grounds were assault, in the second degree (six counts), assault in the third degree (six counts), and endangering the welfare of a child (two counts), making it the longest sentence given to the crime of domestic violence that didn't result in the death of the victim. On May 7, 2007, Susan Still appeared on The Oprah Winfrey Show to bring awareness to domestic violence against women. The show aired home videos recorded by the Stills' 13-year-old son of a 51-minute-long beating of Susan by her husband. Still has gained recognition among groups that campaign against violence against women, served as keynote speaker in Houston for the National College of District Attorneys and shared her story with Diane Sawyer on "20/20" in October 2006.
