= Interleukin 33 receptor =

Protein found in humans

IL33R
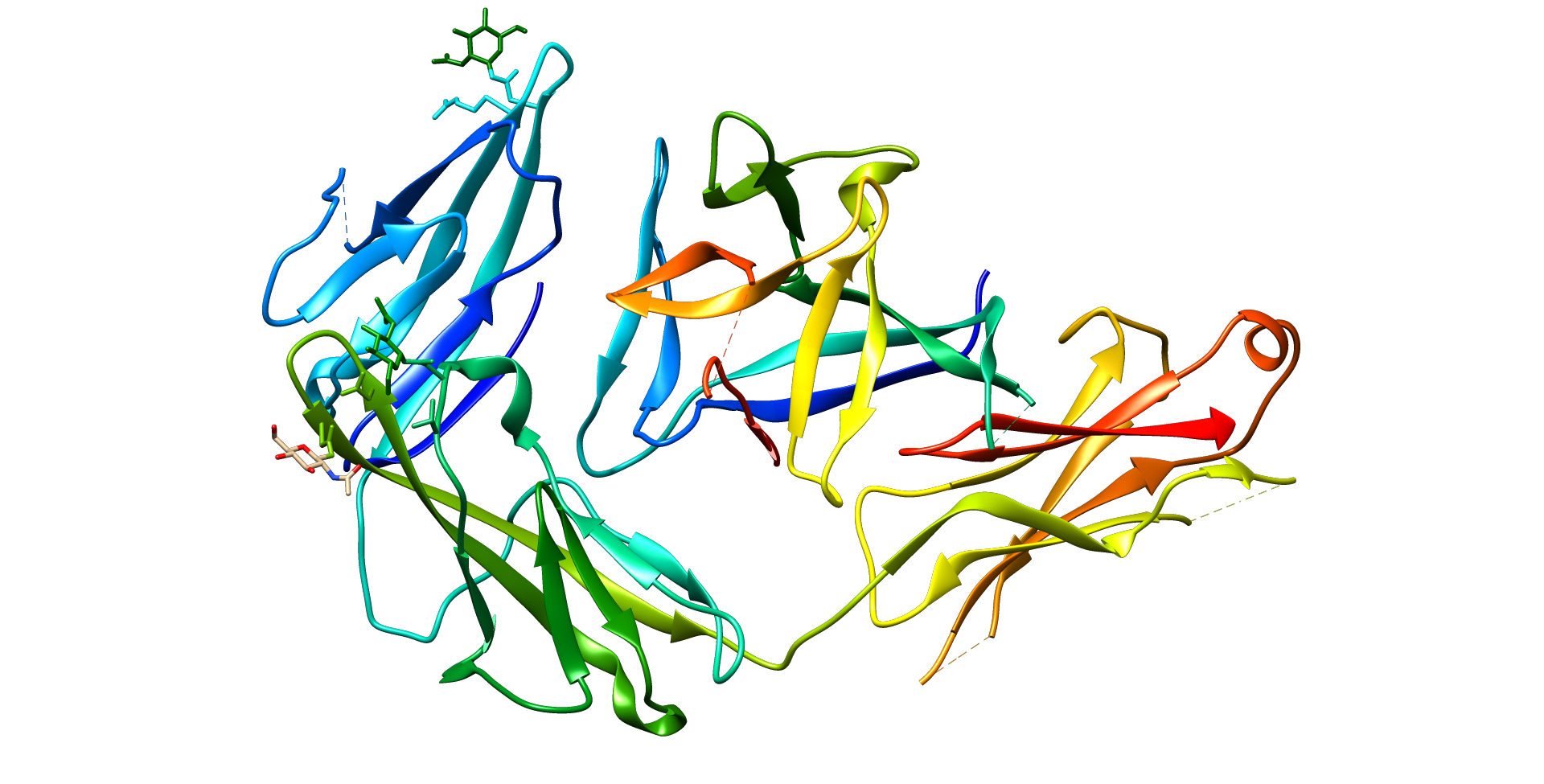

Identifiers
- Aliases: IL33R, DER4, FIT-1, ST2, ST2L, ST2V, T1, interleukin 1 receptor like 1, IL1RL1, interleukin 33 receptor
- External IDs: OMIM: 601203; MGI: 98427; GeneCards: IL33R
Available structures
PDB	Ortholog search: PDBe RCSB
PDB	List of PDB id codes 4KC3
Enzyme activity
EC #	BRENDA	ExPASy	KEGG	MetaCyc
3.2.2.6	↗	↗	↗	↗

Gene location (Human)
Chr.	Chromosome 2 (human)
Band	2q12.1	Start	102,311,502 bp
Band	2q12.1	End	102,352,037 bp

Gene location (Mouse)
Chr.	Chromosome 1 (mouse)
Band	1 B|1 19.19 cM	Start	40,468,730 bp
Band	1 B|1 19.19 cM	End	40,504,575 bp
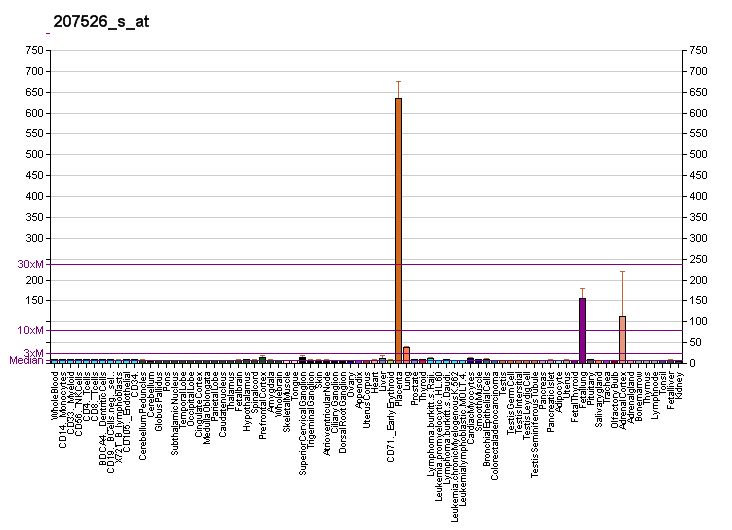
RNA expression pattern
Bgee	Human / Mouse (ortholog); Top expressed in: upper lobe of left lung; decidua; right lung; cartilage tissue; lower lobe of lung; left adrenal gland; left adrenal cortex; right adrenal gland; human kidney; body of stomach / Top expressed in: endothelial cell of lymphatic vessel; granulocyte; embryo; duodenum; lip; ileum; jejunum; muscle of thigh; esophagus; lactiferous gland; More reference expression data
BioGPS	More reference expression data
Gene ontology
Molecular function	interleukin-33 receptor activity; interleukin-1 receptor activity; cytokine receptor activity; protein binding; interleukin-33 binding
Cellular component	integral component of membrane; external side of plasma membrane; membrane; extracellular region; plasma membrane; extracellular matrix
Biological process	negative regulation of T-helper 1 type immune response; positive regulation of inflammatory response; negative regulation of interferon-gamma production; positive regulation of macrophage activation; negative regulation of I-kappaB kinase/NF-kappaB signaling; signal transduction; immune response; positive regulation of interleukin-5 production; interleukin-33-mediated signaling pathway
Sources:Amigo / QuickGO
Orthologs
Databases	NCBI: entry; OMA: entry
Species	Human	Mouse
Entrez	9173	17082
Ensembl	ENSG00000115602	ENSMUSG00000026069
UniProt	Q01638	P14719
RefSeq (mRNA)	NM_001282408; NM_003856; NM_016232; NM_173459	NM_001025602; NM_001294171; NM_010743
RefSeq (protein)	NP_001269337; NP_003847; NP_057316	NP_001020773; NP_001281100; NP_034873
Location (UCSC)	Chr 2: 102.31 – 102.35 Mb	Chr 1: 40.47 – 40.5 Mb
PubMed search
- Wikidata
View/Edit Human	View/Edit Mouse

Interleukin 33 receptor, also called interleukin 1 receptor like 1 or ST2, is a protein that in humans is encoded by the gene IL33R (previously IL1RL1).

== Function ==
IL1RL1 is a member of the Toll-like receptor superfamily based on the function of its intracellular TIR domain, but its extracellular region is composed of immunoglobulin domains. Unlike other members of the family IL1RL1 does not induce an inflammatory response through activation of NF-κB, although it does activate MAP kinases.

ST2 is a member of the interleukin 1 receptor family. The ST2 protein has two isoforms and is directly implicated in the progression of cardiac disease: a soluble form (referred to as soluble ST2 or sST2) and a membrane-bound receptor form (referred to as the ST2 receptor or ST2L). When the myocardium is stretched, the ST2 gene is upregulated, increasing the concentration of circulating soluble ST2. The ligand for ST2 is the cytokine Interleukin-33 (IL-33). Binding of IL-33 to the ST2 receptor, in response to cardiac disease or injury, such as an ischemic event, elicits a cardioprotective effect resulting in preserved cardiac function. This cardioprotective IL-33 signal is counterbalanced by the level of soluble ST2, which binds IL-33 and makes it unavailable to the ST2 receptor for cardioprotective signaling. As a result, the heart is subjected to greater stress in the presence of high levels of soluble ST2.

== Molecular biology ==
The gene is found on the long arm of chromosome 2 (2q12). It is 40,536 bases long and is located on the Watson (plus) strand. It encodes a protein of 556 amino acids (molecular weight 63,358 Da). Both membrane bound and soluble forms are known. The protein is known to interact with MyD88, IRAK1, IRAK4 and TRAF6. It appears to be essential for the normal function of T helper cells type 2 (Th2 cells) .

== Regulatory T cells ==
Alarmin IL-33 is constitutively expressed as a nuclear protein in all epithelial and endothelial cells, but also in secondary lymphoid organs. The biological and immunological function of this cytokine is mainly used in intestines, skin or lung epithelial tissues. Human keratinocytes are expressing this protein just after IFNg stimulation. Releasing of this cytokine is associated with necrosis or mechanical damage of epithelial or endothelial tissues caused by injury or inflammation. In contrast to related IL-1 cytokines, Il-33 does not need any enzymatic cleavage for activation and its function.

Two isoforms of ST2 were described in mammals. The membrane-bound ST2, which provides the activation pathway and soluble ST2 that originates from another promoter region of the il1rl1 gene and lacks the transmembrane and cytoplasmic domains. Interestingly, all the members of the IL-1 family such as receptor share a common intracellular Toll/IL-1 receptor (TIR) domain. IL-33 binds specifically to ST2, which in association with IL1RAcP to form a heterodimeric receptor and TIR domain dimerization together with MyD88 leads to activation of TRAF6. This signal transduction is not crucial. Activation of cell effector mechanisms trough IL-33/ST2 is present also in TRAF6 deficient mice.

Even though under IL-33 and IL-1 alarmins relationship, they have different aim to effector function of T regulatory cells. It was shown, that regulatory T cells deficient in IL-1 receptor (IL-1R) have more effective suppression capacity and phenotype stability. It shows, that IL-1 alarmins have an inhibition effect to Tregs.

There is clear correlation between T regulatory cell ST2 and Th2 specific transcription factor GATA3 expressions. Both molecules are present in T regulatory cells together. GATA3 transcription factor has been shown to promote ST2 gene expression by binding to an enhancer element of foxp3 gene. Foxp3 transcription factor is necessary for T regulatory cell phenotype stability and suppression function mainly based on gene silence effect. It was also shown, that after different cytokine IL-23 stimulation which leads to activation of STAT3, the suppressive effect of Tregs is decreased together with ST2 and Foxp3 expression. It looks, that GATA3 with presence of STAT3 has different preferences in gene expression regulation. This observation suggest longterm theory about crucial role on antagonistic aims of IL-33 and IL-23 to mucosal immunity and in their productions are able to cause IBDs.

In ST2+ T Regulatory cell is present soluble form of ST2 without transmembrane and cytosolic domain. After IL-33 signalization through membrane ST2 in Tregs indicates expression of both membrane and soluble isoforms. Releasing of soluble ST2 into extracellular space cause neutralization of IL-33 and regulation of inflammation.

It is well known, that high presence of T regulatory cells in cancer immune reaction do not mean good prognosis for oncologic patients. It was observed, that depletion of ST2 or IL-33 in colon or intestine cancer makes higher development of Th1 immune reaction with presence of CD8+ cytotoxic T cells, which are the most efficient in cancer treatment.

== Clinical significance ==
Mutations in this gene have been linked to atopic dermatitis and asthma.

The protein encoded by this gene serves as a cardiac biomarker.
