= Vladimir Sakharov (general) =

Russian general (1853–1920)

Vladimir Viktorovich Sakharov
- Владимир Викторович Сахаров
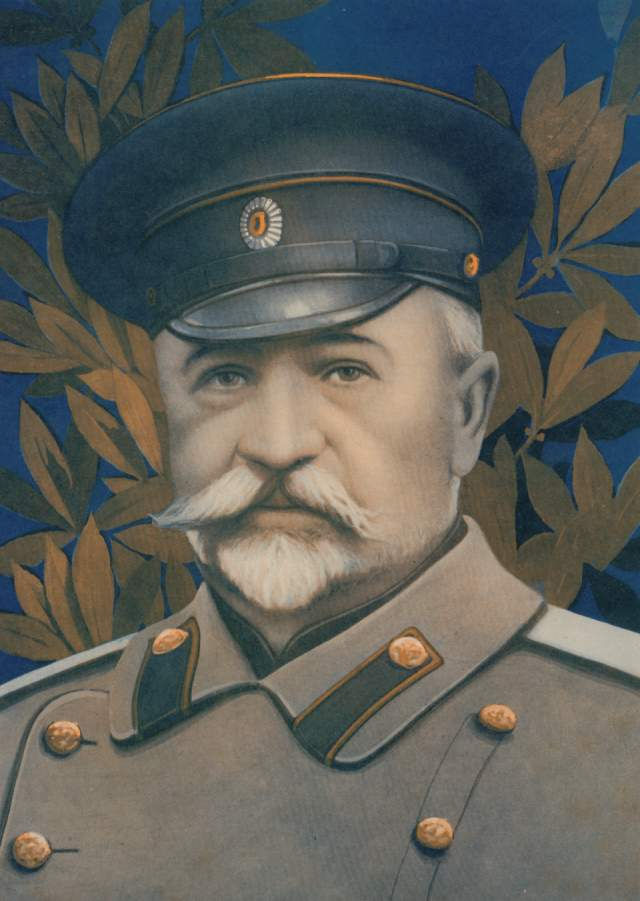
- Born: 20 May 1853; Moscow Governorate, Russian Empire
- Died: August 1920 (aged 67); Karasubazara, South Russia (now Bilohirsk, Ukraine)
- Alma mater: Second Moscow Cadet Corps
- Relatives: Viktor Sakharov (brother)
- Military career
- Allegiance: Russian Empire
- Branch: Imperial Russian Army
- Service years: 1869–1917
- Rank: General of the Cavalry
- Commands: Elisavetgrad Cavalry Cadet School; 38th Dragoon Vladimir Regiment; Border Guard Zaamur District; 1st Siberian Army Corps; 17th Army Corps; 7th Army Corps; 11th Army Corps; 11th Army; Danube Army
- Conflicts: Russo-Turkish War; Boxer Rebellion; Russo-Japanese War; Battle of Shaho; World War I; Battle of Galicia; Brusilov Offensive; Battle of Kowel
- Awards: Order of Saint Anna; Order of Saint Stanislaus; Order of Saint Vladimir; Golden Weapon for Bravery; Order of St. George

Vladimir Viktorovich Sakharov (Russian: Влади́мир Ви́кторович Са́харов; 20 May 1853 – August 1920) was a Russian general of the cavalry who served in the Russian Imperial Army. In his army career from 1869 to 1917, he served in the Russo-Turkish War of 1877–1878, the Russo-Japanese War, and World War I.

== Biography ==
=== Early life ===
Sakharov was a descendant of the nobility of the Moscow Governorate and was a member of the Russian Orthodox Church. In 1869 he graduated from the Second Moscow Cadet Corps.

=== Military career ===
Sakharov entered the Imperial Russian Army on 10 August 1869. He graduated from the 1st Military Pavlovsk School in 1871 and was promoted to podporuchik (ensign) on 11 August 1871. He was seconded to the Life Guards Grenadier Regiment and became Warrant Officer of the Guard on 17 August 1872. He was promoted to second lieutenant on 6 December 1874 and to lieutenant on 30 August 1876. In 1878 he graduated from the Nikolayev Academy of the General Staff in the first category. He was promoted from headquarters captain of the Guard to captain of the General Staff on 6 January 1878 and was seconded to the Cavalry Training Squadron.

Sakharov took part on the Russo-Turkish War of 1877-1878. On 25 April 1878 he became senior adjutant to the headquarters of the 16th Infantry Division. On 23 December 1879 he became assistant senior adjutant of the headquarters of the army.

On 31 January 1879, Sakharov took up duties as the clerk of the educational section of the Riga Infantry Junker School. On 4 November 1880 he became assistant class inspector of the 2nd Military Konstantinovsky School, and he was promoted to lieutenant colonel on 12 April 1881. On 23 October 1881 he again was seconded to the Cavalry Training Squadron. On 30 June 1882 he began duty as director of affairs in the educational section of the Officer Cavalry School and received a promotion to colonel on 8 April 1884. On 4 April 1886 he began duty as the head of the Elisavetgrad Cavalry Cadet School.

On 6 January 1891, Sakharov became chief of staff of the 14th Cavalry Division and on 18 March 1891 he took up duties as chief of staff of the Kronstadt Fortress. He served as commanding officer of the 38th Dragoon Vladimir Regiment from 24 May 1893 to 12 November 1897. He was promoted to major general on 12 November 1897 and appointed to the post of chief of staff of the 5th Army Corps. On 30 June 1899 he became chief of staff of the Separate Corps of the Border Guard.

Sakharov served in China in 1900–1901 during the Boxer Rebellion and its aftermath. He was commander of the forces in northern Manchuria from 30 June 1900 to 4 September 1900. For military distinction he was awarded the Golden Weapon for Bravery on 18 August 1901. He was promoted to lieutenant general “for military distinction” on 31 January 1901, and from 16 February to 7 May 1901 was the head of the Zaamur District of the Border Guard. On 7 May 1901 he became commanding officer of the 4th Cavalry Division. On 29 November 1903 he took command of the 1st Siberian Army Corps.

=== Russo-Japanese War ===
The Russo-Japanese War began on 8 February 1904 while Sakharov was in command of the 1st Siberian Army Corps, but it did not see combat before he relinquished command in April 1904. On 5 April 1904, he became had of the field headquarters of the 1st Manchurian Army, participating in the Battle of Shaho in October 1904. On 18 October 1904, he became chief of staff to the commander-in-chief of all land and naval forces operating against Japan, General Aleksey Kuropatkin. He performed those duties until 17 March 1905, and was awarded the Golden Weapon for Bravery with Diamonds on 26 November 1904. He served as a member of the Alexander Committee on the Wounded from 17 March 1905 to 3 January 1906, becoming temporary commander of the 17th Army Corps on 24 September 1905 in the immediate aftermath of the war while continuing to serve on the committee.

=== Between the wars ===
From 3 January to 21 April 1906, Sakharov was at the service of the commander-in-chief of all land and naval forces in the Far East. On 21 April 1906 he was seconded to the Stavka (General Staff). He took command of the 7th Army Corps on 11 October 1906 and was promoted to general of the cavalry on 13 April 1908. On 4 November 1911 he returned to duty on the Alexander Committee. While remaining on the committee, he simultaneously became the commander of the 11th Army Corps on 13 December 1913.

=== The First World War ===
When the Russian Empire entered World War I on 1 August 1914, Sakharov still was in command of the 11th Army Corps, which was a part of the 3rd Army. His corps consisted of the 11th Infantry Division, 32nd Infantry Division, and 11th Cavalry Division. He commanded the corps during the Battle of Galicia in August 1914.

From 22 August 1915 to 4 September 1915 Sakharov served as the Military Governor of Orenburg, where he was chief of the prison and commanded the troops of the Orenburg Cossacks. However, during this 14-day period — the shortest term of office of any Orenburg governor — he never set foot in Orenburg, and he continued to direct the operations of the 11th Army Corps. On 4 September 1915, Sakharov officially returned to the command of the 11th Army Corps, and on the same day simultaneously returned to duty as a member of the Alexander Committee on the Wounded.

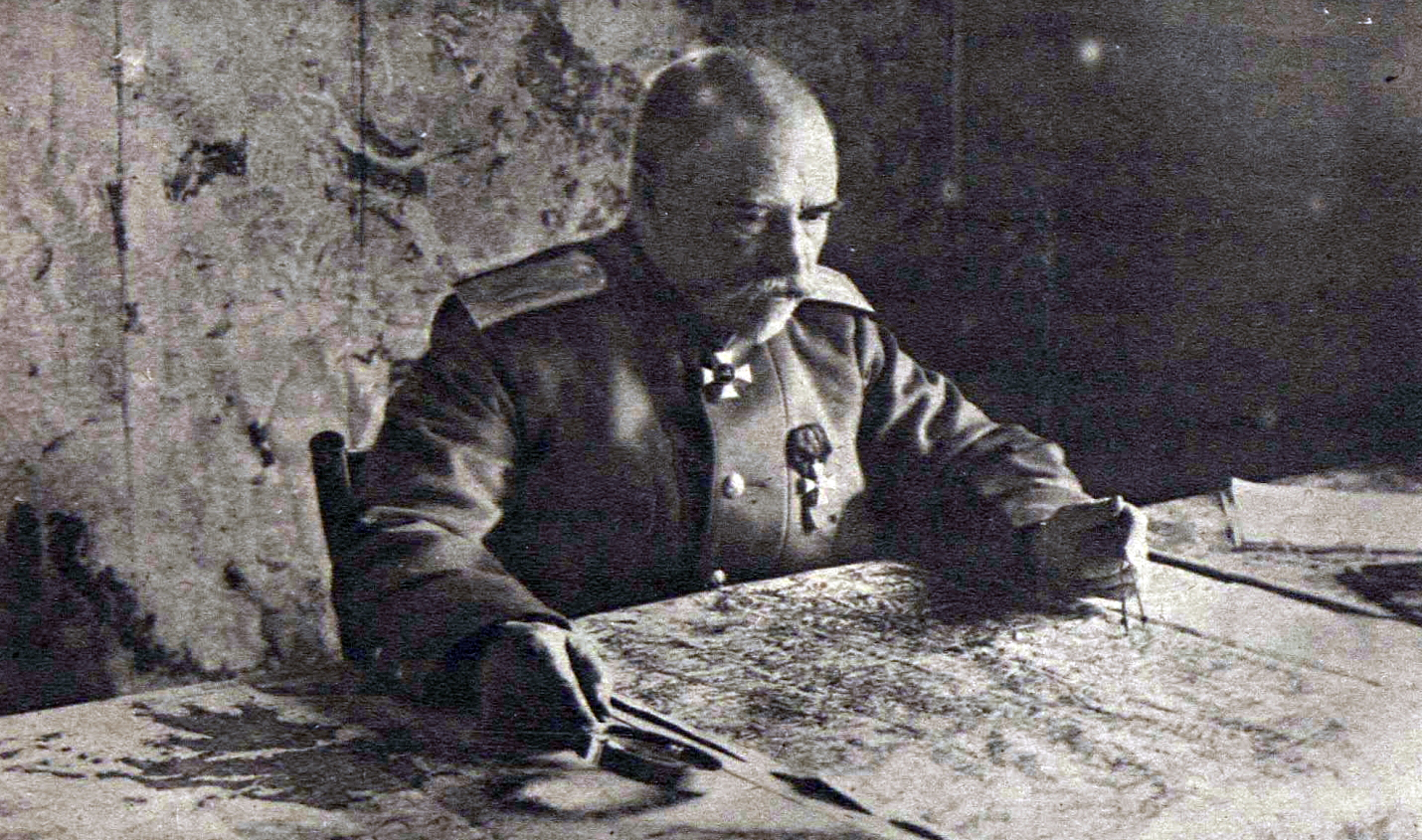
Sakharov in 1916.

On 25 October 1915, Sakharov became the commander of the 11th Army, which operated under the command of the Southwestern Front. Under his command, the 11th Army participated in the Brusilov Offensive in 1916. On 19 October 1916 he took command of the Danube Army, which the Imperial Russian Army had created to provide assistance to Romania during the Romanian Campaign. After the Imperial Russian Army created the Romanian Front based on the Danube Army and the remnants of the Romanian Army, Sakharov was appointed assistant to the commander-in-chief of the Romanian Army, King Ferdinand I of Romania, on 12 December 1916.

=== Revolution and Russian Civil War ===
After the February Revolution overthrew Tsar Nicholas II and resulted in the creation of the Russian Republic under the Russian Provisional Government, Sakharov was removed from command of the Romanian Front on 2 April 1917. He remained in active duty in the new Russian Army, continuing only as a member of the Alexander Committee on the Wounded, on which he had served since September 1915.

After the Bolsheviks seized power in the October Revolution on 7 November 1917 and the Russian Civil War broke out, Sakharov was dismissed from the army. He lived in Romania, and then in the Crimea. According to an account by P. V. Makarov, adjutant to General Vladimir May-Mayevsky of the White Army, Sakharov was traveling in a group of three carriages headed toward the Crimean village of Shabuldy — not realizing that forces of the Red Army and Green Army had occupied the village — in 1920, when he and his companions were captured by a regiment of Green Army partisans hostile to the White Army after mistaking them for a friendly force resting by the roadside. Sakharov was among five men in the carriages that the partisans shot near Karasubazar in the Crimea, the remainder of the occupants of the carriages having agreed to join the partisans.

== Personal life ==
Sakharov had a son, Dmitry Vladimirovich Sakharov, who was born in 1893.

Sakharov's older brother, Viktor Sakharov (1848–1905), also pursued a military career, and reached the rank of lieutenant general.

== Decorations ==
- Order of Saint Anna Third Class (1879)
- Order of Saint Stanislaus Third Class (1880)
- Order of Saint Anna Second Class (1888)
- Order of Saint Vladimir Fourth Class (1892)
- Order of Saint Vladimir Third Class (1900)
- Golden Weapon for Bravery (1901)
- Golden Weapon for Bravery with diamonds (1904)
- Order of Saint Stanislaus First Class with Swords (1904)
- Order of Saint Anna First Class (6 December 1911)
- Order of St. George Fourth Class (27 September 1914) "For distinction in action against the enemy"
- Order of St. George Third Class (27 October 1915) "For the successful action in August and September 1915 in the area Gayvoronki and Sokolusa, including the taking of some 17,000 prisoners"
