= Andrey Selivanov =

Andrey Nikolayevich Selivanov
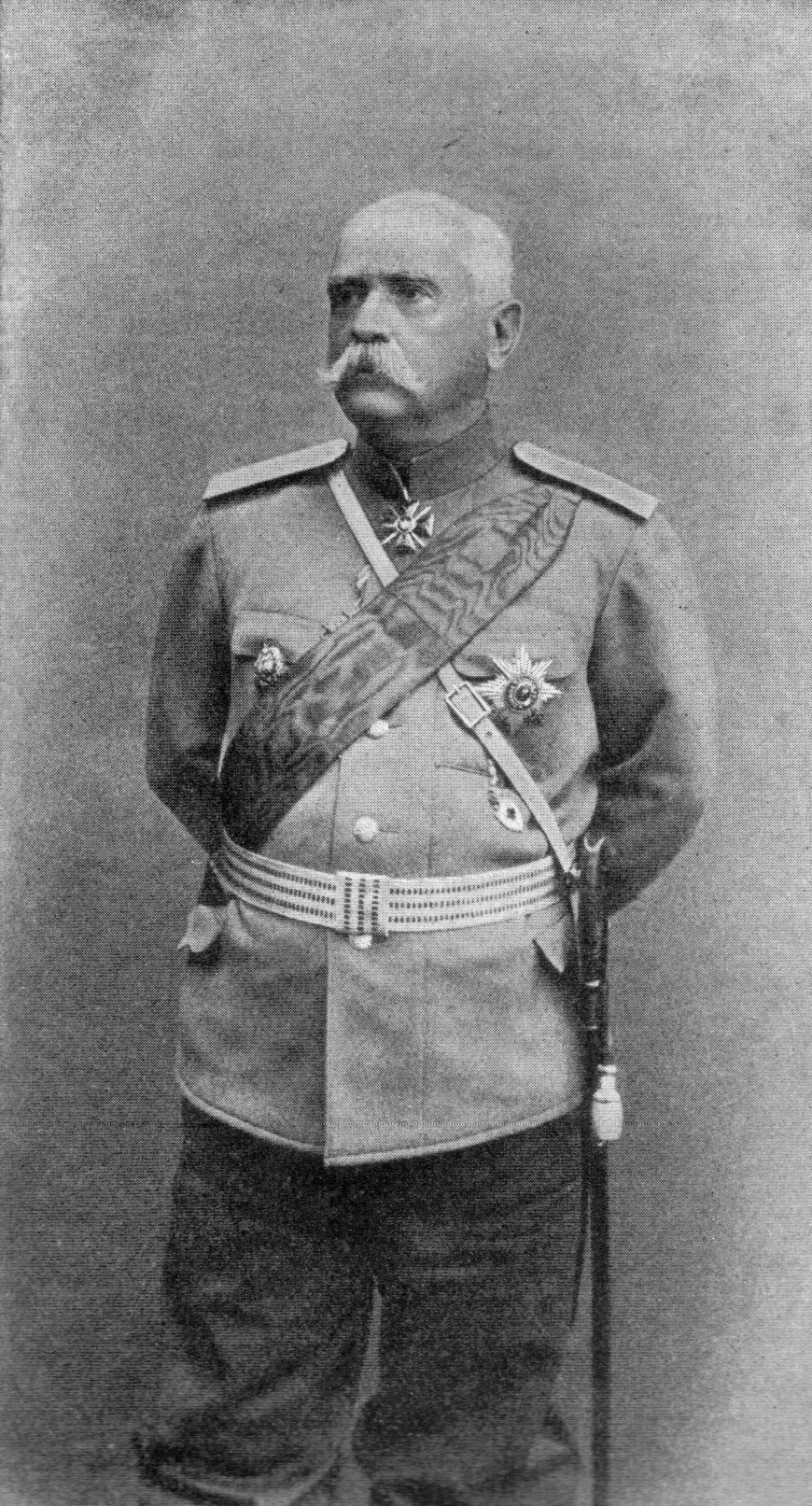
- Born: 5 August 1847
- Died: 15 July 1917 (aged 69)
- Military career
- Allegiance: Russian Empire
- Branch: (Russian Empire) Imperial Russian Army
- Rank: General
- Commands: 13th Infantry Division (Russian Empire); Russian Eleventh Army
- Conflicts: Russo-Turkish War; Russo-Japanese War; World War I; Siege of Przemyśl
- Awards: Order of Saint George

Andrey Nikolayevich Selivanov (5 August 1847 – 15 July 1917) was a Russian politician and general notable for capturing Przemyśl during World War I.

== Biography ==
Selivanov served in the Russian army during the Russo-Turkish War of 1877-1878 and the Russo-Japanese War, winning distinction for both conflicts. Selivanov served as Governor-General of Irkutsk from 1906 until 1910 when he became a member of the State Council of Imperial Russia.

In 1914 during World War I, Selivanov was appointed commander of the forces besieging Przemyśl. The siege had begun under the command of Radko Dimitriev on September 24, 1914. Dimitriev's Russian Third Army was forced to suspend siege operations during Paul von Hindenburg's offensive against Warsaw in 1914. After defeat at the battle of the Vistula River, Hindenburg and his Austrian allies retreated and Dimitriev resumed siege operations. However the Third Army was moved away from the Przemyśl front. General Selivanov then assumed command of the Russian siege forces which were designated the Russian Eleventh Army. Selivanov halted the frontal assaults which had characterized earlier Russian attempts to subdue the fortress. Selivanov settled into starving the garrison into submission. Defeat became inevitable for the defenders when Austrian relief efforts were turned back and Selivanov's Eleventh Army overran Przemyśl's northern defenses. For successfully capturing Przemyśl, Selivanov was awarded the Order of Saint George, 3rd Degree.

On April 5, 1915, Selivanov resigned from the army due to poor health and resumed his duties in the State Council. He died on July 15, 1917.

Preceded by Konstantin Tserpitsky	Commander of the 13th Infantry Division (Russian Empire); 1903-1904	Succeeded by
Preceded by	Commander of the 11th Army (Russian Empire); 1914-1915	Succeeded by Dmitry Shcherbachev
