= Yevgeny Shilovsky =

Soviet military officer (1889–1952)

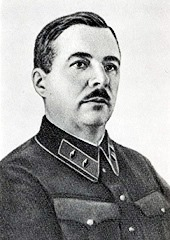
- Born: 3 December [O.S. 21 November] 1889; Savinki, Lebedyansky Uyezd, Tambov Governorate, Russian Empire
- Died: 27 May 1952 (aged 62) Moscow, Russian SFSR, Soviet Union
- Buried: Novodevichy Cemetery, Moscow
- Allegiance: Russian Empire; Soviet Union
- Branch: Imperial Russian Army; Soviet Red Army
- Rank: Lieutenant-general (Soviet Union)
- Conflicts: World War I; Russian Civil War; World War II
- Alma mater: Second Moscow Cadet Corps
- Spouses: Yelena Nürenberg (m. 1921; div. 1932) Marianna Tolstaya (m. 1935)
- Children: three

Yevgeny Aleksandrovich Shilovsky (Russian: Евге́ний Алекса́ндрович Ши́ловский; 2 December 1889 – 27 May 1952) was a Russian and Soviet lieutenant-general and military instructor.

== Biography ==
Yevgeny Shilovskiy was born in to a large and impoverished family of a hereditary nobleman.

In 1901, he entered the cadet corps in Oryol, a year later he transferred to the Second Moscow Cadet Corps which he successfully graduated from in 1907, and then from the Konstantinovskoye Artillery School in 1910, from which he graduated as a second lieutenant.

In October 1913, he entered the Nikolaev Academy of the General Staff. In April 1914, he was promoted to lieutenant. At the beginning of World War I, classes at the academy were discontinued, and the students returned to their units. Lieutenant Shilovskiy went to the front with his artillery brigade, and participated in combat operations as a junior officer of the brigade. For his distinction he was awarded two military orders and promoted to the rank of captain. From May 1915, he served as a general staff officer at the headquarters of the 36th Army Corps, and from October 1915, as an officer at the headquarters of the 43rd Infantry Division on the Southwestern Front.

In January 1917, he was recalled from the front to continue his studies at the academy, where it was decided to resume classes. Demobilized in February 1918 with the rank of captain.

In September 1918, Shilovskiy was summoned to Moscow to work at the Supreme Military Inspectorate of the RSFSR.

From February 1919, he was an assistant to the head of the organizational department of the headquarters of the People's Commissariat for Military and Naval Affairs of Ukraine, then the head of the defense department, the head of the organizational department, and the head of the Field Headquarters of the People's Commissariat for Military and Naval Affairs of the Ukrainian SSR. He directly participated in the formation of units of the Red Army in Ukraine and in military operations against the Petliura Army of the Ukrainian People's Republic, "green" formations and the Armed Forces of the South of Russia of General A.I. Denikin near Kiev, in the area of Tripolye, Vasilkov, near Zhmerynka, and near Pereslavl. He took part in the Soviet-Polish War and in the defeat of Bułak-Bałachowicz's detachments near Mozyr in November 1920. From July to October 1921 he was assistant to the chief of staff of the Western Front.

From October 1921, he served at the Frunze Military Academy of the Red Army as a teacher of operational art, head of the training department and assistant to the head of the academy.

From October 1928, Shilovskiy was Chief of Staff of the Moscow Military District. From February 1931, he worked at the Zhukovsky Red Army Air Force Academy, where he was senior head of the operational art department, head of the operations faculty, and chief of staff of the academy. From December 1936, Shilovsky was a senior lecturer, and from May 1940, head of the operational art department of the Red Army General Staff Academy.

On August 3, 1941, Lieutenant-general Shilovskiy was appointed acting chief of the General Staff Academy. He was instructed to evacuae the academy from Moscow to Ufa and urgently restructure the educational process. During the Second World War Shilovsky made a significant contribution to the development of the theory of deep operations. From August 1942 until the last day of his life, he was the chief of the military history department of this academy.

He joined the Communist Party in 1943. Yevgeny Shilovskiy died of a stroke in his office on May 27, 1952. He was buried at the Novodevichy Cemetery in Moscow.

== Awards ==
=== Russian Empire ===
- Order of St. Anna, 4th degree
- Order of St. Stanislaus, 3rd degree, with swords and bow
- St. George's Sword
- Order of St. Vladimir, 4th degree with swords and bow
- Order of St. Anna, 3rd class, with swords and bow
- Order of St. Stanislaus 2nd degree with swords
- Highest Benevolence
- Order of St. George, 4th degree

=== Soviet Union ===
- Order of Lenin
- 4 Orders of the Red Banner
- Order of Suvorov, 2nd degree
- Order of the Red Star
