= Battle of Vyazma =

1812 battle during the French invasion of Russia

- Part of the French invasion of Russia
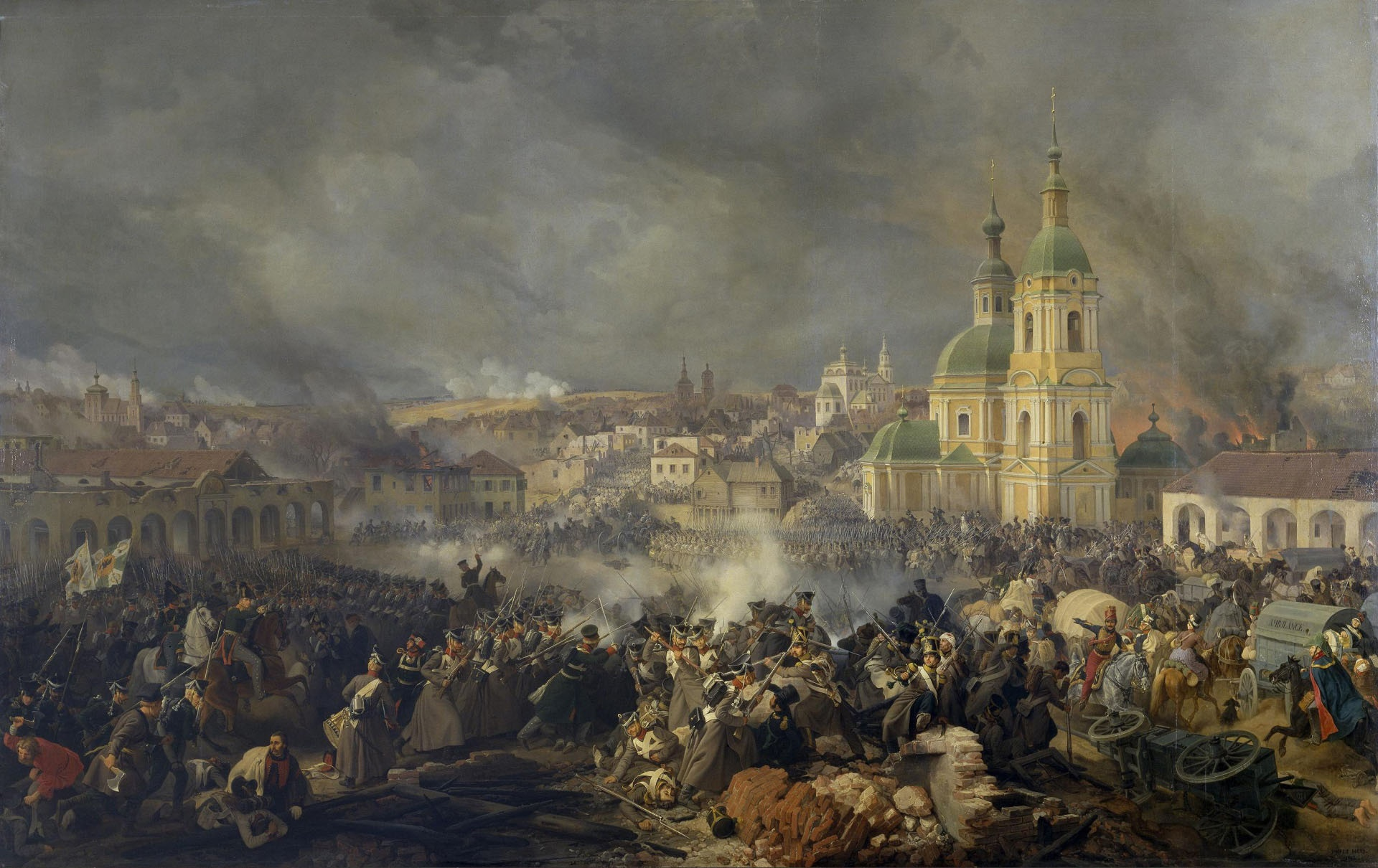
- Battle of Vyazma, by Peter von Hess
Date	3 November 1812 (22 Oct. by OS)
Location	Vyazma, Russian Empire 55°12′N 34°15′E
Result	Russian victory

Belligerents
Russian Empire	(First French Empire) French Empire; Kingdom of Naples; Duchy of Warsaw; Kingdom of Bavaria; Kingdom of Westphalia; Kingdom of Württemberg; Grand Duchy of Hesse; Grand Duchy of Berg; Grand Duchy of Baden

Commanders and leaders
(Russian Empire) Mikhail Miloradovich (Russian Empire) Ivan Paskevich (Russian Empire) Matvei Platov	(First French Empire) Eugène de Beauharnais (Note: The historian Gaston Bodart identifies Eugène as a supreme commander at Vyazma. Indeed, among the important things Eugène did in the battle was that he managed to save the surrounded Davout from complete destruction; through Eugène's defensive actions (in cooperation with Ney, who joined later) to rescue Davout, the French organised the retreat of 25,000 engaged troops in partially good order while sufficiently delaying the Russian advance (see § Action). Thanks in large part to Eugène's actions, 84% of the local troops were saved (approx. 31,500 out of 37,500).) (First French Empire) Louis Nicolas Davout (Note: Only Davout initially, before reinforcement by the remaining commanders.) (First French Empire) Michel Ney; Józef Antoni Poniatowski; Józef Zajączek

Units involved
General of the Infantry Miloradovich: • II Infantry Corps; • IV Infantry Corps; • II Cavalry Corps; • III Cavalry Corps; • Paskevich's 26th Division; • Platov's Cossacks	Davout's I Corps; Eugène's IV Corps; Ney's III Corps; Poniatowski's / Zajączek's V Corps

Strength
27,000 troops 80 cannons	37,500 (13,000 from Davout's corps; 25,000 engaged)

Casualties and losses
1,800–2,500	4,000 killed and wounded 2,000 prisoners 3 cannons § Casualties

The Battle of Vyazma (3 November 1812; 22 October by OS), occurred at the beginning of Napoleon's retreat from Moscow. In this encounter, a Russian force commanded by General of the Infantry Miloradovich pressed and inflicted heavy losses on the rear guard of the Grande Armée. The Grande Armée was retreating back along the already devastated road, experiencing a shortage of food, a consequence of the Battle of Maloyaroslavets. Although the French thwarted Miloradovich's goal of encircling and destroying the corps of Marshal Davout, they withdrew in a partial state of disorder due to ongoing Russian harassment and heavy artillery bombardments, and the town of Vyazma itself was captured in heavy fighting by Miloradovich's troops, namely the 11th Infantry Division under the command of Major General P. Choglokov (from Ostermann-Tolstoy's IV Infantry Corps) and the Cossacks of Ataman Platov. In addition to his four corps, Miloradovich also coordinated General Paskevich's 26th Division and those Cossacks around Vyazma. The French were driven out of all their defensive positions during the battle. The French reversal at Vyazma, although indecisive, was significant due to its damaging morale impact on several corps of Napoleon's retreating army, namely, the corps of Davout, Eugène, Marshal Ney, and Prince Poniatowski. From then on, Napoleon's rearguard withdrew in disarray.

== Background ==
Napoleon's objective at this stage of the retreat was to lead the Grande Armée to the closest French supply depot, Smolensk, but the road from Moscow was 270 miles (430 km) long and impossible to defend. It was choked by partisan activity and Cossack raiding parties. French supply trains were routinely wiped out and 15,000 French troops were captured along this road in September and October alone. The French departed Moscow on 18 October, and after having a southern route to Smolensk denied them as a result of the Battle of Maloyaroslavets (24 October), they were compelled to backtrack and retreat along the same road used in their earlier advance on Moscow. Because the territory alongside this road had been economically ravaged by earlier French campaigning, the retreat imposed on the Grande Armée extreme conditions of privation and attrition. Lack of foodstuffs soon led to demoralization, disorder and even starvation in the French ranks.

By 3 November, the day of the action at Vyazma, the retreating Grande Armée was stretched out in a column 60 miles (100 km) long. The head of the column, Junot's VIII Corps, was at Dorogobuzh, with Davout's I Corps, serving as the army's rearguard, located at the tail of the army just east of Vyazma. Between these two endpoints were, running west to east, the Imperial Guard, Joachim Murat's troops, Michel Ney's III Corps, Poniatowski's V Corps, (Note: According to Od Jakobina do księcia namiestnika (Jadwiga Nadzieja (1988), Wydawnictwo "Śląsk", ISBN 978-83-216-0682-8, pp. 212–213), Józef Poniatowski was wounded and from 1 November Zajączek commanded the corps.) and Eugène's IV Corps.

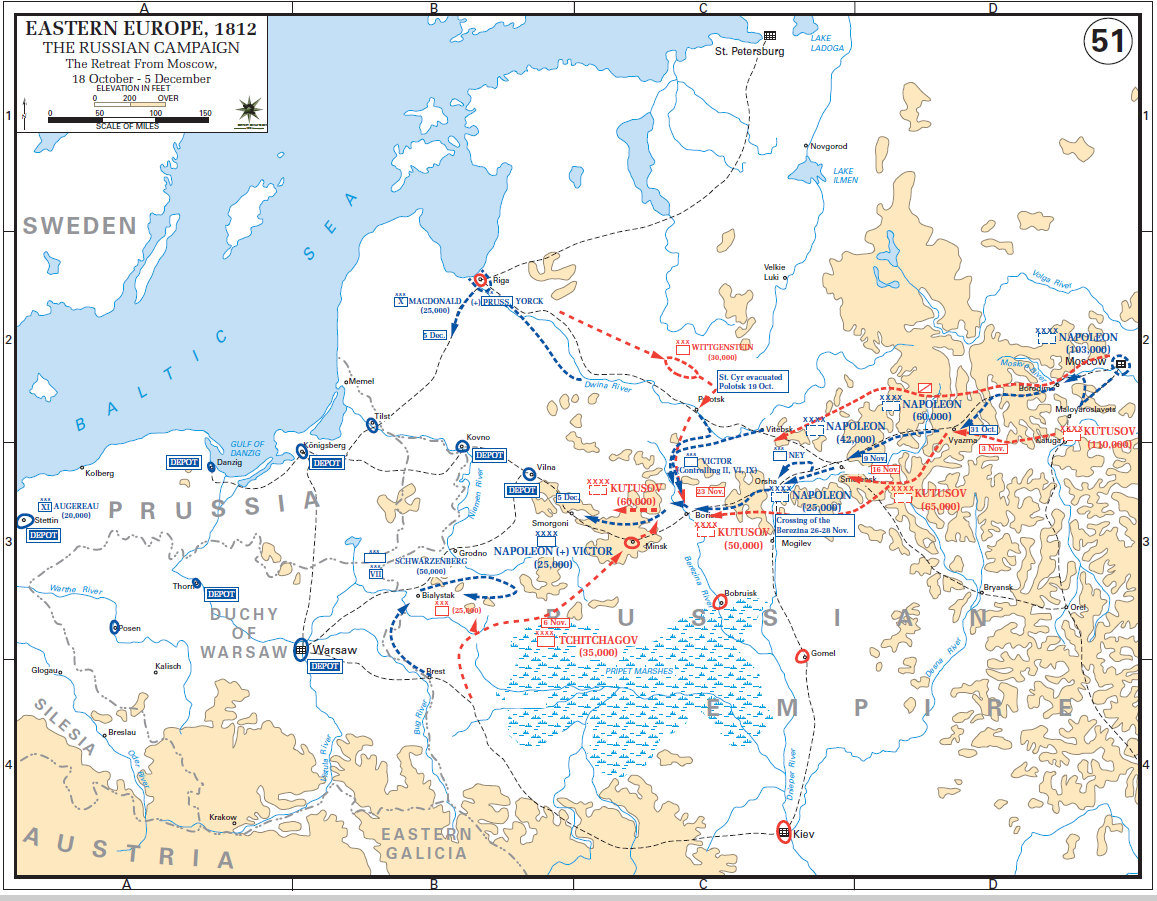
Movements of the French and Russian armies during Napoleon's retreat from Moscow, from 18 October to 5 December 1812

At this point, the French retreat was harassed by Cossack attacks at every juncture, Davout's corps in particular being beleaguered by Russian attacks. By 2 November, Napoleon had grown dissatisfied with Davout's management of rearguard activities, and ordered Ney to remain in Vyazma, to allow the I, IV, and V Corps to bypass him, and to assume rearguard duties himself.

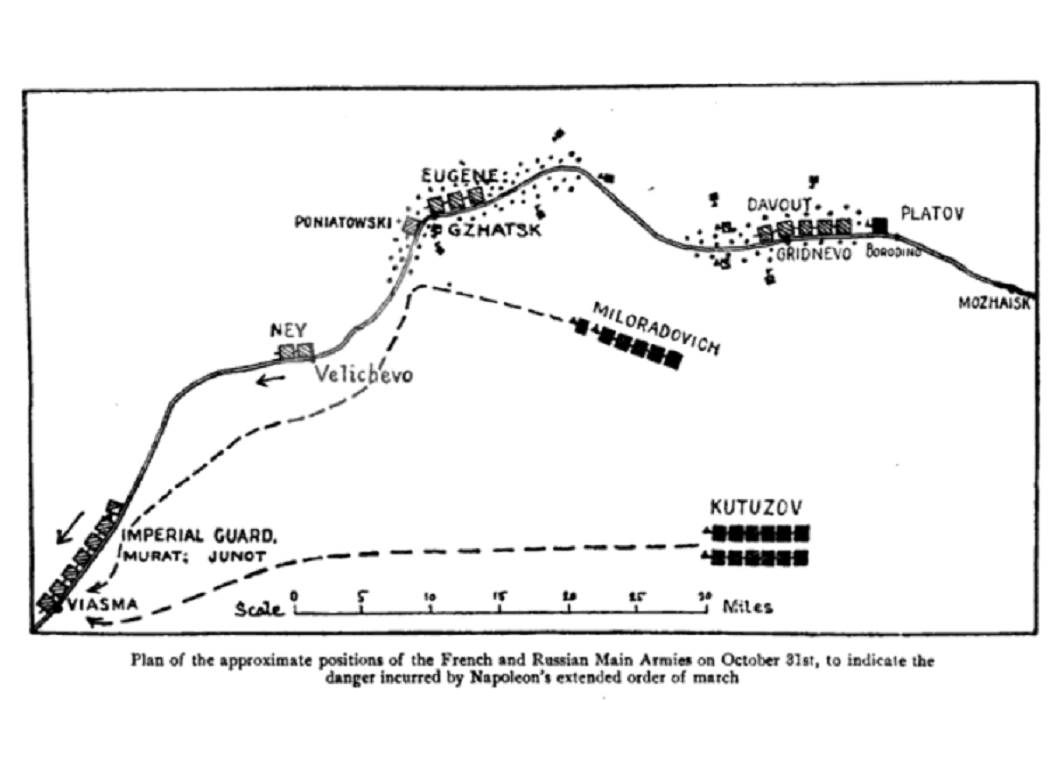
Campaign situation on 31 October, three days before the Battle of Vyazma

The Russians, meanwhile, organized themselves into three groups while pursuing the French. First, following Davout closely were 5,000 Cossacks commanded by Ataman Platov. This group was supported by General Ivan Paskevich's 26th Division, with 4,000 troops. Marching slightly to the south was General Miloradovich with the II and IV Infantry Corps, some 14,000 troops in all, and the II and III Cavalry Corps, which amounted to 3,500 soldiers. Miloradovich coordinated the activity of all of these troops, including those of Platov and Paskevich. He had at his disposal 19,000 infantry, 8,000 cavalry, and 80 guns. The main Russian army led by Mikhail Kutuzov, some 70,000 troops in all, marched further to the south.

On the evening of 2 November, while conducting reconnaissance south of the Smolensk-Moscow road, Miloradovich, together with his cavalry commanders General Korff and General Sievers, noticed a gap between the I Corps, situated to the east at Fedorovskoye, and the troops of the IV and V Corps located to the west just outside Vyazma. Recognizing an opportunity to isolate and destroy Davout's corps, the aggressive Miloradovich decided to attack early the next morning.

== Action ==
=== Russian cavalry attacks ===
At 8 am on 3 November, Miloradovich's cavalry attacked the disorganized French column holding the length of road which separated the I Corps from the IV and V Corps. Miloradovich also ordered his artillery, positioned on nearby heights, to begin a cannonade. With beautiful warm weather with bright sunshine the attack was a complete success, as it captured the French IV Corps baggage train and sent the French troops fleeing in disarray. Miloradovich then placed infantrymen and horse batteries astraddle the road, thereby severing Davout's connection with the rest of the French army.

Simultaneous to Miloradovich's attack to the west of Davout, Platov's Cossacks attacked Davout from the east, supported by Paskevich's troops. Davout's infantrymen formed squares to meet the attack from Platov and Paskevich, and his artillerymen set up their pieces to return Miloradovich's fire. The 13,000 exhausted, hunger-weakened soldiers of Davout's Corps were now at risk of being overwhelmed and destroyed by the Russians.

=== Eugène's counterattack ===
Fortunately for Davout, there was a weakness in the Russian plan of attack, in that the Russian cavalry had attacked the Vyazma-Fedorovskoye road that morning without the full support of the II and IV Infantry Corps (led by Duke Eugen of Württemberg and General Ostermann-Tolstoy respectively), which were located to the south and would not be able to reach the battlefield until 10 am, two hours after the action commenced. Miloradovich, fearing that the gap between Davout and the rest of the French army would close before he could exploit it, felt it expedient to launch his cavalry attack without having the balance of his infantry on hand. Lacking sufficient numbers of infantrymen to consolidate their hold on the Vyazma-Fedorovskoye road, Miloradovich's cavalry was vulnerable to a determined French counterattack.

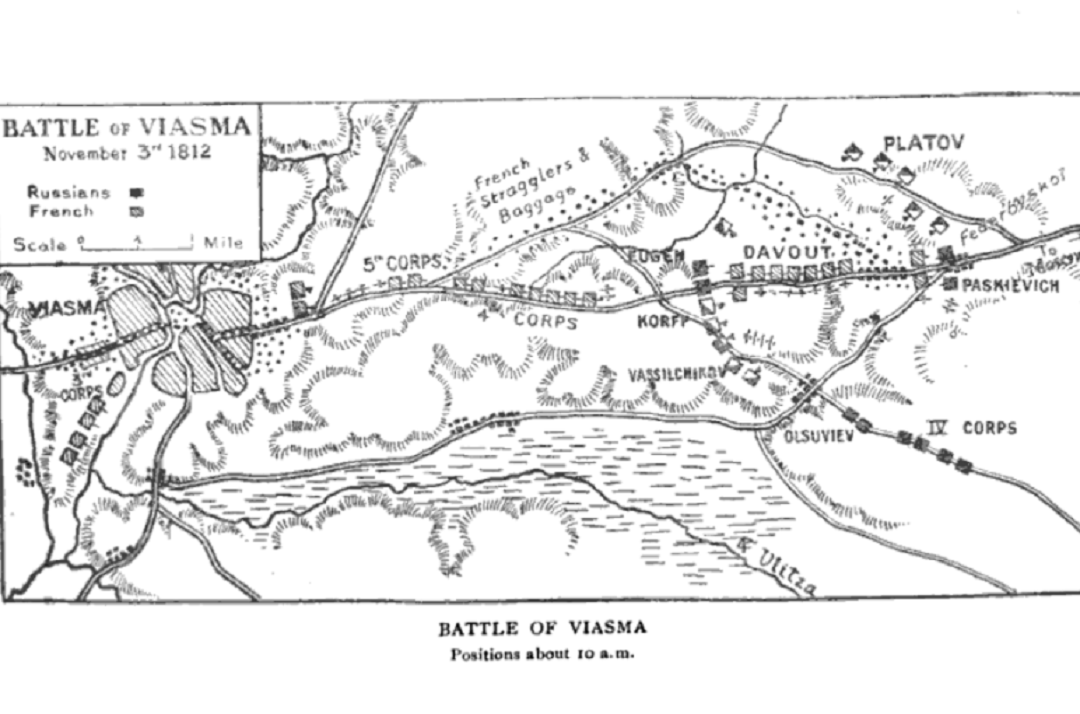
Battle of Vyazma, situation at 10 am on 3 November 1812

At this juncture, Davout's fortunes changed for the better. His infantrymen to the east repulsed Platov and Paskevich with steady, disciplined musketfire. More importantly, Eugène heard the cannon fire engulfing Davout's position to the rear, and immediately ordered his troops to counterattack Miloradovich and regain possession of the Vyazma-Fedorovskoye road.

Eugène's counterattack fell on the rear of the troops Miloradovich had positioned on the road facing Davout. This counterattack was conducted by two of Eugène's Italian divisions, one division of Poles from the V Corps, and a single regiment of troops sent to the scene by Ney, whose III Corps was positioned in the heights near Vyazma. Davout, upon seeing these troops advancing to rescue him, sent his infantrymen to attack as well. Miloradovich's cavalry and his small body of infantrymen were now attacked from the east and the west, including being enveloped in French artillery shot, and were compelled to retreat from the road. Thanks to Eugène's counterattack, a passageway had been created on the Vyazma-Fedorovskoye road for Davout to continue his retreat.

=== Miloradovich repositions his troops ===
The Russians at this point had been repulsed at all points, but they were hardly finished with the battle. Having pulled back from Eugène's attack, Miloradovich ordered his troops to reposition themselves parallel to the road. A heavy cannonade was then commenced against Davout's troops as they retreated toward Vyazma. Davout's artillery was unable to respond effectively to the Russian fire, and panic broke out among his troops.

Louis Philippe, comte de Ségur, an observer of the action on the French side, describes this moment in the battle thus:

…disorder reigned in the I Corps – the one commanded by Davout. The sudden maneuver, the surprise, and particularly the tragic example of the crowd of unhorsed, unarmed cavalrymen running up and down in blind fright, threw this corps into utter confusion. This spectacle encouraged the enemy, who credited themselves with a victory. Their artillery, superior in strength, galloped into position and, opening an oblique fire on our lines, began mowing our men down, while our own guns were coming back to us at a snail's pace from Vyazma.

The damage wrought by the Russian artillery on Davout's troops was such that many of them were compelled to abandon the road, and to retreat across an open field in their desperation to reach safety behind Eugène's position. By 10 am, when the rest of Miloradovich's infantry arrived, Davout's battered corps had taken shelter behind Eugène.

Eugène's troops, too, came under pressure from the Russians and were obliged to fall back. General Sir Robert Wilson, an Englishman who observed the action from the Russian side, describes the combat at this moment as follows:

On the remainder of the Russian infantry coming up (Eugen of Württemberg and Ostermann-Tolstoy), Miloradovich renewed the attack under protection of a superior and admirably served artillery. The enemy fell back on a second position, between Rjavets and the farm of Rieaupiere, and thence, when menaced on both flanks, to some heights in front of Vyazma, where they were reinforced by the two Italian divisions, the Italian guards, and the corps of Ney.

According to Segur, the Russian cannonshot and musketry at this point were "frighteningly effective."

At 2:00 pm, Davout, Eugène, and Poniatowski/Zajączek conferred, and they concluded that victory was not possible given the disorganization in the French units caused by the Russian aggression. Soon, the three French corps had retreated into Vyazma.

At some point prior to the three French corps falling back to a position on the heights protected by Ney, Miloradovich urgently requested reinforcements from Kutusov, as he recognized that the French were vulnerable and the opportunity for a great victory may have presented itself. Kutusov, who was now within earshot of the battle with his main army (just 20 miles (32 km) away), sent only the 3,000 cuirassiers of General Uvarov and nothing more.

=== Final Russian assault on Vyazma ===
At 4 pm, the fighting spread into the town of Vyazma itself, which at this point was consumed by flames. By now the 11th Infantry Division of General Choglokov (from Ostermann-Tolstoy's corps), as well as detachments of Platov's Cossacks were engaging the French in torrid, close quarters combat on the streets of Vyazma. The French were hard pressed, and had to fight desperately to hold the Russians off while evacuating the town.

By 8 pm, the fighting was over. The corps of Davout, Eugène, and Poniatowski/Zajączek had retreated west of Vyazma, bruised but safe. Ney's rearguard was last to withdraw from the town, suffering heavy losses in a final bayonet fight with a force of Russian grenadiers.

In order to cover their retreat, the French had set large sections of Vyazma on fire, resulting in many wounded from both sides burning to death. Worse yet, the French are reported to have locked civilians and Russian prisoners in buildings before setting them aflame. Russian troops pouring into the town were able to save some of these victims.

That evening, Ney's corps remained on the western outskirts of Vyazma to block the Russians. However, given the Russians' aggression, great danger remained, and according to Caulaincourt, even Ney had to "continue his retreating movement before dawn in order not to risk the loss of his troops."

The next day, withdrawing along a road heaped for miles with burning, overturned wagons, and blown-up ammunition caches, Ney dispatched an entire series of grim reports to Napoleon detailing the lost battle.

== Consequences ==
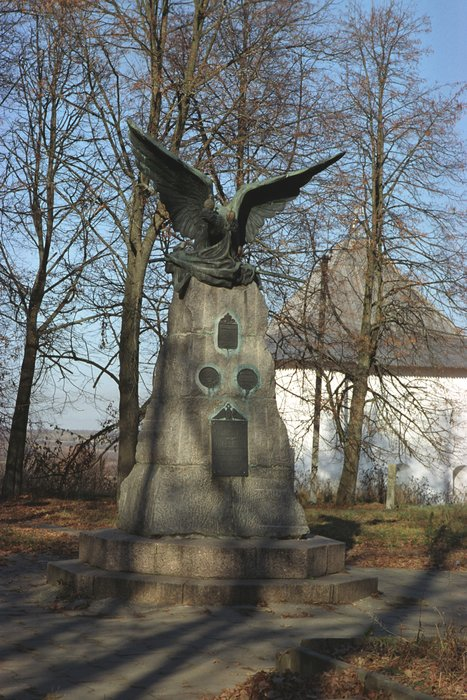
The Russian double-headed eagle fluttering Napoleon's banner. A monument in Vyazma, commemorating the Russian victory over Napoleon.

The Battle of Vyazma represented a defeat of the Grande Armée's rearguard. The shock of the Russian attack reduced many French units to a state of disarray, and owing to the speed with which their retreat had to be resumed, order was never restored within them. These abandoned, disorganized units became easy targets for Cossack raids in the following days.

General Armand de Caulaincourt, the famed memoirist who participated in the events of 1812 from the French side, perhaps best summarized the effects of Vyazma on his army with the following rueful words:

Until then – as long, that is, as it had to withstand alone the attacks of the enemy – the First Corps had maintained its honor and reputation, although it was fiercely attacked and its formation broken by the artillery. This momentary disorder was conspicuous because it was the first time that these gallant infantry broke ranks and compelled their dogged commander to give ground. I have related these painful details because from this incident must be dated our disorganization and misfortunes. The First Corps, which on taking the field was the largest and finest, a rival to the Guard, was thenceforward the hardest hit; and the evil spread.

But Napoleon reached Smolensk thus saving the remnants of his troops for the subsequent Battle of Krasnoi.

=== Casualties ===
Russian casualties at Vyazma were no more than 1,800 killed and wounded, out of 26,500 troops involved. As per other counts, Russian losses were 2,500 and the strength was 27,000. French casualties were 6,000 killed, wounded, and captured out of circa 25,000, of which 22,000 infantry and 3,000 cavalry. Another estimate puts French casualties at 7,000 killed, wounded, and captured, and 3 lost guns, while claiming that most of the 3,000 captured were latecomers.

== Popular culture ==
Leo Tolstoy references the battle in his War and Peace.

== See also ==
- List of battles of the French invasion of Russia

== Citations ==
Preceded by Battle of Chashniki	Napoleonic Wars; Battle of Vyazma	Succeeded by Battle of Smoliani
