= 11th Army Corps (Russian Empire) =

- Active: 1813; 1899–1901; 1908–1917
- Country: Russian Empire
- Allegiance: Imperial Russian Army
- Engagements: World War I

The 11th Army Corps was an Army corps in the Imperial Russian Army

Before the war the unit was stationed with the Kiev Military District.

== Composition (1914) ==
- 11th Infantry Division (Lutsk)
- 32nd Infantry Division (Rovno)
- 11th Cavalry Division (Dubno)
- 11th Mortar Artillery Battalion
- 21st Engineering Battalion

== Commanders ==
- Alexey Ivanovich Shakhovskoy (1876–1879)
- Lieutenant-General Prince Ivan Shakhovskoy, (1888–1892)
- Pavel Grigorievich Dukmasov (1894–1895)
- Dmitrij Petrovich Dohturov (1895–1900)
- Lieutenant General Vladimir Nikolayevich Filipov, (3.03.1900–12.5.1903)
- Lieutenant General Alexandr Yakovlevich Tal (1.07.1903–1905)
- Lieutenant-General (from 6.12.1907 city – General of Infantry) Ivan Aleksandrovich Fullon, (1.06.1905–7.08.1911)
- Lieutenant-General (from 6.12.1912 city – General of Infantry) Nikolai Ivanovich Podvalnyuk, (7.08.1911–13.12.1912)
- General of the cavalry Vladimir Sakharov, (13.12.1913–22.08.1914, 04.09.1915–25.10.1915)
- Lieutenant-General (from 10.04.1916, General of Artillery) Michael A. Barantsev, (03.11.1915–06.04.1917)
- Lieutenant General Konstantin Lukich Gilchevsky, (06.04.1917 -?)

== See also ==
- List of Imperial Russian Army formations and units
