= Pavel Choglokov =

Russian general (1772–1832)

Pavel Nikolaevich Choglokov
- Павел Николаевич Чоглоков (Чеглоков)
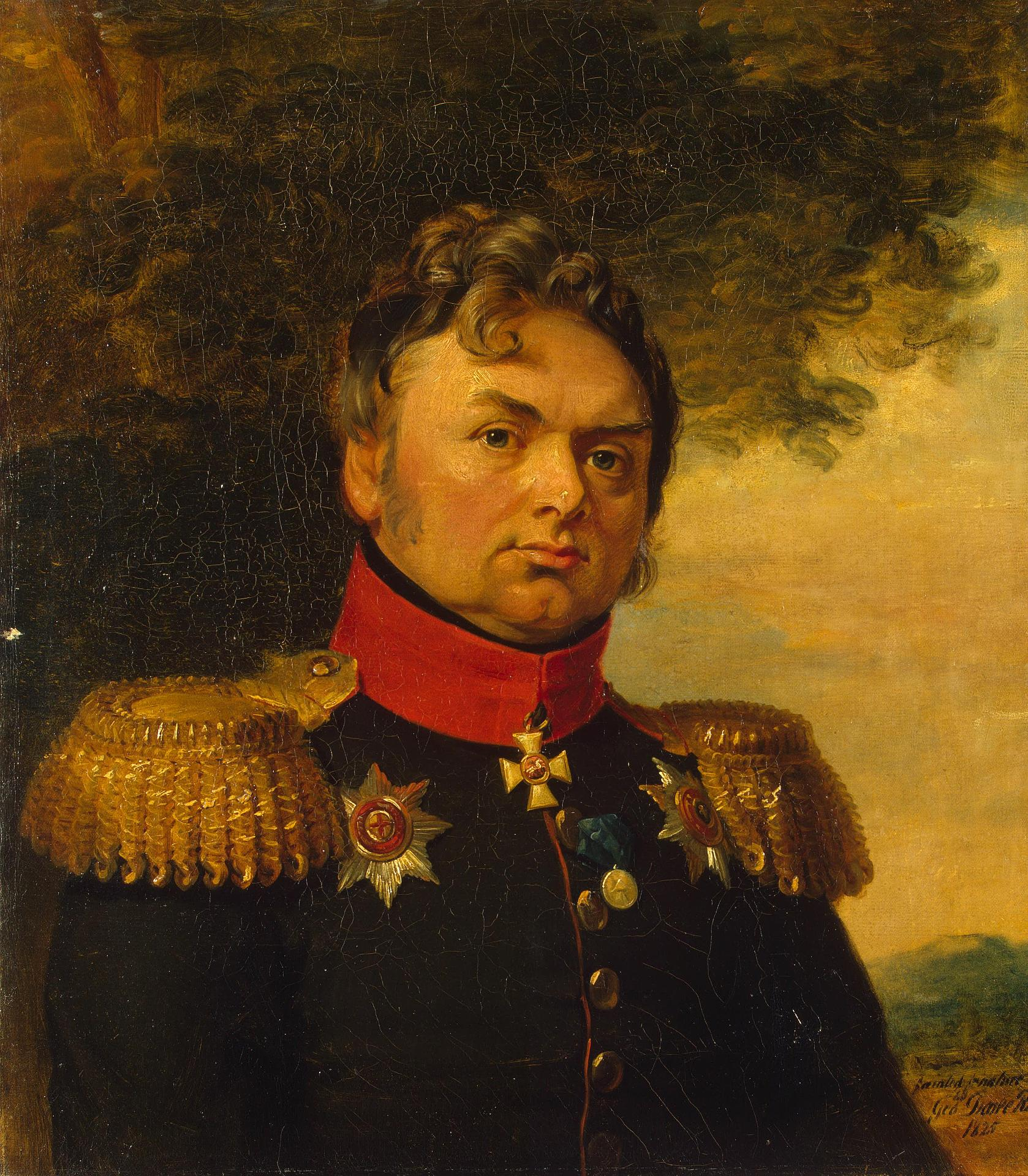
- Portrait (1825) by George Dawe in the Hermitage Museum
- Born: 29 January 1772 (Note: Old Style date: 18 January 1772); St. Petersburg, Saint Petersburg Governorate
- Died: 15 April 1832 (60) (Note: Old Style date: 3 April 1832); St. Petersburg
- Burial place: Koltushi, Shlisselburgsky Uyezd
- Other name: P. Nikolayevich Cheglokov
- Relatives: ru:House of Choglokov
- Military career
- Allegiance: Russia
- Branch: Imperial Russian Army; Imperial Russian Navy
- Service years: 1790–1818
- Rank: Lieutenant general
- Commands: ru:Kexholm Life Guards Regiment ru:3rd Pernau Grenadier Regiment; 11th Infantry Division (1812); 1st Grenadier Division (1813–14)
- Conflicts: Expand list: Russo-Swedish War (1788–1790) in 1790; Kościuszko Uprising (1794); Wars of the Third (in 1805) and the Fourth (in 1807) coalitions; Finnish War; French invasion of Russia (1812); Battle of Ostrovno; Battle of Smolensk; Battle of Borodino; Battle of Vyazma; The Russian army's foreign campaign (1813–1814); Blockade of Glogau; Battle of Lützen; Battle of Bautzen; Battle of Reichenbach; Battle of Leipzig; Battle of Arcis-sur-Aube; Battle of Paris
- Awards: Order of St. George (degrees: 4th [1794], 3rd [Vyazma battle]): Orders of Sts.: • Anna 1st degree; • Vladimir 2nd degree; Golden Weapon for Bravery

Pavel Nikolaevich Choglokov (Note: In this name that follows East Slavic naming customs, the patronymic is Nikolaevich and the family name is Choglokov.) (Russian: Па́вел Никола́евич Чогло́ков; 1772–1832) was a Russian lieutenant general, promoted for the Battle of Leipzig.

== Biography ==
He came from the Russian nobility of the St. Petersburg Governorate, a native of the city of Saint Petersburg, born on 29 January 1772. After completing his studies at the First Cadet Corps, which he graduated from on 19 June 1790, he was accepted into service with the rank of lieutenant in the Pskov Musketeer Regiment. In the same year, during military operations against the Swedes in Prince Charles Nassau-Siegen's Rowing Fleet [ru] and in the army corps of ru:General Fyodor Numsen (until 1794), he proved himself to be a brave and decisive commander. In 1794, he wished to take part in the war with Poland and was awarded the Order of St. George, 4th degree, for his services.

On 30 June 1799, for some omission in his Kexholm Musketeer Regiment during a parade, he was, by order of Paul I of Russia, expelled from service; but already on 16 November of the following year he was again accepted into the same regiment. On 19 November 1800, he was promoted to colonel, and in 1803 he was appointed commander of the Kexholm regiment. In the following years, in 1805 and 1807, he fought against French troops, demonstrating his military talents and leadership qualities, namely at the battles of Heilsberg and Friedland. In 1806, he became the chief of the Pernau Musketeer Regiment.

He particularly distinguished himself during the war with Sweden in 1808–09 – namely at the Siege of Sveaborg and the Battle of Lemo – which led to his promotion to major general on 6 July 1808. In 1812, he commanded a brigade of the 11th Infantry Division and took part in the important battles of Ostrovno and Smolensk. During the Battle of Borodino, he defended the tactically important Raevsky redoubt and soon after took command of the entire 11th Infantry Division (after the death of ru:General Nikolai Bakhmetev).

His outstanding actions were noted during the capture of Vyazma, for which he was awarded the Order of St. George, 3rd degree. From 1813 to 1814, he commanded the 1st Grenadier Division, actively participating in the blockade of Glogau and the battles of Lützen, Bautzen, Reichenbach, Leipzig, and Arcis-sur-Aube. His military career ended in Paris.

On 5 October 1818, he was discharged from military service due to health reasons, while keeping his uniform. His life's journey ended on 15 April 1832 in his homeland, and he was buried near the church in the village of Koltushi, Shlisselburgsky Uyezd, St. Petersburg Governorate.

== Memory ==
A street in the town of Koltushi in the Vsevolozhsky District, Leningrad Oblast, is named in honour of General Choglokov.

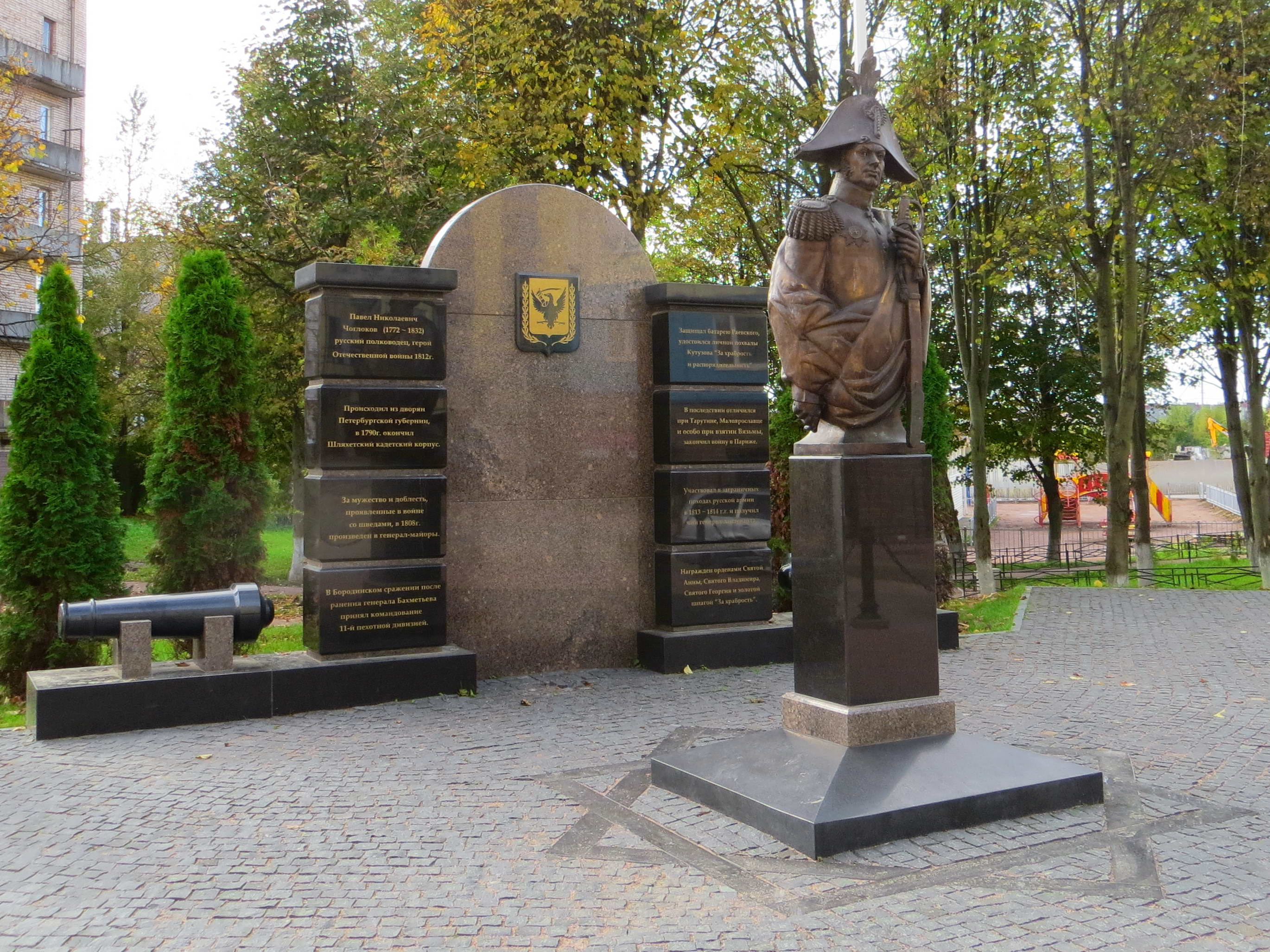
Monument to General P. N. Choglokov in the village of Staraya, Vsevolozhsky District. A short biography is written on the black stone.

== Citations ==
=== Bibliography ===
- Bezotosny, V. [in Russian] (1996). "Чоглоков Павел Николаевич". Словарь русских генералов, участников боевых действий против армии Наполеона Бонапарта в 1812—1815 гг. Российский Архив: История Отечества в свидетельствах и документах XVIII—XX вв.: Альманах. Vol. VII. Moscow: ТриТэ: Рос. Архив. pp. 608–609.
