= Ivan Fullon =

Russian military statesman, adjutant general, infantry general

Ivan Alexandrovich Fullon
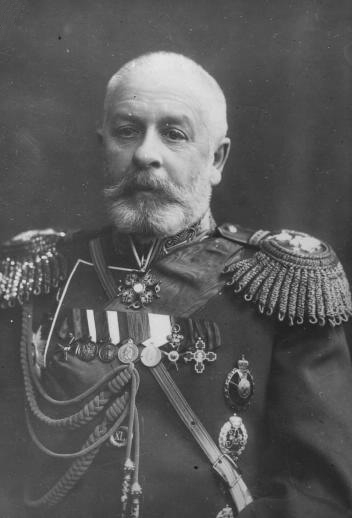
- Born: July 23 (Aug. 4), 1844
- Died: 1920; Petrograd, Russian Soviet Federative Socialist Republic
- Allegiance: Russian Empire
- Service / branch: Imperial Russian Army
- Commands: 39th Infantry Division; 4th Infantry Division; 11th Army Corps
- Battles / wars: January Uprising; Russo-Turkish War

Ivan Alexandrovich Fullon (July 23 (Aug. 4), 1844 – 1920) was an Imperial Russian division and corps commander. He participated in the suppression of the rebellion in Poland and the war against the Ottoman Empire. Before the Russian Revolution of 1905, he provided Georgy Gapon and his Assembly of Russian Factory and Mill Workers of St. Petersburg with comprehensive support but was dismissed after the revolution.

== Awards ==
- Order of Saint Anna, 4th class, 1863
- Order of Saint Vladimir, 4th class, 1880
- Order of Saint Stanislaus (House of Romanov), 2nd class, 1885
- Order of Saint Anna, 2nd class, 1888
- Order of Saint Vladimir, 3rd class, 1893
- Order of Saint Stanislaus (House of Romanov), 1st class, 1896
- Order of Saint Anna, 1st class, 1904
- Order of Saint Vladimir, 2nd class (December 6, 1910)
- Order of the White Eagle (Russian Empire), 1912
- Order of Saint Alexander Nevsky (December 6, 1914)

=== Foreign decorations ===
- Order of the Red Eagle, 3rd class, 1875
- Ludwig Order, 1875
- Order of the Red Eagle, 2nd class, 1890

Preceded by	Commander of the 39th Infantry Division; 1896–1899	Succeeded by
Preceded by	Commander of the 4th Infantry Division; 1899–1900	Succeeded by
Preceded by	Commander of the 11th Army Corps; 1905–1911	Succeeded by

== Sources ==
- Официальный портал администрации Петербурга
- {{#if: 2622

"Ivan Fullon". «Russian army in a Great war» project.
