= Alexander Bozheryanov =

Russian military figure

- Born: 1825; Novgorod Governorate, Russian Empire
- Died: Unknown
- Allegiance: Russian Empire
- Branch: Imperial Russian Army
- Rank: major general
- Commands: 105th Infantry Regiment; 2nd Brigade, 16th Infantry Division; 2nd Brigade, 30th Infantry Division; 4th Infantry Division
- Battles / wars: Russo-Turkish War

Alexander Bozheryanov (1825– ) was an Imperial Russian regiment, brigade and division commander. He fought in the war against the Ottoman Empire. He was a recipient of the Order of Saint Anna.

Preceded by	Commander of the 105th Infantry Regiment; 1864–1873	Succeeded by
Preceded by	Commander of the 2nd Brigade, 16th Infantry Division; 1873-1874	Succeeded by
Preceded by	Commander of the 2nd Brigade, 30th Infantry Division; 1874-1877	Succeeded by
Preceded by	Commander of the 4th Infantry Division; 1885–1886	Succeeded by

== Sources ==
- Старчевский, А.А. Памятник Восточной войны 1877-1878 гг., заключающий в себе в алфавитном порядке биографические очерки всех отличившихся, убитых, раненых и контуженных: генералов, штаб и обер-офицеров, докторов, санитаров, сестер милосердия и отличившихся рядовых стр 29
