= 13th Infantry Division (Russian Empire) =

- 13-я пехотная дивизия
- Active: 1806 – c. 1918
- Country: Russian Empire
- Branch: Russian Imperial Army
- Role: Infantry
- Garrison/HQ: Sevastopol
- Engagements: World War I

The 13th Infantry Division (Russian: 13-я пехотная дивизия, 13-ya Pekhotnaya Diviziya) was an infantry formation of the Russian Imperial Army that existed in various formations from the early 19th century until the end of World War I and the Russian Revolution. The division was based in Sevastopol in the years leading up to 1914. It fought in World War I and was demobilized in 1918.

== Organization ==
The 13th Infantry Division was part of the 7th Army Corps.

- 1st Brigade (HQ Proskurov)
  - 45th Azov Infantry Regiment
  - 46th Dnieper Infantry Regiment
- 2nd Brigade (HQ Kamenets-Podolsk)
  - 47th Ukrainian Infantry Regiment
  - 48th Odessa Infantry Regiment
- 12th Artillery Brigade

== Commanders ==
- 1812-1813: Dmitry Neverovsky
- 1879-1884: Andrey Korf
- May-October 1886: Alexander Konstantinovich Abramov
- 1886-1888: Mikhail Batyanov
- 1892–1895: Dmitrij Petrovich Dohturov
- 1895–1896: Vladimir Nikolayevich Filipov
- 1902-1903: Konstantin Tserpitsky
- 1903-1904: Andrey Selivanov

== Commanders of the 1st Brigade ==
- 1889: Vladimir Nikolayevich Filipov
