= 83rd Infantry Division (Russian Empire) =

- 83-я пехотная дивизия
- Active: 1914–1918
- Country: Russian Empire
- Branch: Russian Imperial Army
- Role: Infantry

The 83rd Infantry Division (Russian: 83-я пехотная дивизия, romanized: 83-ya pekhotnaya diviziya) was an infantry division of the Russian Imperial Army. It was organized at Samara in the Kazan Military District on the basis of hidden hidden frame elements of the 48th Infantry Division.

== Organization ==
- 1st Brigade
  - 329th Buzuluk Infantry Regiment
  - 330th Zlatoustov Infantry Regiment
- 2nd Brigade
  - 331st Orsk Infantry Regiment
  - 332nd Oboyansk Infantry Regiment
- Artillery and Sappers
  - 83rd Field Artillery Brigade
  - 31st Separate Sapper Company

== Commanders ==
- July-November 1914: Konstantin Lukich Gilchevsky
