= Konstantin Gilchevsky =

Russian general (1857–after 1927)

Konstantin Lukich Gilchevsky
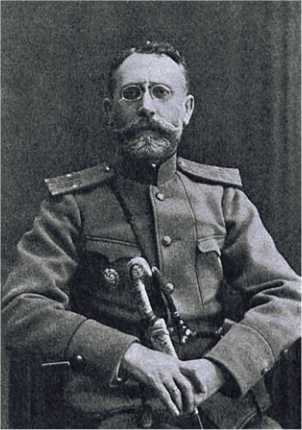
- Major general Gilchevsky
- Born: March 5, 1857
- Died: after 1927
- Allegiance: Russian Empire
- Branch: Imperial Russian Army
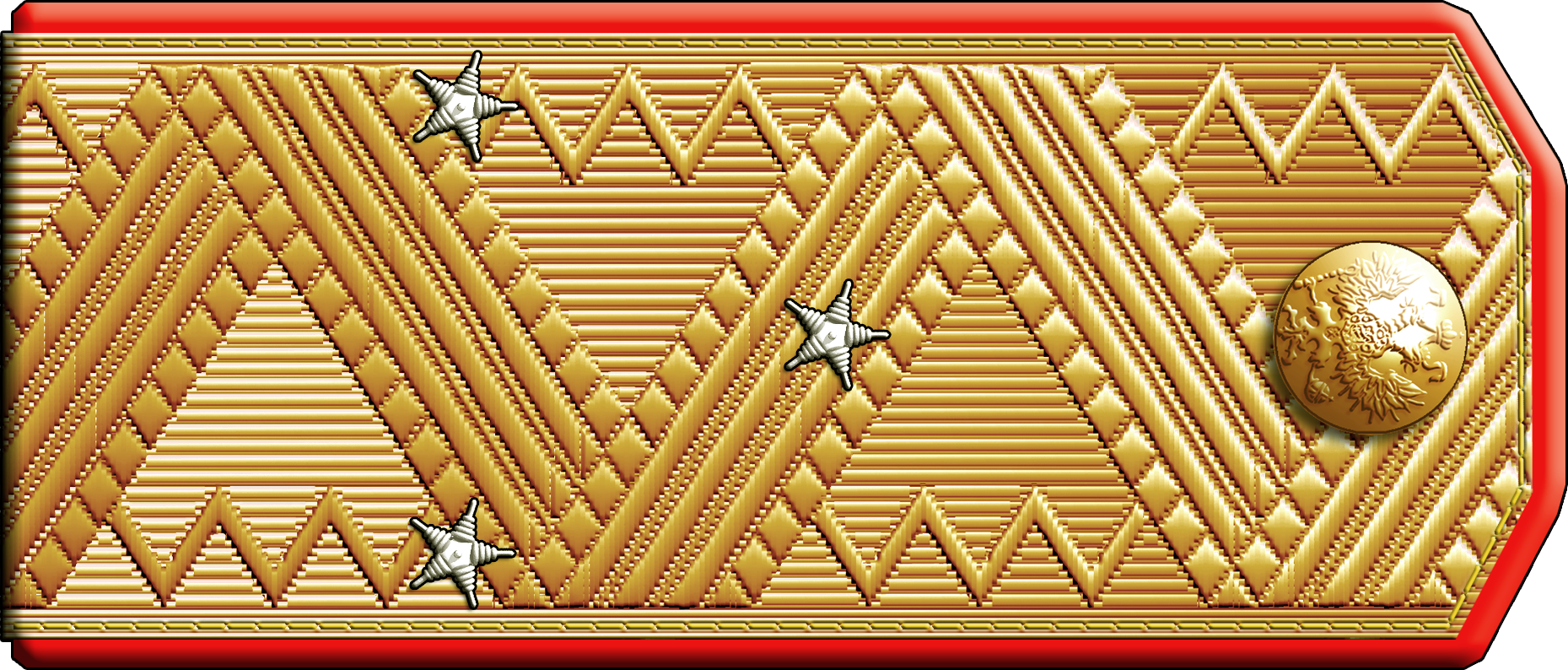
- Rank: Lieutenant general
- Commands: 2nd Brigade, 21st Infantry Division; 1st Brigade, 39th Infantry Division; 83rd Infantry Division; 11th Army
- Conflicts: Russo-Turkish War; World War I

Konstantin Lukich Gilchevsky (March 5, 1857 – after 1927) was an Imperial Russian brigade, division and corps commander. He fought in the war against the Ottoman Empire.

Preceded by	Commander of the 2nd Brigade, 21st Infantry Division; March–September 1908	Succeeded by
Preceded by	Commander of the 1st Brigade, 39th Infantry Division; September 1908–1913	Succeeded by
Preceded by	Commander of the 83rd Infantry Division; July–November 1914	Succeeded by
Preceded by	Commander of the 11th Army Corps; 1917	Succeeded by office abolished
