= Dmitry Petrovich Dokhturov =

Cavalry general of Russian Empire

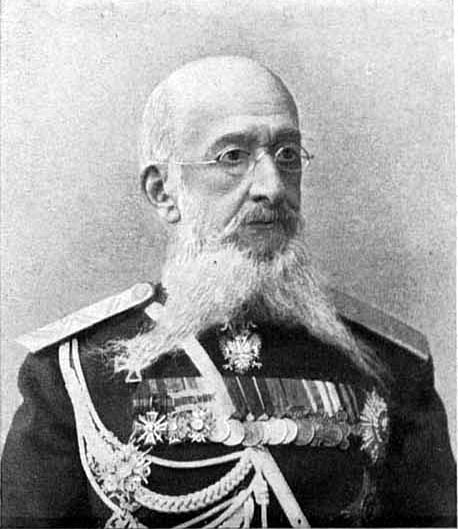
- Born: 25 May 1838; Tula Governorate, Russian Empire
- Died: 25 March 1905 (aged 66)
- Allegiance: Russian Empire
- Branch: (Russian Empire) Imperial Russian Army
- Service years: 1855–1905
- Rank: General of the cavalry
- Commands: 2nd Brigade, 33rd Infantry Division; 2nd Brigade, 16th Infantry Division; 12th Infantry Division; 13th Infantry Division; 11th Army Corps
- Conflicts: Caucasian War; Russo-Turkish War

Dmitry Petrovich Dokhturov (25 May 1838 – 25 March 1905) was an Imperial Russian brigade, division and corps commander. He fought in the wars in the Caucasus and against the Ottoman Empire.

== Ranks ==
- Poruchik (23 April 1859)
- Stabskapitän (12 January 1861)
- Captain (28 November 1861)
- Rittmeister (17 April 1863)
- Podpolkovnik (lieutenant colonel) (13 September 1864)
- Polkovnik (colonel) (27 March 1866)
- Major general (14 September 1877)
- Lieutenant general (30 August 1886)
- General of the cavalry (6 December 1898)

== Awards ==
- Order of Saint Stanislaus (House of Romanov), 3rd class, 1861
- Order of Saint Vladimir, 4th class, 1863
- Order of Saint Stanislaus (House of Romanov), 2nd class, 1868
- Order of Saint Anna, 2nd class, 1871
- Order of Saint Vladimir, 3rd class, 1874
- Gold Sword for Bravery, 1877
- Order of Saint Stanislaus (House of Romanov), 1st class, 1879
- Order of Saint Anna, 1st class, 1882
- Order of Saint Vladimir, 2nd class, 1885
- Order of the White Eagle, 1890
- Order of Saint Alexander Nevsky, 1896

Preceded by	Commander of the 2nd Brigade, 33rd Infantry Division; 1878	Succeeded by
Preceded by	Commander of the 2nd Brigade, 16th Infantry Division; 1878	Succeeded by
Preceded by	Commander of the 12th Infantry Division; 1886–1892	Succeeded by
Preceded by	Commander of the 13th Infantry Division; 1892–1895	Succeeded by Vladimir Nikolayevich Filipov
Preceded by Pavel Grigorievich Dukmasov	Commander of the 11th Army Corps; 1895–1900	Succeeded by Vladimir Nikolayevich Filipov
