= 4th Cavalry Division (Russian Empire) =

- 4-я кавалерийская дивизия
- Active: 1875–1918
- Country: Russian Empire
- Branch: Russian Imperial Army
- Role: Cavalry
- Engagements: World War I; Battle of Tannenberg

The 4th Cavalry Division (Russian: 4-я кавалерийская дивизия, 4-ya Kavaleriiskaya Diviziya) was a cavalry formation of the Russian Imperial Army.

== Organization ==
- 1st Cavalry Brigade
  - 4th Regiment of Dragoons
  - 4th Uhlan Regiment
- 2nd Cavalry Brigade
  - 4th Regiment of Hussars
  - 4th Regiment of Cossacks
- 4th Horse Artillery Division

== Commanders ==
- 07.27.1875 - хх.хх.1877 - Lieutenant General Krylov, Evgeny Timofeevich
- 09/15/1877 - хх.хх.1878 - major general (from 16.04.1878 lieutenant general) Arnoldi, Alexander Ivanovich
- хх.хх.1878 - after 06/01/1883 - Lieutenant General Pope Afanasopulo, Georgy Ilyich
- 06/26/1883 - 01/07/1892 - major general (from 30.08.1886 lieutenant general) Strukov, Alexander Petrovich
- 01/22/1892 - 08/03/1897 - major general (from 30/30/1894 lieutenant general) Timiryazev, Nikolai Arkadyevich
- 09/12/1897 - 03/02/1899 - Major General Charkovsky, Pyotr Vladimirovich
- 1899–1901: Georgi Skalon
- 1901–1903: Vladimir Viktorovich Sakharov
- 12.24.1903 - 11.21.1906 - Lieutenant General von Bader, Edmund Karlovich
- 12/06/1906 - 05/01/1910 - Lieutenant General Garnak, Alexander Leontyevich
- 05/01/1910 - 06/19/1912 - Lieutenant General Vannovsky, Boris Petrovich
- 06/22/1912 - 10/15/1914 - Lieutenant General Tolpygo, Anton Alexandrovich
- 10/15/1914 - 04/18/1917 - Lieutenant General Vannovsky, Boris Petrovich (second time)
- 04/19/1917 - 08/21/1917 - Major General Sveshnikov, Nikolai Lvovich
- 08.21.1917 - 12.30.1917 - Major General Fedorov, Alexander Ippolitovich

== Chiefs of Staff ==
- 07.26.1882 - 12.19.1884 - Colonel V.I. Pnevsky
- 01/07/1885 - 04/28/1888 - Colonel von Essen, Pavel Emelyanovich
- 05/28/1888 - 03/03/1894 - Colonel von Essen, Pavel Emelyanovich (second)
- 03/06/1894 - 10/06/1894 - Colonel Karandeyev, Valerian Alexandrovich
- 06/21/1894 - 12/02/1896 - Colonel Rutkovsky, Pyotr Konstantinovich
- 1896–1901: Sergei Scheidemann
- 05/27/1901 - 06/09/1903 - Colonel Zhegachev, Boris Konstantinovich
- 06/14/1903 - 10/24/1910 - lieutenant colonel (colonel from December 6, 1903) Martynov, Anatoly Ivanovich
- 12/24/1910 - 06/28/1912 - Colonel Kanshin, Pyotr Pavlovich
- 07.17.1912 - 04.16.1914 - Colonel Makhov, Mikhail Mikhailovich
- 04/21/1914 - 01/21/1915 - Colonel Linitsky, Alexander Ivanovich
- 02/20/1915 - 01/05/1916 - and. D. Lieutenant Colonel Grebenshchikov, Sergey Yakovlevich
- 01/19/1916 - 07/12/1916 - Colonel Kulzhinsky, Sergey Nikolaevich
- 08/03/1916 - 10/11/1917 - lieutenant colonel (Colonel from 08/15/1916) Leontiev, Mikhail Evgenievich

== Commanders of the 1st Brigade ==
- xx.xxx.1875 - 04.10.1877 - Major General Leontyev, Vladimir Nikolaevich
- 10.17.1877 - 11.23.1886 - Major General Baron Meyendorf, Nikolai Egorovich
- 1886 - ??. ??. 1889 - Major General of the Suite Parfyonov, Alexander Demidovich
- 05/17/1889 - after 01/01/1891 - Major General Aderkas, Vladimir Vladimirovich
- 02.17.1891-27.01.1895 - Major General A.M. Pilsudsky
- 03.03.1895 - 01.30.1902 - Major General von Bader, Edmund Karlovich
- 03/10/1902 - 03/03/1904 - Major General von Kruzenshtern, Nikolai Fedorovich
- 02/04/1904 - 12/02/1904 - Major General Prince Myshetsky, Pyotr Nikolaevich
- 12/09/1904 - 12/04/1907 - Major General Savenkov, Fedor Andreevich
- 12/06/1907 - 12/31/1913 - Major General Krasovsky, Bronislav Ivanovich
- 12/31/1913 - after 07/10/1916 - Major General Kayander, Evgeny Fedorovich

== Commanders of the 2nd Brigade ==
- хх.хх.1875 - after 01/01/1880 - Major General Makarov, Pavel Pavlovich
- 05/29/1880 - 07/14/1883 - Major General Rebinder, Alexander Maximovich
- 07.14.1883 - 08.10.1885 - Major General Khrushchev, Pyotr Nikolaevich
- 08/10/1885 - 07/26/1895 - Major General Baronch, Alexander Antonovich
- 07.31.1895-19.08.1896 - Major General A.A. Benckendorf
- 11.13.1896 - 05.29.1897 - Major General Dubensky, Alexander Nikolaevich
- 06/12/1897 - 04/11/1905 - Major General Gulkovsky, Nikolai Nikolaevich
- 05/20/1905 - 04/20/1906 - Major General Maynard, Walter Walterovich
- 04/20/1906 - 10/03/1906 - Major General Vasily Gurko
- 10/03/1906 - 07/04/1907 - Major General Medvedev, Nikolai Alexandrovich
- 12/06/1907 - 05/29/1910 - Major General Tolpygo, Anton Alexandrovich
- 05/29/1910 - 08/01/1913 - Major General Falkovsky, Ivan Amvrosievich
- 08/30/1913 - 06/06/1915 - Major General Martynov, Anatoly Ivanovich
- 06/06/1915 - 04/14/1917 - Major General Budberg, Anatoly Alexandrovich
- 04/14/1917 - 06/27/1917 - Colonel Pulevich, Veniamin Mikhailovich
- 08/22/1917 - Major General von Krug, Victor Platonovich

== Commanders of the Horse Artillery Division ==
- 05/06/1895-30.09.1898 - Colonel Shepelev-Voronovich
- 10.22.1898-21.11.1901 - Colonel L.N. Sukhin
- 12.24.1901-18.05.1905 - Colonel E. G. Przhedpelsky
- 06/27/1905 - 07/03/1907 - Colonel von Gillenschmidt, Alexander Fedorovich
- 07/18/1907 - 05/26/1908 - Colonel Kilhen, Sergey Sergeevich
- 06/18/1908 - 01/13/1914 - Colonel Zakharchenko, Ivan Alexandrovich
- 01/13/1914 - 02/22/1916 - Colonel Latukhin, Vladimir Koronatovich
- 05/04/1916 - 02.24.1917 - Colonel Levitsky, Alexander Alexandrovich
- 04/28/1917 - Colonel Passek, Vasily Vasilyevich
