= Pavel Grigorievich Dukmasov =

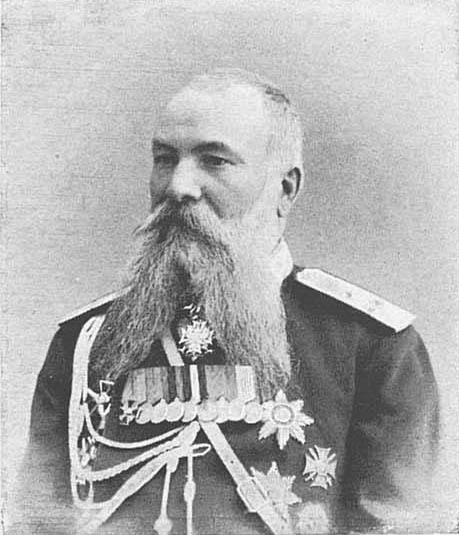
- Born: 6 November 1838
- Died: 15 February 1911 (aged 72)
- Allegiance: Russian Empire
- Service / branch: Imperial Russian Army
- Commands: 11th Army Corps; 7th Army Corps
- Battles / wars: Caucasian War; Russo-Turkish War

Pavel Grigorievich Dukmasov (6 November 1838 – 15 February 1911) was an Imperial Russian corps commander. He participated in the wars in the Caucasus and against the Ottoman Empire. He was promoted to Polkovnik (colonel) on 28 October 1866, and major general on 8 September 1874.

== Awards ==
- Order of Saint Stanislaus (House of Romanov), 2nd class
- Order of Saint Vladimir, 4th class, 1878
- Order of Saint Stanislaus (House of Romanov), 1st class, 1879
- Order of Saint Anna, 1st class, 1882
- Order of Saint Vladimir, 2nd class, 1885
- Order of Saint Vladimir, 1st class, 1906

Preceded by	Commander of the 11th Army Corps; 1894–1895	Succeeded by Dmitrij Petrovich Dohturov
Preceded by	Commander of the 7th Army Corps; 1895–1900	Succeeded by
