= 34th Infantry Division (Russian Empire) =

- 34-я пехотная дивизия
- Active: 1914–1918
- Country: Russian Empire
- Branch: Russian Imperial Army
- Role: Infantry

The 34th Infantry Division (Russian: 34-я пехо́тная диви́зия, 34-ya Pekhotnaya Diviziya) was an infantry formation of the Russian Imperial Army.

== Organization ==
The 13th Infantry Division was part of the 7th Army Corps.

- 1st Brigade
  - 133rd Infantry Regiment
  - 134th Infantry Regiment
- 2nd Brigade
  - 135th Infantry Regiment
  - 136th Infantry Regiment
- 34th Artillery Brigade

== Commanders of the 1st Brigade ==
- 1905-1909 - Major general Nikita Batashev

== Commanders of the 2nd Brigade ==
- 1905 - Major general Vasily Zholtanovsky
- 1909 - Major general Alexander Zhdanko
