= Vladimir Filipov =

Imperial Russian army general

Vladimir Nikolayevich Filipov
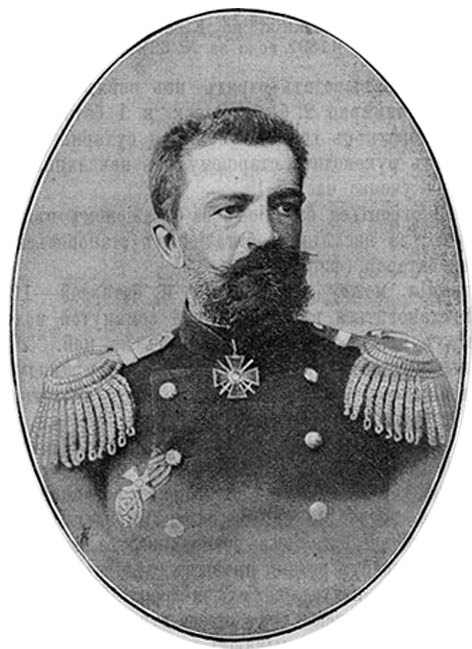
- Lieutenant general Filipov
- Born: 2 November 1838
- Died: 12 May 1903 (aged 64); Odessa, Russian Empire
- Military career
- Allegiance: Russian Empire
- Branch: (Russian Empire) Imperial Russian Army
- Commands: 1st Brigade, 13th Infantry Division; 13th Infantry Division; 15th Infantry Division; 11th Army Corps
- Conflicts: January Uprising; Russo-Turkish War; Boxer Rebellion

Vladimir Nikolayevich Filipov (2 November 1838 – 12 May 1903) was an Imperial Russian lieutenant general, brigade, division and corps commander. He took part in the suppression of the uprising in Poland and in the war against the Ottoman Empire. He died in what is now Ukraine.

In 1896, he was commander of the 13th Division, when he met with French military attaché L. E. Moulin at Odessa. Moulin noted he was coldly received and believed this to be because Filipov suspected France had ambitions in the Ottoman Empire.

== Awards ==
- Order of Saint Stanislaus (House of Romanov), 3rd class, 1863
- Order of Saint Anna, 3rd class, 1864
- Order of Saint Stanislaus (House of Romanov), 2nd class, 1869
- Order of Saint Anna, 2nd class, 1873
- Order of Saint George, 4th degree, 1877
- Gold Sword for Bravery, 1878
- Order of Saint Vladimir, 3rd class, 1878
- Order of Saint Stanislaus (House of Romanov), 1st class, 1887
- Order of Saint Anna, 1st class, 1890
- Order of Saint Vladimir, 2nd class, 1901

== Works ==
- A military review of the Tiflis governorate and zakatala district. — Spb., 1872.
- Military-topographical and strategic review of Northeast Asian provinces of Turkey. — Spb., 1874.
- Asian military review of Turkey. — Spb., 1881.
- Military review of the Thracian peninsula. — Spb., 1884.
- Strategic description of the Bosphorus. — Spb., 1886.
- Topographical overview of the Tiflis governorate and zakatala district. -Tiflis, 1897. (2 Ed. 1872 year books)

Preceded by	Commander of the 1st Brigade, 13th Infantry Division; 1889	Succeeded by
Preceded by Dmitrij Petrovich Dohturov	Commander of the 13th Infantry Division; 1895–1896	Succeeded by
Preceded by	Commander of the 15th Infantry Division; 1896–1900	Succeeded by
Preceded by Dmitrij Petrovich Dohturov	Commander of the 11th Army Corps; 1900–1903	Succeeded by
