= 39th Infantry Division (Russian Empire) =

- 39-я пехотная дивизия
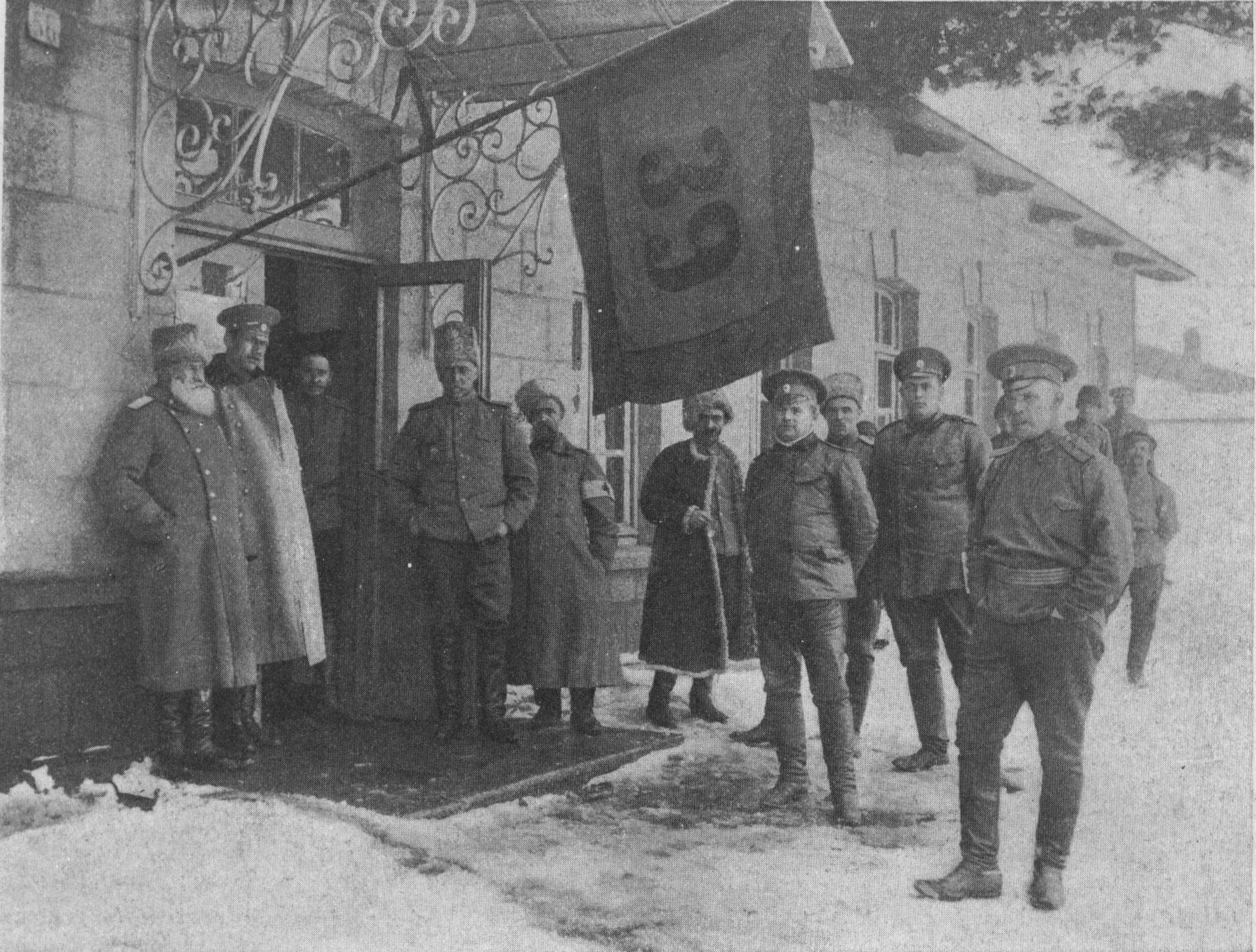
- Russian general De-Vitt with his staff of 39th infantry division.
- Active: 1914–1918
- Country: Russian Empire
- Branch: Russian Imperial Army
- Role: Infantry

The 39th Infantry Division (Russian: 39-я пехо́тная диви́зия, 39-ya Pekhotnaya Diviziya) was an infantry formation of the Russian Imperial Army.

== Organization ==
- 1st Brigade
  - 153rd Infantry Regiment
  - 154th Infantry Regiment
- 2nd Brigade
  - 155th Infantry Regiment
  - 156th Infantry Regiment
- 39th Artillery Brigade

== Commanders ==
- 1896-1899: Ivan Fullon

== Chiefs of Staff ==
- 1890-1891: Alexander Iosafovich Ievreinov

== Commanders of the 1st Brigade ==
- September 1908-1913: Konstantin Lukich Gilchevsky
