= 7th Army Corps (Russian Empire) =

- Active: 1877-1918
- Country: Russian Empire; Russian Republic
- Branch: (Russian Empire) Imperial Russian Army
- Size: ~20,000
- HQ: Simferopol
- Engagements: Russo-Turkish War (1877–78); World War I

The 7th Army Corps was an Army corps in the Imperial Russian Army.

== Composition ==
- 13th Infantry Division
- 34th Infantry Division
- 7th Don Cossack Host Ataman Denisov Regiment
- 7th Howitzer Artillery Battalion
- 12th Sapper Battalion

== Part of ==
- 8th Army: 1914
- 3rd Army: 1914
- 8th Army: 1915
- 11th Army: 1915-1916
- 4th Army: 1916-1917
- 6th Army: 1917

== Commanders ==
- 1895-1900: Pavel Grigorievich Dukmasov
- 1905: Lieutenant general baron Alexander Meller-Zakomelsky
- 1909: General of the Cavalry Vladimir Viktorovich Sakharov
- 1912-1916: Eduard Ekk
