= Alexandr Yakovlevich Tal =

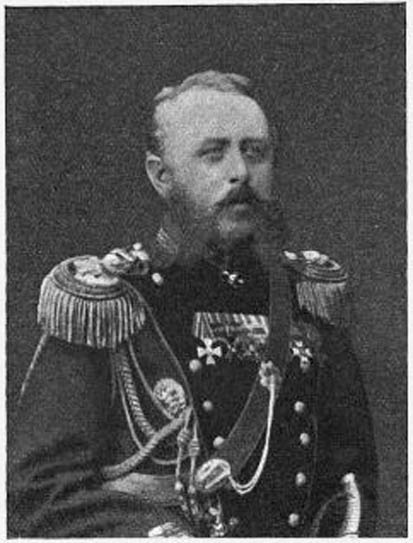
- Born: July 18, 1840
- Died: October 16, 1911 (aged 71); Tsarskoye Selo, Saint Petersburg, Russian Empire
- Military career
- Allegiance: Russian Empire
- Branch: Imperial Russian Army
- Commands: 11th Army Corps
- Conflicts: January Uprising; Russo-Turkish War

Alexandr Yakovlevich Tal (July 18, 1840 – October 16, 1911) was an Imperial Russian corps commander. He took part in the suppression of the uprising in Poland and the war against the Ottoman Empire. He died in what is now Pushkin, Saint Petersburg.

Tal published, in 1904, an account of the actions of the 2nd His Imperial Highness General Feldzeugmeister Battery of the Guards Horse Artillery Brigade during the Russo-Turkish War (1877–1878).

Preceded by	Commander of the 11th Army Corps; 1903–1905	Succeeded by
