= 16th Infantry Division (Russian Empire) =

- 16-я пехотная дивизия
- Active: 1914–1918
- Country: Russian Empire
- Branch: Russian Imperial Army
- Role: Infantry

The 16th Infantry Division (Russian: 16-я пехо́тная диви́зия, 16-ya Pekhotnaya Diviziya) was an infantry formation of the Russian Imperial Army.

== Organization ==
- 1st Brigade
  - 61st Infantry Regiment
  - 62nd Infantry Regiment
- 2nd Brigade
  - 63rd Infantry Regiment
  - 64th Infantry Regiment
- 16th Artillery Brigade

== Commanders (Division Chiefs) ==
- 1905-1909 - Lieutenant general Ivan Bogaevsky

== Commanders of the 1st Brigade ==
- 1905 - Major general Alexander Resin
- 1909 - Major general Georgy Eihe

== Commanders of the 2nd Brigade ==
- 1873-1874 - Alexander Bozheryanov
- 02/03/1874 - 02/26/1874 - Major General Kutnevich, Boris Gerasimovich
- 02/26/1874 - after 11/01/1877 - Major General Grenquist, Fyodor Ivanovich
  - on 09.16.1877 - Colonel Tomilovsky, Pyotr Petrovich (temporarily, due to the temporary command of the entire division by F.I. Grenquist)
  - 01.01.1878 - Colonel Panyutin, Vsevolod Fedorovich (temporarily)
- 1878: Dmitrij Petrovich Dohturov
- хх.хх.1878 - 09/28/1884 - Major General Wenzel, Eduard Adolfovich
- 10/07/1884 - 11/26/1884 - Major General Dmitry Dmitrievich Kozhukhov
- 11/25/1884 - 04/17/1889 - Major General Osten-Drizen, Nikolai Fedorovich
- 04.24.1889 - 11.18.1894 - Major General Sirotsynsky, Vladimir Mironovich
- 08.12.1894 - 30.08.1902 - Major General Zetterman, Otton Lorenzovich
- 09.16.1902 - 02.05.1904 - Major General Bykov, Alexander Nikolaevich
- February 19, 1904 - October 22, 1904 - Major General Pyotr Baluyev
- 11/27/1904 - 03/06/1911 - Major General Esimontovsky, Vasily Fedorovich
- 03/06/1911 - 10/11/1913 - Major General Yakubovsky, Joseph Stepanovich
- 10/29/1913 - 12/31/1913 - Major General Kozlov, Ivan Ivanovich
- 01/14/1914 - 10/17/1915 - Major General Bauder, Viktor Fedorovich
- 10/17/1915 - 04/16/1917 - Major General Belyavsky, Alexey Petrovich
- 04/20/1917 - 05/26/1917 - Commander Colonel Sulimov, Ilya Ilyich
- 05/26/1917 - 10/07/1917 - Major General Klimenko, Viktor Ivanovich

== Artillery Brigade Commanders ==
- 1905-1907: Nikolai Ilyich Bulatov
