= Konstantin Tserpitsky =

Russian commander, lieutenant general

Konstantin V. Tserpitsky
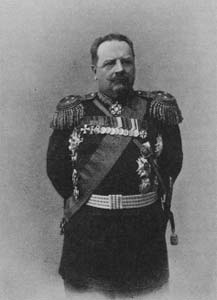
- Born: December 11, 1849
- Died: November 14, 1905 (aged 55)
- Allegiance: Russian Empire
- Branch: Imperial Russian Army
- Commands: 13th Infantry Division (Russian Empire); 10th Army Corps (Russian Empire)
- Conflicts: Boxer Rebellion; Battle of Beitang; Russo-Japanese War; Battle of Liaoyang; Battle of Sandepu; Battle of Mukden

Konstantin Vikentyevich Tserpitsky (December 11, 1849 – November 14, 1905) was a Russian commander, lieutenant general, participant in the campaigns of 1873, 1875–1876, 1878 and 1880 in Turkestan, the Chinese campaign of 1900–1901 and the Russo-Japanese War of 1904–1905. He distinguished himself during the suppression of the Boxer Uprising (1900–1901). Brother of General Tserpitsky V.V., who died during the defense of Port Arthur.

== Biography ==
Tserpitsky came from hereditary noblemen of the Grodno Governorate.

He graduated from the 2nd St. Petersburg Military Gymnasium (1865) and the 1st Pavlovsk Military School (1867).

He participated in campaigns in Turkestan in 1873, 1875–1876, 1878 and 1880.

In 1875 – captain of the 3rd West Siberian Line Battalion.

From 1875 – major, from 1879 – lieutenant colonel, from 1882 – colonel.

In the years 1887–1892 – Commander of the 85th Vyborg Infantry Regiment.

From 1892 – commander of the 37th Yekaterinburg Infantry Regiment.

From 1895 – major general, from 1900 – lieutenant general.

Member of the Chinese campaign. After the capture of Beijing in August 1900 by European allied forces, General Tserpitsky, as part of General Stackelberg, took part in the siege of the Beitan fortress (12 kilometers from Tongu) at the head of one of the two assault columns. On September 7, 1900, a detachment led by Tserpitsky occupied the railway station. Beitan station, which served as the beginning of a general assault, which ended on the same day with the capture of all the forts of the fortress. On September 11, Tserpitsky again set off on a campaign, towards Lutai, with the goal of occupying the Chinese railway Tonka-Shanghai-Huan-Yingkou. Occupying Tanshan railway station, on September 14, Tserpitsky received a letter from the commandant of the Shanghai-Guan fortress in which he agreed to all the conditions for the surrender of the fortress to the Russians. On September 15, Tserpitsky's detachment set off to occupy Shanghaihauan on two trains. On September 19, 1900, during the final operations to destroy small detachments, General Tserpitsky captured Shanghai Shanghai on the border with Manchuria.

On October 26, 1900, Major General Tserpitsky was appointed head of the South Manchurian detachment.

In late summer and early fall of 1901, Russian troops organized and conducted operations in northern Manchuria to capture the last remaining leaders of the hunhuz movement. Back in May, the general leadership of these operations was assigned to the commander of the 2nd Siberian Corps, Lieutenant General A.V. Kaulbars, with the subordination of Lieutenant General Tserpitsky and the troops of the South Manchurian Detachment to him during the hostilities.

Even before these operations against the leaders of the Chinese rebel movement, General Tserpitsky, several private operations were carried out against the Hunhuz in southern Manchuria. The result of these actions was the capture of the Chinese general Sheu and the surrender of yet another leader of the Hunhus Fulango.

In August 1901, Lieutenant General Tserpitsky surrendered the command of the South Manchurian detachment to Major General Fleischer, who commanded him at the beginning of the campaign, when attacking Khaichen.

From February 20, 1902 to December 11, 1903 – commander of the 13th Infantry Division.

In 1904 – commander of the 1st Turkestan Army Corps (from December 11, 1903 to November 14, 1904).

From November 1904 to September 1905 – commander of the 10th Army Corps, which took part in the battles near Liaoyang and Mukden during the Russo-Japanese War.

During the battle of Mukden, on February 23, 1905, against the general background of a situation close to critical, the detachments of generals Tserpitsky and Gerngross launched a counterattack on the 3rd Japanese army near Tzenitun (Thetenun) and temporarily stopped the advance of the enemy. Even later, an officer arrives from General Tserpitsky and talks about the attack of some village, whose name I do not remember. The corps commander, General Tserpitsky, personally led the Buzuluk regiment to attack. Without a shot he went up to a fortified enemy position. Instantly, the Japanese were kicked out of the trenches and thrown back.

    - [1]

Died in Cannes from wounds received near Mukden. He was buried in the Gran Jas cemetery.

== Awards ==
- Order of St. George 4th degree (December 29, 1876) "In retribution for the distinction shown in the battle against the Kokans during the siege of the Namangan Citadel, October 24, 1875, where, having volunteered to hunters, with the team entrusted to him, he took until 9- these enemy blockages. "
- Golden weapon (1901)
- Order of St. George 3rd degree (October 13, 1905) "For the difference in cases against the Japanese."
- Order of the Double Dragon (04/23/1902) "For contribution to the restoration of calm in Manchuria after the defeat of the Boxer Uprising of 1898-1901"

== Literature ==
- Makovkin A.E. 1st Nerchinsk Regiment of the Transbaikal Cossack Army. 1898-1906 Historical background. - SPb., 1907.

== Sources ==
- Золотое оружие К. В. Церпицкого

Preceded by	Commander of the 10th Army Corps; 1904-1905	Succeeded by
