= 11th Cavalry Division (Russian Empire) =

- 11-я кавалерийская дивизия
- Active: 1914–1918
- Country: Russian Empire
- Branch: Russian Imperial Army
- Role: Cavalry
- Engagements: World War I; Brusilov Offensive; Gorlice–Tarnów Offensive

The 11th Cavalry Division (Russian: 11-я кавалерийская дивизия, 11-ya Kavaleriiskaya Diviziya) was a cavalry formation of the Russian Imperial Army.

== Organization ==
- 1st Cavalry Brigade
  - 11th Regiment of Dragoons
  - 11th Uhlan Regiment
- 2nd Cavalry Brigade
  - 11th Regiment of Hussars
- 11th Horse Artillery Division
  - 11th Regiment of Cossacks

== Chief of Staff ==
- 1887-1891: Nikolai Ruzsky
- September 16-November 25, 1899: Vladislav Klembovsky
