= Second Moscow Cadet Corps =

Coordinates: 55.6703°N 37.5229°E

- Active: 1719-1918 re-activated in 1999
- Allegiance: Russian Empire; Russian Federation
- Branch: Imperial Russian Army; EMERCOM
- Type: Military school

The Nicholas I Second Moscow Emperor Cadet Corps (Russian: Московский 2-й кадетский корпус) is a military educational institution in Russia.

It was opened in December 1849 for 400 students from the poorest nobility. It consisted of four companies and was located together with the First Moscow Cadet Corps in the Golovinsky Palace, in its other half. It was revived in 1999 as a state educational institution, cadet boarding school No. 69 "Second Moscow Cadet Corps" (EMERCOM). One of the seven cadet corps in pre-revolutionary Russia (along with Emperor Alexander II, 2nd Emperor Peter the Great, 1st Moscow Empress Catherine II, 3rd Moscow Emperor Alexander II, Omsk (Siberian) Emperor Alexander I and Don Emperor Alexander III), which were granted the honorary patronage of the late Russian emperors.

== History ==
At the end of 1837, a regulation was approved on the opening in Moscow, along with the First Moscow Cadet Corps, of another cadet corps, later called the Second Moscow Cadet Corps. For various reasons, the opening of the Second Moscow Cadet Corps was delayed until the end of 1849.

Donations were made for the education of children in the corps in 1844, 1847 and 1850 - a capital of 65,000 silver rubles was formed, intended for the maintenance of one pupil from the poorest nobles from each district of the Moscow Governorate.

The opening of the corps took place on December 6, 1849. Colonel Sergei Petrovich Ozerov was appointed director.

In October 1849, entrance examinations and medical selection of children began entering the corps at the expense of the nobility of Moscow and seven provinces assigned to the Second Moscow Cadet Corps (Vologda, Yaroslavl, Kostroma, Vladimir, Nizhny Novgorod, Kazan, Yekaterinoslav). By the end of January 1850, the corps already had 54 students, by the end of March - 74, by the end of the school year - 81. On August 6, 1850, 17 students from the Razumovsky juvenile department were transferred to the 2nd Moscow Corps - they were assigned to the 2nd musketeer company; and 200 students from the Alexandria Orphanage - from them a grenadier and 1st musketeer companies were formed, with 100 people in each. Thus, three combat companies were formed in the corps, which made up a battalion. All transferred students were assigned to the 1st, 2nd and 3rd general classes.

In July 1854, the first graduation of officers took place from the 2nd special class, in 1855 - from the 3rd special class. All cadets of the 3rd special class who completed the course in 1st category received the ranks of ensign of the guard, second lieutenant of artillery or lieutenant of infantry. Cadets who successfully completed the course of the 2nd special class were released into the artillery and infantry, depending on the success achieved.

In 1856, the name of the grenadier and musketeer companies was abolished - the companies became numbered. Since 1857, external admission to the corps was allowed.

During the period from 1854 to 1863, 10 official graduations were made from the corps. In the summer of 1863, the last battalion-sized corps went to camp in the village of Kolomenskoye, and on August 9, the last imperial review took place there. On the day of the imperial review, the last production of 32 cadets as officers took place in the 2nd Moscow Cadet Corps. Following this, all the students of the special classes were partially transferred to the Mikhailovskoye Artillery (10 people), and the majority (47 people) to the newly opened Alexandrovskoye Military School in Moscow, located in the building of the abolished Alexandria Orphan Cadet Corps.

=== Re-establishment ===
On June 8, 1999, the year of the 150th anniversary of the opening of the Second Moscow Cadet Corps, in Moscow, on the basis of the Discovery school (boarding school No. 69) for orphans, at 97-A Leninsky Avenue, the State Educational Institution Cadet Boarding School No. 69 Second Moscow Cadet Corps under the Ministry of Emergency Situations was opened.

In 2004, the Second Moscow Cadet Corps graduated its first class. On May 13, 2005, the Second Moscow Cadet Corps Museum was opened in the cadet corps. The widow of the old cadet Alexei Borisovich Iordan, Maria Alexandrovna, and her daughter were present at the opening.

Graduates of the corps successfully study at the Civil Defense Academy of the Ministry of Emergency Situations, the Academy of the State Fire Service of the Ministry of Emergency Situations of Russia, the University of the Ministry of Internal Affairs, the Border School of the FSB, as well as at civilian universities.
