= 11th Infantry Division (Russian Empire) =

- 11-я пехотная дивизия
- Active: 1806 – c. 1918
- Country: Russian Empire
- Branch: Russian Imperial Army
- Role: Infantry
- Garrison/HQ: Lutsk
- Engagements: French invasion of Russia; War of the Sixth Coalition; Crimean War; Russo-Turkish War of 1877-1878; World War I

The 11th Infantry Division (Russian: 11-я пехотная дивизия, 11-ya Pekhotnaya Diviziya) was an infantry formation of the Russian Imperial Army that existed in various formations from the early 19th century until the end of World War I and the Russian Revolution. The division was based in Lutsk in the years leading up to 1914. It fought in World War I and was demobilized in 1918.

== History ==
The division was formed on 24 July 1806 as the 18th Infantry Division, one of four new divisions formed in an expansion of the army to control new regiments. It included the Tambov, Yakutsk, Nyslott, and Okhotsk Musketeer Regiments, all newly formed except for the Tambov Regiment, transferred from the 9th Infantry Division, in addition to the new 29th and 32nd Jaeger Regiments. The 18th was reorganized to include three brigades on 29 September 1809: the 1st with the Tambov and Yakutsk Musketeers, the 2nd with the Kostroma and Dnieper Musketeers, and the 3rd with the 28th and 32nd Jaegers. Its second or replacement battalions were assigned to the 4th Corps when corps were formed on 26 October 1810. The division was assigned the Konotop Recruit Depot when recruit depots were assigned to divisions on 16 March 1811, after musketeer regiments were redesignated as infantry earlier that year. The Vladimir and Aleksopol Infantry Regiments were transferred to it on 27 March from the 7th and 24th Divisions respectively, while its Yakutsk Infantry Regiment went to the 9th Division. The Aleksopol Regiment was soon transferred again, and by November the division organization remained the same as after the 1809 reorganization except that the Vladimir Regiment had replaced the Yakutsk in the 1st Brigade.

As the army prepared for the 1812 French invasion of Russia, the division was assigned to the Third Reserve Army of Observation on 5 May, and became part of its Infantry Corps of General Sergei Kamensky by June. When the army again reorganized on 29 August 1814 after the end of the War of the Sixth Coalition, the division was part of the 7th Infantry Corps, which was assigned to the 2nd Army when the active forces were divided into two armies on 28 October. By October 1819 the division was reorganized to consist of the 1st Brigade with the Kazan and Vladimir Regiments, the 2nd with the Vyatka and Ufa Regiments, and the 3rd with the 36th and 32nd Jaegers. Though the division was one of the few divisions to retain its number during the renumbering of 20 May 1820, the Vyatka Regiment transferred to the 1st Brigade and replaced the Vladimir Regiment, the Perm Regiment replaced the Vyatka Regiment in the 2nd Brigade, and the 35th Jaegers replaced the 32nd in the 3rd Brigade. The third battalions of its regiments were assigned to the Kherson Military settlement by 1825.

When the army was reorganized on 22 September 1829, it became part of the 5th Infantry Corps of the 1st Army with its 1st Brigade including the Kamchatka and Okhotsk Infantry, the 2nd the Yakutsk and Selenginsk Infantry, and the 3rd as before. It was renumbered as the 14th Infantry Division on 28 January 1833, with its 3rd Brigade of Jaegers disbanded and merged into the Kamchatka and Okhotsk Regiments, which were redesignated as Jaegers to form the 2nd Brigade; the 1st Brigade remained as before. The division would continue this structure for the rest of its existence, and gained its final title of the 11th Infantry Division on 26 April 1835.

The division was based in Lutsk in the years leading up to 1914. It fought in World War I and was demobilized in 1918.

== Organization ==
The 11th Infantry Division was part of the 11th Army Corps.

- 1st Brigade (HQ Kremenets)
  - 41st Selenginsk Infantry Regiment
  - 42nd Yakutsk Infantry Regiment
- 2nd Brigade (HQ Lutsk)
  - 43rd Okhotsk Infantry Regiment
  - 44th Kamchatka Infantry Regiment
- 11th Artillery Brigade
