= Jan Kanty Julian Sierawski =

Polish brigadier general (1777 to 1849)

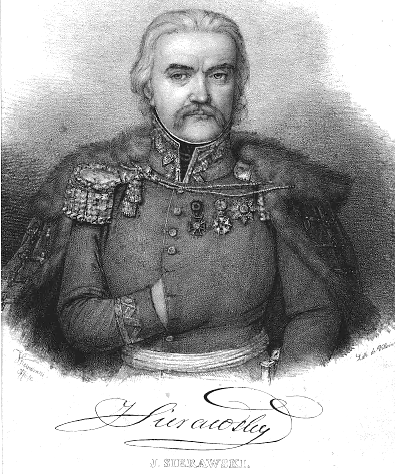
- Jan Kanty Julian Sierawski - portrait painted by Józef Kurowski (1833)
- Born: 13 February 1777; Kraków, Polish-Lithuanian Commonwealth
- Died: 29 June 1849 (aged 72); Paris, France
- Burial place: Montmartre Cemetery, Paris, France
- Military career
- Allegiance: Polish–Lithuanian Commonwealth (1794); Duchy of Warsaw (1807-1813); Congress Poland (1815-1820); Polish National Government (1830-1831)
- Service years: 1794-1830
- Rank: Brigadier general
- Units: Polish Legions; 6th Infantry Regiment; 5th Infantry Division (November Uprising)
- Conflicts: Kościuszko Uprising; Battle of Racławice; Siege of Warsaw; Denisko uprising; Battle of Debronowice; Napoleonic Wars; Austro-Polish War; Battle of Radzymin; November uprising; Battle of Wronowo; Battle of Kazimierz Dolny
- Awards: Order of Saint Stanislaus; Virtuti Militari; Legion of Honour; Order of Saint Vladimir

Jan Kanty Julian Sierawski (13 February 1777 – 29 June 1849) was a Polish brigadier general.

== Early life to Kościuszko uprising ==
Sierawski noble coat of arms

Jan Kanty Julian Sierawski was born on 13 February 1777 to Antoniego and Marianna Kośmińskich in Kraków in the Polish-Lithuanian Commonwealth. From 1786-1793 he studied in Kraków, On the day Kościuszko took the oath of office he entered military service and fought in the Kościuszko Uprising, he served in the engineer corps of the upsiring and was mainly tasked with aiding in the fortification of Kraków but he also took part in the battle of Racławice and the Siege of Warsaw. On 16 September 1794 he was sent to Troszyn under the orders of General Stanisław Wojczyński where he fought in clashes near Różan, Maków and Ostrzelka on the first of October against Prussian General Guther while trying to cross the Narew river. Sierawski was present at Magnuszewo with when General Stanisław Wojczyński surrendered and was taken prisoner by the Russian army near Novgorod and was sent to Grodno and then promptly released from it.

== Military career ==
Sierawski also fought in the Denisko Uprising under the orders of Joachim Denisko himself, in the uprising Sierawski defeated Russian troops along the Dniester river but he almost lost his life in the Battle of Debronowice on 30 June 1797 where he soon fled to Bucharest and then to Istanbul with the help of Claude Carra Saint-Cyr.

=== Napoleonic wars ===
Sierawski learned about the Polish legions in Italy from Jean-Baptiste Annibal Aubert du Bayet and set sail to Italy to enlist but got captured by Algerian corsairs and had to seek help from local consuls where he got released on 11 December 1797 and sailed to Livorno where he reached Jan Henryk Dabrowski and joined his legions where he fought in several Napoleonic campaigns. In 1807 awarded the Virtuti Militari order. On 19 January 1809 he was nominated to the rank of colonel. During the Austro-Polish War of 1809 he commanded the 6th Infantry Regiment, as part of the 1st Infantry Brigade under Michał Sokolnicki. Among other things, he led an infantry battalion in the battle of Radzymin and commanded the siege of Sandomierz. In 1812 he joined the General Confederation of the Kingdom of Poland.

On 3 February 1813, he was promoted to the rank of brigadier general. On 28 October 1813, he received the Legion of Honour. From 1815, he served in the army of Congress Poland. Among other things, he was commander of the Modlin Fortress from 1818 until 1820.

== November uprising ==
Sierawski was a supporter of the November uprising as he was made Military Governor of Warsaw from 30 November to 4 December 1830. On 14 December 1830, he was appointed commandant of the Zamość Fortress.

In March 1831, Sierawski twice received a letter from the inept Commander-in-Chief of the uprising, Jan Skrzynecki, urging him to be more active and ‘disturb’ Russian General Cyprian Belzig von Kreutz. Skrzynecki thus wanted to shrug off his responsibility for the impasse at the front and hide his lack of ideas for further military steps. Sierawski felt these letters as undeserved criticism and, affected, allowed himself to be ambitious. He advanced eastwards with his corps composed of freshly formed units. He crossed the Vistula river successfully on 14 April and that was the end of his successes. After Kreutz had concentrated his army both their armies faced off at the battle of Wronowo on 17 April, which he lost but inflicted heavy losses on Kreutz army and retreated with his army in good condition. The defeat of his armies at Kazimierz Dolny on 18 April put an end to his offensive and may have determined his defeat on the south-eastern front.

From 5 June to 18 September 1831, he was commander of the 5th Infantry Division during the November Uprising.

== Personal life ==
After the defeat of the uprising, he went into exile and in 1832 arrived in Besançon in France. In 1835 he was sentenced by the Russian authorities to have his property confiscated for participation in the November Uprising.

Sierawski also took part in Napoelons funeral on 15 December 1840 where he marched with Polish soldiers who fought with/alongside Napoleon Bonaparte.

Sierawski lived in Neuille with his health in worsening condition, he was having severe financial problems and had to beg other polish émigrés for support. On 29 June 1849 he died in Neuilly-sur-Seine due to contracting cholera, he was buried at Neuilly-sur-Seine Old Communal Cemetery but his body got transferred to Montmartre Cemetery in 1857.

He was a member in the fourth degree of the Slavic Unity freemasonry lodge.

== Legacy ==
Many of Sierawskis memoirs, military writings, poems and letters are held in the Polish Library in Paris.

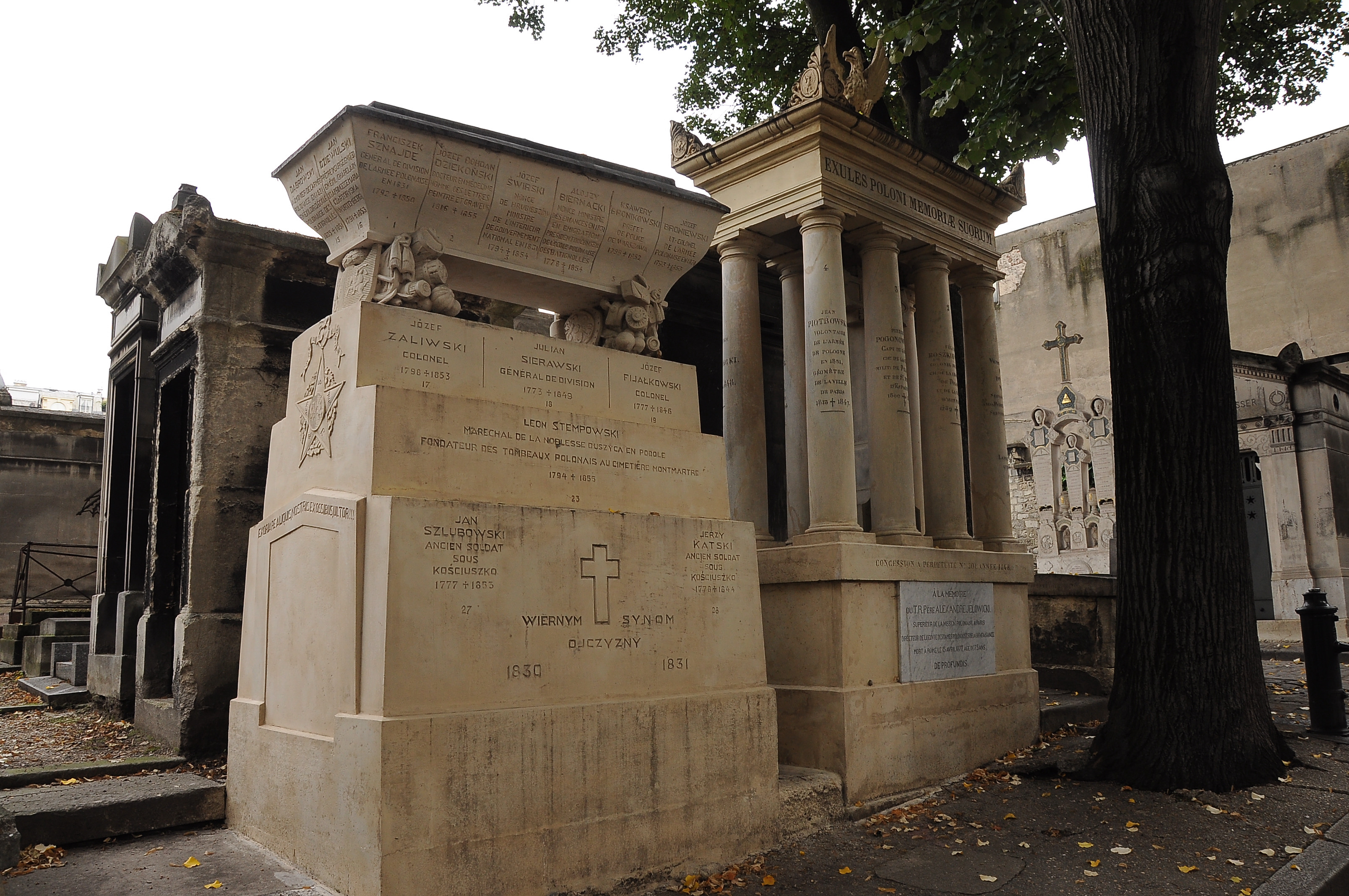
Sierawskis grave in Montmartre Cemetery (left side )

== Honours and awards ==
- Order of Saint Stanislaus II class (1815)
- Virtuti Militari (1808)
- Knight's and Officer's Cross of the Legion of Honour (France, 1809 and 1813)
- Order of Saint Vladimir III class (Russian Empire, 1816)
