= 14th Cuirassier Regiment (Duchy of Warsaw) =

- 14 Pułk Kirasjerów
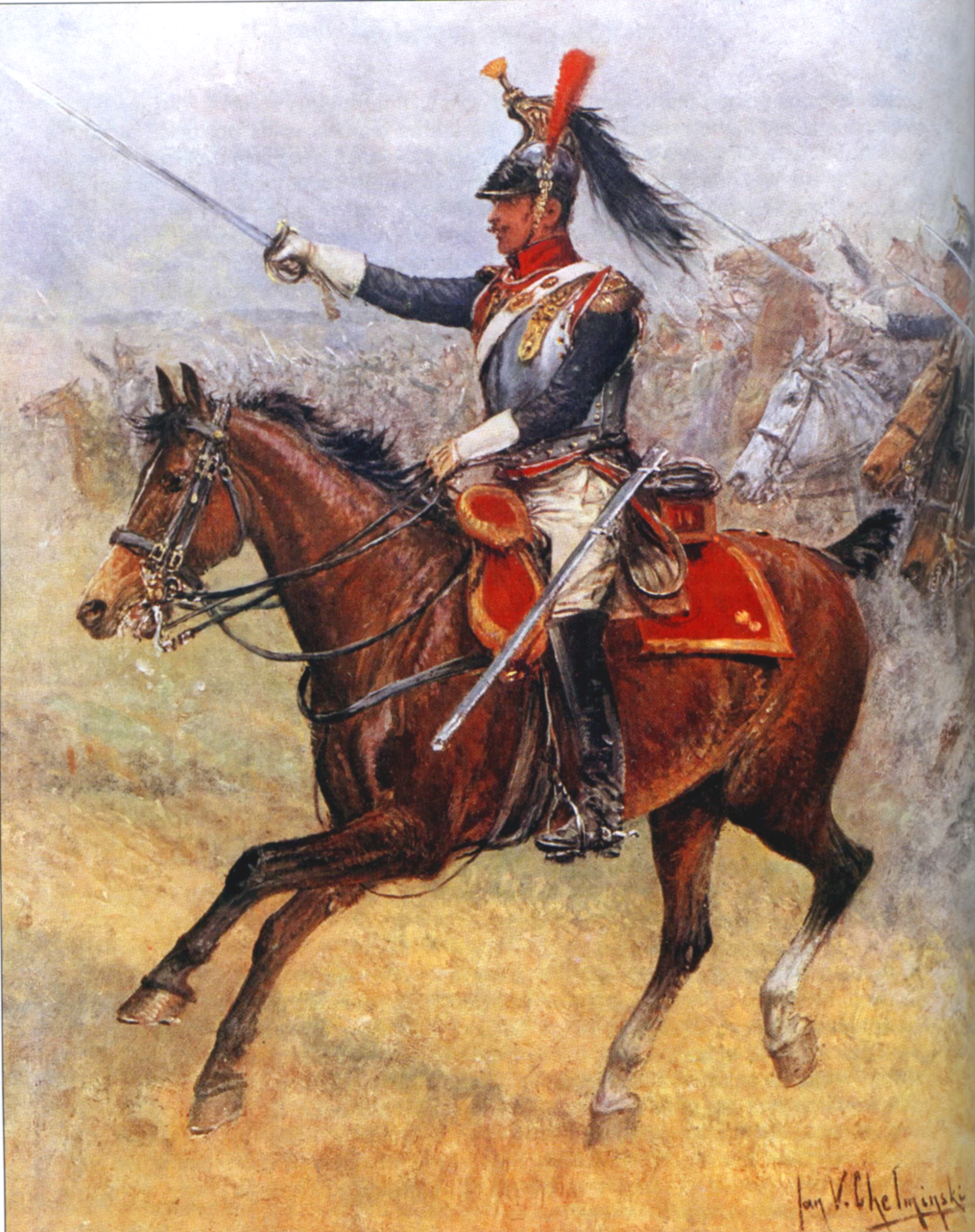
- 14th Cuirassier Regiment
- Active: 1809–1813
- Country: Duchy of Warsaw
- Branch: Army of the Duchy of Warsaw
- Type: Cavalry
- Size: 610 men (1809)
- Garrison/HQ: Warsaw
- Engagements: Napoleonic Wars: French invasion of Russia; Battle of Borodino; Battle of Leipzig

The 14th Cuirassier Regiment (Polish: 14 Pułk Kirasjerów) was the only cuirassier regiment of the Army of the Duchy of Warsaw.

== History ==
The regiment was established by Stanisław Małachowski in Końskie. The regiment was originally named the 1 Pułk Broni Kirasjerów. According to the custom of the time, the founder became its commander, and on the 1st of September 1809, Colonel Kazimierz Dziekoński became the commander. The regiment was then garrisoned in Warsaw. At the end of December 1809, the regiment's strength amounted to 610 men. The following year, however, it only had 419 men.

=== 1812 ===
In 1812, the regiment participated in Napoleon's invasion of Russia. It was assigned to Victor de Fay de La Tour-Maubourg's 4th Reserve Cavalry Corps, alongside the Saxon Garde du Corps, the regiment was assigned to the 7th Cavalry Division.

They experienced their first engagement on September 7, 1812, at the Battle of Borodino, where they captured 300 Russians. 114 officers and soldiers were killed or wounded, out of an initial strength of 180 men. The regiment's major, Jabłoński, was killed.

During the retreat from Moscow, several dozen surviving cuirassiers escorted 24 salvaged cannons of the Polish forces. Among the cavalry, the regiment suffered the heaviest losses. In Nowy Korczyn, where the remnants of the regiment were being gathered, only 5 officers, 76 cuirassiers, and 31 horses were accounted for.

=== 1813 ===
In February 1813, the 14th Cuirassier Regiment was reconstituted under the command of Colonel Kazimierz Dziekoński.

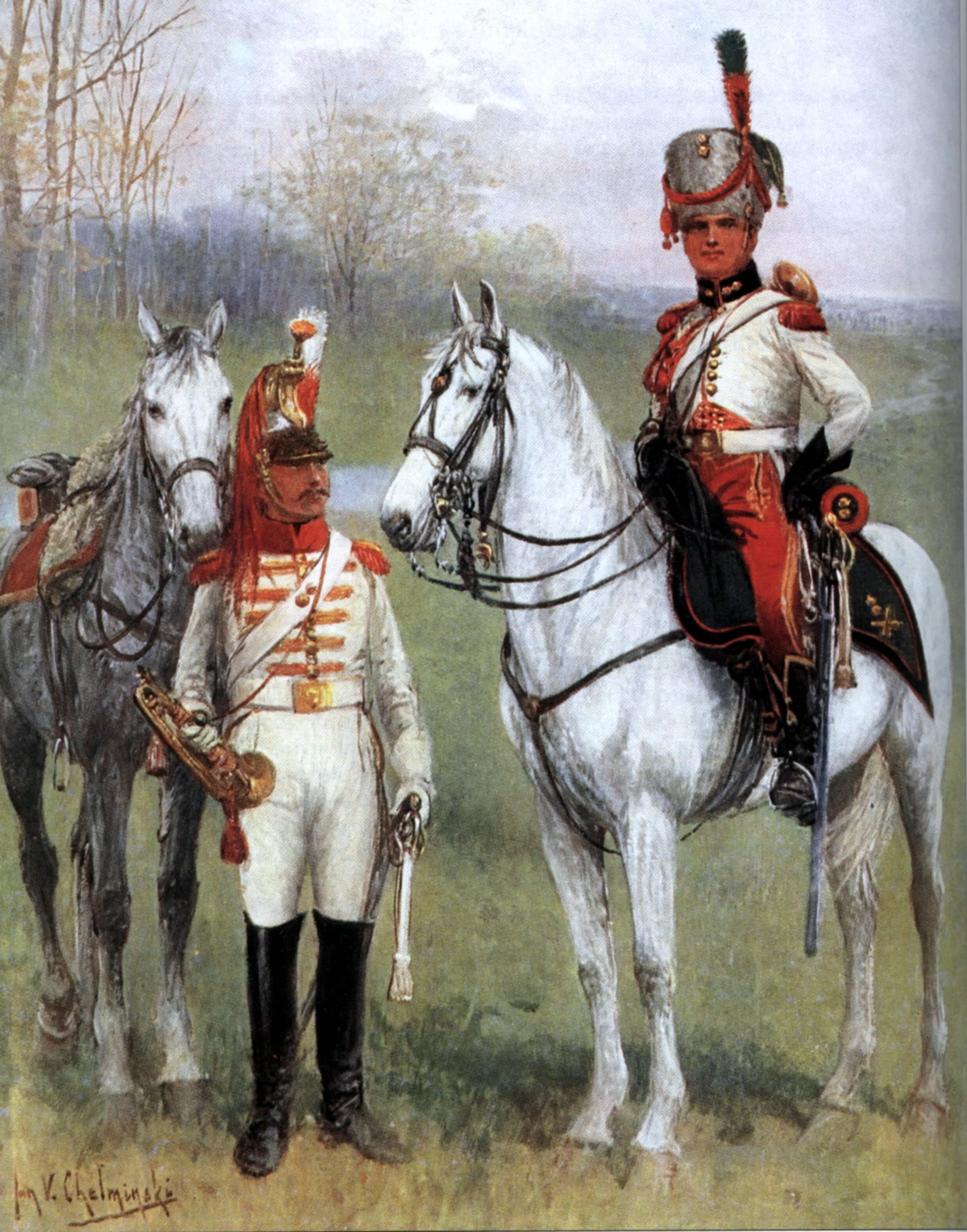
On the left is a trumpeter of the 14th Cuirassier Regiment.

Together with the 4th Mounted Rifle Regiment and the 15th Uhlan Regiment, it formed the left brigade under Józef Benedykt Łączyński.

The unit also participated in the German campaign of 1813 and joined Kellermann's 4th Cavalry Reserve Corps in the summer of 1813. The cuirassiers then formed the avant-garde brigade under the command of General Umiński. On September 9, 1813, at Strahwalde, this brigade routed a detachment of Russian Cossacks and dragoons, who lost 35 men. The 14th Cuirassiers fought for the last time at the Battle of Leipzig from October 16 to 19.

== Uniform ==
In full dress, the jacket is dark blue with red lapels and a red collar. The cuffs are also red with dark blue piping, and two grenades adorn the turnbacks of the coat. Within the Polish cuirassier regiment, only the trumpeters had uniforms very distinct from those worn by their French counterparts.
