= 5th Infantry Regiment (Duchy of Warsaw) =

5th Infantry regiment
- 5 Pułk Piechoty
- Active: 1806 - 1814
- Allegiance: Duchy of Warsaw
- Branch: Army of the Duchy of Warsaw
- Type: Infantry
- Part of: 2nd Division; Gdańsk Division - 1811
- Garrison/HQ: Płock, Częstochowa and Łabiszyn
- Engagements: Napoleonic wars; War of the Fourth Coalition; Polish-Austrian War; French invasion of Russia; Battle of Smolensk; German campaign of 1813; Siege of Danzig

Commanders
- Notable commanders: Michał Gedeon Radziwiłł

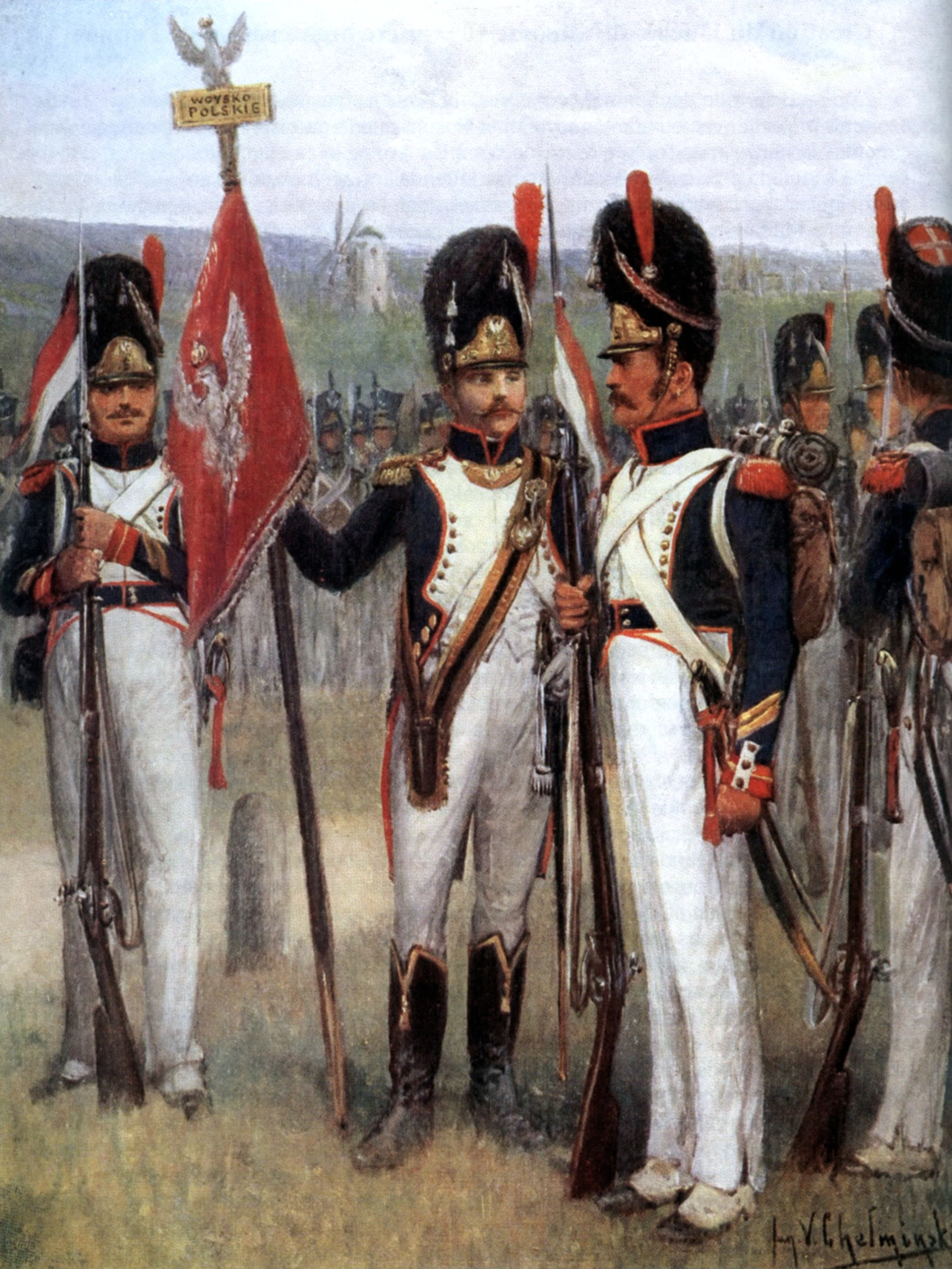
Painting of the 5th Infantry Regiment by Jan Chełmiński.

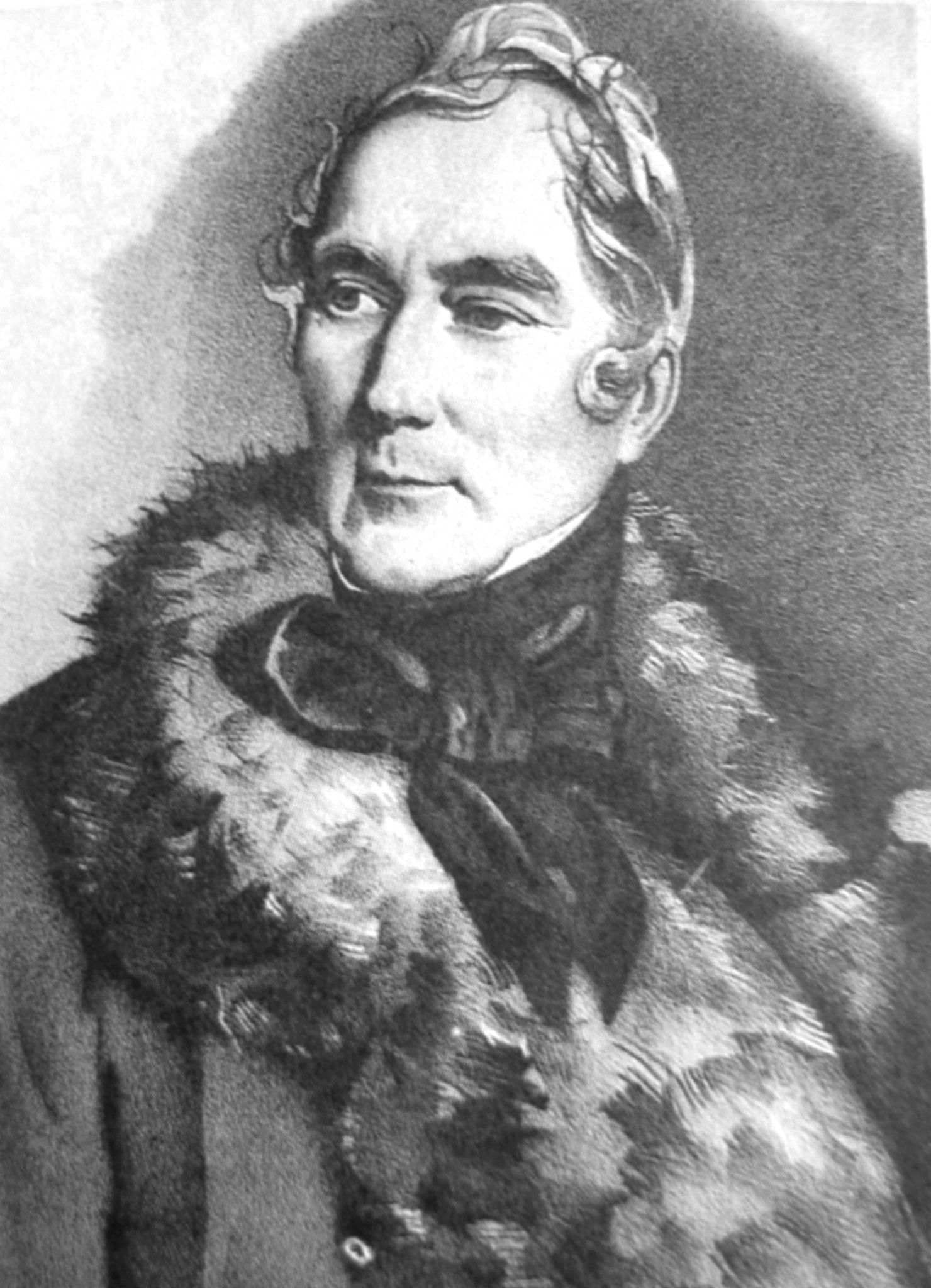
Michał Gedeon Radziwiłł, commander of the 5th Infantry Regiment who took charge of it in April 1808.

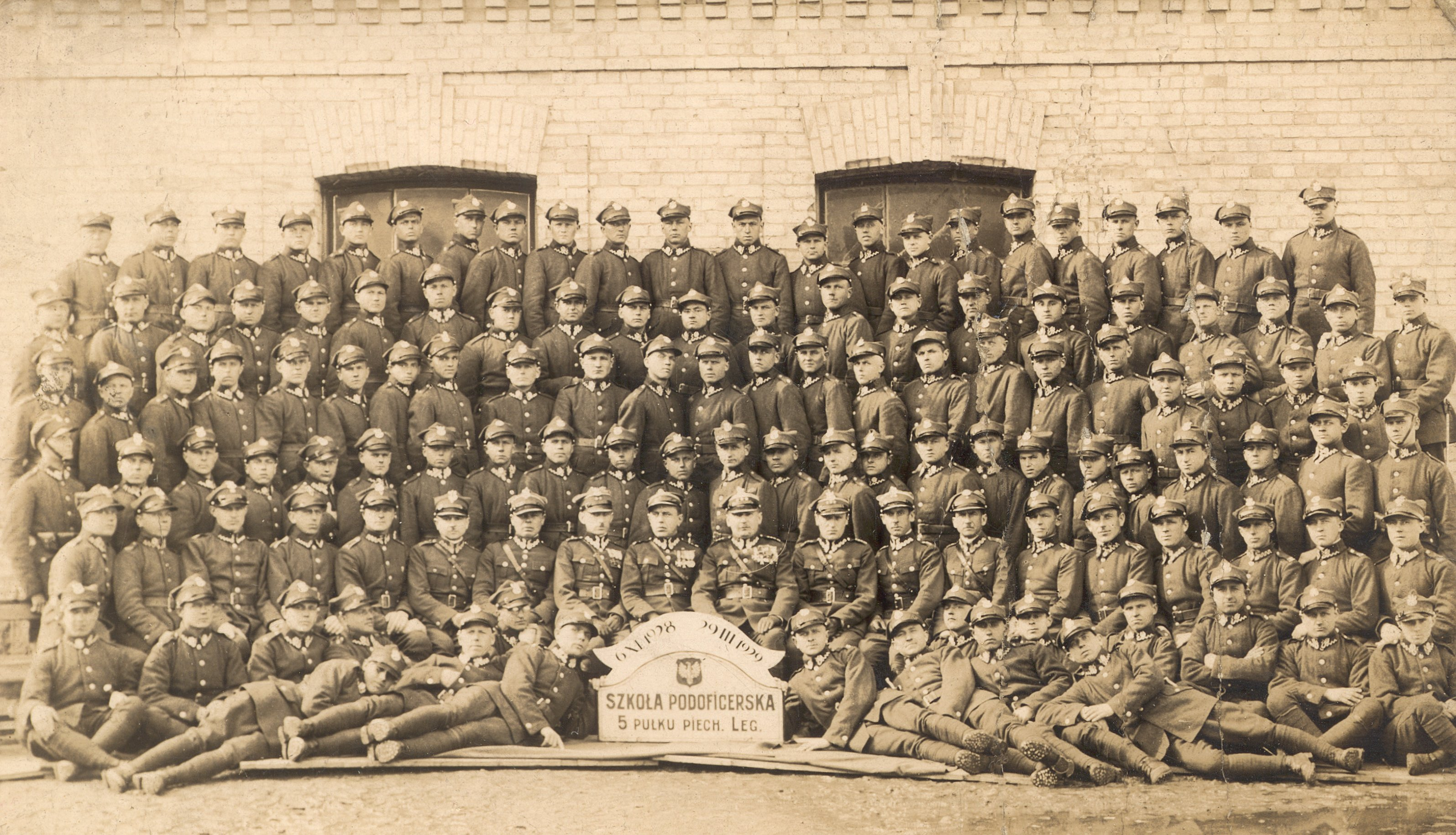
5th Legions' Infantry Regiment which continued the traditions of the 5th infantry regiment.

The 5th Infantry Regiment (Polish: 5 Pułk Piechoty) was an infantry regiment in the Army of the Duchy of Warsaw.

== Formation and organisation ==
The 5th Infantry Regiment origionally was called the 1st Infantry Regiment of the Vistula Legion (Polish:1 pułku piechoty Legii Kaliskiej). It had its origins in the forest rifle battalion of the Płock Department, formed in the spring of 1806 in Płock under the command of Colonel Ignacy Zieliński.

Following the arrival of the Northern Legions in the Duchy of Warsaw in April 1807, the infantry was reorganised, as a result of which soldiers from the 1st and 2nd battalions of the Legion were incorporated into the 5th Regiment. After the 25th of June 1807 the regiment left Płock iand it arrived at its new garrison in Częstochowa, and at the time gaining its name thee 5th Infantry Regiment. In 1809, work began on reorganising the infantry. The regiment was to consist of three battalions. By the time war broke out, the regiment had not yet reached full strength.

After the end of the War of the Fourth Coalition, In accordance with the order of 10 August 1807, Colonel Dziewanowski’s 5th Infantry Regiment was stationed as a garrison in Łabiszyn. According to the 1810 census, the regiment consisted of a 27-strong staff and three infantry battalions, each comprising six companies. The battalion staffs were to consist of 4 officers, and the companies of 136 soldiers. In total, the regiment was to have 2,487 soldiers. In reality, the unit’s strength was slightly lower.

In early 1810, the regiment came under French command and its two battalions were sent to Gdańsk as garrison troops. The regimental headquarters remained in Łęczyca. At that time, a fourth battalion was formed, and the regiment was temporarily transferred to Kostrzyn.

During the prelude to the French invasion of Russia it joined General Grandjean’s 7th Division.

After the abdication of Napoleon, Tsar Alexander I gave his consent for the Polish troops to be sent home. They were to help form the Army of Congress Poland under the command of Grand Duke Constantine. On 13 June 1814, the regiment was assigned a staging area in Lublin.

== Commanders ==
The commanders of this regiment were:

- Colonel Ignacy Zieliński (1 April 1807),
- Colonel Prince Michał Gedeon Radziwiłł (19 January 1807 – 27 December 1811),
- Major Stefan Oskierko (27 December 1811–18 January 1813),
- Colonel Cyprian Zdzitowiecki (18 January 1813–January 1814).

== Battles and skirmishes ==
During the Austro-Polish War, the 3rd Battalion of the 5th Infantrry Regiment distinguished itself in the defence of Częstochowa and the Battle of Grzybów. In recognition of the valour shown in the battles of the 1809 campaign, the soldiers of the unit were awarded: 4 Knight’s Crosses, 9 gold and 19 silver medals of the Virtuti Militari War Order.

During Napoleon’s campaign in Russia in 1812, the regiment formed part of General Michał Radziwiłł’s brigade in General Grandjen’s 7th Division. In June 1812, the regiment, together with the brigade, came under the command of Marshal Macdonald. It fought, amongst other places, at Tilsit and Daugavpils.

During the German campaign of 1813, the 5th Infantry Regiment formed part of the garrison defending Gdańsk. Following Napoleon’s defeat at Leipzig and with no prospect of relief, the city’s defenders surrendered in January 1814.

Battles and skirmishes:

Battles and skirmishes	Date
Defence of Częstochowa	1809
Żarnowiec	11 July 1812
Tylża	24 June 1812
Daugavpils	30 July 1812
Gansenburg	1 October 1812
Smolensk	1812
Neugal	7 November 1812
Walkow	16 November 1812
Tylża	28 December 1812
Siege of Danzig	1813

== Uniform ==
The dress code of 3 September 1810 did not lead to the complete standardisation of the infantry uniform. Some regiments differed quite significantly from the regulations. (Note: The differences outlined by Gembarzewski on the basis of contemporary drawings, accounts and other regimental documents.) In the 5th Infantry Regiment, these were grenadier caps without a peak or metal plate; in the centre at the front was a brass grenade; and they had crimson cords.
