= 19th Lithuanian Uhlan Regiment =

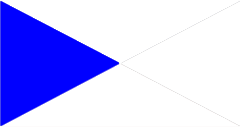
- Lance pennant
- Active: 1812–1813
- Country: Lithuania (1812)
- Engagements: French invasion of Russia; War of the Sixth Coalition; Battle of Sieraków

Commanders
- First and only: Konstanty Rajecki

19th Lithuanian Uhlan Regiment – uhlan regiment of the Army of the Duchy of Warsaw.

== Formation and fighting ==
Formed in 1812 in Novogroduk, former Grand Duchy of Lithuania from conscripts from the Grodno Department and part of the Vilnius Department. To streamline the formation of units, special commissioners were appointed to support regimental commanders. In the 19th Uhlan Regiment, this was Ensign of Puża Ossowski. In July 1812, the regiment was joined by 36 deserters and prisoners of war from the Imperial Russian Army.

On December 1, the regiment stationed in Kėdainiai numbered 808 officers and soldiers.

The regiment fought near Sieraków on February 12, 1813.

Later, the 19th Uhlan Regiment was merged with the 17th Lithuanian Uhlan Regiment.

Regimental color - yellow. Paczuski states that the regiment had uniforms with navy blue lapels, but with a crimson piping.

== Regimental commander ==
- Colonel Konstanty Rajecki - from 13 July 1812

== Bibliography ==
- Askenazy, Szymon; Gembarzewski (2003). Wojsko Polskie: Księstwo Warszawskie 1807–1814. Poznań: Wydawnictwo Kurpisz. ISBN 83-88841-47-5.
- Gembarzewski, Bronisław (1925). Rodowody pułków polskich i oddziałów równorzędnych od r. 1717 do r. 1831. Warszawa: Towarzystwo Wiedzy Wojskowej.
- Gepner, Stanisław (1960). Księstwo Warszawskie, 1812–1814, pułki jazdy wg akwareli R. Forthoffera. Ze zbiorów specjalnych Centralnej Biblioteki Wojskowej: Stanislaw Gepner.
- Minkiewicz, Jan (1985). Ułańskie dzieje. Londyn: VERITAS.
- Morawski, Ryszard; Paczuski (2009). Wojsko Księstwa Warszawskiego. Ułani, gwardie honorowe, pospolite ruszenie, żandarmeria konna. Warszawa. ISBN 978-83-61229-03-2.
- Żygulski jun., Zdzisław; Wielecki (1988). Polski mundur wojskowy. Kraków: Krajowa Agencja Wydawnicza. ISBN 83-03-01483-8.
