= Leon Urmowski =

Polish artist and army officer (c. 1794–1814)

- Born: c. 1794
- Died: 13 December 1814; Lublin, Duchy of Warsaw
- Cause of death: Pulmonary tuberculosis
- Military career
- Allegiance: Duchy of Warsaw
- Branch: Army of the Duchy of Warsaw
- Unit: 17th Division
- Conflicts: War of the Sixth Coalition; Battle of Berezina; Battle of Leipzig

Leon Urmowski (c. 1794 – 13 December 1814) was a Polish artist and military officer in the army of the Duchy of Warsaw, serving during the War of the Sixth Coalition.

== Biography ==
He was probably born in 1794 in Lviv, where his parents Piotr and Marianna (née Piasecka) lived. After his parents' death, he and his sister were looked after by his older brother Klemens. In January 1810, he enrolled at the Cadet School of Artillery and Engineering in Warsaw. In January 1812, he worked at the General Staff of the Army of the Duchy of Warsaw as a topographer.

Before the start of the 1812 campaign, he was assigned to the 17th Division as adjutant of the General Staff. He took part in the Battle of Berezina and in April the following year was assigned to a sapper battalion. He took part in the campaign of 1813 and was taken prisoner at the Battle of Leipzig. In August 1813 he stayed in Dresden, where he had the opportunity to learn the technique of engraving.

In March 1814 he was already in Lublin and probably joined a freemasonry lodge at that time. He took part in cartographic work and in the preparation of an urban plans of Warsaw published in 1815.

He died on 13 December 1814 in Lublin of tuberculosis, from which he had fallen seriously ill in March 1812. He was buried in Lublin's cemetery at Lipowa Street.
