= 8th Infantry Regiment =

8th Infantry Regiment may refer to the following units:

- 8th Infantry Regiment (Duchy of Warsaw)
- 8th Infantry Regiment (Lithuania)
- 8th Infantry Regiment (United States)
- 8th (The King's) Regiment of Foot

== See also ==
- 8th Regiment (disambiguation)
