= 7th Infantry Regiment (Duchy of Warsaw) =

- 7 Pułk Piechoty
- Active: 1806 - 1813
- Allegiance: Duchy of Warsaw
- Branch: Army
- Type: Infantry
- Role: 1905 soldiers - 1809
- Part of: 2nd Division
- Engagements: War of the Fourth Coalition; Peninsular War; French invasion of Russia

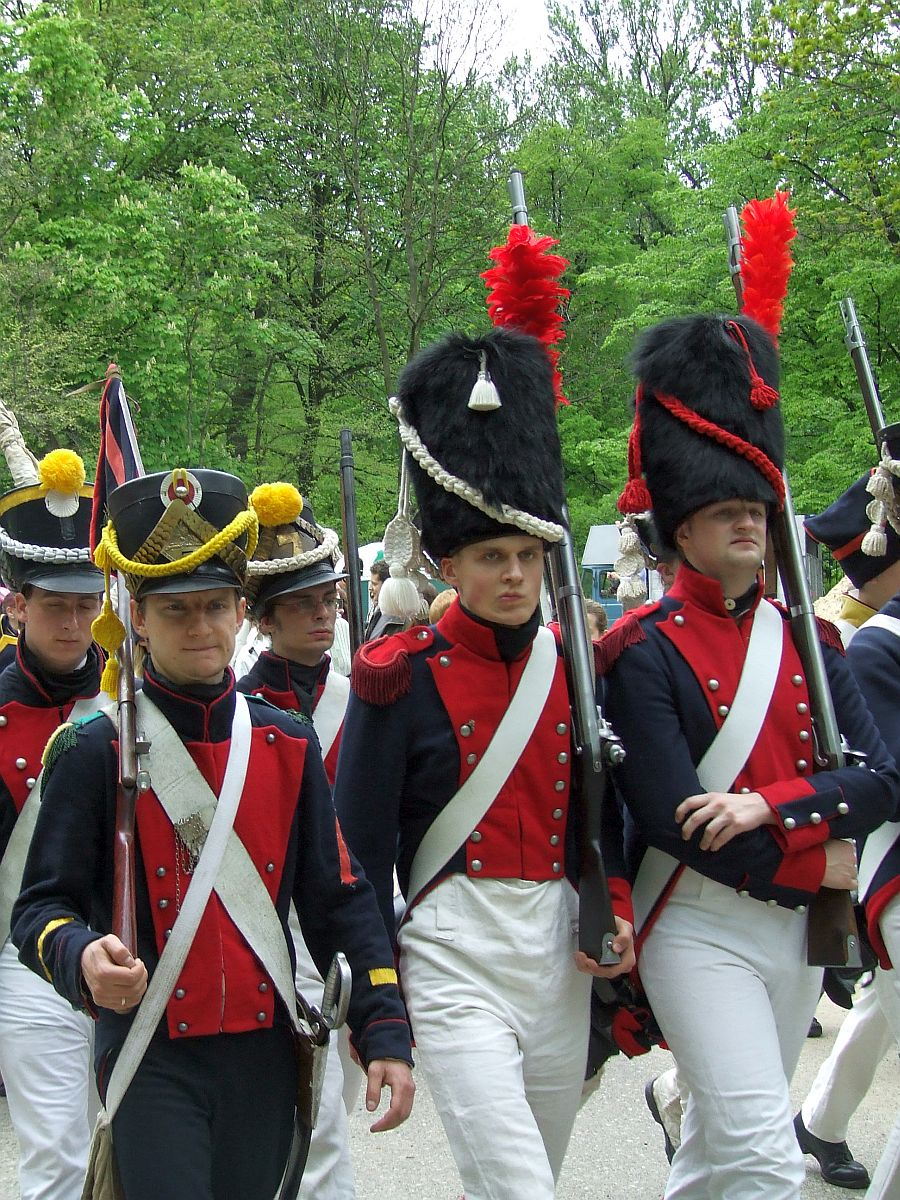
The 7th Infantry Regiment of the Duchy of Warsaw, re-enactment, parade to mark the 3rd May holiday

The 7th Infantry Regiment (Polish: 7 Pułk Piechoty) – was an infantry regiment in the Army of the Duchy of Warsaw.

== Formation and history ==
Formed in 1808 as the 3rd Infantry Regiment of the Kalisz Legion. Following the end of hostilities with the Austrian Empire, in accordance with the order of 10 August 1807, Colonel Sobolewski's 7th Infantry Regiment was stationed as a garrison in Kalisz, where it remained until 1 August 1808, after which it was sent to Spain in the Peninsular War.

In August 1808, the 7th Infantry Regiment, having already been battle-hardened, was sent out alongside regiments 4 and 9 to Spain as part of the so-called Duchy of Warsaw Division. The regiment fought, among other places, at Talavera and Toledo. Between 7 and 28 July 1809, at the Battle of Talavera de la Reina, units of the Grande Armée were defeated by the allied British, Portuguese and Spanish forces, led by Arthur Wellesley.

At the end of 1809 it numbered 1905 soldiers.

In preparation for the French invasion of Russia the regiment was absorbed into General Girards 28th Division.

Whilst in Germany, Napoleon ordered the formation of a new 4th Infantry Regiment from the remnants of the 4th, 7th and 9th Infantry Regiments, under the command of Colonel Michał Cichocki, and in early July 1813 attached it to Jan Henryk Dąbrowski's Division.

After the abdication of Napoleon, Tsar Alexander I agreed to the return of Polish troops to their homeland. They were to form the basis for the creation of the Polish Army under the command of Grand Duke Konstantin. on the 13 June 1814 the regiment was assigned a station in Bydgoszcz.

== Battles ==
Battles and Skirmishes:

Battle/skirmish	Date
Siege of Graudenz, Nibork and Koła	1807
Ciudad Real	27th March 1807
Almonacid	11th August 1809
Ocaña	10th and 19th November 1809
Venta Nueva	20th January 1810
Sierra Morena, Ronda, Malaga, Baza, Vera, Salinas	March 1812
Smoleńsk	17th August 1812

== Regimental commanders ==
Regimental commanders:

- Colonel Walenty Skórzewski (10 March 1807),
- Colonel Maciej Sobolewski (1808, killed in action on 11 August 1809),
- Colonel Stanisław Jakubowski (12 October 1809),
- Colonel Paweł Tremo (24 October 1810).

Regimental officers:

- Lieutenant Colonel Teodor Pretwicz

== Uniform ==
However, the dress code of 3 September 1810 did not lead to the complete standardisation of the infantry uniform. Some regiments differed quite significantly from the regulations. (Note: The differences outlined by Gembarzewski on the basis of contemporary drawings, accounts and other regimental documents.) In the 7th Infantry Regiment, the uniform design was the same as in the 4th Infantry Regiment, except for the colours, which were as follows: a navy blue collar with a crimson trim, crimson epaulettes, and navy blue epaulettes, sleeve tabs and shoulder straps with crimson trims, and white buttons.

== Standard ==
On a piece of silk measuring 55 cm by 55 cm, which had been painted but had faded completely by 1898, there is a French eagle painted in gold in the centre, with an inscription beneath it: "2me B-on". The reverse side is identical, except that the image of the eagle and the inscriptions are reversed; furthermore, the number seven is inscribed within the musket barrels at the corners. On the standard bears the inscription: "Pułk piechoty", on the back: "WOYSKO POLSKIE". A silver-plated eagle on the plaque.

In 1898, the banner was housed in the Kazan Cathedral in Saint Petersburg.
