= 16th Infantry Regiment (Duchy of Warsaw) =

- 16 Pułk Piechoty
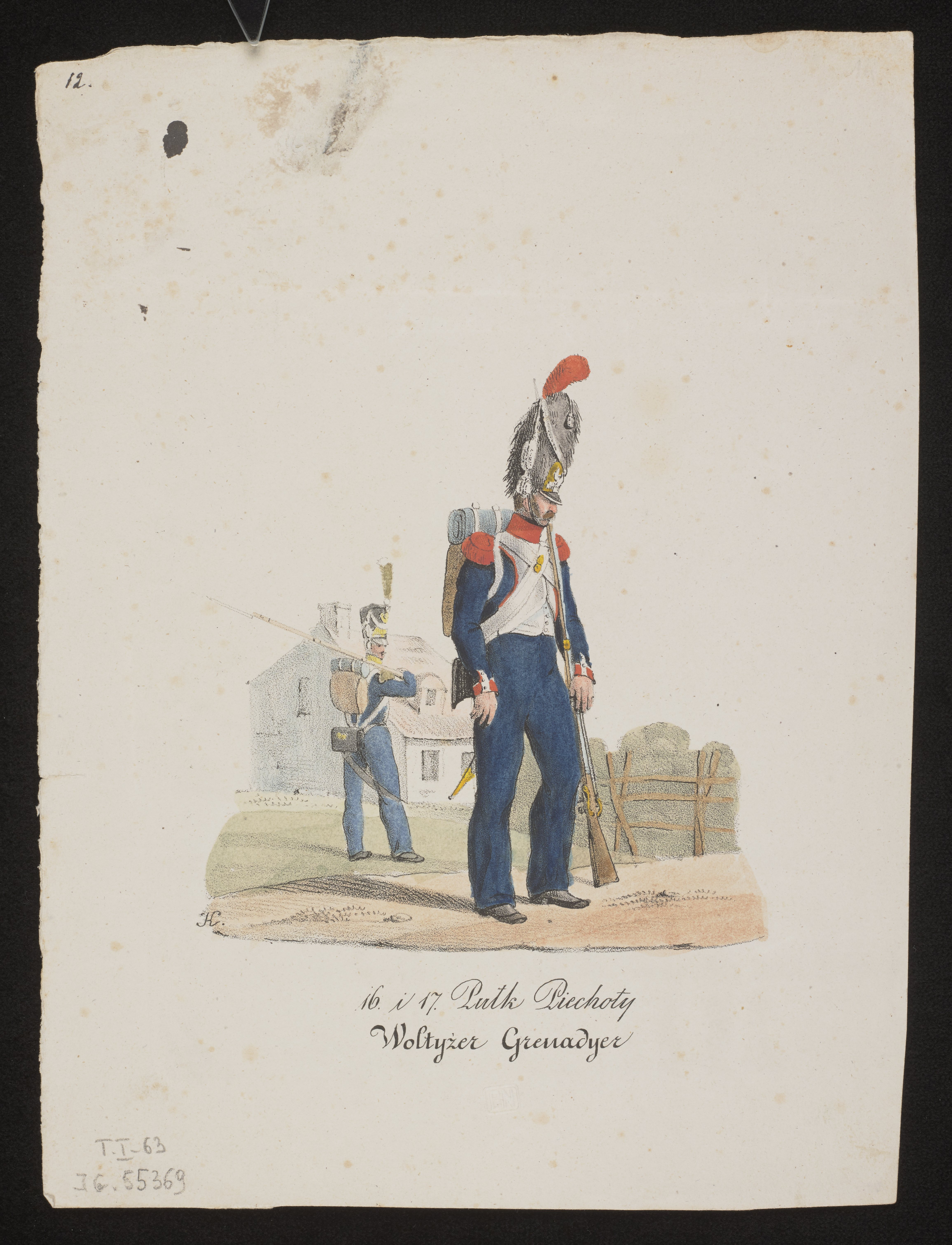
- A grenadier of the 16th Infantry Regiment
- Active: 1809–1813
- Country: Duchy of Warsaw
- Branch: Army of the Duchy of Warsaw
- Type: Infantry
- Size: Regiment
- Garrison/HQ: Warsaw, Rawa Mazowiecka

The 16th Infantry Regiment (Polish: 16 Pułk Piechoty) was a regiment of the Army of the Duchy of Warsaw during the Napoleonic Wars.

== History ==
The 16th Infantry Regiment was formed in Galicia-Lodomeria in 1809 and was called the 4th Galician-French Infantry Regiment. It was commanded by Colonel Kęszycki.

Shortly afterward, however, this regiment was disbanded. The numerical designation 16th Infantry Regiment was then transferred to the 5th Galician-French Infantry Regiment, which had also been raised in 1809. Meaning that the 16th had been reorganized as a new regiment. This regiment was formed from Polish soldiers taken prisoner while serving in the Austrian Army. It was financed by Konstanty Czartoryski.

By the end of 1809, the regiment numbered 2,333 soldiers. After the Austro-Polish War, it was stationed in Warsaw and Rawa.

According to the 1810 establishment, the regiment consisted of a 27-man headquarters and 3 infantry battalions, each composed of 6 companies. Each battalion headquarters was to have 4 personnel, while each company was authorized 136 soldiers. At full strength, the regiment was intended to have 2,487 men, although its actual strength was somewhat lower.

Under Napoleon's decree on 17 May 1811, the Duchy of Warsaw was reorganized into three divisions, and the regiment was assigned to the 1st Division.

=== 1812 ===
During the preparations for the French invasion of Russia in 1812, the regiment in the 16th Division under Józef Zajączek, itself part of the Grande Armée's V Corps.

=== 1813 ===
After the failure of the campaign, the regiment was reorganized into the 27th Division under Izydor Krasiński.

=== 1814 ===
After Napoleon's abdication, Tsar Alexander I authorized the return of the Polish units to their homeland. They were intended to serve as the foundation for the formation of the Army of Congress Poland under the command of Konstantin Pavlovich.

== Commanders ==
The regiment was commanded by:

- Konstanty Adam Czartoryski (1809)
- Ignacy Bolesta (1813)
