= 8th Infantry Regiment (Duchy of Warsaw) =

- 8 Pułk Piechoty
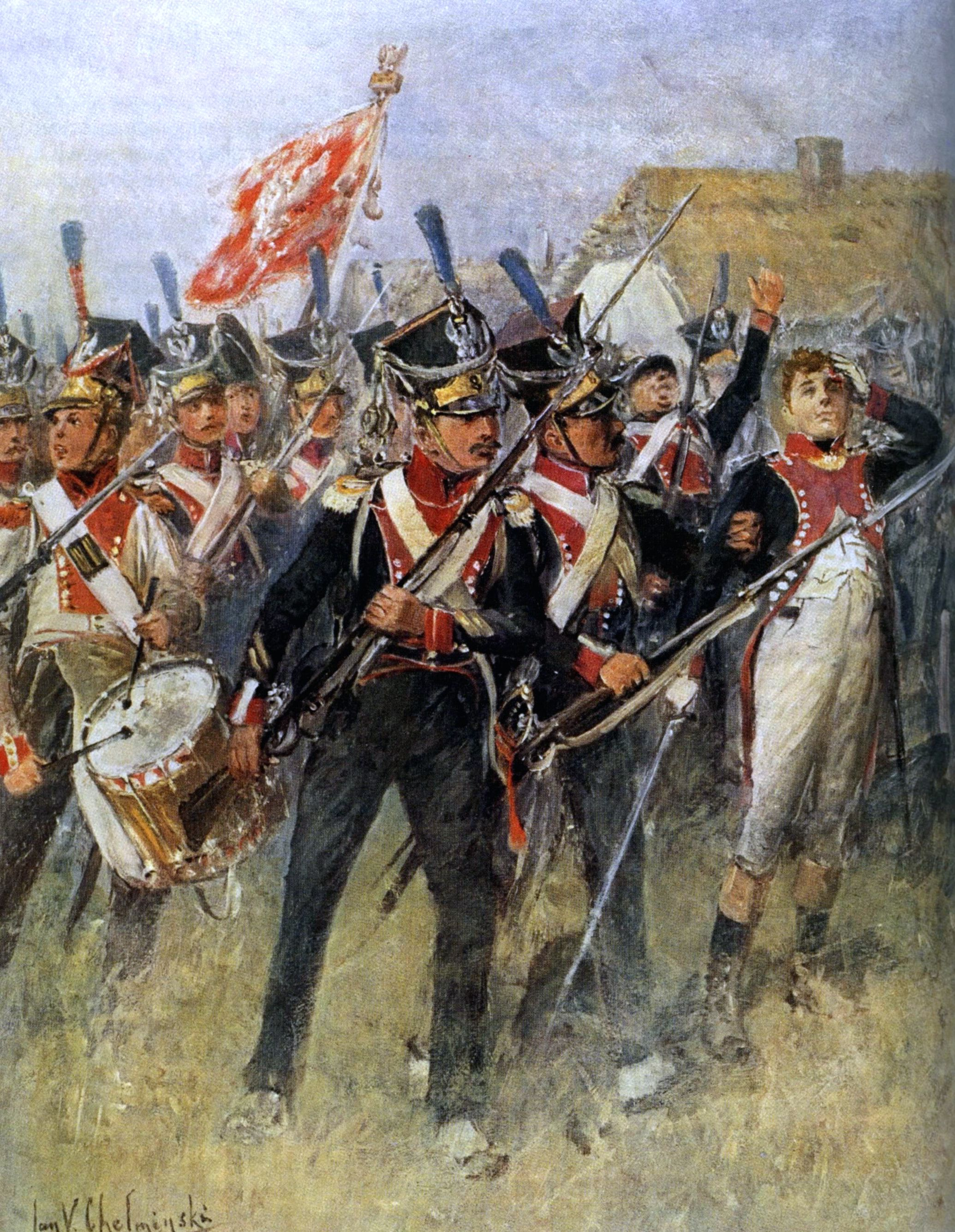
- The regiment at the 1809 Battle of Raszyn
- Active: 1807–1812
- Disbanded: 1812
- Allegiance: Duchy of Warsaw
- Branch: Army of the Duchy of Warsaw
- Type: Line infantry
- Size: Regiment
- Part of: 2nd Division; Ludwik Kamieniecki’s 18th Division - 1812; Izydora Krasiński's 27th Division - 1812
- Engagements: Austro-Polish War; Battle of Raszyn (1809); Battle of Radzymin (1809); French invasion of Russia; Battle of Smolensk; Battle of Borodino

The 8th Infantry Regiment (Polish: 8 Pułk Piechoty) was a line infantry regiment of the army of the Duchy of Warsaw.

== Formation and organisation ==
Formed as the 4th Infantry Regiment of the Kalisz Legion (Polish: 4 pułk piechoty Legii Kaliskiej) in 1807 in Kalisz. Following the end of hostilities, in accordance with the order of 10 August 1807, Colonel Cyprian Godebski’s 8th Infantry Regiment was stationed as a garrison in Konin.

In January 1807, the regiment was stationed in Kalisz, before moving to Konin. During the Austro-Polish War in 1809, due to the Duchy’s financial difficulties, the regiment was stationed at several garrisons (including Częstochowa and Modlin). The regiment distinguished itself during the war with Austria whilst defending its positions near Falenty. During the Battle of Raszyn, the regiment’s commander, Cyprian Godebski, was killed. He met his death whilst leading the regiment’s 1st Battalion into battle. By the end of 1809, the regiment numbered 2302 soldiers.

According to the 1810 establishment, the regiment consisted of a 27-strong staff and three infantry battalions, each comprising six companies. The battalion staffs were to consist of 4 officers, and the companies of 136 soldiers. In total, the regiment was to have 2487 soldiers. In reality, the unit’s strength was slightly lower.

Following Napoleon’s decree of 17 May 1811, three divisions were formed within the Duchy of Warsaw. The regiment became part of the 2nd Division.

During preparations for the French invasion of Russia The regiment was incorporated into the 18th Division commanded by Ludwik Kamieniecki, part of the 5th Corps of Prince Józef Poniatowski’s Grand Army.

Following the defeat of the Russian campaign in 1812, the regiment was re-established, comprising two battalions of 700 soldiers each. It became part of the 27th Division commanded by Izydor Krasiński. Command of the regiment was taken over by Colonel Kajetan Stuart.

After the abdication of Napoleon, Tsar Alexander I agreed to the return of Polish troops to their homeland. They were to form the basis for the creation of the Polish Army under the command of Grand Duke Konstantin. On the 13 June 1814 the regiment was concentrated at Płock.

== Battles and Skirmishes ==
Battles and Skirmishes of the 8th Infantry Regiment were:

Battles/skirmishes	Date
Raszyn	19 April 1809
Sandomierz	17 and 18 May 1809
Baranów	9 June 1809
Jankowice	11 June 1809
Wrzawy	12 June 1809
Smoleńsk	17 August 1812
Borodino	7 September 1812
Woronowo	18 October 1812

== Regimental commanders ==
The commanders of the 8th Infantry Regiment were:

- Col. Cyprian Godebski (8 March 1807 - 19 April 1809),
- Col. Kajetan Stuart (5 May 1809)

== Uniform ==
The dress code of 3 September 1810 did not lead to the complete standardisation of the infantry uniform. Some regiments differed quite significantly from the regulations. (Note: The differences outlined by Gembarzewski on the basis of contemporary drawings, accounts and other regimental documents) In the 8th Infantry Regiment, these were plain berets with white bands; the sappers’ jackets were crimson with white trim and insignia embroidered on the sleeves.

== Standard ==
In the collections of the Czartoryski Museum in Kraków the crimson standard of the 8th Infantry Regiment is found, measuring 42 cm × 42 cm, within a laurel wreath embroidered with multicoloured silks, featuring a blue ribbon edged with black silk, the inscription: „Półk 8-my Piechoty” (‘8th Infantry Regiment’) embroidered in black silk. On the reverse side, of the standard, the inscription: „Batalion 1-szy” (“1st Battalion”). At the top of the standard a small embroidered inscription: “M. Kochanowska”. The pennant is edged on three sides with silver fringe.
