= 21st Lithuanian Mounted Rifle Regiment =

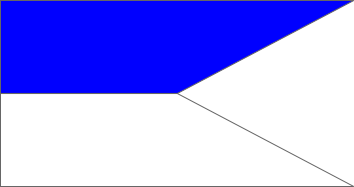
- Lance pennant
- Active: 1812–1813
- Country: Lithuania (1812)
- Engagements: French invasion of Russia

Commanders
- First and only: Ignacy Moniuszko

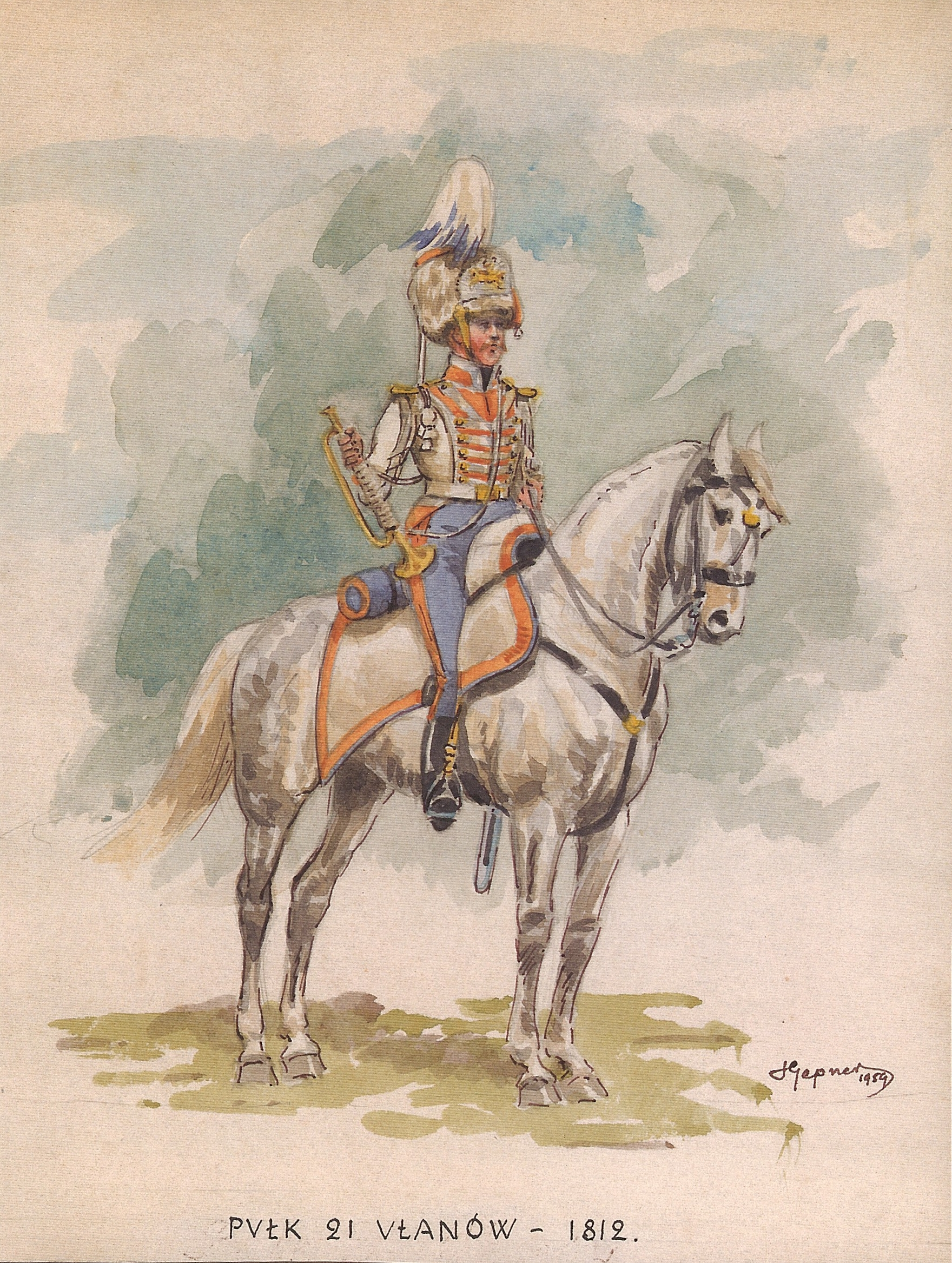
Trumpeter of the 21st Regiment

21st Lithuanian Mounted Rifle Regiment – chasseurs à cheval regiment of the Army of the Duchy of Warsaw.

This regiment is problematic in historiogaphy, due to some sources saying it was the 21st Uhlan Regiment, others suggest there were two regiments numbered 21; still others call it a cavalry regiment, without specifying its type.

== History of the regiment ==
Formed from volunteers on September 22, 1812, in Vilnius.

Aleksander Pociej took the initiative to establish the 21st Mounted Rifle Regiment. However, he lacked sufficient funds, and as a result, the regiment's number was transferred to a unit organized by Ignacy Moniuszko. Moniuszko's regiment also incorporated the embryonic hussar regiment organized by Mikołaj and Ignacy Abramowicz (who later became a major in the mounted rifle regiment), and the regiment organized in Pinsk by Colonel Jan Grzymała-Lubański. In November, the regiment's only assembled squadron numbered 10 officers and 258 soldiers, most of them without a mount.

The regiment took part in the Napoleonic campaign against Russia.

Regimental colour - orange, but it was called an uhlan regiment in the publication.

== Regimental commander ==
- Aleksander Pociej (He did not form a regiment)
- Colonel Ignacy Moniuszko - from September 23, 1812:

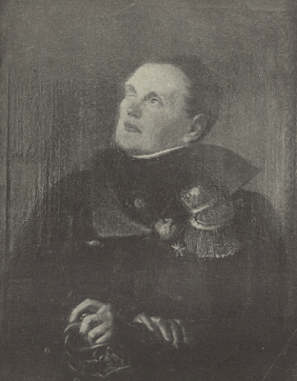
Portrait of Czeslaw Moniuszko in an officer's uniform of this regiment

== Bibliography ==
- Askenazy, Szymon; Gembarzewski (2003). Wojsko Polskie: Księstwo Warszawskie 1807–1814. Poznań: Wydawnictwo Kurpisz. ISBN 83-88841-47-5.
- Gembarzewski, Bronisław (1964). Żołnierz polski. Ubiór, uzbrojenie i oporządzenie od wieku XI do roku 1960. T.3 od 1797 do 1814 roku. Warszawa.
- Gembarzewski, Bronisław (1925). Rodowody pułków polskich i oddziałów równorzędnych od r. 1717 do r. 1831. Warszawa: Towarzystwo Wiedzy Wojskowej.
- Korzon, Tadeusz; Gembarzewski; Rogowa (2003). Dzieje wojen i wojskowości w Polsce. Poznań: Kurpisz. ISBN 83-88841-52-1.
- Kukiel, Marian (1993). Zarys historii wojskowości w Polsce. London: Puls. ISBN 0-907587-99-2.
- Linder, Karol (1960). Dawne Wojsko Polskie. Ubiór i uzbrojenie. Warszawa: Wydawnictwo Ministerstwa Obrony Narodowej.
- Minkiewicz, Jan (1985). Ułańskie dzieje. Londyn: VERITAS.
- Morawski, Ryszard; Paczuski (2009). Wojsko Księstwa Warszawskiego. Ułani, gwardie honorowe, pospolite ruszenie, żandarmeria konna. Warszawa. ISBN 978-83-61229-03-2.
- Zych, Gabriel (1961). Armia Księstwa Warszawskiego 1807 - 1812. Warszawa: Wydawnictwo Ministerstwa Obrony Narodowej.
- Żygulski jun, Zdzisław; Wielecki (1988). Polski mundur wojskowy. Kraków: Krajowa Agencja Wydawnicza. ISBN 83-03-01483-8.
