= 6th Infantry Regiment (Duchy of Warsaw) =

- 6 Pułk Piechoty
- Active: 1806-1814
- Country: Duchy of Warsaw
- Branch: Land Army
- Type: Infantry
- Part of: 2nd Division; 17 Division - 1812
- Engagements: War of the Fifth Coalition; Austro-Polish War; Battle of Raszyn; Battle of Radzymin; French invasion of Russia; War of the Sixth Coalition

Commanders
- Notable commanders: Ignacy Zieliński; Jan Kanty Julian Sierawski; Maciej Sobolewski

The 6th Infantry Regiment (Polish: 6 Pułk Piechoty) was an infantry unit in the Army of the Duchy of Warsaw.

== Formation and organisational change ==
The infantry regiment was formed in 1806 in Dobrce near Kalisz. At the end of 1809 the regiment had 2,673 soldiers. According to the 1810 etat, the regiment consisted of a 27-man staff and three infantry battalions of six companies each. The battalions' staff were to consist of four men, and the companies of 136 soldiers. A total of 2,487 soldiers were to serve in the regiment. In fact, the unit's personnel was somewhat smaller.

According to Napoleon's order of 17 May 1811, three divisions were formed in the Duchy of Warsaw. The regiment became a part of the 2nd Division.

During the preparations for the invasion of Russia in 1812, the regiment was incorporated into the structure of the 17th Division of Jan Henryk Dąbrowski's V Corps of the Grand Army of Prince Józef Poniatowski.

After Napoleon's abdication, Tsar Alexander I agreed to send Polish troops back to the Poland. They were to form the base for the formation of the Polish Army under the command of Grand Duke Constantine. On 13 June 1814, the regiment was assigned a place of concentration in Siedlce.

== Commanders ==
The regiment was commanded by:

- Colonel Maciej Sobolewski,
- Colonel Ignacy Zieliński,
- Colonel Jan Kanty Julian Sierawski (from the 19th of January 1809).

== Uniform ==
The dress regulation of 3 September 1810 did not lead to a complete standardisation of the infantry uniform. Some regiments differed quite significantly from the regulation arrangements. (Note: Differences presented by Gembarzewski based on drawings, accounts and other regimental documents of the time.)

In the 6th Infantry Regiment, these were the bearskins of the grenadiers - which lacked visors, plates, and grenade symbols. Their cordons were a light red color, too.

== Standard ==
The standard of the regiment came into being in 1807. It consists of a Polish eagle, embroidered in white silk, on a crimson silk cloth, which measures 50 centimeters X 54 centimeters. The eagle's crown, beak, sceptre and apple are embroidered with yellow threads - as is the inscription: ‘6 PUŁK PIECHOTY’ (6th Infantry Regiment). The whole standard is surrounded by a yellow, silk fringe. It is now displayed in the Czartoryski Museum in Kraków.
