= Lithuanian Rifle Regiment =

1st Lithuanian Rifle Infantry Regiment
- 1 Pułk Strzelców Pieszych Litewskich
- Active: 1812–1813
- Disbanded: 1813
- Country: Duchy of Warsaw
- Branch: Army
- Type: Infantry
- Size: 341 (4 December 1812)
- Engagements: French invasion of Russia

Commanders
- Notable commanders: Józef Kossakowski

The 1st Lithuanian Foot Rifle Regiment (Polish: 1 Pułk Strzelców Pieszych Litewskich) also known commonly as the Lithuanian Rifle Regiment (Polish: Pułk Strzelców Litewskich) was an infantry regiment in the Army of the Duchy of Warsaw, active from 1812 to 1813.

== 1812 ==
=== Formation ===
On 12 August 1812, the Lithuanian Provisional Governing Commission decreed the creation of two battalions, which in November 1812, were merged in Minsk into the 1st Lithuanian Rifle Regiment. The 1st Battalion was commanded by Józef Kossakowski, while the 2nd Bn. by Rokicki. Count Kazimierz Plater became the commander of the 3rd Bn., formed later in Vilnius.

=== November–December ===
On 4 November 1812, the 1st Bn. was stationed in Timkavichy, and counted 624 riflemen, while the 2nd was stationed in Nyasvizh. The 3rd Bn. was based in Vilnius and had 249 riflemen at that time.

The regiment fought in the vicinity of Timkavichy in the early November 1812. and the rest of the 1st and 2nd Bns. then fought in Paneriai, and on 4 December the Regiment's 1st and 2nd Bns. entered Vilnius, joining the 3rd Bn. stationed there. In Vilnius, the regiment numbered 341 soldiers.

=== 2nd Lithuanian Rifle Regiment ===
In addition to the three battalions used in combat, from December 1812, the 4th Bn. was formed in Grodno under Kurczewski's command. Obuchowicz's 5th Bn. and Hański's 6th Bn. were also to be formed, but they remained only on paper (apart from the 4th Bn. which ended up being formed and was used) and these last three battalions were to form the 2nd Lithuanian Foot Rifle Regiment but this did not come to fruition.

== 1813 ==
During the retreat of Napoleon's Grande Armée from Russia, the Lithuanian Rifle Regiment was devasted and Kurczewski's 4th Bn. arrived with the rest of the army in Warsaw. It consisted of 40 officers and 23 soldiers and as part of the army's reorganisation in 1813, the unit was incorporated into the Lithuanian infantry regiments.
