= 20th Lithuanian Uhlan Regiment =

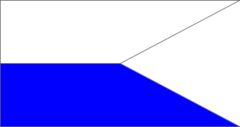
- Lance pennant
- Active: 1812–1813
- Country: Lithuania (1812)
- Engagements: French invasion of Russia

Commanders
- First and only: Ksawery Obuchowicz

20th Lithuanian Uhlan Regiment – uhlan regiment of the Army of the Duchy of Warsaw.

== Formation and fighting ==
Formed in 1812 in Pinsk from conscripts from the Białystok Department and part of the Grodno Department. To streamline the formation of units, special commissioners were appointed to support regimental commanders. In the 20th Uhlan Regiment, this commissioner was the judge Bohuszewicz.

In November, the regiment could number 400 men. By the end of December, it had over 200 men, including 37 appointed officers. On January 15, 1813, the regiment reached Warsaw with 155 soldiers and 204 horses.

== Regiment's commander ==
- Colonel Ksawery Obuchowicz – from July 13, 1812

== Uniforms ==
The 20th Regiment, stationed in Białystok, wore uniforms with navy blue lapels and a yellow piping.

In 1813, the regiment used uniforms with yellow lapels and crimson collars and sleeve lapels, as well as uniforms made of green cloth (perhaps obtained in Russian warehouses).

== Bibliography ==
- Askenazy, Szymon; Gembarzewski (2003). Wojsko Polskie: Księstwo Warszawskie 1807–1814. Poznań: Wydawnictwo Kurpisz. ISBN 83-88841-47-5.
- Gembarzewski, Bronisław (1925). Rodowody pułków polskich i oddziałów równorzędnych od r. 1717 do r. 1831. Warszawa: Towarzystwo Wiedzy Wojskowej.
- Gepner, Stanisław (1960). Księstwo Warszawskie, 1812–1814, pułki jazdy wg akwareli R. Forthoffera. Ze zbiorów specjalnych Centralnej Biblioteki Wojskowej: Stanislaw Gepner.
- Minkiewicz, Jan (1985). Ułańskie dzieje. Londyn: VERITAS.
- Morawski, Ryszard; Paczuski (2009). Wojsko Księstwa Warszawskiego. Ułani, gwardie honorowe, pospolite ruszenie, żandarmeria konna. Warszawa. ISBN 978-83-61229-03-2.
- Żygulski jun., Zdzisław; Wielecki (1988). Polski mundur wojskowy. Kraków: Krajowa Agencja Wydawnicza. ISBN 83-03-01483-8.
