= 4th Mounted Rifle Regiment (Duchy of Warsaw) =

- 4 Pułk Strzelców Konnych (Polish)
- Active: 1806-1813
- Disbanded: 1813
- Country: Duchy of Warsaw
- Branch: Army
- Type: Cavalry
- Size: 1000 Soldiers (1807)
- Part of: 2nd Division; 16th Division - 1812; 4th Cavalry Division - 1812; Antoni Paweł Sulkowski Cavalry Division - 1813
- Engagements: French invasion of Russia; War of the Fourth Coalition; War of the Sixth Coalition

Commanders
- Notable commanders: Wojciech Męcińsk; Tadeusz Tyszkiewicz; Walenty Kwaśniewski; Stanisław Dulfus; Franciszek Fornalski; Rafał Zajączek

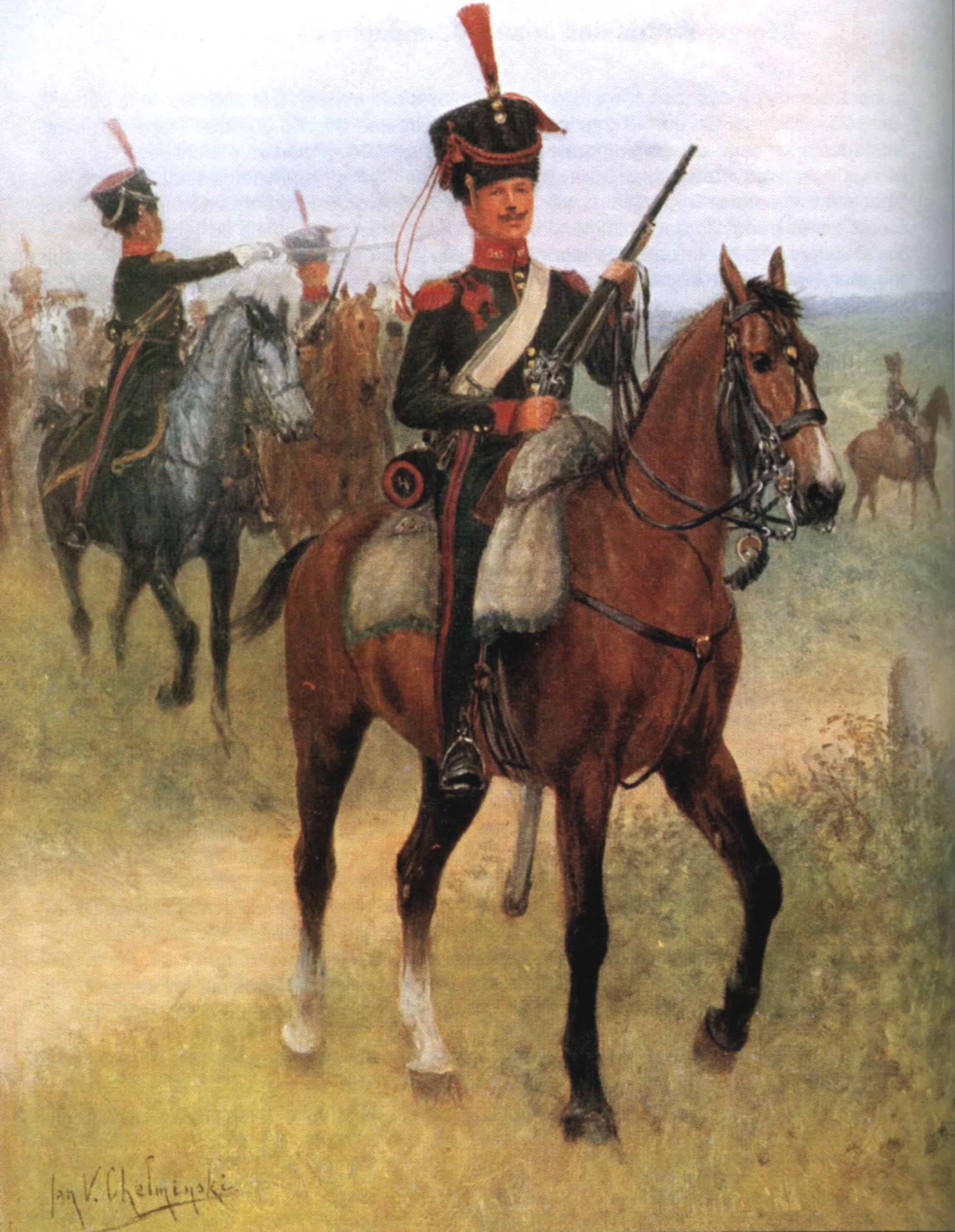
Officer of the 4th Mounted Rifle Regiment in a painting by Józef Chełmoński

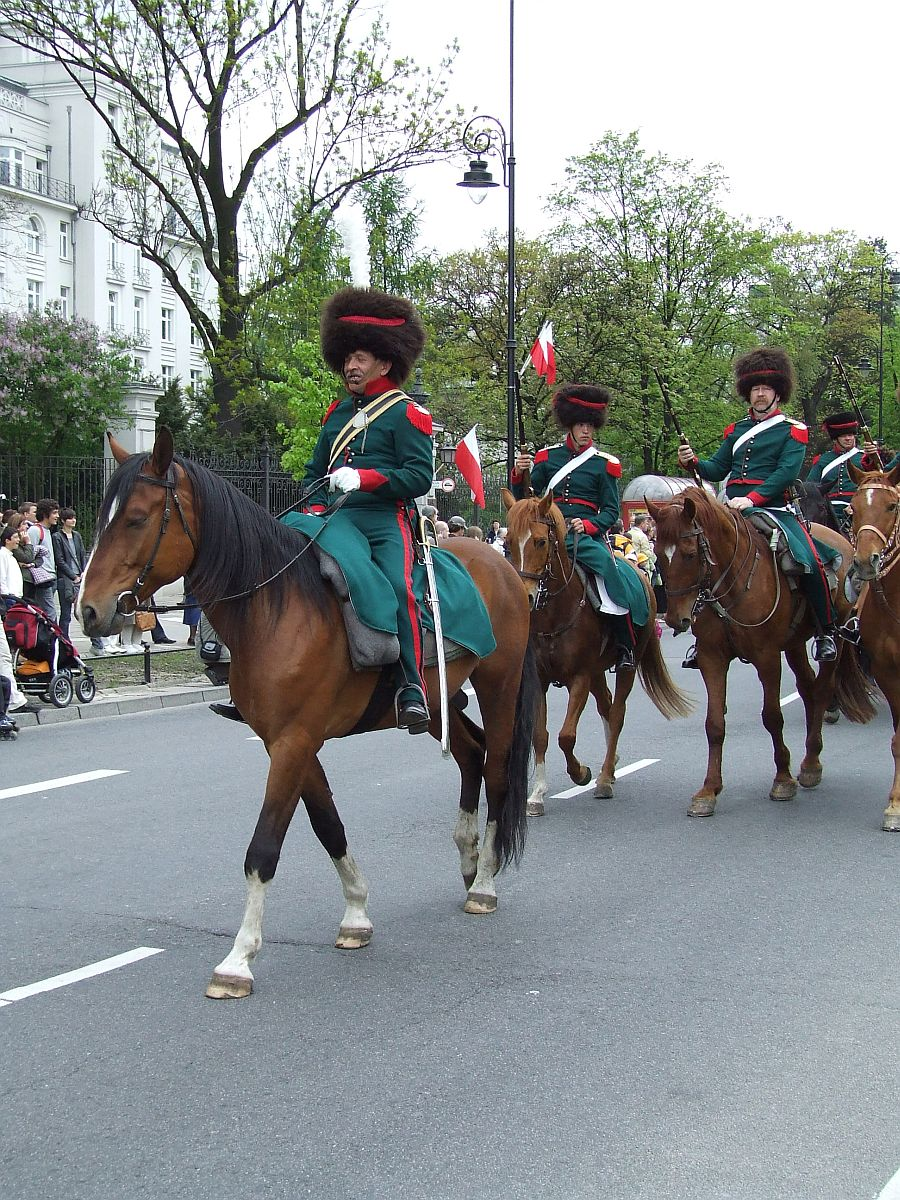
4th Regiment of Mounted Riflemen of the Duchy of Warsaw, reconstruction, 3rd of May parade, Royal Route

4th Mounted Rifle Regiment (Polish: 4 Pułk Strzelców Konnych) was a cavalry division of the Army of the Duchy of Warsaw.

== Regiment history ==
It was formed in 1806 together with the 14th Cuirassier regiment and the 15th Lancer regiment, it formed the left brigade commanded by General Benedykt Łączyński. After the end of combat operations, according to the order of 10 August 1807, the 4th regiment of mounted riflemen under Colonel Mięczyński garrisoned in Warta.

In July and September 1807 it had 1,000 men and 880 horses (soldiers and non-commissioned officers of the Greater Poland Uprising). It was stationed in Wielkopolska (successively: Warta, Sulmierzyce, Miechów, Odolanów, Świca, Bledzianów, Chynów).It took part in the campaign 1806/1807, 21 February to 29 July 1809 intended for fighting in Swedish Pomerania against the Prussian insurgent troops of Major Schill stationed in the Fortresses on the Oder: in Szczecin (regimental headquarters), Kostrzyn nad Odra (some squadrons) and in Głogów (other squadrons). In August it fought in northern Germany and the Kingdom of Westphalia against Schill and was stationed in Magdeburg.

On 1 September 1809 it reported to the command of the Governor of Dresden, Major-General Claude Carr de Saint-Cyr. At the end of 1809, the regiment numbered 687 soldiers.

The regimental colour was crimson.

== Battles and engagements ==
The regiment took part in battles during the War of the Fourth Coalition, the invasion of Russia in 1812 and the War of the Sixth Coalition.

Battles and skirmishes:

- Smoleńsk (17 August 1812)
- Borodino (5 and 7 September 1812)
- Czeryków (29 September 1812)
- Możajsk (24 October 1812)
- Berezyną (28 November 1812).
