= XIII Corps (Grande Armée) =

- Active: 1813–1814
- Country: First French Empire
- Branch: French Imperial Army
- Size: Corps
- Engagements: War of the Sixth Coalition

Commanders
- Notable commanders: Louis-Nicolas Davout

The XIII Corps of the Grande Armée was a French military unit that existed during the Napoleonic Wars. The corps was formed in the spring of 1813 and Marshal Louis-Nicolas Davout was appointed as its commander. The corps included three French infantry divisions and attached cavalry. During the German campaign, the XIII Corps was assigned to defend northern Germany. Accordingly, Davout seized Hamburg and prepared to defend it against the Allies. In September 1813, one brigade was defeated at the Battle of the Göhrde. After Emperor Napoleon I's decisive defeat at the Battle of Leipzig in October, the XIII Corps became isolated in Hamburg. An Allied army under Russian General Count von Bennigsen initiated the Siege of Hamburg in December.

== Order of battle ==
=== Hamburg, 1814 ===
XIII Corps: Marshal Louis-Nicolas Davout (40,000)

- 3rd Division: General of Division Louis Henri Loison
  - 15th Light Infantry Regiment
  - 44th Infantry Regiment
  - 48th IR
  - 108th IR
- 40th Division: General of Division Marc Nicolas Louis Pécheux
  - 33rd Light Infantry Regiment (2 battalions)
  - 30th IR (2 battalions)
  - 61st IR (2 battalions)
  - 111th IR (2 battalions)
- 50th Division: General of Division Paul Thiébault
  - 24th Light Infantry Regiment (2 battalions)
  - 3rd IR (2 battalions)
  - 29th IR (2 battalions)
  - 105th IR (2 battalions)
- Danish Auxiliary Division: General Prince Prince Frederik of Hesse
- Avant Garde Brigade: Prince Frederik of Hesse
  - II / Schleswig Jäger Corps
  - I, II / Holstein Sharpshooter Corps
  - I / 3rd (Jutland) Infantry Regiment
  - Holstein Heavy Cavalry Regiment (4 squadrons)
  - 17th Lithuanian Uhlan Regiment (2 squadrons)
  - 6pdr Foot Battery von Gerstenberg (8 guns)
- 1st Brigade: General Graf Schulenburg
  - I, IV / Oldenburg Infantry Regiment
  - 3 Companies of II / Oldenburg Infantry Regiment
  - III, IV / Holstein Infantry Regiment
  - II, VI / Danish Hussar Regiment
  - 3pdr Foot Battery von Gonner (8 guns)
  - 6pdr Foot Battery Koye (8 guns)
- 2nd Brigade General Christian Friedrich Abercron
  - I, II / Funen Infantry Regiment
  - I, II / Schleswig Infantry Regiment
  - Funen Light Dragoon Regiment (3 squadrons)
  - 6pdr Foot Battery Friis (10 guns)
- Cavalry Brigade:
  - 28th Chasseurs-à-Cheval Regiment
  - 17th Lithuanian Uhlan Regiment
- Other infantry elements:
  - 26th Light, 18th, 93rd, and 155th Infantry Regiments
- Other cavalry elements:
  - 4th, 8th, and 15th Cuirassier and 13th and 20th Dragoon Regiments
  - 5th Hussar and 2nd and 25th Chasseurs-à-Cheval Regiments

Source: Smith, Digby (1998). The Napoleonic Wars Data Book. London: Greenhill. p. 526. ISBN 1-85367-276-9.
