= 2nd Division (Duchy of Warsaw) =

- 2 Dywizja (Polish)
- Active: 1808
- Country: Duchy of Warsaw
- Type: Infantry, Cavalry and artillery unit
- Colors: all panelling crimson buttons white.
- Engagements: French invasion of Russia

Commanders
- Notable commanders: Józef Zajączek

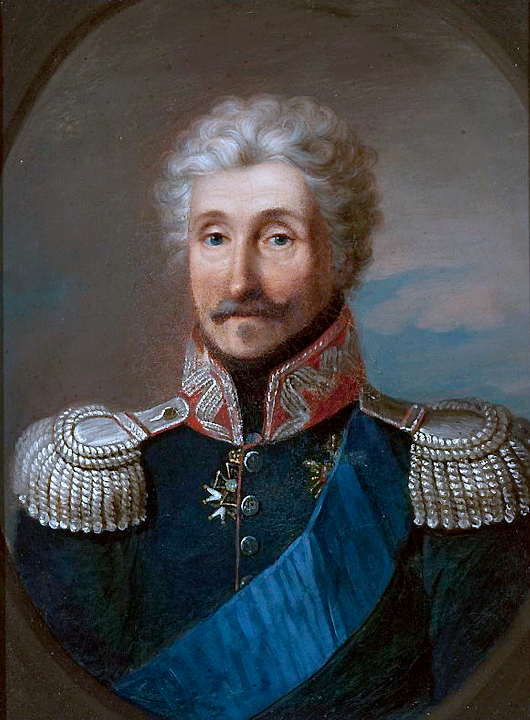
Gen. Józef Zajączek

The 2nd Division (Polish: 2 Dywizja) was a division of the Army of the Duchy of Warsaw, formed in 1807 in Kalisz as Legia Kaliska under the command of General Józef Zajączek.

== Formation and organisational changes ==
From 26 January 1807 it functioned as the Legia Kaliska (English: Legion of Kalisz). In organising it, eight battalions were formed in the department of Kalisz and four from troops arriving from France (the Northern Legions). Subsequently, the number of battalions was reduced to eight.

On 4 June 1807, Minister of War Jozef Poniatowski issued an order introducing new unit numbering, but its regiments retained their previous numbers from 5 to 8. In July 1808, the Legion was reorganised and the 2nd Division was formed. Its commander was the former commander of the Kalisz Legion, General Józef Zajączek, and the division's staff included Stanisław Malczewski. In August 1808, the 2nd Division was reviewed by Marshal Louis Nicolas Davout.

== Division command ==
- Commander– Lt. Gen. Józef Zajączek
- Major – Brig. Gen.. Paweł Skórzewski
- Chief of staff – Col. Ksawery Kossecki
- Infantry commander – Lt. Gen Izydor Krasiński
- Cavalry commander – Lt. Gen. Józef Niemojewski
- Warcommissioner – Deleymere
- Commander's adjutant – Col. Aleksander Radzimiński
- Chief health officer – Karol August Szultz

== Structural organisation ==
Composition in mid 1808:

- 5th infantry regiment
- 6th infantry regiment
- 7th infantry regiment
- 8th infantry regiment
- 4th Mounted Rifle Regiment
- 3rd Uhlan regiment
- 2nd infantry artillery battalion
