= Battle of Radzymin =

Battle of Radzymin may refer to the following battles fought in the vicinity of the town of Radzymin, a suburb of Warsaw, Poland:

- Battle of Radzymin (1809), a Polish-Austrian battle following the Battle of Raszyn
- Battle of Radzymin (1920), a major clash and a part of the Battle of Warsaw during the Polish-Soviet War
- Battle of Radzymin (1944), a tank battle between Nazi Germany and Soviet Union during the opening stages of the Warsaw Uprising
