= 9th Uhlan Regiment (Duchy of Warsaw) =

- 9 Pułk Ułanów; 3 Pułk Jazdy Galicyjsko-Francuskiej
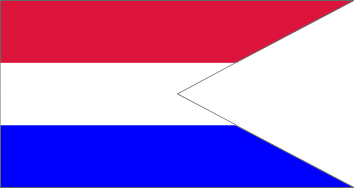
- Lance pennant
- Active: 1809-1813
- Disbanded: 1813
- Allegiance: Duchy of Warsaw
- Branch: Army of the Duchy of Warsaw
- Type: Uhlan
- Size: 936 soldiers (1809)
- Part of: Gdańsk Division
- Garrison/HQ: Konin

The 9th Uhlan Regiment (Polish: 9 Pułk Ułanów)– was an Uhlan regiment of army of the Duchy of Warsaw.

== Regiment history ==
The regiment was formed in 1809 in Greater Poland in the Duchy of Warsaw from the cadre of the 6th Regiment brought from Chełmno by Jan Henryk Dąbrowski and from two new squadrons formed in the Kalisz department on the basis of the 4th Regiment. At the end of July, it was also reinforced by a Kuyavian cavalry unit led by squadron commander Modliński. At the start of the regiments history the regiment was stationed at Konin. At the start of the regiments history the regiment was stationed at Konin. At the end of 1809, the regiment had 936 soldiers.

Until September of 1809, the regiment was counted among the mounted riflemen and served as part of the Jazda Poznańska (English:Poznań Cavalry) and until the 28th of December 1809 the regiment was called The 3rd Galician-French Cavalry Regiment (Polish: 3 Pułkiem Jazdy Galicyjsko-Francuskiej). It was part of the Gdańsk Division.

== Uniform ==
In 1809, until September, serving as a regiment of mounted riflemen, the regiment wore green uniforms with black lapels.

From 1810, the following uniform colours were in force:

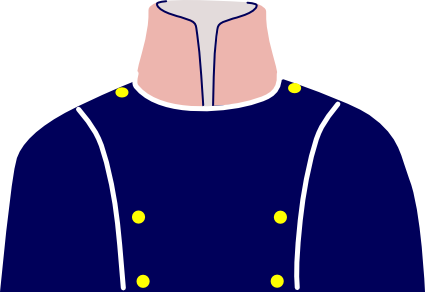
Crimson collar with navy blue trim; navy blue lapels with white trim.

Navy blue sleeve cuffs with white piping

- Navy blue lapels with white piping

== Regiment commanders ==
The regimental commanders of this regiment were:

- Col. Feliks Przyszychowski (8 August 1809)
- Col. Jan Maksymilian Fredro (18 January 1813).

== Battles ==
The 3rd Uhlan regiment took part in the French invasion of Russia and War of the Sixth Coalition.

Battles and skrimishes:

| Battles and skirmishes | Date |
|---|---|
| Oshmyany | 30 June 1812 |
| Vileika | July 1812 |
| Ljady | 13 August 1812 |
| Krasne | 15 August 1812 |
| Smolensk | 17 August 1812 |
| Vyazma | 29 August 1812 |
| Yelnia | 5 September 1812 |
| Borodino | 7 September 1812 |
| Cherikov | 29 September 1812 |
| Tarutina | 4 October 1812 |
| Maloyaroslavets | 24 October 1812 |
| Berezina | 28 November 1812 |
| Defence of Gdańsk | 1813 |

== See also ==
- Army of the Duchy of Warsaw
