= 8th Uhlan Regiment (Duchy of Warsaw) =

- 8 Pułk Ułanów, 2 Pułk Jazdy Galicyjsko-Francuskiej(Polish)
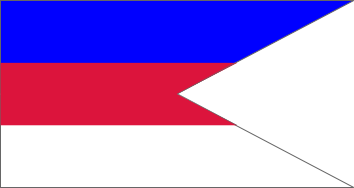
- Lance Pennant
- Active: 1809-1813
- Country: Duchy of Warsaw
- Branch: Army
- Type: Cavalry
- Size: 954 soldiers (1809)
- Part of: Cavalry Division of Antoni Paweł Sulkowski - 1813
- Engagements: Austro-Polish War; French invasion of Russia; War of the Sixth Coalition

Commanders
- Notable commanders: Col. Antoni Potocki; Col. Stanisław Dulfus, Col. Kazimierz Rozwadowski; Col. Dominik Hieronim Radziwiłł; Col. Józef Sokolnicki

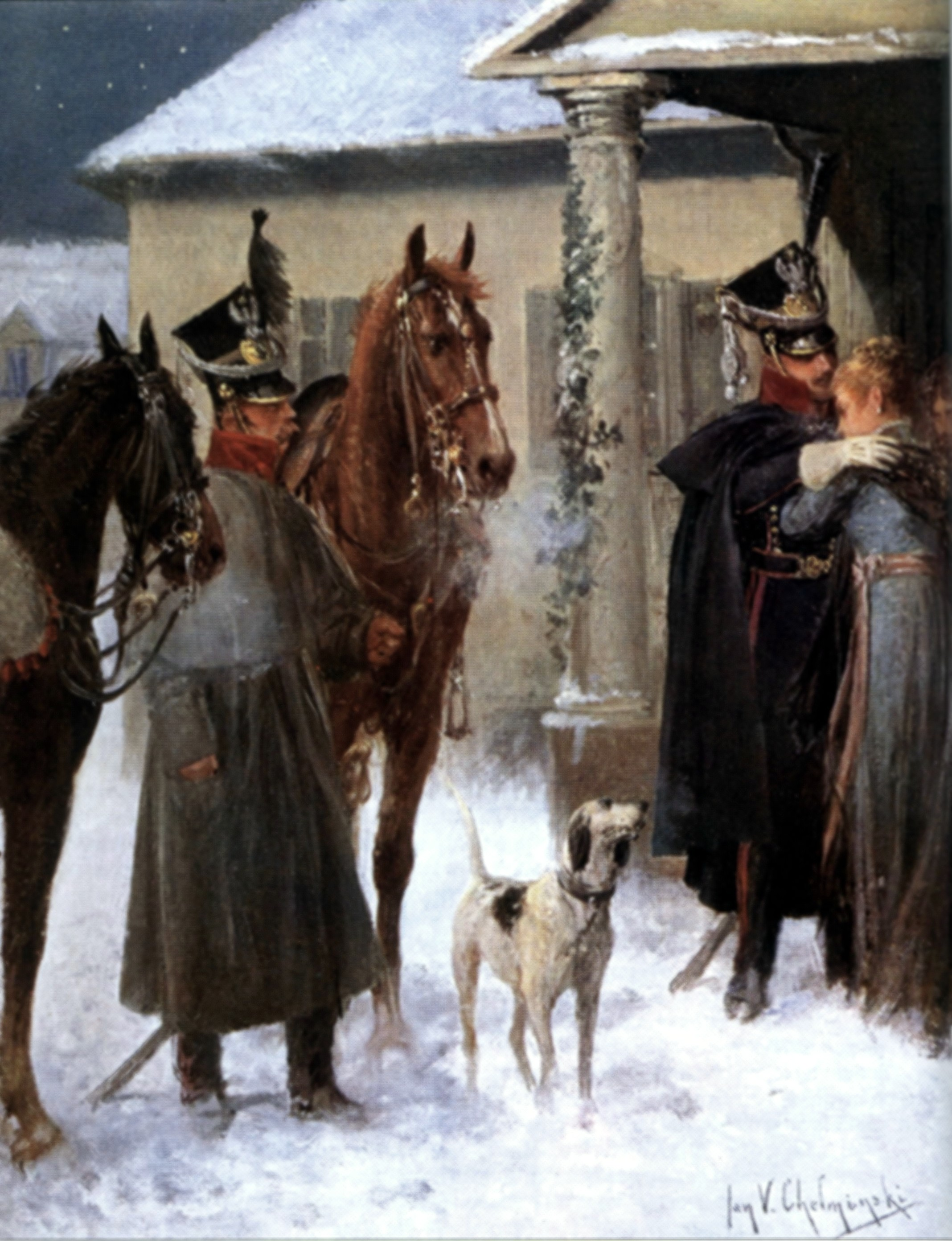
A painting of the 8th Uhlan Regiment

The 8th Uhlan Regiment (Polish: 8 Pułk Ułanów) was Polish cavalry division of the Duchy of Warsaw Army.

The regiment formed in 1809 in the Galician Podolia region. Until 28 December 1809, it was called the 2 Pułkiem Jazdy Galicyjsko-Francuskiej (English: 2nd Galician-French Cavalry Regiment). By the end of 1809, the regiment had 954 soldiers.

== Uniform ==
From 1810 the following colour of uniform was in force:

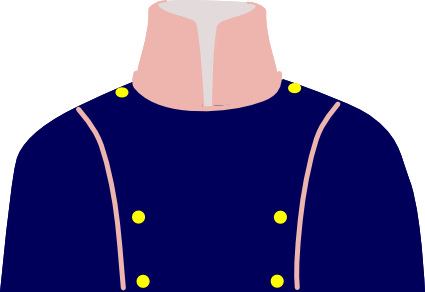

Mottled collar; navy blue rebates.

Sleeve lining in mottled blue.

Trouser Lampasse in purple.

== Battles and engagements ==
The regiment took part in battles during the Polish-Austrian War, the invasion of Russia in 1812 and the War of the Sixth Coalition.

Battles and skirmishes:

Battles and Skirmishes	Date
Rożniszewo	6 June 1809
Jedlińsk	9 June 1809
Chorostków	10 July 1809
Grzymałowo, Zaleszczyki, Tarnopol	15 July 1809
Wieniawka	16 and 17 July 1809
Ostrowno	26 July 1812
Vitebsk	26–27 July 1812
Smoleńsk	16–18 August 1812
Valutino	19 August 1812
Borodino	7 September 1812
Woronowo	2 October 1812
Tarulina	4 October 1812
Neustadt	15 October 1813
Leipzig	16 October 1813

== See also ==
- Army of the Duchy of Warsaw
