= Denisko uprising =

1797 Polish rebellion

Denisko Uprising
- Part of the Partitions of Poland
Date	26 June 1797 – end of July 1797
Location	Pokucie, Podole and Bukowina, Austrian Poland. (modern day Ukraine)
Result	Austrian victory

Belligerents
(Poland) Polish insurgents Support: Ottoman Empire; French First Republic; Kingdom of Great Britain	Austrian Empire: Kingdom of Galicia and Lodomeria; Bukovina District

Commanders and leaders
Joachim Denisko; Julian Sierawski	Various

Strength
~200 insurgents	Unknown

The Denisko uprising (Polish: Insurekcja Deniski), named after Joachim Denisko, was the first Polish rebellion after the failed Kosciuszko Uprising. It took place in late June 1797 in the regions of Pokucie and Podole, which after the Partitions of Poland became part of Austrian Galicia.

Joachim Mokosiej Denisko was born in c. 1756, in a Polish szlachta family of Volhynia. A Jacobin, he took part in the Kosciuszko Uprising, as a political and military commandant of the County of Krzemieniec. In 1794, he carried out a failed rebel raid on Volhynia, after which he fled to the Ottoman Empire, a traditional enemy of the Russian Empire. While in Turkey, Denisko worked on another rebellion, cooperating with a patriotic organization from Lwów, Centralizacja Lwowska.

Centralizacja Lwowska was founded in January 1796 in Kraków, but soon afterwards its office was moved to Lwów. Its members were mainly rich landowners from Austrian and Russian occupied parts of Poland, with bulk of them living in Galicia. Centralizacja also had members in Volhynia and former Grand Duchy of Lithuania: its target was a general insurrection, with support of Turkey and revolutionary France. The organization was commanded by Walerian Dzieduszycki, while Joachim Denisko was one of key members.

First Polish military units were organized in Podole, Bukovina and Wallachia in 1795. Polish patriots hoped for an armed conflict between Russia and Turkey (see History of the Russo-Turkish wars), in which they supported the Ottomans. The number of Polish military personnel in northern provinces of the Ottoman Empire was about 1700; their camps were visited by French and English officers.

In early March 1797, a group of Polish officers created Zwiazek Wojskowy (Military Association), commanded by Joachim Denisko. An Act of Insurrection was published, in which the abolition of social divisions and serfdom was promised. Walerian Dzieduszycki was named military leader of the rebellion, while Karol Kniaziewicz became its civilian leader, and speaker of the National Assembly.

In May 1797, after an internal conflict, Denisko was forced to give up his post. Furthermore, as a result of activities of Russian intelligence services, several members of Centralizacja Lwowska were arrested, including Dzieduszycki. Despite these setbacks, on 26 June Denisko, with 200 supporters, crossed the Austrian - Turkish border near Zaleszczyki. Four days later, on 30 June, after the Battle of Debronowice (the only major battle of the uprising), Austrian forces destroyed the Polish detachment. Some Poles managed to return to Turkey; those captured were hanged on 11 July near Czerniowce. By the end of July, all Polish military camps were destroyed.

Denisko himself fled to Turkey. In 1798 he returned to Volhynia, after the Russian government declared an amnesty. He died in 1812 in Saint Petersburg.

== See also ==
- Partitions of Poland
- French Revolutionary and Napoleonic Wars
- Austrian Poland

== Sources ==
- Kronika powstań polskich 1794–1944, Wydawnictwo Kronika, Warsaw, ISBN 83-86079-02-9, pp. 57–58.
- Marian Kukiel, Próby powstańcze po trzecim rozbiorze, (reprint:) Kurpisz Poznań 2006 (oryginał: W. L. Anczyca i Spółki Kraków i Warszawa 1912), p. 225.
