= 17th Lithuanian Uhlan Regiment =

Cavalry regiment of the army of the Duchy of Warsaw

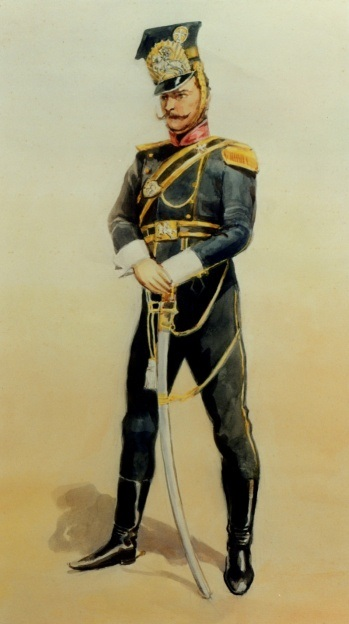
- A regimental officer in 1813
- Active: 5 July 1812 – 1814
- Country: Duchy of Warsaw
- Branch: Army of the Duchy of Warsaw
- Type: Cavalry
- Role: Light cavalry
- Headquarters: Kupiškis
- Engagements: Napoleonic Wars

Commanders
- Notable commanders: Michał Tyszkiewicz

The 17th Lithuanian Uhlan Regiment (Lithuanian: 17-asis ulonų pulkas; Polish: 17. pułk ułanów) was an uhlan regiment of the Army of the Duchy of Warsaw. Raised in 1812, the regiment served in the French invasion of Russia and War of the Sixth Coalition before being disbanded in 1814.

== 1812 ==
=== Formation ===
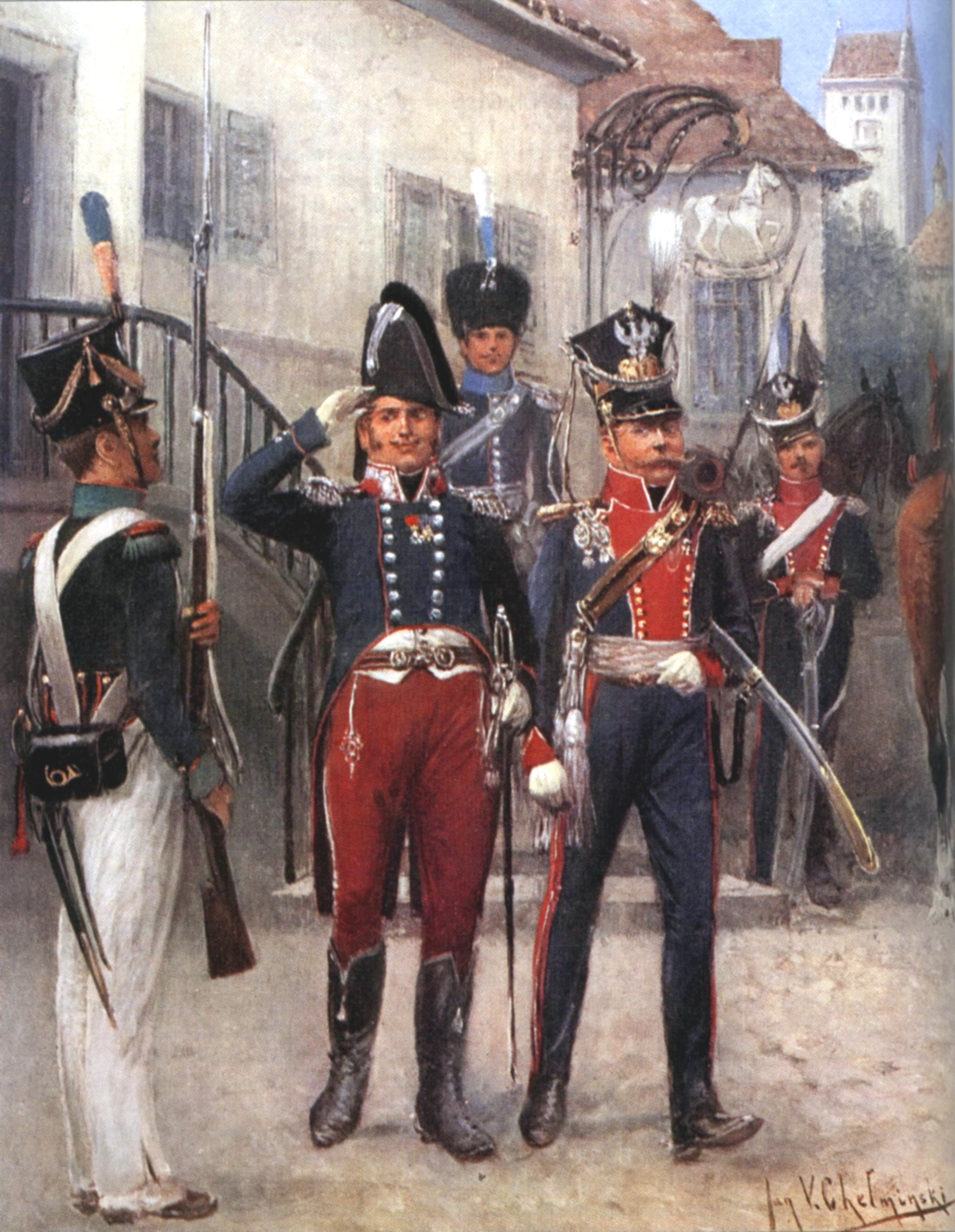
A regimental colonel and private (fourth and fifth from left)

Due to a lack of funds, Napoleon appealed to the Lithuanian nobility, especially the aristocracy, urging them to raise troops at their own expense. Michał Tyszkiewicz donated 76,137 złotys and 7.5 groszes, one-sixth of the uniform costs, and was therefore appointed commander of the regiment. Tyszkiewicz, however, was an experienced soldier, having previously served as a rotmistrz in the 2nd Lithuanian National Cavalry Brigade and as a captain in a Russian Hussar Regiment. On 5 July 1812, Tyszkiewicz began forming the Uhlan regiment. On August 12, he received an order from the head of the Military Commission, Prince Aleksander Sapieha, to begin recruiting soldiers.

The men who joined the regiment came from the towns of Biržai, Raseiniai, Telšiai, Panevėžys and their respective surroundings. The regimental headquarters were in Kupiškis. Napoleon appointed Count Michał Tyszkiewicz as the regiment's commander and awarded him the rank of colonel. The regiment, like other Lithuanian regiments, retained the numbering continuity of the cavalry regiments of the Duchy of Warsaw.

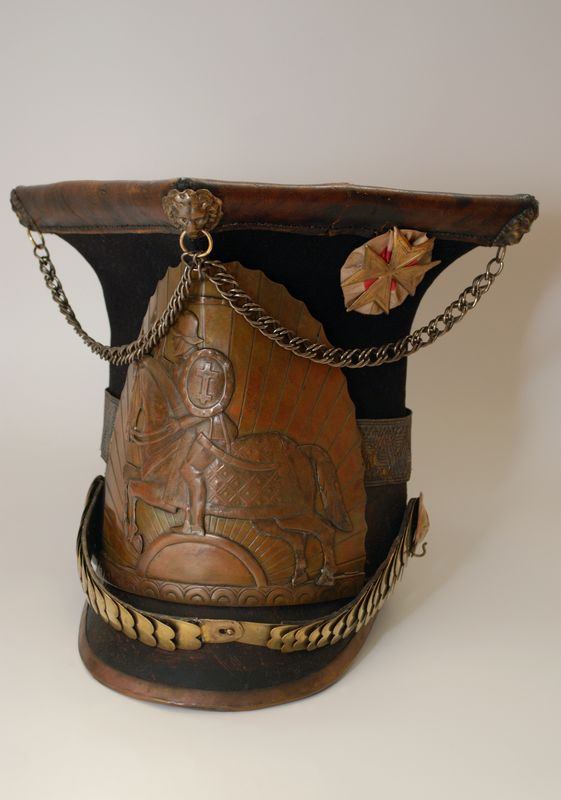
The 17th Uhlan Regiment's soldiers czapka. From the collection of Vytautas the Great War Museum in Kaunas.

=== Winter ===
At the end of 1812, together with other Lithuanian units, this regiment covered the Grande Armée's retreat and joined the X Corps. In December 1812, the 17th Uhlan Regiment retreated through Tauragė to Königsberg.

== War of the Sixth Coalition ==
=== 1813 ===
On 19 January 1813, the regiment had 829 uhlans and was stationing in Elbing. Later it was moved to Wielkopolska and was stationing in Skiwerzyna and Międzychód, when it joined the remnants of the French army commanded by the Viceroy Eugène de Beauharnais. On February 4, it fought near Brandenburg.

On February 11 or 12, the 17th Uhlan Regiment fought together with the 19th Lithuanian Uhlan Regiment near Sieraków. There it was surprised and defeated by General Chernyshev's Russian vanguard. The general Prince Romuald Giedroyć, who commanded both Uhlan regiments, was taken prisoner. He was wounded during his capture. During the battle, the regiment lost 147 out of 585 men it had before.

After this battle, both regiments were attached to the division of the French General Gérard, belonging to the XIII Corps. Together with it, the regiment fought near Bremen, Hamburg, Lübeck.

On 20 April 1813, men from the 19th Regiment were drafted into the regiment, after 225 soldiers from the 19th Regiment were selected for the Imperial Guard. The 19th Regiment's former commander, Col. Konstanty Rajecki, became the new commander of the 17th Regiment.

17th Lithuanian Uhlan Regiment's strength on May 1, 1813
Place	Officers	Uhlans	Horses
Davout's I Corps Cavalry	37	404	494
Vandamme's Hamburg Division	18	200	250
Hanover Cavalry Depot	12	40	158
Total	67	644	902

The regiment fought its last battles in Denmark.

== 1814–1815 ==
After the abdication of Emperor Napoleon with the Treaty of Fontainebleau, the regiment was allowed to return to its homeland with weapons and flags.

Most of the dispersed soldiers who, taking advantage of the amnesty, declared loyalty to Emperor Alexander I, gathered in Siedlce. From there, they were transferred to Garwolin and Łowicz, where the regiment was disbanded in mid-February 1815.
