= 15th Uhlan Regiment (Duchy of Warsaw) =

15 Uhlan Regiment
- 15 Pułk Ułanów; 6 Pułk Jazdy Galicyjsko-Francuskiej
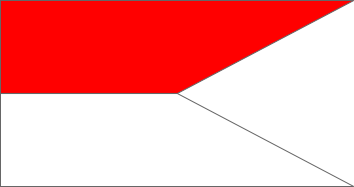
- Lance pennant
- Active: 1809-1813
- Disbanded: 1813
- Allegiance: Duchy of Warsaw
- Branch: Army of the Duchy of Warsaw
- Type: Uhlan
- Size: 916 soldiers (1809)
- Part of: Aleksander Rożniecki's Cavalry Division - 1812; 17th Division of Jan Henryk Dąbrowski - 1812 (Note: The regiments comprising the divisional cavalry brigade later formed Michał Ignacy Kamieński's 4th Cavalry Division.); Antoni Paweł Sułkowski's Cavalry Division - 1813
- Engagements: Polish-Austrian War; French invasion of Russia; Battle of Mir; Battle of Bereznia; War of the Sixth Coalition

Commanders
- Notable commanders: Augustyn Trzecieski; Józef Dwernicki; Ludwik Michał Pac

The 15 Uhlan Regiment (Polish: 15 Pułk Ułanów) – was an uhlan regiment in Army of the Duchy of Warsaw.

== Regimental history ==
15 Uhlan Regiment was formed in 1809 in Galician Podolia. Until the 28th December 1809 the regiment was called 6th Galician-French Cavalry Regiment (Polish:6 Pułkiem Jazdy Galicyjsko-Francuskiej). At the end of 1809 the regiment had 916 soldiers.

== Uniform ==
From 1810, the following uniform colours were in force:

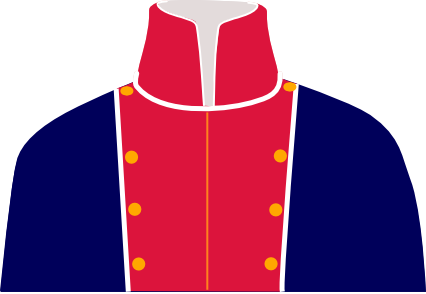
Crimson collar with white piping; crimson lapels with white piping.

Crimson sleeve cuffs with white piping

Crimson lampasses with white piping.

== Regimental commanders ==
The commanders of this regiment were:

- Col. Augustyn Trzecieski (5 June 1809)
- Squadron commander Józef Dwernicki (from 1810)
- Col. Ludwik Michał Pac (from 14 April 1812)

== Battles ==
The regiment took part in the Polish-Austrian War, French invasion of Russia and war of the Sixth Coalition.

Battles an skirmishes:

Battles and skirmishes	Date
Zaleszczyki	12, 15 and 18 June 1809
Tłuste	26 June 1809
Dyczkowo	4 July 1809
Ternopil	9 and 10 July 1809
Wieniawka	17 July 1809
Podhajce	18 July 1809
Mir	9 and 10 July 1812
Bobruisk, Robaczov	8 September 1812
Berezyna	28 November 1812
Kalisz	13 February 1813

== See also ==
- Battle of Mir
- Army of the Duchy of Warsaw
