= Kostrzyn =

Kostrzyn may refer to:

- Kostrzyn, Greater Poland Voivodeship, a town in Poland, seat of Gmina Kostrzyn
- Kostrzyn, Masovian Voivodeship, a village in east-central Poland
- Kostrzyn nad Odrą, a town in western Poland

== See also ==
- Gmina Kostrzyn
