= Battle of Radzymin (1809) =

1809 battle during the War of the Fifth Coalition

- Part of the Polish–Austrian War and War of the Fifth Coalition
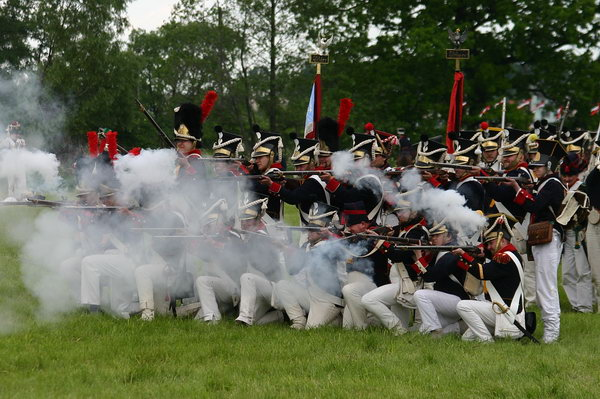
- Re-enactors in uniforms of Polish 1809 infantry
Date	25 April 1809
Location	Radzymin, Poland 52°25′0″N 21°11′0″E
Result	Polish victory

Belligerents
Duchy of Warsaw	Austrian Empire

Commanders and leaders
Jozef Poniatowski; Michał Sokolnicki; Jan Dąbrowski; Michal Kamienski; Jan Kanty Julian Sierawski	Johann Friedrich von Mohr

Strength
7,000; 4 guns	5,000; 14 guns

Casualties and losses
150–200	400

War of the Fifth Coalition:
Polish–Austrian War
The color black indicates the current battle.

The Battle of Radzymin took place on 25 April 1809, during the brief Polish–Austrian War. The battle occurred at Radzymin, some 20 kilometres (12 mi) north-east of Warsaw.

== Pre-battle ==
Following the Battle of Raszyn on 19 April, the Polish forces commanded by Prince Józef Poniatowski left Warsaw undefended and withdrew to several fortresses located nearby (most notably to Modlin Fortress and Serock). The Austrians seized the Polish capital on 23 April, but it was a pyrrhic victory, as the Austrian force was now seriously overstretched and had a still unbeaten enemy in the vicinity of Warsaw, as well as new Polish forces gathering strength behind their lines in Greater Poland. Prince Este garrisoned Warsaw with 10,000 soldiers, and split his remaining forces, sending some 6,000 troops under Gen. Johann Friedrich von Mohr to the right bank of the Vistula, and the rest towards Toruń and other targets on the left bank.

The borough of Praga, located right across the Vistula from Warsaw, was initially left in Polish hands, garrisoned by a small force of 600 men. Mohr's force crossed the river near Karczew and on 24 April besieged the small Polish garrison of Praga. However, the following day the besiegers were assaulted from the back by a Polish division-sized sortie from the Modlin Fortress under Gen. Michał Sokolnicki. In what became known as the Battle of Grochów, the spearhead of the Austrian force was defeated and the Poles withdrew successfully.

Simultaneously, further to the north-east, at Radzymin, a Polish force mounted yet another attack on overstretched Austrians. The town was held by relatively small Austrian forces consisting of the 2nd and 3rd Battalions from the 63rd Graf Baillet Infantry Regiment (under Ludwig Graf Baillet de Latour, younger brother of Field Marshal Maximilian Anton Karl, Count Baillet de Latour) and a detachment of hussars. The Polish force was similar in size and consisted of a squadron of uhlans under Capt. Piotr Strzyżewski and a single infantry battalion from the 6th Infantry Regiment under Jan Sierawski. The force was supported by a single 2-gun battery of mounted artillery.

== The Battle ==
Overnight on 24 April the Polish force left Serock and crossed the Narew, reaching Radzymin before daylight. In the early hours of 25 April the force attacked the town from two sides and commenced a synchronised attack. The Austrians withdrew to the town's centre, but soon their cavalry was forced to retreat and the infantry battalions were now isolated. After a brief close quarters fight, the two Austrian battalions with their remaining 37 officers surrendered.

== Result and aftermath ==
The losses for the Polish side were 19 killed and 27 wounded. The losses for the Austrians included approximately 2,000 prisoners of war and many killed and wounded. Although the battle was not a decisive defeat for the Austrians, it was one of a series of skirmishes they lost on the eastern bank of Vistula. Finally on 2 and 3 May the entire corps under Gen. Mohr was defeated at Ostrówek and its pontoon bridge across the river was destroyed, thwarting any further attempts to advance further east. This gave Poles enough time to leave the Austrians locked in Warsaw to their fate and liberate much of Galicia without much opposition from the enemy.
