= Army of the Duchy of Warsaw =

- Armia Księstwa Warszawskiego
- Active: 1807–1814
- Country: Duchy of Warsaw
- Allegiance: French First Empire
- Role: Armed forces of the Duchy of Warsaw

The Army of the Duchy of Warsaw (Polish: Armia Księstwa Warszawskiego) was raised in 1807 when the Duchy of Warsaw, a reconstitution of Poland as a French client state, was established. Troops of the Polish Legions formed the cadre of the army, which comprised almost 120,000 personnel at its height. The army fought in many of Napoleon's campaigns, including the Peninsular War, War of the Fifth Coalition, French invasion of Russia and War of the Sixth Coalition. In January 1813 virtually all of the Duchy of Warsaw fell under Russian and Prussian occupation, though units of the army continued to exist until Napoleon's first abdication in 1814.

== Size ==
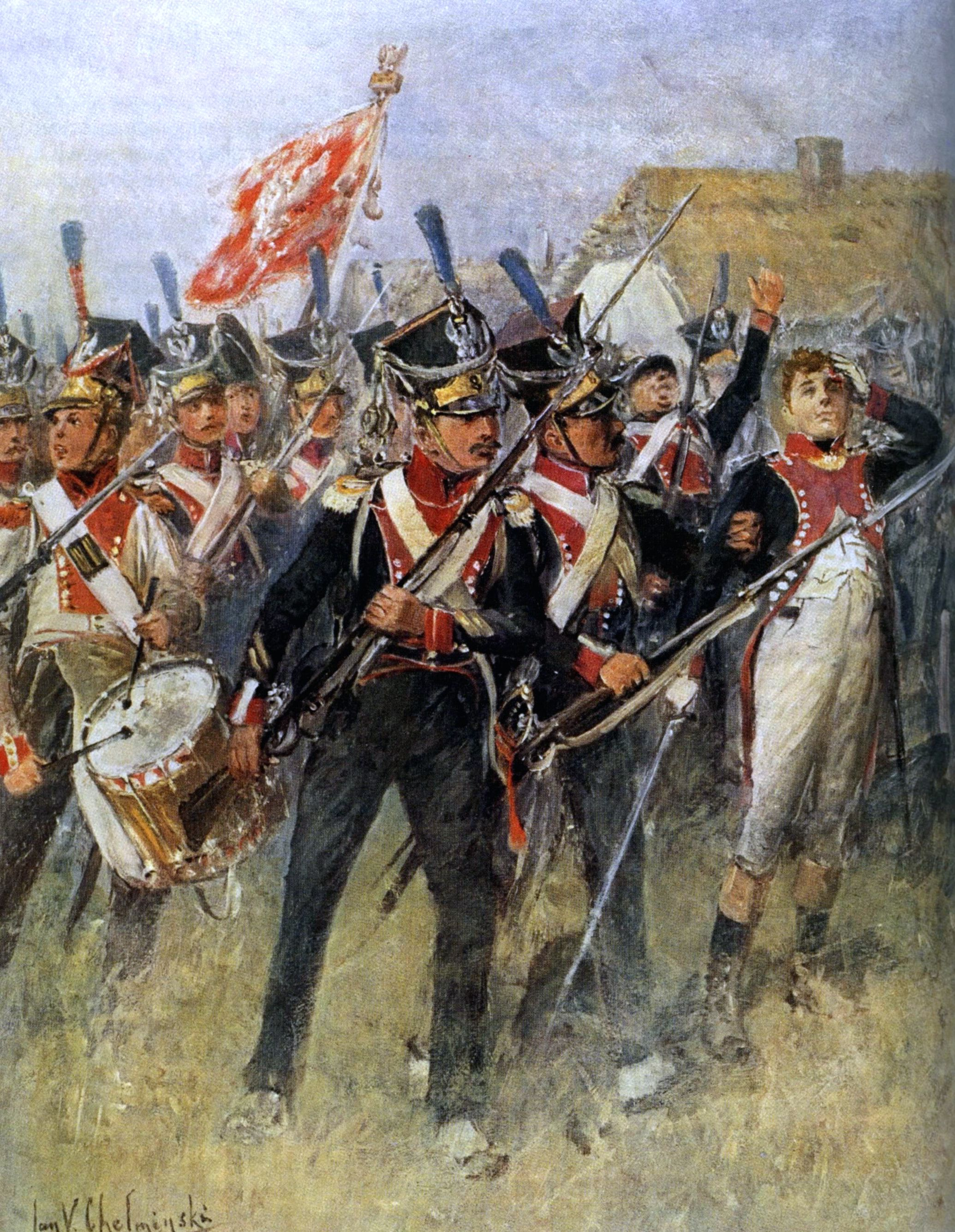
The 8th Infantry Regiment at the 1809 Battle of Raszyn

The cadre of the Army of the Duchy of Warsaw was formed by the legionnaires of the Polish Legions. In addition, it was filled by older soldiers from the military of the Polish–Lithuanian Commonwealth, who responded to the call to arms of Józef Poniatowski, and patriotic youth. In 1808, after the first emergency period was over, and the duchy felt more secure, those who wished to leave the army were given leave. The army was expanded with large waves of new recruits on the eve of new wars in 1809 and 1812, when the duchy fought other partitioners, which resulted in an influx of recruits from those territories, hoping to see their home liberated. The final recruitment phase was that in the fall and winter of 1813, when the duchy was trying to rally to its own defense in the aftermath of Napoleon's defeat in Russia.

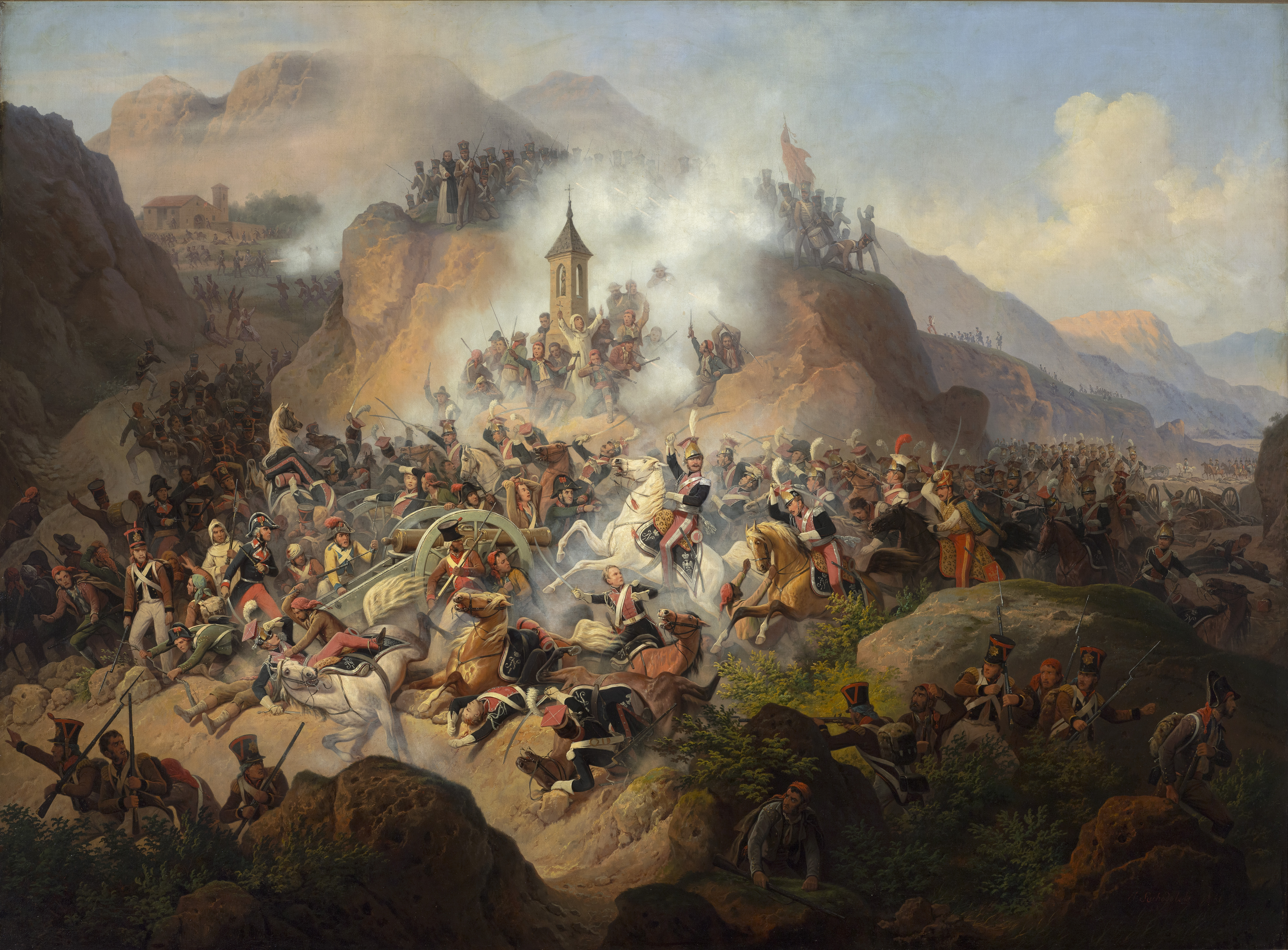
Charge of the Polish Light Horse of the Imperial Guard at Battle of Somosierra, 1808, by January Suchodolski

Upon its creation, the Army numbered 30,000 (out of the duchy's population of 2.6m). The size of the army was a considerable economic burden to the small state. The army was expanded several times; it was doubled in 1809. Several regiments were sponsored by the French. For the war of 1812, almost 100,000 men were fielded – more than the military of the Polish–Lithuanian Commonwealth ever numbered. In the fall of 1813, the Army, reconstructed after the defeat in Russia, numbered about 20,000 or 40,000 (sources vary).

It is estimated that about 180,000 to 200,000 men served in the Army throughout its brief existence.

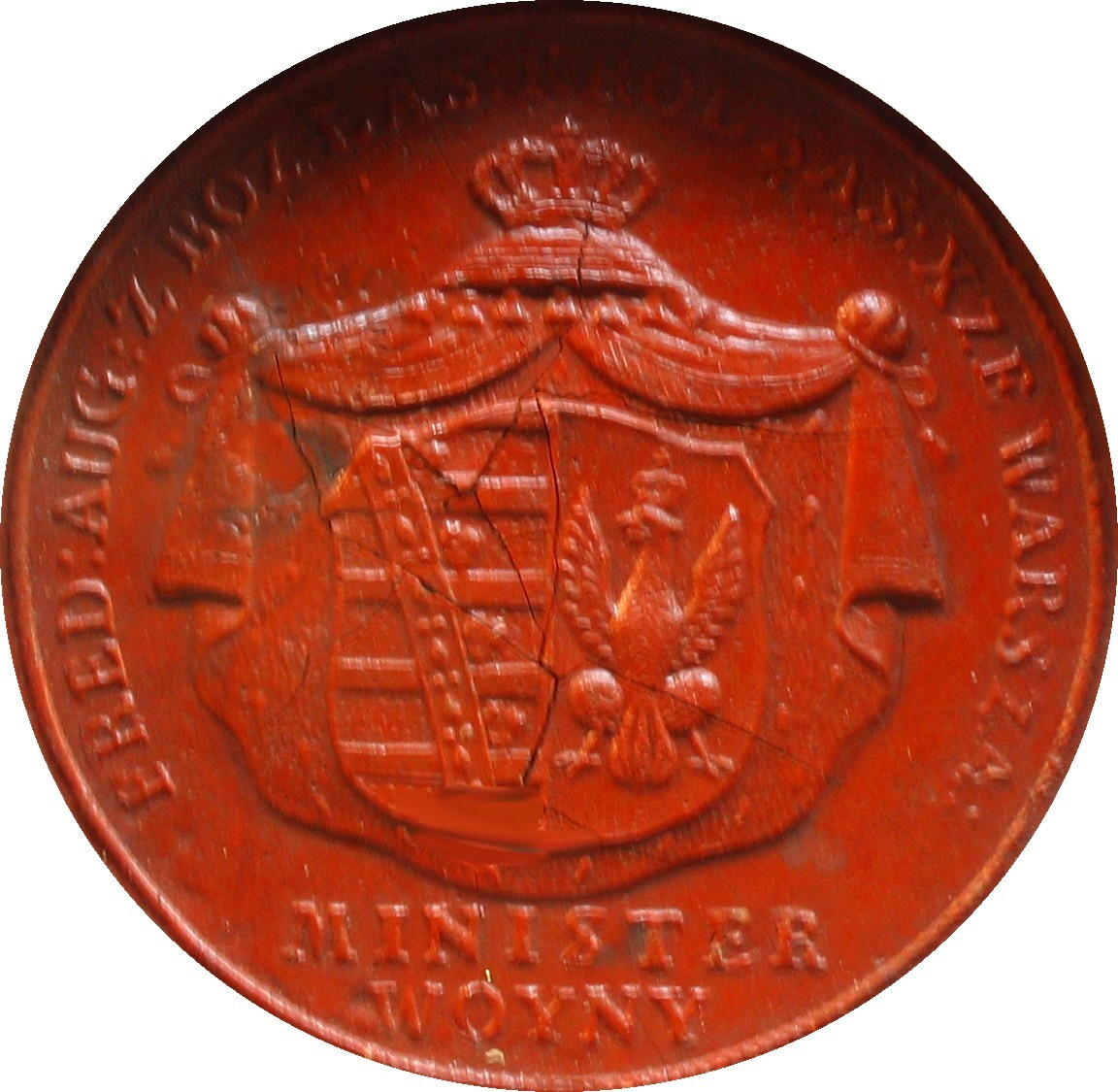
Seal of the Minister of War of the Duchy of Warsaw

In addition to the Army of the Duchy of Warsaw, Poles also served in other formations allied to France; most notably, the Vistula Legion. In addition to the standing army, a national guard could be called into action, as happened in 1809 and 1811.

Notable Polish commanders of the Army of the Duchy of Warsaw included Prince Józef Poniatowski (who was the army chief commander throughout most of its history) and Jan Henryk Dąbrowski.

== Composition ==
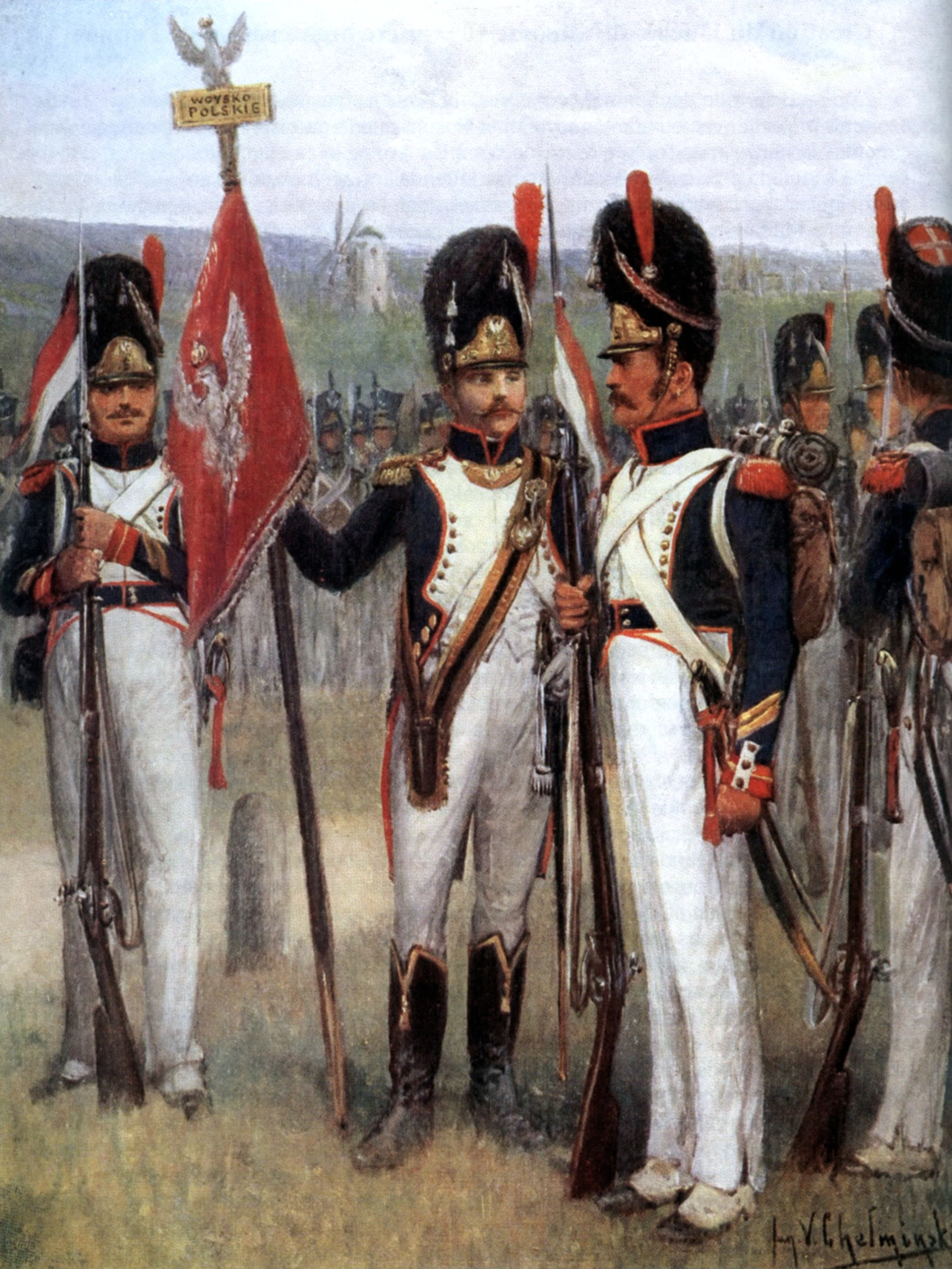
The 5th Infantry Regiment

The Army of the Duchy of Warsaw was composed of the following formations:

- one regiment of cuirassiers (14th)
- ten regiments of uhlan lancers (2nd, 3rd, 6th, 7th, 8th, 9th, 11th, 12th, 15th, 16th); five more were formed in Lithuania in 1812 (Which were the 17th, 18th, 19th, 20th and 21st Lithuanian Uhlan Regiments)
- two regiments of hussars (10th and 13th)
- three regiments of mounted chasseurs (1st, 4th and 5th)
- seventeen regiments of infantry (1st, 2nd, 3rd, 4th, 5th, 6th, 7th, 8th, 9th, 10th, 11th, 12th, 13th, 14th, 15th, 16th and 17th; five more were formed in Lithuania in 1812, which were the 18th, 19th, 20th, 21st and 22nd, as well as a Lithuanian Rifle Regiment)
- one regiment of horse artillery (composed of four companies)
- twenty five companies of regular artillery

In 1813 several units of light cavalry, the Krakusi (Cracus, or Polish cossacks), were planned; in the end, one regiment was formed.

== Culture, training and time of service ==
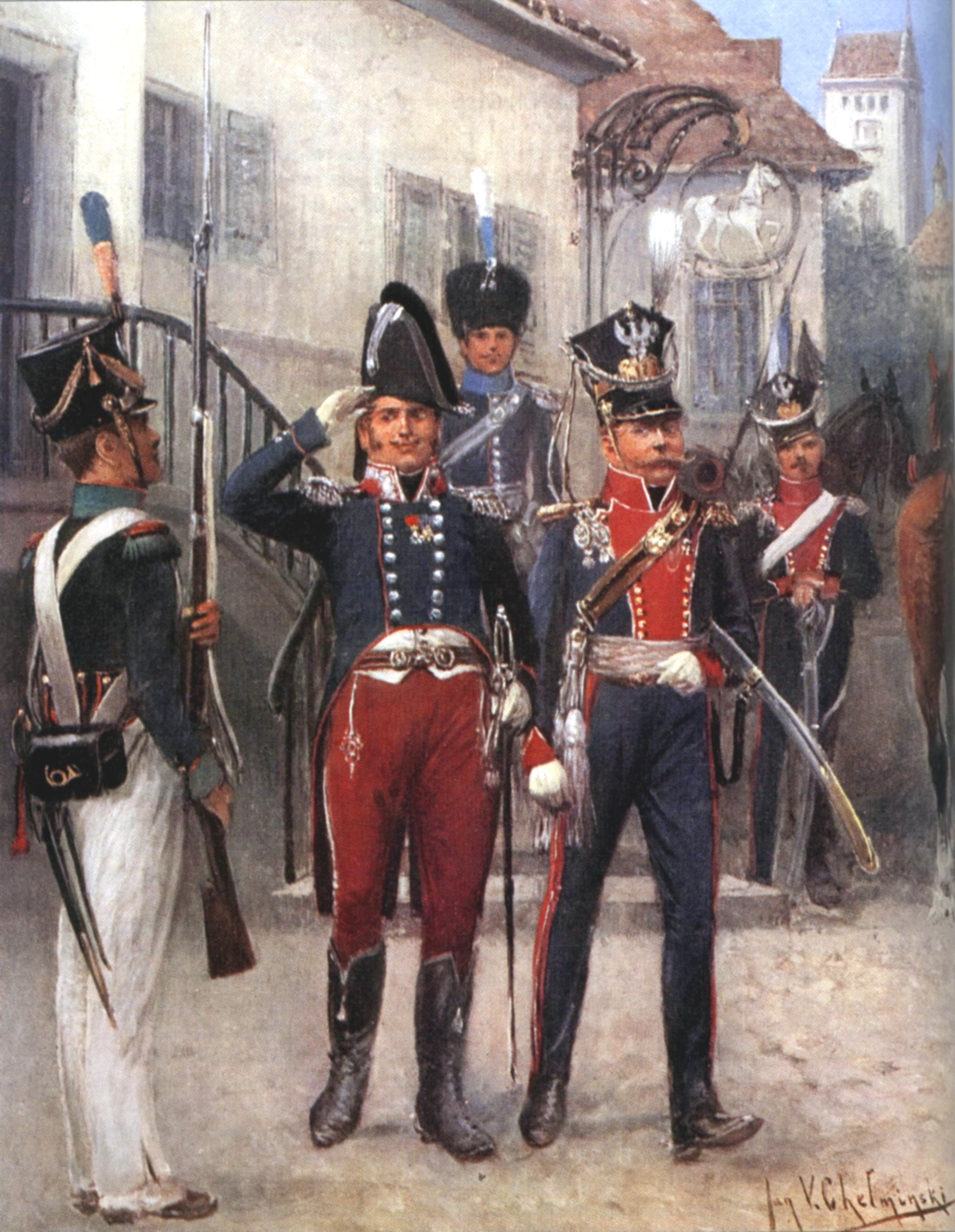
Brigade general and colonel of the 17th Lithuanian Uhlan Regiment

The Army was the site of a cultural clash of new, democratic French traditions and old Polish customs, with clashes on the role of nobility in the military – with some conservatives attempting to restrict the officer rank to the nobles. The French revolutionary and civic traditions, passed through veteran legionnaires, resulted in more motivation of the peasant recruits, compared to the army of the old Commonwealth. The educational role of the army is seen as one of its major if unintended successes. The army was also improved due to the modernization and adoption of modern French military rules and tactics. Overall, the era of the Duchy of Warsaw marked a period of modernization of the Polish Army, with a new military doctrine and science that was codified by Polish military scholar of that era, Ignacy Prądzyński.

The obligatory time of service was set at 6 years, with any citizens aged 21 to 28 having a chance to be randomly chosen for conscription. The Army was supported by the new schools, with the 3-year Elementary School and a 1-year Applicant School for Artillery and Engineering.

Overall, the Polish units were reckoned by the French to be highly motivated and of high quality.

== Operational history ==
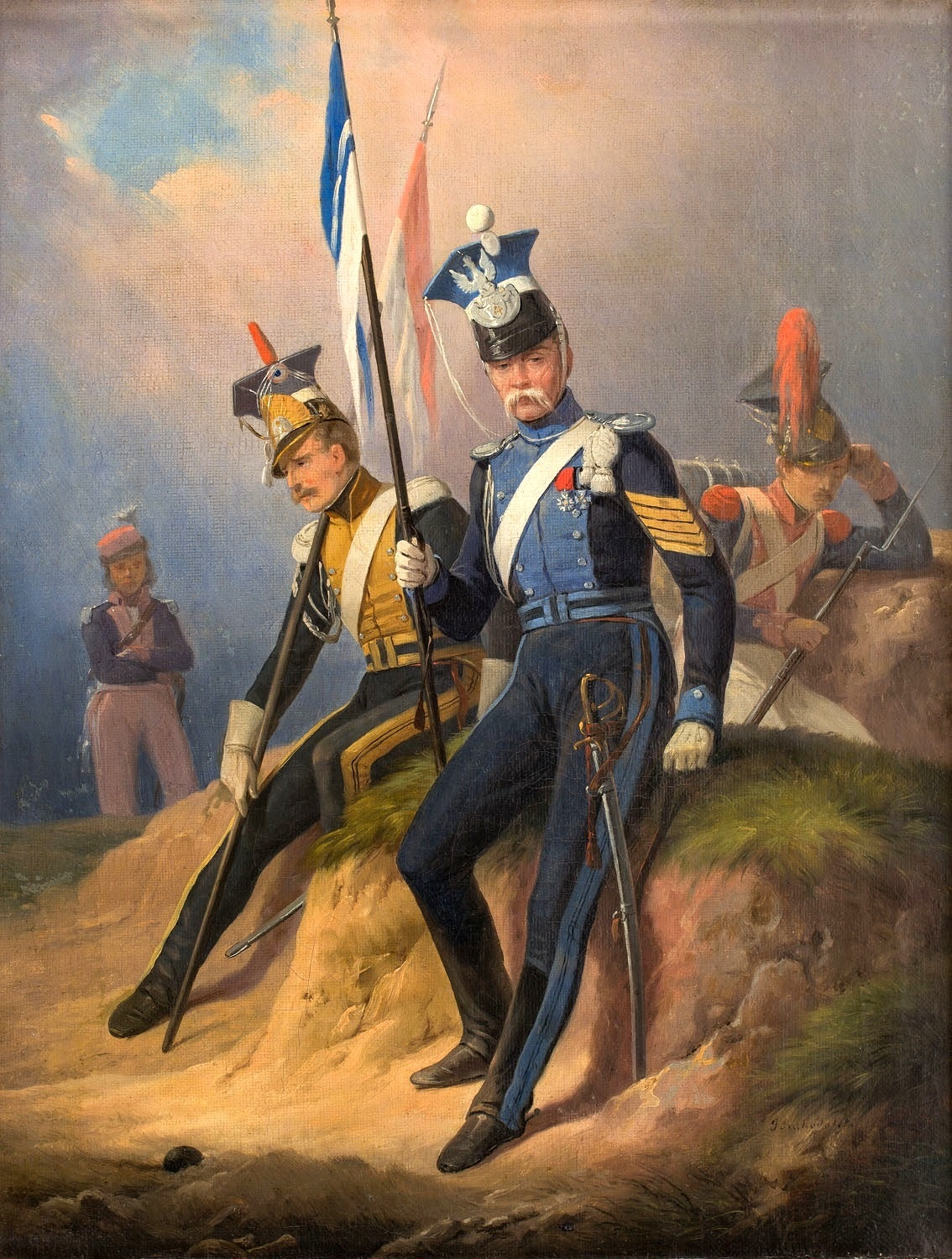
Uhlans of the army of the Duchy of Warsaw

The army was formed at the time of the creation of the Duchy of Warsaw in 1807. The army participated in numerous wars on the side of Napoleonic France, including in the War of the Fourth Coalition (1806–1807), Peninsular War, the War of the Fifth Coalition (primarily in the Polish–Austrian War) of 1809, and in the War of the Sixth Coalition (in particular, in the French invasion of Russia) of 1812–1813. In the Russian campaign of 1812, the Polish units formed an entire corps (the V Corps) of the Grande Armée. The army sustained over 70% losses. The Army suffered further heavy casualties in the Battle of Leipzig in 1813, where Prince Poniatowski died.

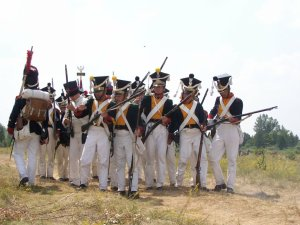
Modern-day reenactment (4th Infantry Regiment of the Duchy of Warsaw)

After Napoleonic defeats in 1813, the duchy was occupied by Napoleon's enemies. As several garrisons in fortresses held out, much of the Army followed Napoleon back to France that year. Disorganized after Poniatowski's death, in 1814, the army still had about 8,000 people in French-controlled territories, mostly in France, but was incorporated into the French Army, and ceased to exist after the defeat of Napoleon. After the Treaty of Fontainebleau most of the Polish soldiers were given into the custody of the Russians.

== See also ==
- Army of Congress Poland
- Military of the Polish–Lithuanian Commonwealth
- Polish Armed Forces
- Polish Armed Forces (Second Polish Republic)
- Polish Armed Forces in the East
- Anders' Army
- Polish Armed Forces in the West
- Polish People's Army
- Polish Legions in World War I
- First Polish Army (1944–1945)
- Polish Military Organisation
- Internal Military Service (WSW)
- Border Protection Forces (WOP)
- People's Army (Poland)
- People's Guard (1942–1944)
- National Armed Forces
- Home Army
- Union of Armed Struggle
- National Military Organization
- ORMO
- Territorial Defense Forces
