= 2nd Infantry Regiment (Duchy of Warsaw) =

- 2 Pułk Piechoty
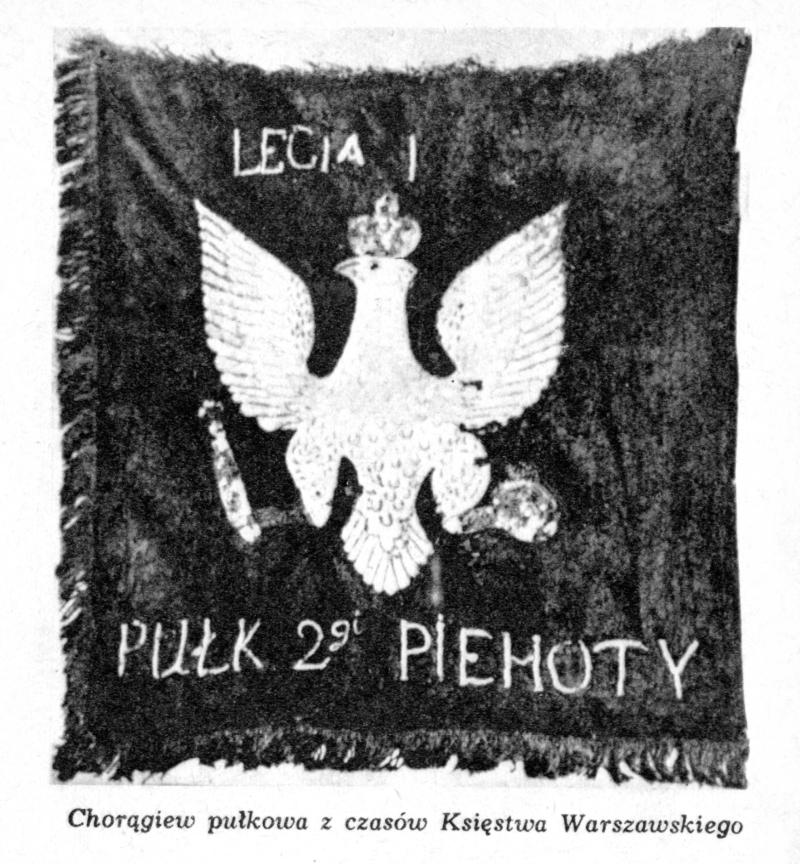
- Standard of the 2nd Infantry Regiment
- Active: 1806 - 1813
- Disbanded: 18 December 1813
- Allegiance: Duchy of Warsaw
- Branch: Army of the Duchy of Warsaw
- Type: Infantry
- Size: 2487 soldiers - 1810
- Part of: 1st Division; Ludwik Kamieniecki’s 18th Division - 1812; Dąbrowski's division - 1813
- Garrison/HQ: Modlin Fortress
- Engagements: Napoleonic Wars; War of the Fourth Coalition; Austro-Polish War; Battle of Raszyn; French invasion of Russia; Battle of Smolensk; Battle of Borodino; War of the Sixth Coalition; Battle of Leipzig

Commanders
- Notable commanders: Stanisław Florian Potocki; Jan Krukowiecki

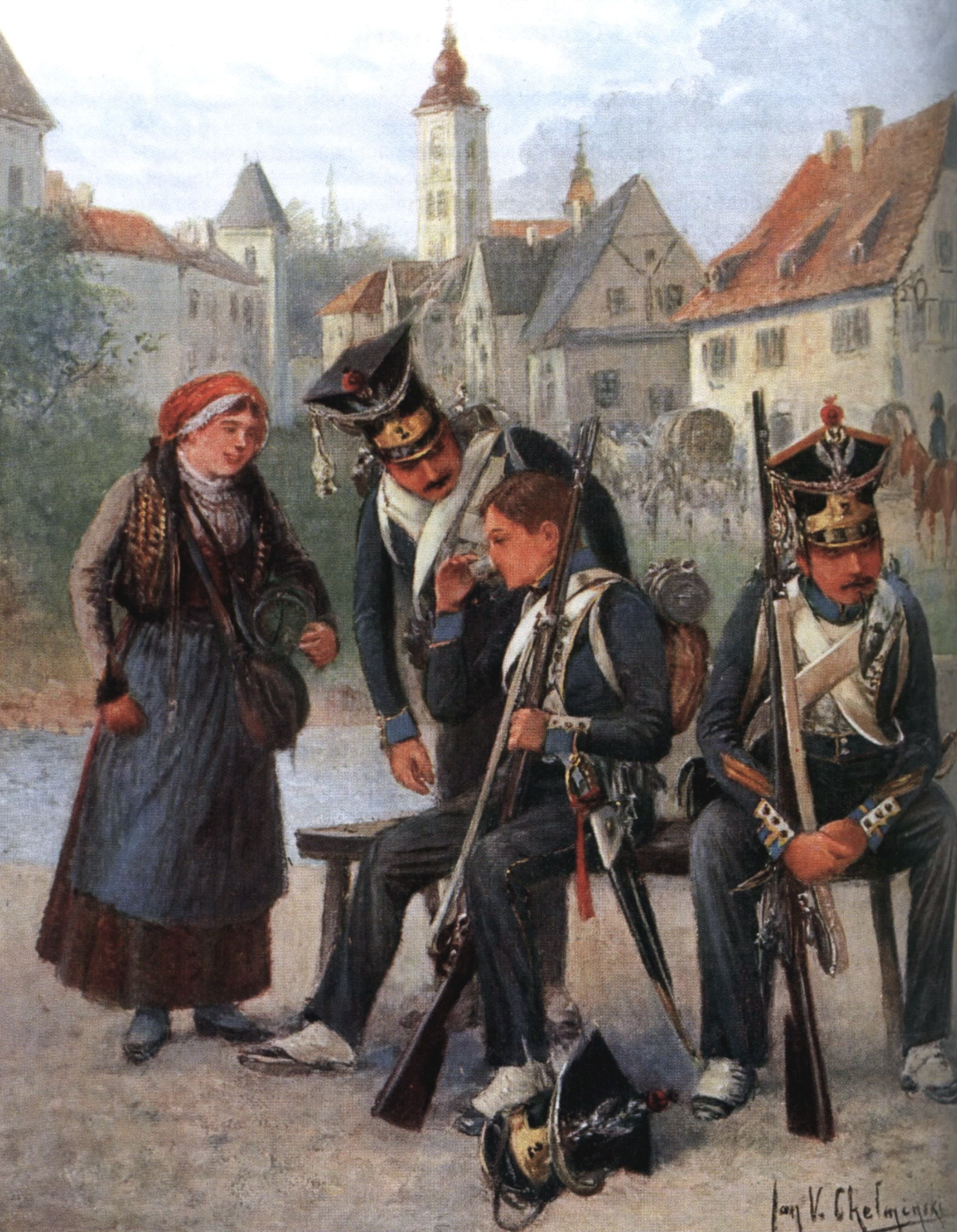
Painting of soldiers of the 2nd Infantry regiment by Jan Chełmiński

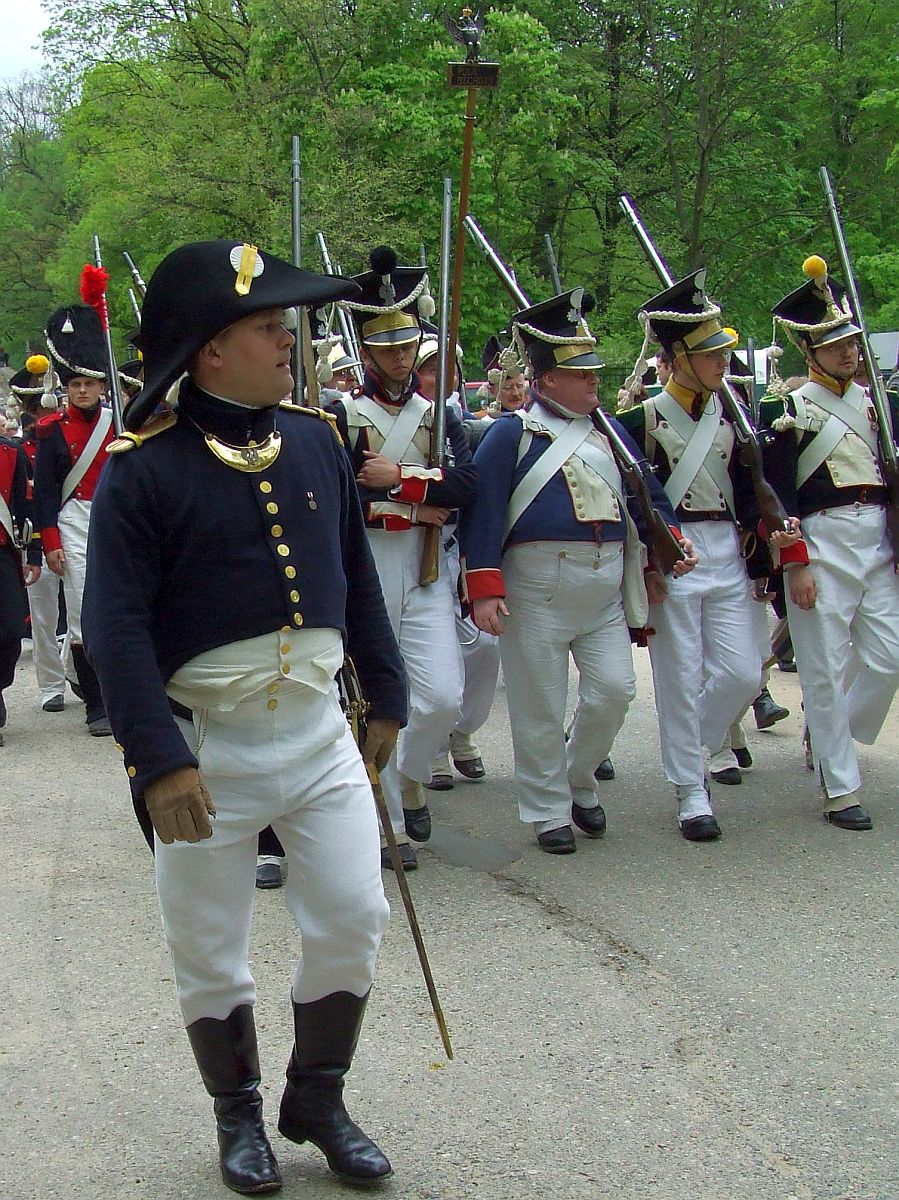
2nd Infantry Regiment, re-enactment, parade to mark the 3 May Parade in Łazienki Park

2nd Infantry regiment (Polish: 2 Pułk Piechoty) (Note: Initially as the 10th Infantry Regiment. By order of the Minister of War, Prince Józef Poniatowski, dated 4 June 1807, the unit was renamed the 2nd Infantry Regiment) was an infantry regiment in the Army of the Duchy of Warsaw.

== Formation and organisation ==
The 2nd Infantry Regiment was formed in Warsaw as the 2nd Infantry Regiment of the Legion of Warsaw (Polish: 2 pułk piechoty Legii Warszawskiej) The unit was made up of legionnaires and a group of officers and non-commissioned officers from the army of the Polish-Lithuanian Commonwealth. It became part of the 1st Warsaw Legion. On the 3 May 1807, a delegation from the regiment received the regimental standard from the inhabitants of the capital.

In 1808 the regiment was stationed at Modlin. At the end of 1809, the regiment numbered 3,030 soldiers. According to the 1810 establishment, the regiment consisted of a 27-strong staff and three infantry battalions, each comprising six companies. The battalion staffs were to consist of 4 officers, and the companies of 136 soldiers. In total, the regiment was to have 2,487 soldiers. In reality, the unit's strength was slightly lower.Following the War of the Fifth Coalition, the regiment was sent to Modlin, where it carried out intensive fortification work.

In accordance with Napoleon's order of 17 May 1811, three divisions were formed within the Duchy of Warsaw. The regiment became part of the 3rd Division.

During preparations for the French invasion of Russia in 1812, the regiment was incorporated into the 18th Division commanded by Ludwik Kamieniecki, part of the 5th Corps of Prince Józef Poniatowski in the Grande Armée.

The 2nd Infantry Regiment was re-formed following the defeat of in the French invasion of Russi, it became part of the Jan Henryk Dąbrowski Division. On 14 February 1813, under the command of Colonel Szymański, it crossed the national border and marched into Germany.

Following the defeat of Napoleon's forces in Saxony, the 2nd Infantry Regiment was disbanded on 18 December 1813 in Sedan.

Following Napoleon's abdication, Tsar Alexander I agreed to allow the Polish troops to return home. They were to form the basis for the creation of the Polish Army under the command of Grand Duke Constantine. On 13 June 1814, the regiment was assigned an assembly point in Poznań.

== Battles ==
The 2nd Infantry Regiment took part in War of the Fourth Coalition, Austro-Polish War, French invasion of Russia and War of the Sixth Coalition.

A few months after the regiments founding, its I battalion took part in fighting on the Narew river, in the Siege of Graudenz and fighting in Masuria.

During the Austro-Polish war puł he regiment defended against the Austrians at Raszyn, driving the Austrians back with a bayonet charge from the village of Puchały and blocking the Falencka dyke with fire during the final phase of the battle. The regiment fought at Jedlińsk and Wrzawy. However, they gained their greatest fame by capturing Zamość in a night-time assault. Prince Józef Poniatowski recognised their merits, making them his ‘personal regiment’ from that time onwards. The regiment also fought at Jankowice and at Wrzawy.

In the French invasion of Russia the 2nd Infantry Regiment stormed Smoleńsk where they suffered heavy losses. Then the regiment fought at Borodino, after the battle they finally reached Moscow. During the Battle of Berezina it covered the retreat of Napoleon's forces. Despite suffering heavy losses, however, the regiment did not lose his standard and returned from Russia as a cohesive unit.

From the surviving remnants, the personnel remaining at the regimental headquarters and the recruits in Warsaw and Kalisz, two infantry regiments were reconstituted in 1813. In February 1813, following the Battle of Kalisz on the 13 February, it withdrew from the Duchy of Warsaw to the Kingdom of Saxony, where it fought at Wittenberg, Raguhun, Rosslau, Kosswig and Duben, Juterborg and Dennwitz. As part of General Dąbrowski's Division, it took part in the Battle of Leipzig. It was one of the last infantry regiments to survive the defeat, and its remnants continued to fight. On 30 October, it fought at Hanau.

Together with the Grand Army, the regiment withdrew to France, where its soldiers were incorporated into the Legion of the Vistula and the 1st Regiment of Light Cavalry-Lancers of the Imperial Guard, fighting in their ranks until Napoleon's abdication. The battles the 2nd Infantry Regiment fought in were:

Battles/skirmishes	Date
On the Narew	13 May 1807
Graudenz	until 30 June 1807
Grzybów	18 April 1809
Zamość	20 May 1809
Jankowice	11 June 1809
Wrzawy	12 June 1809
Sandomierz	15 and 16 September 1809
Smolensk	17 August 1812
Borodino	5 and 7 September 1812
Chrikov	29 September 1812
Voronovo	18 and 20 October 1812
Medina	26 and 28 October 1812
Vyazma	3 November 1812
On the Berchyn River	28 November 1812
Near Kalisz	13 February 1813
Wittenberg	11 March 1813
Raguhn, Rosslau, Kosswig, Düben	15 August 1813
Jüterborg and Dennewitz	6 September 1813
Skenditz, Leipzig	18 and 19 October 1813

== Uniform ==
The dress regulations of 3 September 1810 did not lead to the complete standardisation of the infantry uniform. Some regiments differed quite significantly from the provisions of the regulations. (Note: The differences outlined by Gembarzewski on the basis of drawings, accounts and other regimental documents from that period.) In the 2nd Infantry Regiment, these were navy-blue non-commissioned officers’ tunics with crimson collars and matching trim on the sleeves; a braid above the cuff of the tunic.

== Standard ==
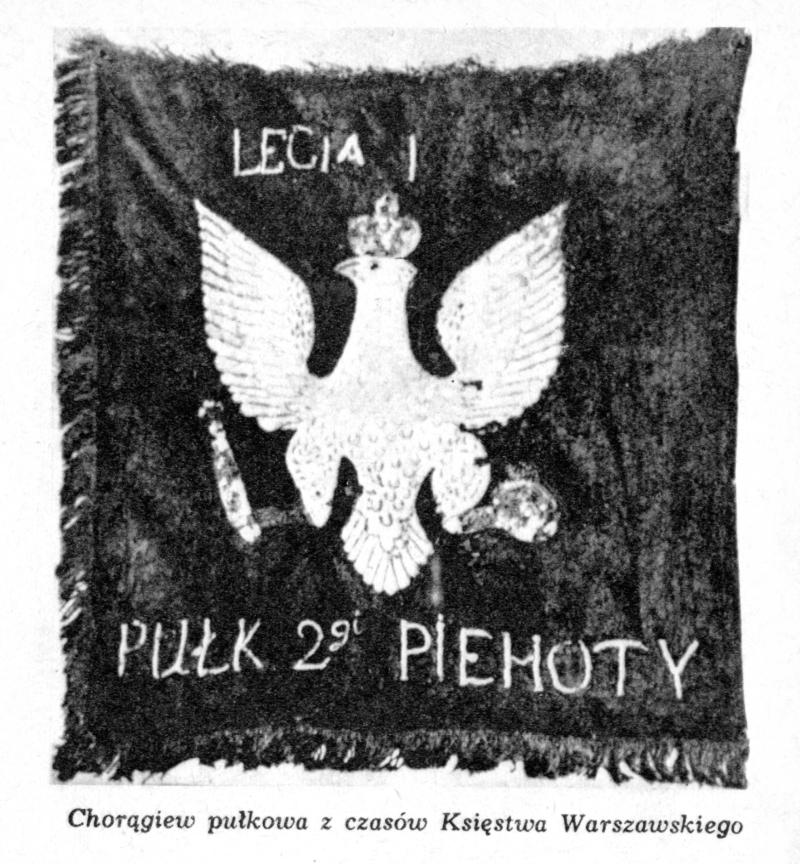
Standard of the 2nd Regiment from 1807

=== Regimental Standard ===
A crimson silk tabard measuring 48 cm by 50 cm. In the centre is an appliqué of a white cloth eagle, embroidered with silk. The crown, sceptre and orb, as well as the chain encircling the eagle, are silver. The inscription at the top, in white yarn, reads: ‘1st Legion' . Beneath the eagle: ‘2nd INFANTRY REGIMENT’. Silver fringe runs along three sides. The reverse side is similar, but blue. The eagle's head is turned the other way round.

==== Symbol of the colonel ====
(Note: colonel's flag)

The colonel's flag was a double pennant made measuring 50 cm by 45 cm. On the right-hand side, against an octagonal blue background, is the Polish eagle, embroidered in silver, with the crown, beak, talons, sceptre and orb embroidered in gold thread. Around the eagle are twigs, embroidered in various shades of green silk. The inscriptions in the corners of the banner are embroidered in gold thread on a white background: “1) for the Commander, 2) the Regiment, 3) Jan Kru/kowiecki”. The white section is surrounded by a gold-embroidered border. The banner is edged with crimson silk fabric and a silver fringe with thick twists.

On the reverse side, in the centre, a crimson circle bearing the inscription: ‘Ojczyzna’, embroidered in silver thread, surrounded by a laurel wreath embroidered in gold. The background is a blue octagon. Above the circle is an inscription embroidered in silver: ‘Woysko Polskie’ (English: Polish Army); below the circle: ‘2nd Infantry Regiment of 1811’. The blue background is sewn onto white silk fabric. At its four corners are inscriptions embroidered in gold, identical to those on the reverse. Around the blue centre is a border of crimson silk fabric. A leather sleeve is sewn onto the banner to attach it to the pole. The banner is located in the military museum in Warsaw.

== Regimental commanders ==
- Col. Stanisław Florian Potocki (9 December 1806)
- Col. Jan Krukowiecki (20 March 1810)
- mjr (ppłk, płk) Józef Szymanowski (13 February 1813-18 December1813)
