= 1st Division (Duchy of Warsaw) =

1 Division
- 1 Dywizja
- Active: 1806 -1813
- Allegiance: Duchy of Warsaw
- Branch: Army

Commanders
- Notable commanders: Józef Poniatowski

The 1st Division (Polish: 1 Dywizja) – was a division in the Army of the Duchy of Warsaw.

== Division history ==
From 1806, it operated as the Warsaw Legion (Polish: Legia Warszawska). When it was organised, six battalions were formed in the Warsaw department and two in the Płock department.

In 1808, the Legion was reorganised and the 1st Division was formed. Its commander was the former commander of the Warsaw Legion, General Józef Poniatowski.

== Structural organistation ==
Following the reorganisation and personnel changes, the division's status in mid-1808 was as follows:

Commanders

- Division commander – General Józef Poniatowski
- Major of the Division (Note: Deputy division commander) – General Łukasz Biegański
- Chief of Staff – Colonel Franciszek Paszkowski
- Brigade commanders: General Wincenty Aksamitowski, General Stanisław Wojczyński
- Commander's aide-de-camp – Colonel Józef Rautenstrauch
- War commissioner – Marcin Molski
- Without assignment – General Kamieniecki
- Chief health officer – Onufry Lucey

Divisions

- 1st Infantry Regiment – commanding officer, Colonel Kazimierz Małachowski (1642 soldiers)
- 2nd Infantry Regiment – commanding officer, Colonel Stanisław Potocki (1742 soldiers)
- 3rd Infantry Regiment – commanding officer, Colonel Edward Żółtowski (1927 soldiers)
- 4th Infantry Regiment – commanding officer, Colonel Feliks Potocki
- 1st mounted rifle regiment – commanding officer, Colonel Konstanty Przebendowski (730 soldiers)
- 2nd Uhlan Regiment – commanding officer Tadeusz Tyszkiewicz (800 soldiers)
- 1st Foot Artillery Battalion – commander, Lieutenant Colonel Jakub Redel
- 1st Horse Artillery Company
- 13th Infantry Regiment - commander, Col. Franciszek Żymirski
