= IV Cavalry Corps (Grande Armée) =

- Active: 1812–1814
- Country: First French Empire
- Branch: French Imperial Army
- Type: Shock cavalry
- Size: Corps
- Engagements: Russian campaign War of the Sixth Coalition

Commanders
- Notable commanders: Victor de Fay de La Tour-Maubourg; François Étienne de Kellermann; Édouard Jean Baptiste Milhaud

The IV Cavalry Corps of the Grande Armée was a French military unit that existed during the Napoleonic Wars. The corps was created in 1812 and rebuilt in 1813 and 1815. Emperor Napoleon I first organized the corps for the invasion of Russia. Under General Victor de Fay de La Tour-Maubourg, the corps fought at Borodino. During the War of the Sixth Coalition in 1813, General François Étienne de Kellermann commanded the all-Polish corps at Leipzig.

== History ==
=== 1812 ===
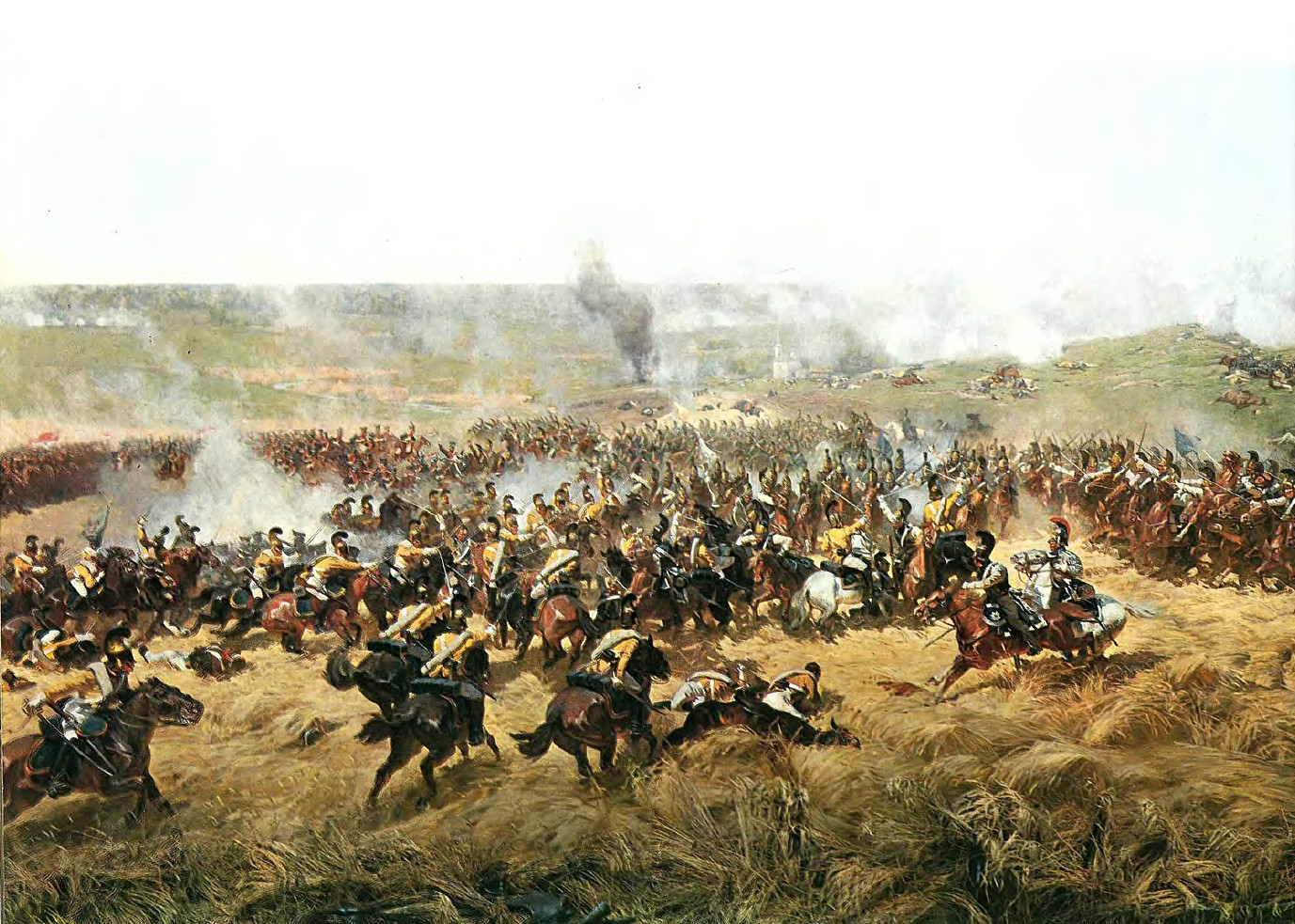
Saxon cavalrymen at left attacking Russian cuirassiers at Borodino

At the beginning of the invasion of Russia, the IV Cavalry Corps numbered 7,964 troopers in 40 squadrons with 24 cannons attached. The corps was placed under the leadership of General Victor de Fay de La Tour-Maubourg and organized into two divisions under Generals Alexander Rozniecki and Jean Thomas Guillaume Lorge. Rozniecki's 4th Light Cavalry Division was made up of Poles while Lorge's 7th Heavy Cavalry Division consisted of Poles, Saxons, and Westphalians. Along with three infantry corps, the corps formed part of the Second Support Army under King Jérôme Bonaparte. On 9 July 1812, General Casimir Turno's 900-strong brigade of Rozniecki's division was defeated by 4,500 Cossacks under General Matvei Platov at Karelichy. The 3rd, 15th, and 16th Lancers lost 356 men killed, wounded, or captured. The next day, near Mir, 1,600 troopers of Rozniecki's division were again defeated in a clash with a mixed force of 5,000 Russians, including Russian regular infantry and cavalry plus Cossacks. Elements of the Polish 2nd, 3rd, 9th, 11th, 15th, and 16th Lancer Regiments were engaged. The Russians suffered 180 casualties while Polish losses are unknown.

The IV Cavalry Corps was engaged at the Battle of Borodino on 7 September 1812. The 4th Light Cavalry Division deployed three regiments of Polish uhlans backed by two Polish horse artillery batteries. The 7th Heavy Cavalry Division counted two regiments of Saxon, two of Westphalian, and one of Polish cuirassiers, supported by one Saxon and one Westphalian horse artillery batteries. The final attack on the Great Redoubt occurred at 2:00 PM. Prince Eugène de Beauharnais sent three infantry divisions in a frontal attack, while the III Cavalry Corps advanced on the left and the II Cavalry Corps and IV Cavalry Corps advanced on the right. The cavalry on the right-hand side soon trotted past the marching infantry and drove for the left side of the redoubt. According to the Saxon colonel of the Zastrow Regiment, the young-looking La Tour-Maubourg deftly led the corps past the left end of the redoubt. Galloping over dead bodies from the earlier fighting, Lorge's cuirassiers were the first into the fieldwork. Some cavalrymen forced their way through embrasures while others swept around the rear. Massed inside the Great Redoubt, the Russian infantry refused to give up as infantrymen and horsemen engaged in a wild frenzy of slaughter. When the French infantry finally burst into the fieldwork from the front, they quickly massacred the remaining defenders. Witnesses later described a ghastly scene with some corpses torn apart by artillery fire and others stacked several layers deep.

After the capture of Moscow, the French cavalry under Marshal Joachim Murat were assigned to watch the Russian camp near Tarutino. Camped in the open, men and horses sickened and died in large numbers. By mid-October, General Thielmann reported that the Saxon cavalry brigade could only muster 50 horses. La Tour-Maubourg led a remnant of his corps at the Battle of Krasnoi on 16 November 1812. On this occasion, the corps held off Russian cavalry and Cossacks, allowing the retreating army to utilize the main highway. About the time of this action, many units of the main army simply dissolved.

=== 1813–1814 ===
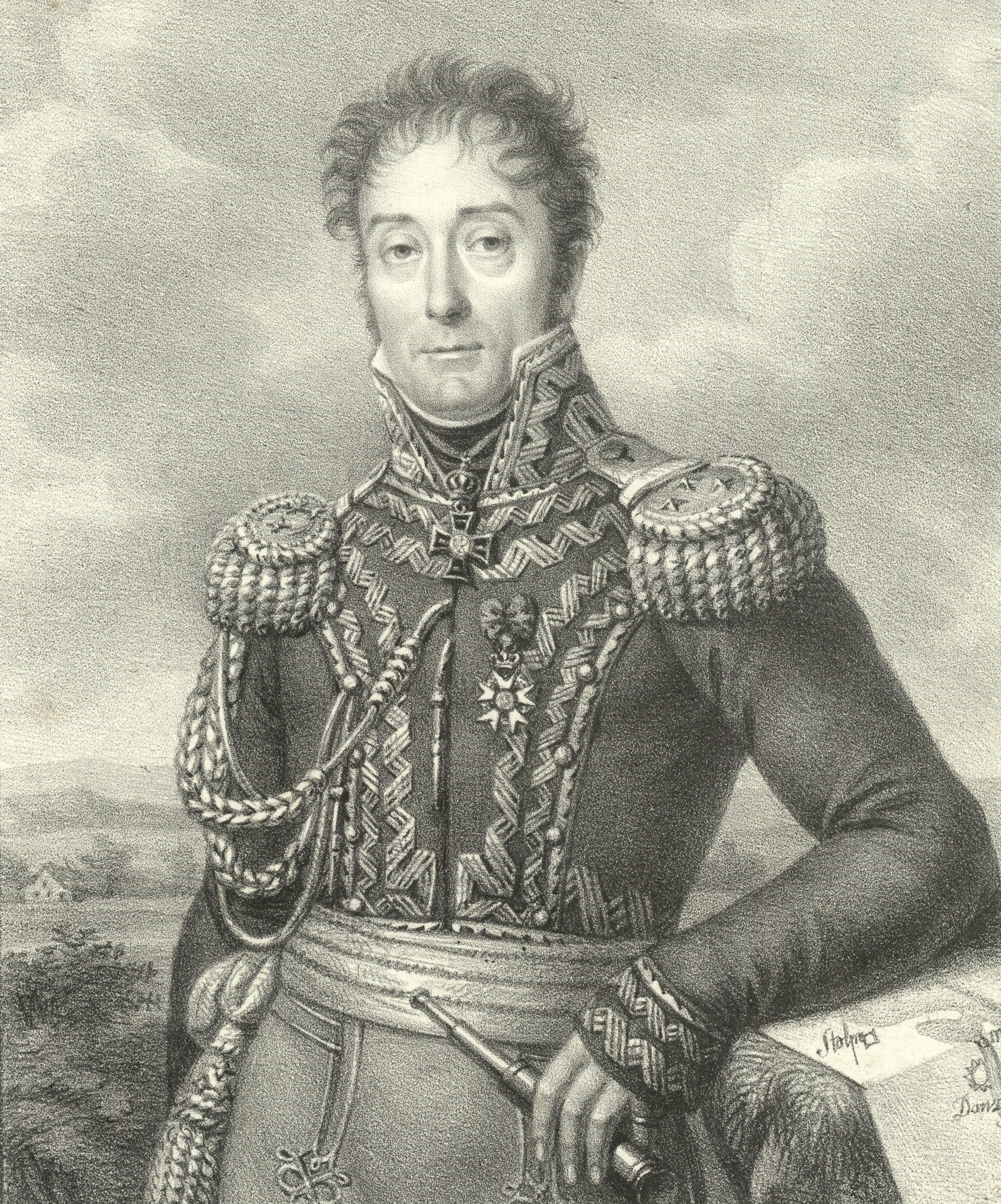
Michał Sokolnicki

When the 1813 summer armistice ended, the IV Cavalry Corps counted 3,923 horsemen in 24 squadrons with 12 artillery pieces attached. Napoleon appointed General François Étienne de Kellermann to lead the formation. During the spring campaign, the Polish Army under Prince Józef Poniatowski was isolated near Warsaw. By an agreement with the Allies, the Poles were permitted free passage to join Napoleon's forces in Saxony. From the Allied perspective, the arrangement freed up a large number of troops who would otherwise be required to contain the Poles. The Poles were allowed to march through neutral territory of Austria. The IV Cavalry Corps was instructed to assemble at Bautzen along with the I Corps under General Dominique Vandamme. All told, 37,000 soldiers including 5,000 cavalry and 88 guns were massed at Bautzen. On 27 September, the IV Cavalry Corps and the VIII Corps under Poniatowski were located at Waldheim. At this time, corps strength was about 3,000 troopers and 12 guns. On 14 October, 8,550 cavalrymen including the IV Cavalry Corps, V Cavalry Corps, General Frédéric de Berkheim's division of the I Cavalry Corps, and a Polish cuirassier regiment engaged the Allies at Liebertwolkwitz. Though the French held their ground, the combat was not a success because Murat's dense tactical formations were fended off by only 5,570 Allied horsemen. One source credited Kellermann's corps with only 1,800 combatants in the action. At the start of the Battle of Leipzig on 16 October, the IV Cavalry Corps was positioned directly behind Poniatowski's corps. The corps comprised the 7th and 8th Light Cavalry Divisions under Generals Michael Sokolnicki and Antoni Pawel respectively. Each division had two brigades consisting of two regiments each. In both divisions, three regiments were made up of uhlans and one of hussars. All corps units were Poles with the exception that one of the two horse artillery batteries was French. When Napoleon ordered the retreat, Kellermann's corps was directed to accompany the Imperial Guard and several other units.

The III Cavalry Corps under General Jean-Toussaint Arrighi de Casanova and the IV Cavalry Corps under General Horace François Bastien Sébastiani de La Porta served in Marshal Jacques MacDonald's command during the first week of February 1814.

== Orders of battle ==
=== Borodino, 1812 ===
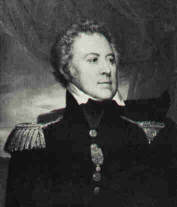
Victor de La Tour Maubourg

IV Cavalry Corps: General of Division Victor de Fay de La Tour-Maubourg

- 4th Light Cavalry Division: General of Division Alexander Rozniecki
  - 1st Brigade: General of Brigade Casimir Turno
    - 3rd Polish Uhlan Regiment (3 squadrons)
    - 11th Polish Uhlan Regiment (3 squadrons)
    - 16th Polish Uhlan Regiment (3 squadrons)
  - Divisional Artillery:
    - 3rd Polish Horse Artillery Battery (6 guns)
    - 4th Polish Horse Artillery Battery (6 guns)
- 7th Heavy Cavalry Division: General of Division Jean Thomas Guillaume Lorge
  - 1st Brigade: General of Brigade von Thielemann
    - 14th Polish Cuirassier Regiment (2 squadrons)
    - Saxon Garde du Corps Regiment (4 squadrons)
    - Saxon Zastrow Cuirassier Regiment (4 squadrons)
  - 2nd Brigade: General of Brigade Lepel
    - 1st Westphalian Cuirassier Regiment (4 squadrons)
    - 2nd Westphalian Cuirassier Regiment (4 squadrons)
  - Divisional Artillery:
    - Saxon 2nd Horse Artillery Battery (6 guns)
    - Westphalian 2nd Horse Artillery Battery (6 guns)

Source: "Order of Battle of Borodino". napolun.com. 2007.

=== Leipzig, 1813 ===
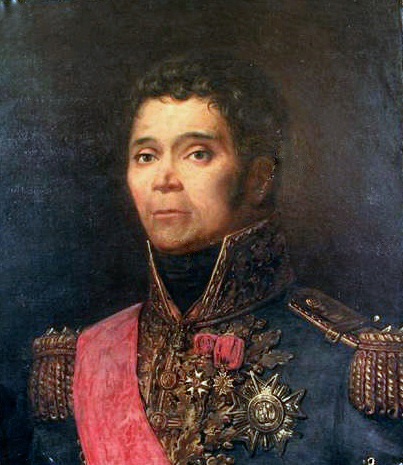
François de Kellermann

IV Cavalry Corps: General of Division François Étienne de Kellermann

- 7th Light Cavalry Division: General of Division Michael Sokolnicki
  - 17th Light Cavalry Brigade: General of Brigade Jozef Tolinski
    - 3rd Polish Uhlan Regiment (4 squadrons)
    - 1st Polish Chasseur Regiment (4 squadrons)
  - 18th Light Cavalry Brigade: General of Brigade Jan Krukowiecki
    - 2nd Polish Uhlan Regiment (4 squadrons)
    - 4th Polish Uhlan Regiment (4 squadrons)
- 8th Light Cavalry Division: General of Division Antoni Pawel
  - 19th Light Cavalry Brigade: General of Brigade Casimir Turno
    - 6th Polish Uhlan Regiment (4 squadrons)
    - 8th Polish Uhlan Regiment (4 squadrons)
  - 20th Light Cavalry Brigade: General of Brigade Jan Weyssenhoff
    - 1st Polish Hussar Regiment (4 squadrons)
    - 10th Polish Uhlan Regiment (4 squadrons)
- Corps Artillery:
  - Polish Horse Artillery Battery
  - French 2nd Company of the 4th Horse Artillery Regiment

Source: "French Order of Battle at Leipzig". The Napoleon Series. 2004.
