= 13th Infantry Regiment (Duchy of Warsaw) =

- 13 pułk piechoty
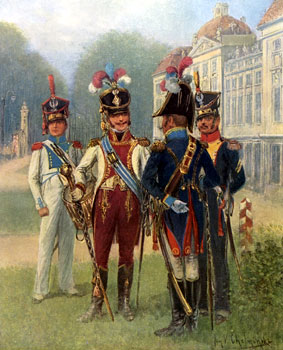
- Soldiers of the 13th Infantry Regiment by Jan Chełmiński
- Active: 1809-1814
- Allegiance: Duchy of Warsaw
- Branch: Army of the Duchy of Warsaw
- Type: Infantry
- Size: 3435 soldiers - 1809
- Part of: 1st Division
- Garrison/HQ: Zamość
- Engagements: French invasion of Russia

13th Infantry Regiment (Polish: 13 pułk piechoty) was an infantry division in the Army of the Duchy of Warsaw.

== Formation and organisation ==
In the summer of 1809, during the Polish–Austrian War, six new infantry regiments were formed. To avoid straining relations with the Russian Empire, they were given the name ‘Galician–French’. The 13th Infantry Regiment was formed at the expense of the Lublin, Siedlce and Biała Podlaskie districts from the lands of West Galicia, lands that the Austrian Empire took from the Polish-Lithuanian Commonwealth in the third partition. Until 26 December 1809, it was known as the 1st Galician-French Infantry Regiment (Polish:1 pułku piechoty galicyjsko-francuskiej). By the end of 1809, the regiment was listed as having 3,435 soldiers. After the end of the Polish-Austrian War it was stationed at Zamość.According to the 1810 establishment, the regiment consisted of a 27-strong staff and three infantry battalions, each comprising six companies. The battalion staffs were to consist of 4 officers, and the companies of 136 soldiers. In total, the regiment was to have 2,487 soldiers. In reality, the unit’s strength was slightly lower.

In accordance with Napoleon’s order of 17 May 1811, three divisions were formed within the Duchy of Warsaw. The regiment became part of the 1st Division.

During the French invasion of Russia in 1812, the regiment remained in the country and garrisoned Zamość. In 1812 and 1813, the regiment fought to defend its home garrison.

After the abdication of Napoleon, Tsar Alexander I He gave his consent for the Polish troops to be sent back to Poland. They were to form the basis for the creation of the Polish Army under the command of Grand Duke Constantine. On 13 June 1814, the regiment was assigned a staging area in Poznań. However, the regiment was not re-established, as Congress Poland’s army establishment provided for only 12 infantry regiments. New infantry regiments were not formed until after the outbreak of the November Uprising. An order issued by the dictator, General Józef Chłopicki, on 10 January 1831, placed the responsibility for organising them on the provincial authorities. In the Kalisz Province, the 1st Kalisz Provincial Regiment was formed, later renamed the 13th Line Infantry Regiment.

== Regiment commanders ==
The leaders of the 13th Regiment were:

- Col. August Szneyder (5 July 1809),
- Col. Jakub Kęszycki (20 March 1810),
- Col. Franciszek Żymirski (17 April 1811).

The position of major was held by:

- Major Kaklist Zakrzewski (5 August 1809)
- Major Józef Obertyński (27 December 1811)
- Major Henryk Dulfus (27 December 1811)

== Uniform ==
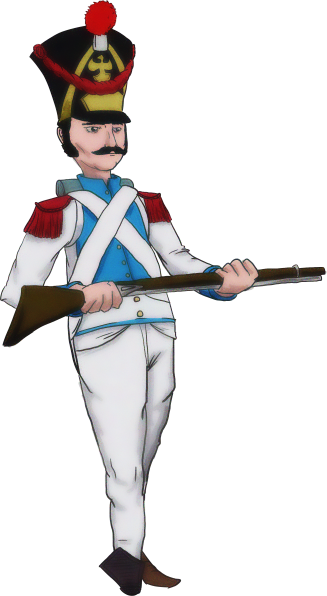
Grenadier of the 13th Infantry Regiment

The regiment differed from the rest of the army in the colour of its uniforms. Upon entering Zamość, the soldiers were issued with white uniforms featuring blue trim, sourced from the Austrian army’s stores. The collars, cuffs and gold buttons were retained, whilst blue epaulettes were added. The trousers, like the coats, were also white. On their heads they wore black shakos with a pompom and cords in colours corresponding to the light infantry, voltigeur and fusilier companies.

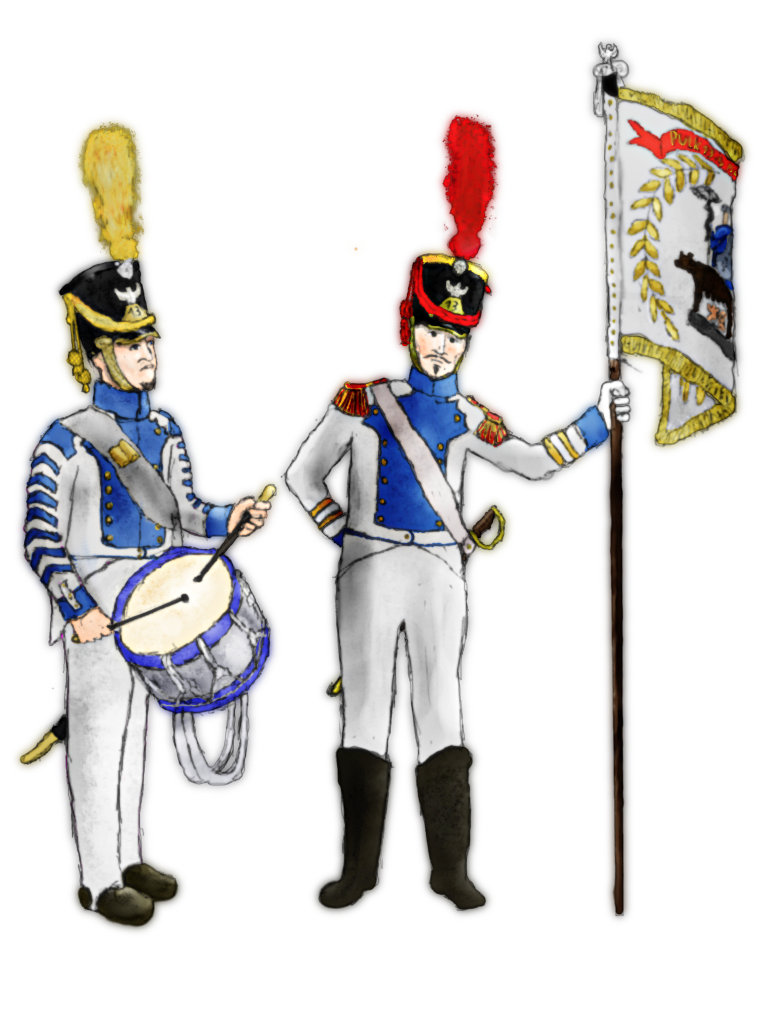
A sergeant with the standard of the 13th Infantry Regiment and a drummer

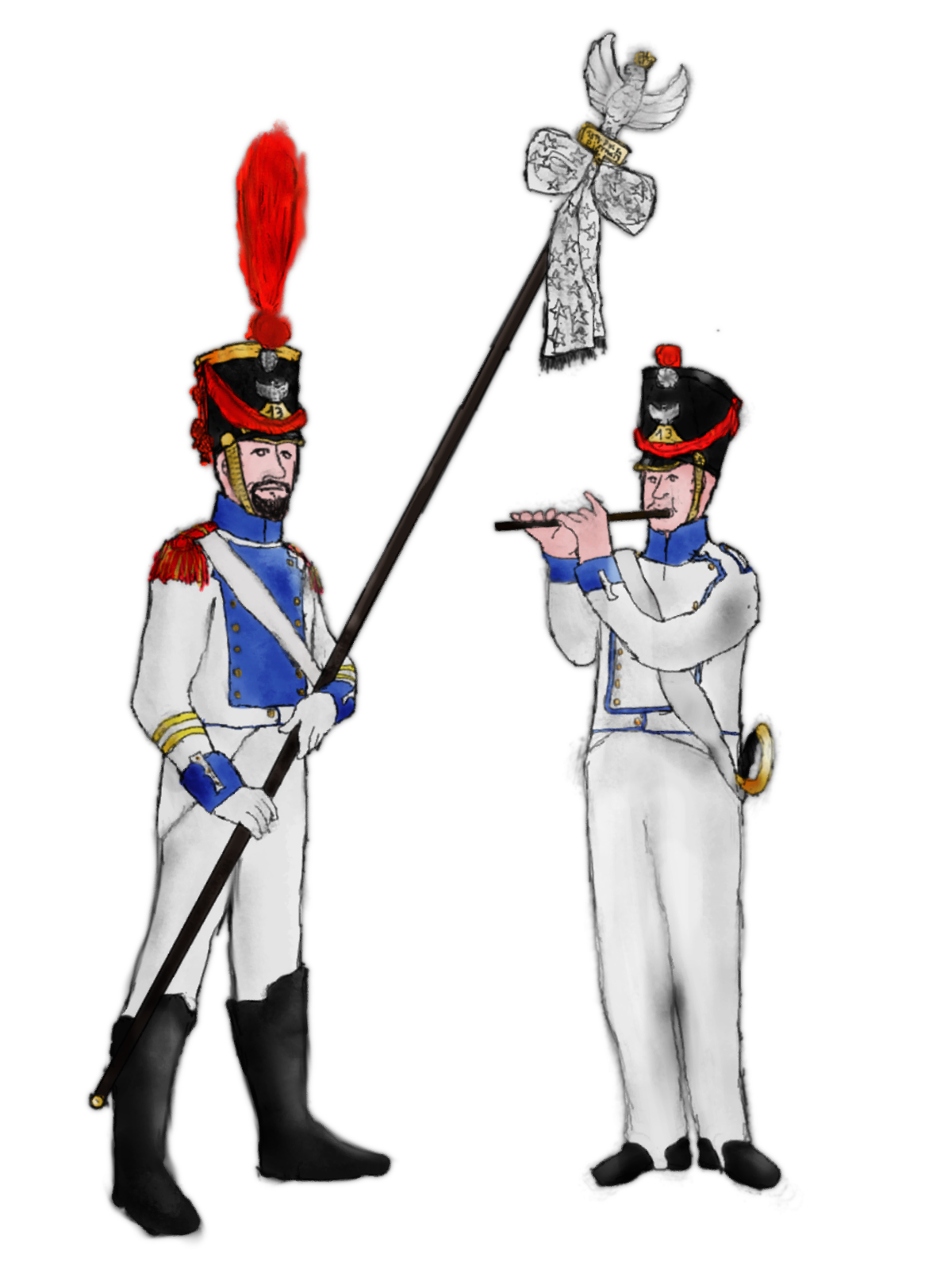
Sergeant Orłowy of the 13th Infantry Regiment, accompanied by a flute player

The officer’s uniform can be seen in an engraving by Gembarzewski, who, based on a miniature portrait of W. Łukasiński from 1813, depicted the captain in full dress uniform. A navy blue tailcoat with gold buttons, gold epaulettes, a black ‘pieróg’-style cap, white trousers and high black boots.

== Standard ==
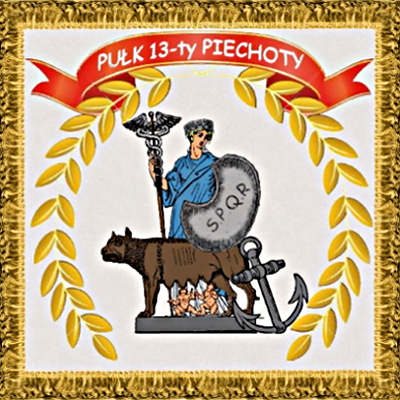
Standard of the 13th Infantry Regiment, 1809

=== Standard of the 13th Infantry Regiment ===
The standard is white in colour, measuring 70 cm by 63 cm. In the centre, within a gold-painted frame, is a figure of Roma wearing a white chiton and a blue himation, with a muralis crown on her head. In her right hand she holds a Caduceus, and in her left a shield bearing the letters S.P.Q.R., At the feet, the Capitoline she-wolf with Romulus and Remus; an anchor to the side. Above the border, a ribbon bearing the inscription ‘13th INFANTRY REGIMENT’.The flagpole is 250 cm long, painted black, with a plaque bearing an eagle. On the standard, the inscription ‘WOYSKO POLSKIE’ is in gilded letters; on the reverse, ‘13th INFANTRY REGIMENT’; the plaque is framed with gilded sheet metal. The eagle is a hollow silver figure, without a crown. In place of the cockade, there is a gold cord with a knot and tassels.

=== The eagle of the 13th Infantry Regiment ===
A silver eagle, beneath which is a plaque with a brass frame bearing the inscription: “WOYSKO POLSKIE”. On the reverse, the inscription: “13th INFANTRY REGIMENT”. Below the ferrule, a white silk bow is fastened with four nails with gilded heads, featuring stars embroidered in silver. The bow is 125 cm long and 45 cm wide. The bow is folded in three and is nailed to the shaft halfway along its length.
