= 3rd Infantry Regiment =

3rd Infantry Regiment may refer to the following units:

- 3rd Infantry Regiment (Duchy of Warsaw)
- 3rd Infantry Regiment (Lithuania)
- 3rd Infantry Regiment (United States)

== See also ==
- 3rd Regiment (disambiguation)
