= 7th Uhlan Regiment (Duchy of Warsaw) =

- 7 Pułk Ułanów; 1 pułk jazdy galicyjsko-francuskie
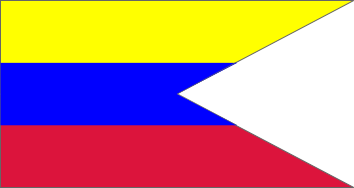
- Lance pennant
- Active: 1809-1813
- Allegiance: Duchy of Warsaw
- Type: Uhlan
- Size: 610 soldiers - 1809
- Engagements: Austro-Polish War; French invasion of Russia

Commanders
- Notable commanders: Augustyn Zawadzki

7th Uhlan Regiment (Polish: 7 Pułk Ułanów) – is an uhlan regiment of the Army of the Duchy of Warsaw.

== Regimental history ==
The formation of the regiment began on 20 April 1809 on the initiative of Rajmund Rembieliński, Prefect of Płock, in the Łomża and Płock departments. It was initially called the Płock Cavalry Regiment (Polish: pułku jazdy płockiej). Until the 28th December 1809 the regiment was called the 1st Galician-French Cavalry Regiment (Polish: 1 pułku jazdy galicyjsko-francuskiej). From 1810 onwards it was called the 7th Uhlan Regiment

At the end of 1809 the regiment was listed as having 610 soldiers.

From accounts by Henryk Dembiński The 7th Uhlan Regiment did not have the best reputation in terms of training: There was such a seed of disorder in the regiment that it was always in turmoil until the end of its existence.

== Uniform ==
From 1810 onwards the official colours of the uniform were:

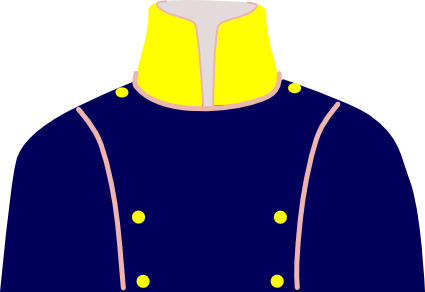
Yellow collar with crimson trim. Navy blue lapels with crimson trim..

Yellow sleeve cuffs with crimson piping

Yellow lampasse (Note: In the illustration, the officer has stripes of a different colour.)

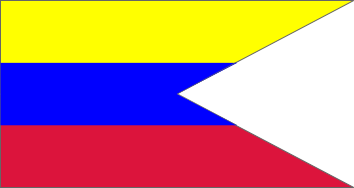
The yellow colour was also featured on one of the pennant's sections, referring to the colour assigned to the Vistula Legions, on whose territory the unit was formed.

== Regiment commanders ==
- Col. Augustyn Zawadzki (26 April 1809)

== Regimental battles ==
The regiment took part in the Austro-Polish War and French invasion of Russia.

On 30 April 1809, the regiment crossed the Bug River and attacked Austrian border posts, taking numerous prisoners. On 2 June, between Góra and Piaseczno, it successfully pursued Austrian hussars. On 4 June, it crossed to the left bank of the Vistula River and captured Kozienice. Some of the regiment's lancers allowed themselves to carry out unlawful requisitions in a manner that disgraced the dignity of Polish soldiers during the fighting, for which their commander received a severe reprimand from the commander-in-chief.

Battles and Skirmishes:

Battles and skirmishes	Date
Góra Piaseczna	2 June 1809
Kozienice	4 June 1809
Kobylin	5 June 1809
Konary	7 June 1809
Grabowo	14 June 1809
Sulejów	16 June 1809
Mir	10 July 1812
Borisov	20 November 1812

== See also ==
- Army of the Duchy of Warsaw
- Battle of Mir
