= 11th Uhlan Regiment (Duchy of Warsaw) =

11 Uhlan Regiment
- 11 Pułk Ułanów
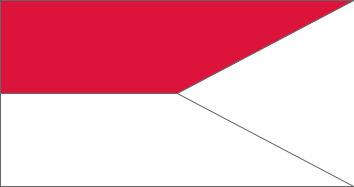
- Lance pennant
- Active: 1809-1813
- Disbanded: 1813
- Allegiance: Duchy of Warsaw
- Type: Light cavalry
- Size: 899 soldiers - 1809
- Part of: Aleksander Rożniecki's Cavalry Division - 1809; Cavalry Division of Antoni Paweł Sułkowski - 1813
- Engagements: French invasion of Russia; Battle of Mir; Battle of Borodino

Commanders
- Notable commanders: Adam Potocki; Aleksander Oborski; Alexander Fredro (Officer); Kazimierz Tański

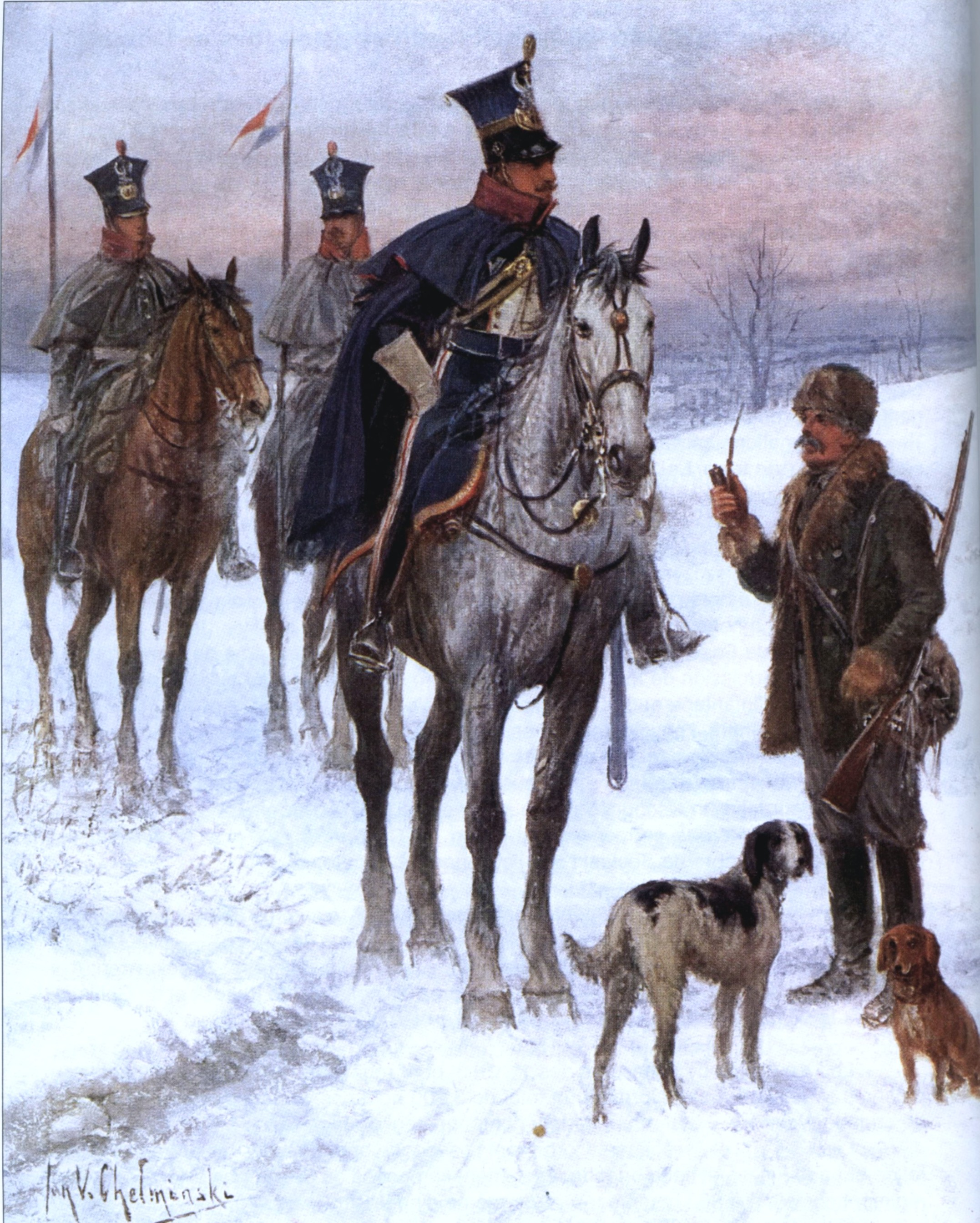
11 Ulhan regiment by Jan Chełmiński

The 11th Uhlan Regiment (Polish: 11 Pułk Ułanów) – was a Polish cavalry division of the Duchy of Warsaw Army.

It was formed at the end of May 1809 in Lviv by Colonel Adam Potocki. At the end of 1809 the regiment had 899 soldiers.

Until the 28 December 1809 the regiment was called the 4th Galician-French Cavalry Regiment (4 Pułkiem Jazdy Galicyjsko-Francuskiej).

== Uniform ==
From 1810 onwards the following regimental uniform was put in force:

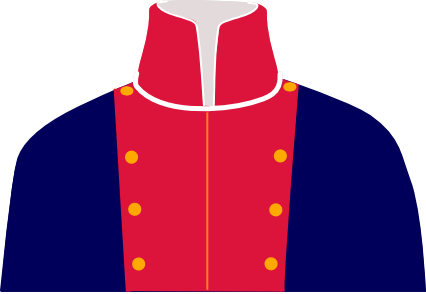
Crimson collar with white piping; crimson trimmings.

Crimson Lampasse

== Commanders ==
The regiment commanders were as follows:

- Col. Adam Potocki (1 July 1809)
- Col. Aleksander Oborski (18 January 1813)
- Major Kazimierz Tański (30 April 1811)

Officers:

- Aleksander Fredro (from 1812 onwards)

== Battles ==
The regiment took part in Napoleons French invasion of Russia

Battles:

- Battle of Mir (10 July 1812),
- Battle of Borodino (7 September 1812)

== See also ==
- Battle of Borodino
- Army of the Duchy of Warsaw
- Battle of Mir
