= 2nd Uhlan Regiment (Duchy of Warsaw) =

- 2 Pułk Ułanów; 2 Pułk Lekkiej Jazdy Legionu I
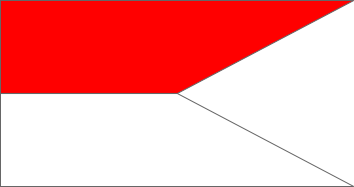
- Lance pennant
- Active: 1809-1813
- Allegiance: Duchy of Warsaw
- Branch: Army
- Type: Cavalry
- Size: 1363 soldiers (1809)
- Part of: 1 Division (before 1812); Aleksander Rożniecki's Cavalry Division (after 1812); 16th Division of Józef Zajączek - 1812 (Note: The regiments comprising the divisional cavalry brigade later formed Michał Ignacy Kamieński's 4th Cavalry Division.); Michał Ignacy Kamieński's 4th Cavalry Division - 1812; Cavalry Division of Antoni Paweł Sułkowski - 1813
- Garrison/HQ: Warsaw
- Engagements: War of the Fourth Coalition; Austro-Polish War; French invasion of Russia; War of the Sixth Coalition

Commanders
- Notable commanders: Walenty Kwaśniewski; Tadeusz Tyszkiewicz; Ludwik Michał Pac; Józef Rzodkiewicz

The 2nd Uhlan Regiment (Polish: 2 Pułk Ułanów) – was an uhlan regiment of the army of the Duchy of Warsaw.

== Regimental history ==
The regiment was formed in 1806 as the 2nd Light Cavalry Regiment of the 1st Legion (Polish: 2 Pułk Lekkiej Jazdy Legionu I) some time later the regiments name was changed to the 2nd Uhlan Regiment. In 1808 it was stationed at Warsaw. At the end of 1809 the regiment was listed as having 1363 soldiers.

== Uniform ==
Until 1809, the regiment bore the colours of the 1st Legion. These were yellow epaulettes with yellow or gold buttons and braid, and crimson sleeve turnbacks and collars.

From 1810 onwards, the regimental uniform of the 2nd Uhlan Regiment was:

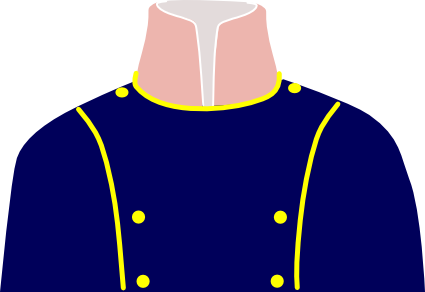
Crimson collar with white piping; navy blue trimmings with yellow piping

... Crimson sleeve cuffs with white piping

Yellow trouser Lampasse

== Regimental commanders ==
The regimental commanders of the 2nd Uhlan Regiment were:

- Colonel Walenty Kwaśniewski (26 December 1806)
- Colonel Tadeusz Tyszkiewicz (14 December 1808)
- Colonel Ludwik Pac (28 June 1812)
- Colonel Józef Rzodkiewicz (18 January 1813)

== Regimental engagements ==
The regiment took part in the War of the Fourth Coalition, Austro-Polish War, French invasion of Russia and War of the Sixth Coalition.

Battles and skirmishes:

Battles and Skirmishes	Date
Zatory	9 May 1807
Nadarzyn	19 April 1809
Praga	21 April 1809
Grochów	25 April 1809
Sandomierz	18 May 1809
Różki	5 June 1809
Baranów	9 June 1809
Wrzawy	12 June 1809
Przedbórz	8 July 1809
Mir	10 July 1812
Gera	1813
Dennewitz	6 September 1813

== See also ==
- Battle of Mir
- 1st Division
- Army of the Duchy of Warsaw
