= 1st Infantry Regiment (Duchy of Warsaw) =

1st Infantry regiment
- 1 Pułk Piechoty
- Active: 1806–1814
- Disbanded: 1814 (Reorganised into the Congress Poland army)
- Country: Duchy of Warsaw
- Branch: Land Army
- Type: Infantry
- Size: 2690 Soldiers - 1809
- Part of: 1 Division - 1808; 17 Division - 1812; 26 Division - 1813
- Garrison/HQ: Warsaw, Kalisz, Częstochowa
- Engagements: War of the Fourth Coalition; Austro-Polish War; French invasion of Russia; War of the Sixth Coalition; Battle of Leipzig

Commanders
- Notable commanders: col. Michał Grabowski; col. Kazimierz Małachowski; col. Stefan Koszarski; col. Ludwik Tadeusz Piotrowski

The 1st Infantry regiment was an infantry regiment which was a part of the Army of the Duchy of Warsaw.

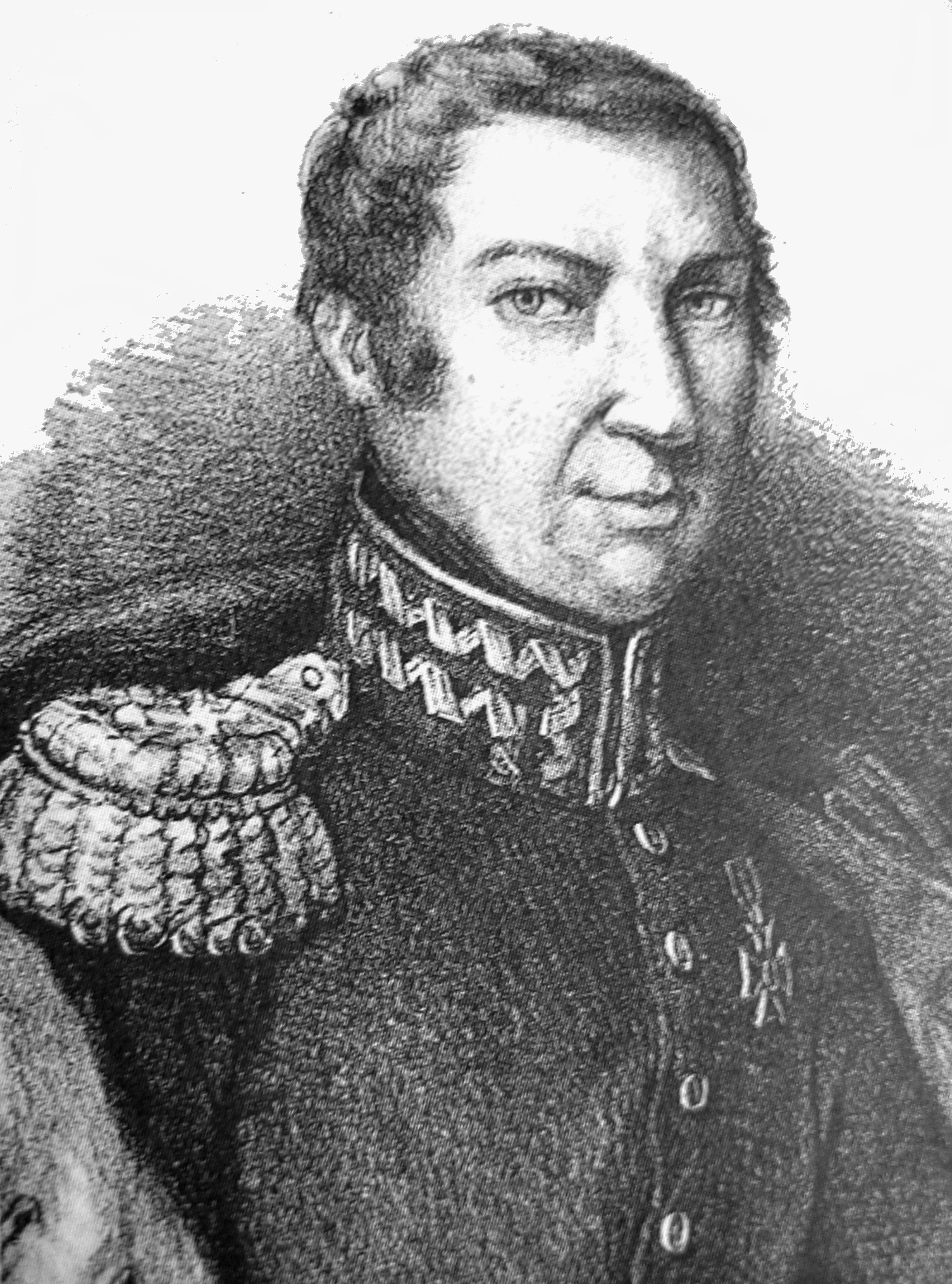
Kazimierz Małachowski

== Regimental history ==
The regiment was created in 1806 in Warsaw. The regiment was later stationed in the cities of Warsaw, Kalisz and Częstochowa. At the end of 1809, the regiment was recorded as having 2690 soldiers. According to the 1810 staffing table, the regiment consisted of a 27-person staff and three infantry battalions, each with six companies. The battalion staff was to have 4 people, and the companies 136 soldiers. In total, 2,487 soldiers were to serve in the regiment. However, the unit's personnel were slightly smaller. In accordance with Napoleon's decree of 17 May 1811, three divisions were established in the Duchy of Warsaw. The regiment became part of the 2 Division.

During the preparations for the invasion of Russia in 1812, the regiment was incorporated into the structure of Jan Henryk Dąbrowski's 17th Division of Prince Józef Poniatowski's V Corps of the Grand Army.

After the defeat of the Russian campaign of 1812, the regiment was re-established, consisting of two battalions of 700 soldiers each. It became part of the 26th Division, commanded by Ludwik Kamieniecki. Command of the regiment was taken over by Colonel Tadeusz Piotrowski.

After the abdication of Napoleon, Tsar Alexander I agreed to send Polish troops back to their country. They were to form the basis for the creation of the Polish Army under the command of Grand Duke Konstantin Pavlovich. On 13 June 1814, the regiment was assigned a garrison in Krakow.

== Regiment commanders ==
The commanders of the regiment were:

- col. Michał Grabowski (from the 4 January 1807),
- col. Kazimierz Małachowski (from the 8 April 1808),
- col. Stefan Koszarski (from the 21 October 1812),
- col. Ludwik Tadeusz Piotrowski (from the 18 January 1813).

== Battles ==
The regiment took part in the Napoleonic wars specifically: War of the Fourth Coalition, Austro-Polish War, French invasion of Russia and War of the Sixth Coalition.

Battles and engagements:

Battle	Date
Wały	5 May 1807
Ruda	12 May 1807, 16 May and 5 June 1809
Raszyn	19 April 1809
Praga	25 and 27 April 1809
Vistula	11 May 1809
Sandomierz	7,9,12,13 and 16 June 1809
Wrzawy	12 June 1809
Kazimierzów	8 September 1812
Horbaszewice	16 September 1812
Pankratowice	21 November 1812
Borysów	21 November 1812
Berezyną	28 November 1812
Saalburg-Ebersdorf	6 September 1813
Penig	7 October 1813
Lunzenau	7 October 1813
Chemnitz	9 October 1813
Leipzig	18 and 19 October 1813

== Uniform ==
The dress code of 3 September 1810 did not lead to complete standardization of the infantry uniform. Some regiments differed significantly from the regulations. (Note: Differences presented by Gembarzewski based on contemporary drawings, accounts and other regimental documents.) In the 1st Infantry Regiment, there were black kits on the caps of the fusiliers, white woolen epaulets with tassels on the shoulders of the fusiliers, and cartridge pouches without any insignia.

== Banner ==
The standard on the right side (to the left of the pole) is made of crimson silk fabric measuring 55 cm x 55 cm. In the center, there is a Polish eagle appliqué made of white cloth. The beak, legs and feathers are embroidered with white silk, while the crown, scepter and orb are embroidered with silver and sequins. Above the eagle, an inscription embroidered with white silk: 'PUŁK PIERWSZY PIECHOTY' (1st Infantry Regiment). The reverse side is made of blue silk fabric, with the same eagle as before in the center, but facing the opposite direction. The inscription is also the same.

On a white silk fabric measuring 95 cm x 80 cm, a French eagle under a crown is painted in gold, but on such a scale and not in the center of the fabric that the fabric appears to have been heavily cropped. The silk bore the inscription: Republique Francaise, and on the reverse: 'Legion Polonaise'. (Note: Major General A. U. Giekkiel, Trofiei woin 1812—1813 gg. chraniaszczijesia w kazanskom soborie, St. Petersburg, 1909, p. 22. Giekkiel probably based his description of the inscription on old museum descriptions.) In 1898 this inscription was not visible.

The above details would indicate that the flag's design has undergone changes and alterations; it probably originally belonged to the Polish Legion battalion in Italy. There is a plaque on the pole. Against a silver background, there are letters and a gilded frame.

== See also ==
- Army of the Duchy of Warsaw
- Kazimierz Małachowski
