= 12th Uhlan Regiment (Duchy of Warsaw) =

12 Uhlan Regiment
- 12 Pułk Ułanów; 5 Pułk Jazdy Galicyjsko-Francuskiej
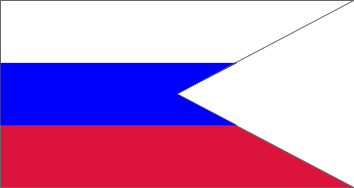
- Lance pennant
- Active: 1809–1813
- Allegiance: Duchy of Warsaw
- Branch: Army
- Type: Uhlan
- Size: 943 soldiers – 1809
- Garrison/HQ: Białej
- Engagements: French invasion of Russia

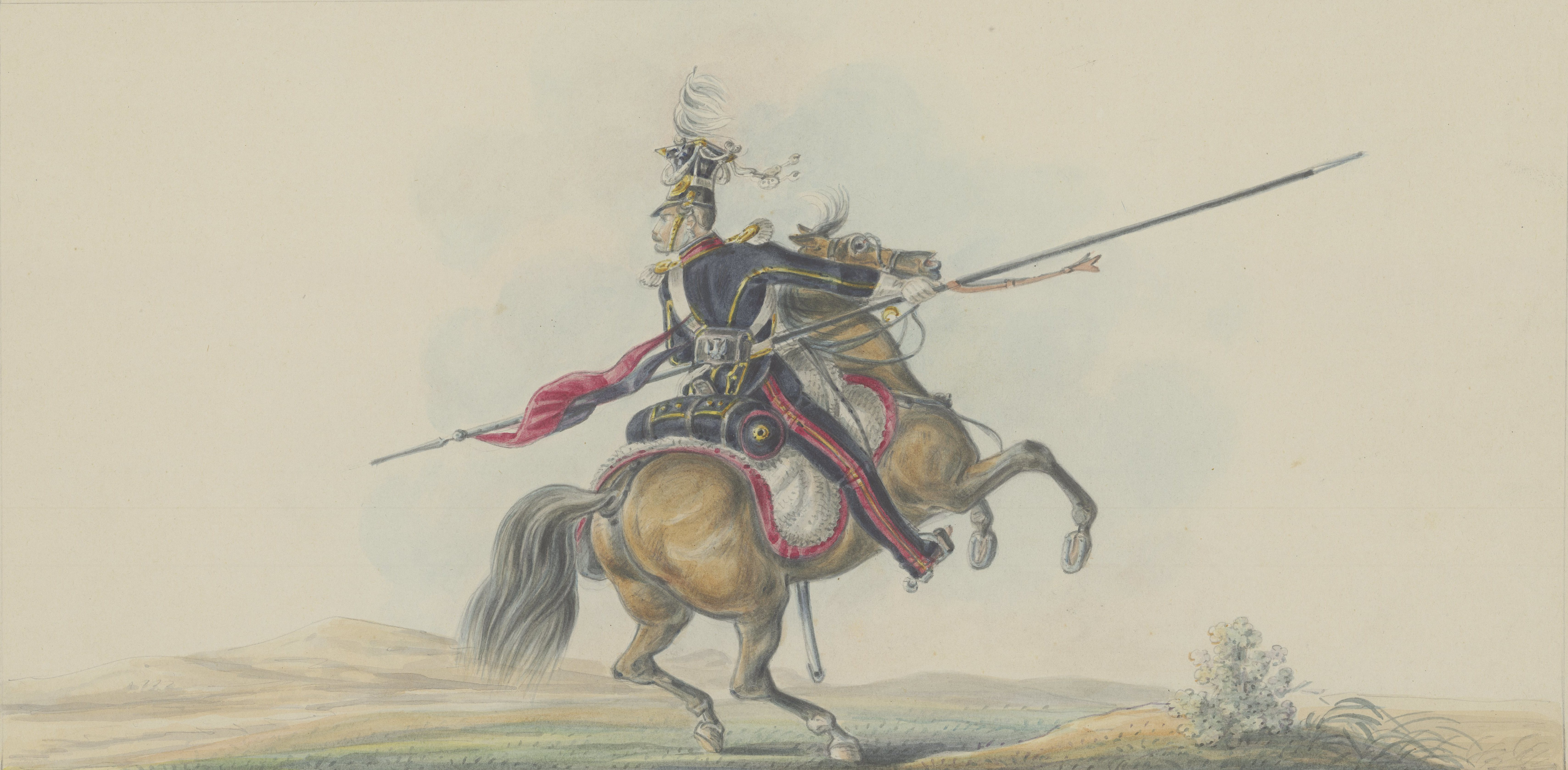
A soldier of the 12th Uhlan Regiment (painting c.1850–60)

12th Uhlan Regiment (Polish: 12 Pułk Ułanów) – was an uhlan regiment in the Army of the Duchy of Warsaw.

== Formation and organisational change ==
The 12th Uhlan Regiment was formed on the 8 June 1809 in Austrian Podolia at the expense of Rzyszczewski and the inhabitants of Russian and Austrian Podolia. Until the 28th December 1809 the regiment was called the 5th Galician-French Cavalry Regiment (Polish: 5 Pułk Jazdy Galicyjsko-Francuskiej). At the end of 1809 the regiment had 943 soldiers. Its garrison was Białej.

== Regimental commanders ==
Regiment commanders:

- Col Gabriel Stanisław Rzyszczewski (1 July 1809)

== Uniform ==
From 1810 onwards the regimental uniform was as follows:

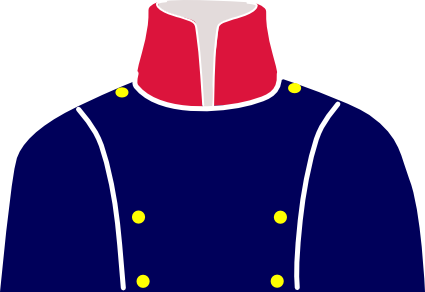
Crimson collar with white piping; navy blue lapels with white piping.

Crimson Lampasse.

== Battles ==
The regiment was involved in the French invasion of Russia.

Battles and skirmishes:

Battles and skirmishes	Date
Grodno	30 June 1812
Romanov	4 July 1812
Borodino	5-7 September 1812
Mir	9-10 July 1812
Chirikov	29 September 1812
Voronovo and Medynia	25 October 1812

== See also ==
- Battle of Mir
- Army of the Duchy of Warsaw
