= Kawalec =

Kawalec is a Polish surname. Notable people with the surname include:

- Jacek Kawalec (born 1961), Polish actor
- Julian Kawalec, Polish writer
- Krzysztof Kawalec (born 1954), Polish historian
- Mieczysław Kawalec (1916–1951), Polish resistance fighter
- Witold Gracjan Kawalec
