= Antoni Potocki (1780–1850) =

Polish noble (1780–1850)

Antoni Norbert Potocki
- Count
- Coat of arms: Pilawa
- Full name: Antoni Norbert Potocki
- Born: 17 June 1780
- Died: 18 October 1850 (aged 70)
- Family: Potocki
- Spouses: Róża Potocka; Izabela Jelska
- Issue: with Róża Potocka; Włodzimierz Stanisław Potocki; Róża Potocka; Przemysław Potocki; Izabela Jelska; Cecylia Potocka; Aniela Potocka; Amelia Potocka; Marta Potocka
- Father: Józef Makary Potocki
- Mother: Ludwika Lubomirska

Count Antoni Norbert Potocki hr. Pilawa (1780–1850) was a Polish nobleman (szlachcic).

He was the son of Józef Makary Potocki and Princess Ludwika Lubomirska, daughter of Prince Stanisław Lubomirski.

Antoni was owner of Monastyryska (Monasterzyska) estates. He became senator–castellan and Brigadier General of the Polish Army.

== Marriage and issue ==
Antoni married Countess Róża Potocka on August 30, 1799 in Tulczyn and had three children:

- Włodzimierz Stanisław Potocki (1800–1820)
- Róża Potocka (1802–1862), married Count Andrzej Artur Zamoyski
- Przemysław Potocki (1805–1847), married Princess Teresa Sapieha

With his second wife Izabella Jelska hr. Pielesz, he had four children:

- Cycylia Potocka (1822–1893), unmarried
- Aniela Potocka (born 1825), unmarried
- Amelia Potocka (1831–1859), unmarried
- Maria Potocka (died 1855), married Włodzimierz Siemiątkowski hr. Jastrzębiec

== Bibliography ==
- Polski Słownik Biograficzny t. 27 s. 792
