= Battle of Mir (1812) =

1812 battle during the French invasion of Russia

- Part of the French invasion of Russia
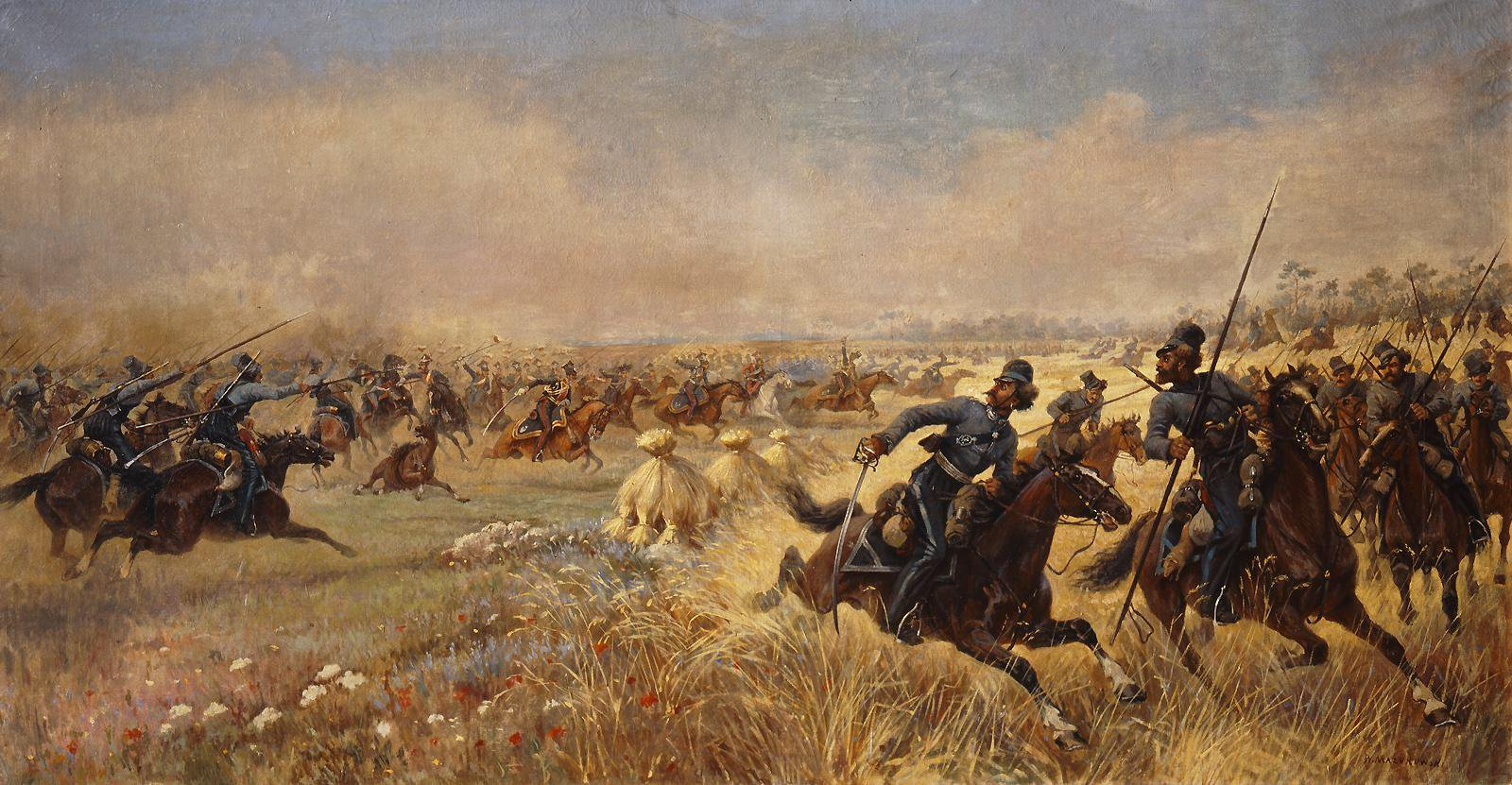
- Cossack cavalry deployed at Mir (by V. Mazurovsky)
Date	9–10 July 1812
Location	Mir, Russian Empire 53°27′N 26°28′E
Result	Russian victory

Belligerents
Duchy of Warsaw	Russia

Commanders and leaders
(Duchy of Warsaw) Aleksander Rożniecki	(Russian Empire) Matvei Platov (Russian Empire) Dmitry V. Vasilchikov

Strength
3,600 men (1,300 on the 1st day), 3 guns: 2nd, 3rd, 7th, 11th, 12th, 15th and 16th Uhlan Regiments; Polish 4th Chasseurs; One horse battery	8,500 men (3,500 on the 1st day), 12 guns: Eleven Cossack regiments (5,000 men); Two Don Cossack batteries, two horse batteries; Akhtyrka Hussars, Kiev, and New Russia Dragoons, Lithuanian Uhlans (2,500 men); 5th Jaegers (1,000 men)

Casualties and losses
308 (1st day); 500–600 (2nd day); 808–908 total losses, including 256 taken prisoner	25 (1st day); Totally around 180 dead and wounded, including two colonels killed.

French invasion of Russia
current battle
Prussian corps
Napoleon
Austrian corps

The Battle of Mir took place on 9 and 10 July 1812 during Napoleon's invasion of Russia. Three Polish Lancers divisions battled against Russian cavalry, ending in the first major Russian victory in the war.

== Battle ==
Russian general Matvei Platov had eight Cossack regiments and two Don batteries deployed south of the village of Mir, when one brigade of the Polish Fourth Light Cavalry attacked his advance posts, numbering about 100 men. These advance posts had the dual job of both observation and sentry duty, and to entice the enemy to attack; ambushes of a hundred men each were set up farther down the road to Mir, on either side of it. The Polish general Alexander Rosniecki's forces clashed with Russian Dmitry Vasilchikov's cavalry, resulting in hand-to-hand combat with fairly even losses. Followed by Uhlans, they swept through the village, attacking Platov's main force. A third Polish brigade attempting to join the fight was encircled and broken by Cossacks, after which the entire Polish force gave ground, driven back with the aid of Russian Hussars. After the arrival of Vasilchikov's Akhtyrka Hussars, Dragoons, and other reinforcements, the battle raged for six hours, shifting to the nearby village of Simiakovo. Platov defeated the enemy there, and moved on to Mir, where he inflicted further losses on the enemy before tactically withdrawing. A complete rout was only averted by Tyszkiewicz's brigade, which covered the Polish retreat.

== Aftermath ==
The town of Mir and fort ruins were used as a headquarters by Jérôme Bonaparte, until he decided on the 16th to leave the army, after quarrels with Vandamme, Davout and with his older brother. After retreating, the Mir Castle was destroyed with gunpowder.

== See also ==
- List of battles of the French invasion of Russia

== Notes ==
Preceded by Battle of Maguilla	Napoleonic Wars; Battle of Mir (1812)	Succeeded by Battle of Ekau
