= Julian Kawalec =

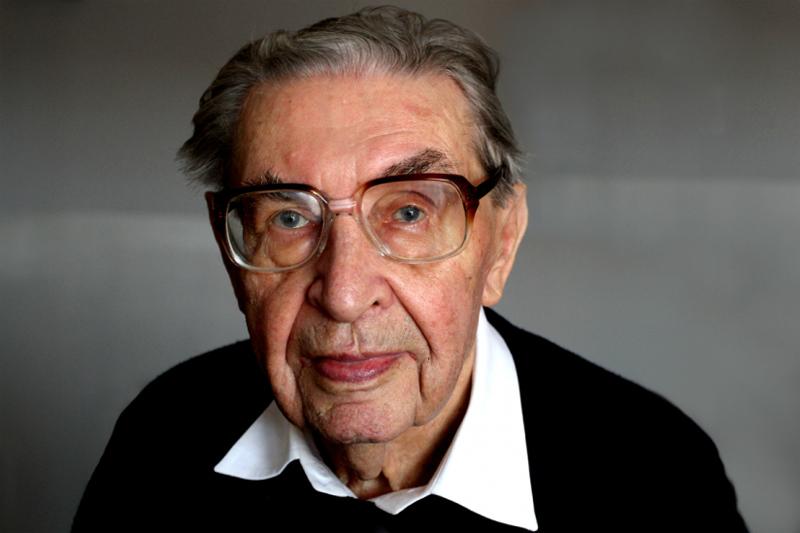
- Born: 11 October 1916; Wrzawy
- Died: 30 September 2014 (aged 97); Kraków, Poland
- Resting place: Rakowicki Cemetery
- Citizenship: Poland
- Education: Jagiellonian University
- Occupations: Writer, publicist
- Writing career
- Notable awards: Order of the Banner of Labour, Gloria Artis Medal for Merit to Culture, Medal of the 40th Anniversary of People's Poland

Julian Kawalec (born October 11, 1916 in Wrzawy, died September 30, 2014 in Kraków) was a Polish prose writer, publicist and poet, and member of the National Council of Patriotic Movement for National Rebirth.

== Biography ==
He was born in the village of Wrzawy near Sandomierz. He was the son of Józef and Stanisława née Bobek – smallholders. After completing five grades of a village primary school, he began studying at an eight-grade Humanities Gymnasium in Sandomierz. This was possible thanks to the enormous effort of his parents and the so-called poverty certificate, which entitled him to discounts on tuition fees.

In 1935, after passing his high school leaving exams, he began studying Polish at the Jagiellonian University in Kraków. During his studies, he supported himself by giving private lessons in Latin and German. He became involved in the folk movement. He was a member of the Polish Academic People's Youth - PAML. In 1938, he was a member of the board of this organization.

The war forced him to interrupt his studies. During the occupation, he stayed in his hometown. He collaborated with the resistance movement and organized secret education. Wanted by the Gestapo, he had to go into hiding.

After the liberation of the areas east of the Vistula, in the autumn of 1944 he was sent by his colleagues from the "Wieś" organization to work at the Polish Press Agency "Pol-Pres" in Lublin, where he served as a war correspondent.

In the autumn of 1945, he returned to Kraków with the intention of continuing his interrupted studies. In 1946, he began working as a journalist in the Kraków press, and then at the Polish Radio. Meanwhile he completed his studies at the Jagiellonian University.

He began his literary work with a collection of short stories entitled Ścieżki między ulice (with illustrations by Józef Wilkoń; Państwowe Wydawnictwo Literatury Dziecięcej "Nasza Księgarnia", Warsaw 1957). He published 22 books, collections of short stories and two volumes of poetry. They have been translated into over 20 languages. The most translated novels are Ziemi przypisane, W słońca, Tańczący jastrząb, Wezwanie, Przepływiesz rzeka, Szara aureola. In his biographical novel W gąszczu bram he included, among other things, memories from his time at the Sandomierz Gymnasium. In 1999 he published Harfa Gorców. The novel has been the basis for films, theatre plays and numerous radio plays.

He was a member of the Polish Writers' Union (since 1960) and the international writers' organisation PEN International and the European Culture Association SEC. In the years 1986–1989 he was a member of the National Grunwald Committee. He was honored with numerous awards, including the State Award of the 1st and 2nd degree (1976, 1986), the Awards of the Ministry of Culture and Art (1967), the publishers', and several times the readers' - "Złoty Kłos" (1968, 1971, 1973 and 1978).

He died on September 30, 2014. He was buried at the Rakowicki Military Cemetery at Prandoty Street in Kraków (section 7 WOJ-płd-11).
