= Józef Makary Potocki =

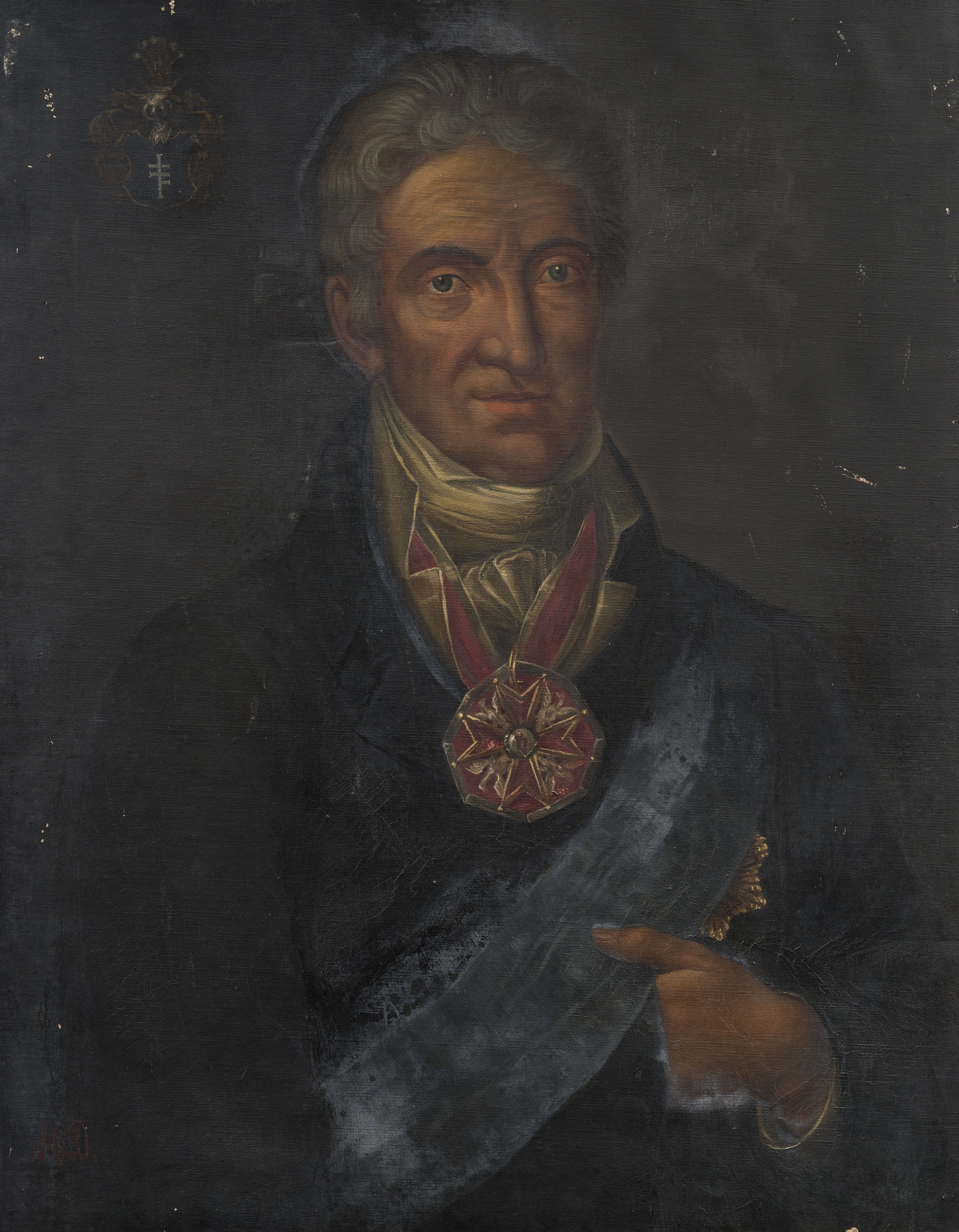
- 19th century portrait of Józef Makary Potocki with insignia of the Order of the White Eagle and the Order of Saint Stanislaus (collection of King John III Museum in Wilanów in Warsaw)
- Coat of arms: Piława
- Born: 1737 (?)
- Died: September 25, 1816 (1821, 1829) (?)
- Noble family: Potocki
- Consorts: Elżbieta Wielopolska; Ludwika Lubomirska
- Father: Józef Potocki
- Mother: Pelagia Potocka

Józef Makary Potocki (born in 1737 (?), died September 25, 1816 (1821, 1829) (?)) was a Polish count, starost of Halych and Czorsztyn, Knight of the Order of the White Eagle and Order of Saint Stanislaus, both awarded on May 1, 1792, the highest Polish orders at that time.

Sources differ on the exact dates of his birth and death. His date of birth is sometimes not stated at all and sometimes given as 1737. Various authors give his date of death as September 25, 1816; 1821; or 1829.

== Life and family ==
Józef Makary Potocki was the starost of Halych and Czorsztyn between 1771 and 1781 and owned the Monastyryska estate. According to his grandson, Polish writer Leon Potocki (1799–1864), who described him in his memoir Urywek ze wspomnień pierwszéj mojéj młodości (1876), Józef Makary Potocki was a member of the Sejm of the Polish–Lithuanian Commonwealth in the reign of August III Sas and Stanisław August Poniatowski; historian Henry Neumüller also stated in 2021 that he was a member of the Sejm. Leon Potocki wrote that Józef Makary Potocki resided in Warsaw with his wife for a few years at the beginning of the reign of Stanisław August Poniatowski and then moved to Monastyryska.

As starost of Czorsztyn he played a positive role in rebuilding the district after the devastation caused by peasant rebellions and arranged for the signing of an agreement between the peasants and the starost’s office, which was approved by the Polish King in 1768. His efforts to rebuild and develop the district were thwarted by the Partitions of Poland.

As starost of Halych and Czorsztyn he became the owner of two castles, Halych Castle and Czorsztyn Castle, the first partly in ruin and the second in disrepair. After the First Partition of Poland (1772), when his administrative districts were annexed by the Habsburg monarchy, he voluntarily relinquished all rights to Halych Castle, faced with possible financial liabilities if the building collapsed and caused damage to the inhabitants of the town. He had no sufficient funds to renovate the massive Czorsztyn Castle and it became the property of the Austrian Empire at the beginning of the 19th century.

He married Elżbieta Wielopolska (1747–1771) in 1767 and Ludwika Lubomirska in 1775. He had five children with Lubomirska: Stanisław Potocki, Wiktoria Potocka, Elzbieta Potocka, Antoni Potocki and Ludwika Potocka.

His 19th century portrait with the insignia of the Order of the White Eagle and the Order of Saint Stanislaus is preserved in the collection of King John III Museum in Wilanów in Warsaw (oil on canvas, 76.0 cm x 58.0 cm).
