= 16th Uhlan Regiment (Duchy of Warsaw) =

16 Uhlan Regiment
- 16 Pułk Ułanów; 7 Pułk Jazdy Galicyjsko-Francuskiej
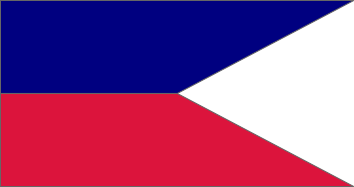
- Lance pennant
- Active: 1809 - 1813
- Allegiance: Duchy of Warsaw
- Branch: Army
- Type: Uhlan
- Size: 661 soldiers - 1809
- Garrison/HQ: Lublin
- Engagements: Polish-Austrian War; French invasion of Russia

Commanders
- Colonel of the Regiment: Col. Marcin Tarnowski

The 16 Uhlan Regiment (Polish: 16 Pułk Ułanów) – was an uhlan regiment in the Army of the Duchy of Warsaw.

The regiment was formed on the 28th December 1809 in Podolia Originally named the 7th Galician-French Cavalry Regiment (Polish: 7 Pułku Jazdy Galicyjsko-Francuskiej), and then renamed the 16th Uhlan Regiment. Lublin was designated as the garrison town for the 16th Uhlan Regiment. At the end of 1809 the regiment numbered at 661 soldiers.

== Uniform ==
From 1810 onwards the uniform of the regiment was as follows:

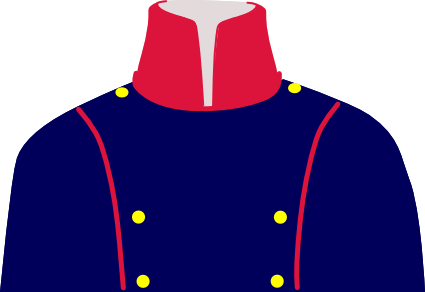
Crimson collar; navy blue trimmings with crimson piping

Crimson Lampasse

== Regimental commanders ==
The regiment commanders were as follows:

Col. Marcin Tarnowski (1st October 1809)

== Battles and skirmishes ==
The regiment took part in the Austro-Polish War, the French invasion of Russia and War of the Sixth Coalition.

Battles and skirmishes:

Battles and skirmishes	Date
Ternopil	3 July 1809
Chorostkowem	13 July 1809
Mir	9-10 July 1812
Rochaczew	10 August 1812
Smolensk	17 August 1812
Borodino	7 September 1812
Borisov	21 November 1812
Bereznia	27 November 1812
Hellensdorfem	14 September 1813
Petersvald	16 September 1813
Pirna	17 September 1813
Sere	18 September 1813
Liepzig	16-19 October 1813

== See also ==
- Battle of Mir
- Army of the Duchy of Warsaw
