= 3rd Uhlan Regiment (Duchy of Warsaw) =

3rd Ulhan Regiment
- 3 Pułk Ułanów
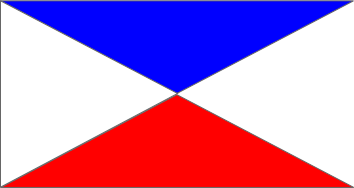
- Lance pennant
- Active: 1806-1813
- Disbanded: 1813
- Country: Duchy of Warsaw
- Branch: Army of the Duchy of Warsaw
- Type: Cavalry
- Part of: 2nd Division
- Garrison/HQ: Sieradz - 1807
- Engagements: War of the Fourth Coalition; Austro-Polish War; French invasion of Russia; War of the Sixth Coalition

Commanders
- Notable commanders: Wojciech Męciński; Józef Benedykt Łączyński; Augustyn Trzecieski; Aleksander Radzimiński; Aleksander Oborski

The 3rd Uhlan Regiment (Polish: 3 Pułk Ułanów) – is an Uhlan Regiment in the Army of the Duchy of Warsaw.

== Organisational history ==
The 3rd Uhlan Regiment was formed in 1806. After the end of combat operations, in accordance with the order of 10 August 1807, Colonel Łączyński's 3rd Uhlan Regiment was stationed in Sieradz. The regiment also fought in the French invasion of Russia and the War of the Sixth Coalition. At the end of 1809 the regiment had 1015 soldiers.

== Commanders ==
The commanders of the regiment were:

- Col. Wojciech Męciński (11 June 1807),
- Col. Józef Łączyński (mid 1808)
- Col. Tyszkiewicz
- Col. Augustyn Trzecieski (19 April 1812)
- Col. Aleksander Radzimiński (7 September 1812)
- Col. Aleksander Oborski (18 January 1813).

== Uniform ==
Until 1809, the regiment had the colours of the 2nd Division. The collar and lapels on the chest and sleeves were crimson with white or silver accents.

From 1810, the following uniform colours were in force:

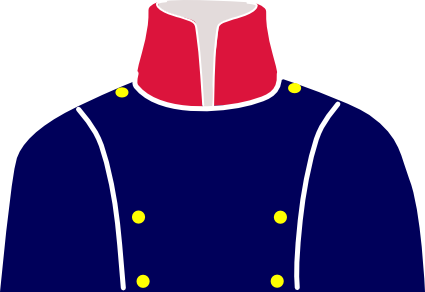
Crimson collar with white piping. Navy blue lapels with white piping.

Crimson lapels

== Battles ==
The regiment took part in the fighting during the war of the Fourth Coalition, Austro-Polish War, French invasion of Russia and war of the Sixth Coalition.

In the Austro-Polish War, the 3rd Uhlan Regiment squadron, commanded by Piotr Strzyżewski, fought in the battle of Radzymin on the 26 and 27 of September 1809.

Battles and skirmishes of the regiment:

| Battles and Skirmishes | Date |
|---|---|
| Szczytno | 13 April 1807 |
| Passenheim | 3 and 30 May 1807 |
| Ortelsburg | 9 May 1807 |
| Defence of Częstochowa | 1809 |
| Nadarzyn | 14,17 and 19 April 1809 |
| Grójec | 18 April 1809 |
| Raszyn | 19 April 1809 |
| Grochów | 24 April and 2 May 1809 |
| Słupca | 4 May 1809 |
| Wielatów | 11 May 1809 |
| Siege of Zamośc | 15–20 May 1809 |
| Zawady | 16 May 1809 |
| Zaleszczyki | 18 June 1809 |
| Horodenka, Ternopil | 14 July 1809 |
| Chorostków, Wieniawka | 20 July 1809 |
| Mir | 10 July 1812 |
| Borodino | 7 September 1812 |
| Gross-Schweidnitz | 3 September 1813 |
| Altenburg | 2 October 1813 |
| Penig | 7 October 1813 |
| Leipzig | 18 October 1813 |

== See also ==
- Battle of Mir
- Army of the Duchy of Warsaw
- 2nd Division
