= 3rd Infantry Regiment (Duchy of Warsaw) =

- 3 Pułk Piechoty
- Active: 1806 - 1814
- Disbanded: 1814
- Allegiance: Duchy of Warsaw
- Branch: Army
- Type: Infantry
- Size: 2647 soldiers - 1809
- Part of: 1st Division - 1811; 16th Division of Józef Zajączek - 1812
- Garrison/HQ: Warsaw

The 3rd Infantry Regiment (Polish:3 pułk piechoty) (Note: Initially as the 11th Infantry Regiment. By order of the Minister of War, Prince Józef Poniatowski, dated 4 June 1807, the unit was renamed the 3rd Infantry Regiment) – was an infantry regiment in the Army of the Duchy of Warsaw.

== Formation ==
The regiment was formed in December 1806. Feliks Kretkowski, a provincial general from the time of the Kościuszko Uprising, was appointed its commander. The foundations of the regiment were laid in Łęczyca, and Lieutenant August Komorowski was put in charge of organising the regiment's infantry; however, due to his ill health, from mid-December 1806 onwards these soldiers were trained by Major Wincenty Podczaski.

== Organisation ==
In 1808 it was stationed at Warsaw. At the end of 1809 it numbered 2647 soldiers. According to the 1810 establishment, the regiment consisted of a 27-strong staff and three infantry battalions, each comprising six companies. The battalion staffs were to consist of 4 officers, and the companies of 136 soldiers. In total, the regiment was to have 2,487 soldiers. In reality, the unit's strength was slightly lower.

In accordance with Napoleon's order of 17 May 1811, three divisions were formed within the Duchy of Warsaw. The regiment became part of the 1st Division.

During preparations for the French invasion of Russia, the regiment was incorporated into the 16th Division commanded by Józef Zajączek, part of the 5th Corps of Prince Józef Poniatowski's Grande Armée

After the abdication of Napoleon, Tsar Alexander I agreed to allow the Polish troops to return home. They were to form the basis for the creation of the Army of Congress Poland under the leadership of Grand Duke Constantine. On the 13 of June 1814 The regiment was assigned a staging area in Kalisz.

== Regimental officers ==
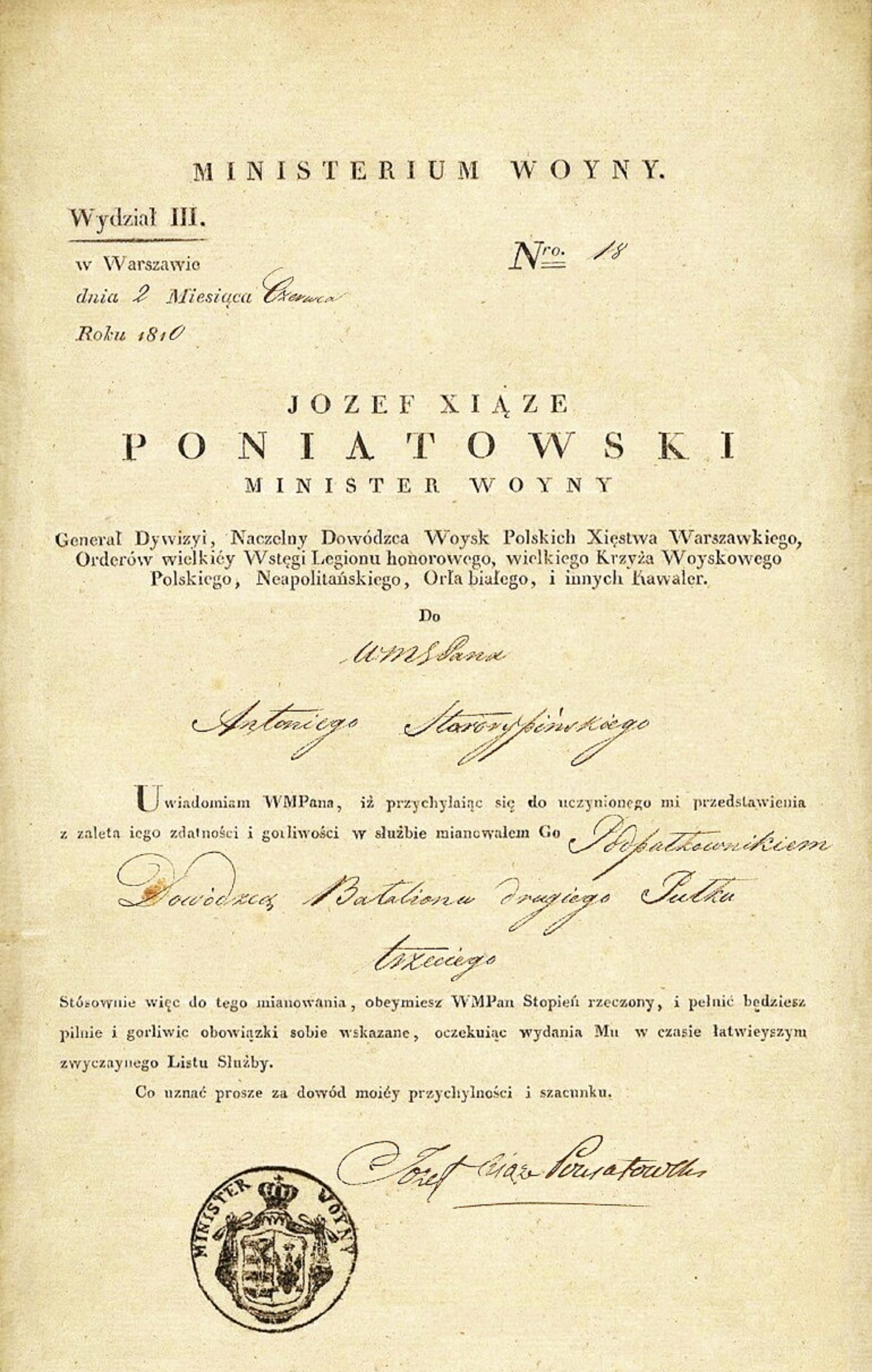
The appointment of Antoni Starorypiński as Lieutenant Colonel and commander of the 2nd Battalion

The commanders of the regiment were:

- Col. Edward Żółtowski (From March 2 1807),
- Col. Kalikst Zakrzewski (From December 27 1811),
- Col. Ignacy Blumer (From August 19 1812),
- Col. Antoni Starorypiński (From 1813). From 2 June 1810, Lieutenant Colonel and commander of the 2nd Battalion of the 3rd Infantry Regiment of the Duchy of Warsaw.

== Battles and skirmishes ==
The regiment took part in the War of the Fourth Coalition, Polish-Austrian War, French invasion of Russia and the War of the Sixth Coalition

Battles and skirmishes:

Battles and skirmishes	Date
Nibork	1807
Dobre Miasto, Wały	5 April 1807
Raszyn	19 April 1809
Zamość	18 May 1809
Sandomierz	27, 28 May and 6, 15 and 16 June 1809
Jankowice	6 June
Smolensk	17 August 1812
Borodino	7 September 1812
Chirikov	29 September 1812
Czeczerynka	4 October 1812
Studzianka	29 November 1812
Wachau and Leipzig	October 18-19 1813
the sieges of Modlin and Zamość.	
