= Wincenty Aksamitowski =

Wincenty Aksamitowski (September 15, 1760 – January 13, 1828) was a Polish artillery officer who rose to the rank of General, serving with the Polish army and French army during the Napoleonic Wars. He was born in Nagórzany near Kamieniec Podolski, Poland, and died in Warsaw.

In 1802 as commander of the 2nd Polish Legion, he was involved in uncovering an anti-French Masonic plot which had been instigated by the Neapolitan brigade commander H. M. Aurora. Although this damaged his reputation in the eyes of his men, it did facilitate the transfer of his unit to the French armies payroll. However this came with a price: they were transferred to Haiti. Aksamitowski however did not accompany them.

He was appointed Chief of Brigade in 1803, and Brigadier General in 1806. He was given command of the artillery of the Grand Duchy of Warsaw in 1806. In 1808, he was appointed a staff officer in the Grande Armée in the 3rd Corps of Louis-Nicolas Davout, and then commanded a brigade of the 1st Polish Legion in the Armée d'Allemagne attached to the 3rd Corps. In 1813, he commanded a cavalry brigade and was a member of Joachim Murat's personal staff.

== Bibliography ==
- R. Bielecki – Encyklopedia wojen Napoleońskich, Warszawa 2002
- Henryk P. Kosk – Generalicja polska, tom I, Oficyna Wydawnicza "Ajaks", Pruszków 2001, ISBN 83-87103-81-0
- Jan Pachoński, Oficerowie Legionów Polskich 1796–1807, część II: Słownik biograficzny oficerów Legionów Polskich 1796-1807 (do druku przygotowali Kamil Stepan i Adam Roliński), Fundacja Centrum Dokumentacji Czynu Niepodległościowego, Księgarnia Akademicka, Kraków 1998–2003, s. 4-6
