= Velikiy Knyaz Konstantin =

Velikiy Knyaz Konstantin (Russian: Великий Князь Константин) or Grand Duke Constantine may refer to:

- One of several Russian Grand Dukes of the Royal House of Romanov, see Konstantin Romanov (disambiguation)
- Fort Grand Duke Constantine (Russia), a fort defending Kronstadt, Russia

== Ships ==
- Russian tender Veliky Knyaz Konstantin, a torpedo boat tender of the Russian Navy launched in 1857
- Velikiy Knyaz Konstantin, a 120-gun ship of the line of the Russian Black Sea Fleet, launched 1852, which participated in the Battle of Sinop
