= Wrzawy =

- Village
- Church of Blessed Virgin Mary, Queen of Poland

- Location within Poland
- Coordinates: 50°43′N 21°51′E
- Country: Poland
- Voivodeship: Subcarpathian
- County: Tarnobrzeg
- Gmina: Gorzyce

Population
  - Total: 1,572
- Time zone: UTC+1 (CET)
  - Summer (DST): UTC+2 (CEST)
- Vehicle registration: RTA

Wrzawy [ˈvʐavɨ] is a village in the administrative district of Gmina Gorzyce, within Tarnobrzeg County, Subcarpathian Voivodeship, in south-eastern Poland.

Wrzawy is the birthplace of the former First Lady of Poland (1995–2005), Jolanta Kwaśniewska.

== History ==
The local Catholic parish was noted in 1326–1328. As of 1531, the village was administratively located in the Lublin Voivodeship. On 13 June 1809, it was the site of a battle between Poles and Austrians.

During the German occupation of Poland (World War II), the Polish resistance was active in the area. On 14 October 1943, the Home Army successfully raided a German police station in Wrzawy.
