= Kazimierz Małachowski =

Polish general (1765–1845)

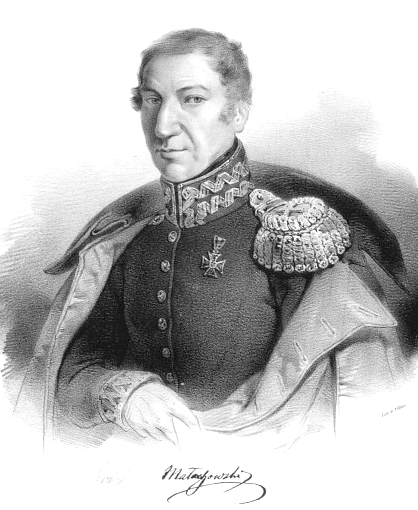
Kazimierz Małachowski

Kazimierz Małachowski of Gryf (1765–1845) was a Polish military officer and a general of both the armed forces of Duchy of Warsaw and the Kingdom of Poland. He served with the Danube Legion in Haiti in 1803, returning to France with the survivors in 1804. He was a colonel by 1812 and commanded a regiment in Jan Henryk Dąbrowski's army corps.

A recipient of Virtuti Militari for his actions during the Napoleonic Wars, he is best remembered as one of the last Commanders-in-Chief of the failed November Uprising. He assumed command shortly after the disastrous battle of Warsaw.
