= Stanisław Florian Potocki =

Polish general

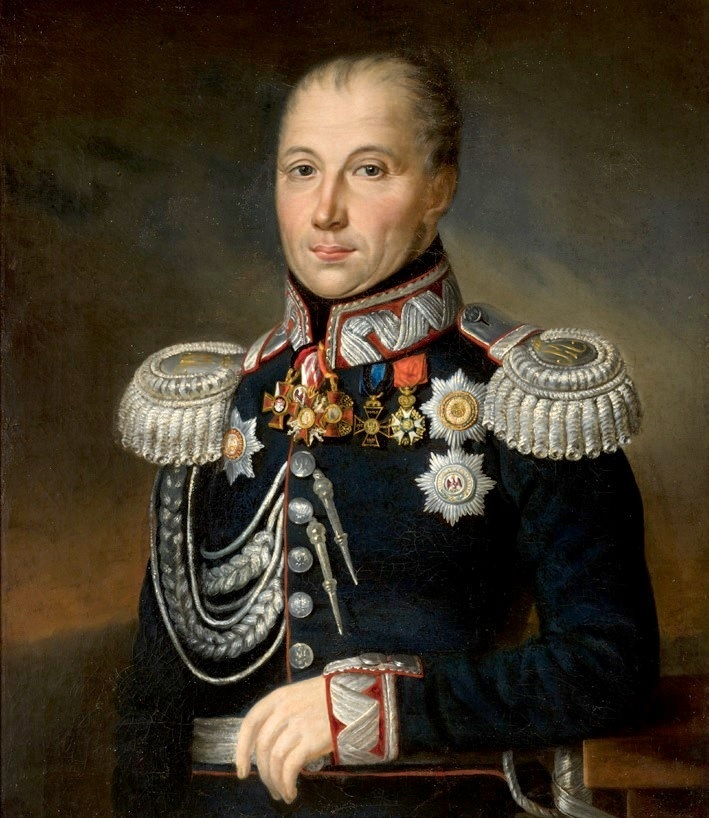
- Born: 6 May 1776; Monastyryska, Polish-Lithuanian Commonwealth
- Died: 30 November 1830 (aged 54); Warsaw, Congress Poland
- Cause of death: Assassination
- Buried: Powązki Cemetery, Warsaw
- Noble family: Potocki
- Father: Józef Makary Potocki
- Mother: Ludwika Lubomirska

Stanisław Florian Potocki alias Staś (6 May 1776 – 30 November 1830) – general of infantry of the Polish Army, senator-voivode of the Congress Poland.

Potocki participated in the Polish–Russian War of 1792, and in the following anti-Russian Kościuszko Uprising in 1794. After Napoleon's entry into Polish lands, he joined the forming Polish Army. He took part in the War of the Fourth Coalition and then in the Austro–Polish War (part of the War of the Fifth Coalition). In 1812, he participated in French invasion of Russia, serving as the chief of staff of the V Corps of the Grande Armée.

He was captured by Russian forces in Warsaw, but after his release, he joined the army of the emerging Congress Poland, aligned by personal union with the Russian Empire. He enjoyed the trust of King and Emperor Nicholas I and was sent on a diplomatic mission to Prussia on his behalf. He was a staunch opponent of the growing anti-Russian conspiracy in Warsaw, which saw him or General Józef Chłopicki as a potential leader of a future uprising. After the outbreak of the uprising on the night of November 29, 1830, he rejected Piotr Wysocki's personal offer of leadership. During the subsequent street fighting, he was beaten, torn apart, and ultimately shot. He died from his wounds later that same day.

== Biography ==
Stanisław Florian Potocki was born into the powerful magnate family of the Potockis, as the son of Józef Makary Potocki and Ludwika née Lubomirski. On July 12, 1789, he entered service in the Crown Artillery, and on January 26 of the following year, he was appointed as a second lieutenant. During the Polish–Russian War of 1792, he served in the unit of General Arnold Byszewski. On June 9, 1792, he was promoted to the rank of lieutenant.

On March 2, 1794, he was arrested by Iosif Igelström for his involvement in a patriotic conspiracy. He regained his freedom on April 18, 1794, at the outbreak of the Warsaw Uprising, in which he immediately took part as an aide-de-camp to General Stanisław Mokronowski. He ended his participation in the uprising with the rank of captain, and after its fall, he went to Italy via Dresden. From there, he returned to his family estate in Monasterzyska, soon moving to Warsaw, where he entered the circle of Prince Józef Poniatowski.

When Napoleon I led the French army into Polish territory, Potocki joined the forming Polish army, taking command of the 2nd Infantry Regiment of the 1st Legion (Warsaw), with the rank of colonel. He fought within Marshal André Masséna’s 5th Corps, defending the crossings over the Narew River. During the war with Austria, he commanded his regiment at the Battle of Raszyn on April 19, 1809, and participated in the fights for the Zamość fortress and the Battle of Wrzawy. On March 20, 1810, he was promoted to brigadier general and appointed commander of the city of Warsaw. He later also took command of the 4th Brigade.

After the organizational incorporation of the Duchy of Warsaw's army into the Grande Armée, Potocki took command of the 2nd Brigade of General Józef Zajączek's 16th Division, and just before the invasion of Russia, he assumed command of the 2nd Brigade of General Ludwik Kamieniecki's 18th Division. For a brief period, he served on the staff of King of Westphalia Jérôme Napoleon I, but then returned to the Polish Corps. He followed the campaign all the way to the Battle of Berezina, and during the retreat, he assumed the duties of chief of staff of the V Corps after General Stanisław Fiszer. He remained in Warsaw, where he was taken prisoner by the Russians in February 1813.

He regained his freedom a year later, and on October 17, 1815, he took command of the 1st Brigade of the 1st Infantry Division of the Congress Poland army. After General Józef Chłopicki's resignation, he took command of the entire division. On September 24, 1826, he was appointed adjutant general to Tsar Nicholas I. In 1827, he temporarily assumed the role of commander of the infantry after the resignation of General Ignacy Krasiński. On May 24, 1829, the day of Nicholas I's coronation in Warsaw as King of Poland, he was confirmed in this position with a promotion to general of infantry.

Stanisław Potocki was aware of the emerging anti-Russian conspiracy in the Polish capital, being close to Grand Duke Konstantin, but also having his own agents. As a result, he took steps to prevent the insurrection from breaking out in Warsaw. Although the conspiracy saw him or General Józef Chłopicki as a potential leader of a future uprising, he never made any such promise. However, for him, too, the outbreak of the Officer Candidate School revolt on November 29, 1830, came as a surprise. The general, on his way to the Belweder, where the Grand Duke was staying, met the rebellious cadets at Three Crosses Square, next to St. Alexander's Church. The conspirators asked the general to take the lead of the rebellion. Piotr Wysocki addressed Potocki with the words: “I beseech you for the love of the fatherland, for the bonds of Igelström, in which you moaned for so long, to stand at our helm. Do not think that the School itself has arisen. The entire army is heading to its posts and is following us.” Potocki replied: “Children, calm down!" And he left despite the pleas of the rebels.

Potocki then headed to Belweder, gathering loose Polish troops along the way and rallying them around Belweder. There, after talking with the Grand Duke, he went to Królewska and Chmielna Streets, where he took a grenadier company of the 6th Regiment of the Line and brought it to Konstantin. In doing so, he arrested Lt. Jozef Przyborowski, who urged the soldiers to step up against the Russians. After capturing the Arsenal, the armed people of Warsaw began to move toward Bank Square. There the Polish units of the 2nd Regiment of Line Infantry, loyal to Konstantin, gathered. Their command was soon assumed by Stanisław Potocki, determined to suppress the uprising with Polish forces and the influence of Polish commanders.

However, the soldiers of the 2nd Regiment, who had gathered in the square, began to hesitate, and some of them began to switch to the side of the insurgents. Potocki struggled to maintain order, but had no chance to take any counteraction. For some time there was a stalemate between the two sides, which was broken by the arrival from Leszno Street of the academics, who captured the Carmelite prison and liberated the prisoners. When the general saw one of them, Szymański, he shouted to the gendarme, “Get me that scoundrel!” The gendarme jumped up and cut Szymański in the hand. At the sight of this, the crowd became enraged, rushed at Potocki and dragged him off his horse. Soldiers with difficulty rescued Potocki, who then, stripped and bruised, without his sword and on foot, took refuge in Count Lubecki's apartment in the Bank Polski building.

Despite this, the rebels of the Officer Candidate School made one more attempt to offer Potocki's leadership, between 10 and 11 p.m., they arrived at the Bank Polski building. Potocki, however, again refused them, although he was aware that death had already been suffered that night by Generals Trębicki, Blumer and Hauke. Against the persuasions of those around him to remain neutral or depart from Bank Square, at around 1 a.m., Potocki went alone in the direction of Bielańska Street, where he encountered privates of the 3rd Regiment. As he began to address them, shots were fired, uncertain whether from the soldiers or from the crowd of civilians. The horse with Potocki's inert body galloped in the opposite direction and dropped the general's body near the Blue Palace. The body was moved to the loco's room and then to Jan Łubieński's apartment on Sentaroska Street, where the general died in severe agony on the evening of November 30, 1830.

== Commemoration ==
Stanisław Florian Potocki was buried in the Powązki Cemetery in Warsaw, in the Potocki family crypt. On his tombstone, the following inscription was engraved: "D.O.M. Here lie the remains of Stanisław Potocki, General of Infantry of the Polish Armies. He died in the year 1830. His death was a reflection of his life, for he died as peacefully as one whose conscience bore no torment, and moments before passing, he uttered these final words: 'I have always been a virtuous man and a good Pole.'" The name of Potocki was also inscribed on the monument erected by the Russian authorities in Warsaw in 1841, honoring the loyalist officers who fell during the November Uprising. The inscription read: "To the Poles who fell on November 17/29, 1830, for their loyalty to their monarch."

Stanisław Potocki was one of the characters in the 1904 play "Noc listopadowa" by Stanisław Wyspiański.

== Family ==
On September 7, 1797, he married Józefa Anna Maria Dowojna-Sołohub in Warsaw, the daughter of Jerzy Dowojna-Sołohub, a councilor of the Permanent Council, and Marianna née Potocka. From this marriage, he had three children: Adela, Leon, Henryk, and Stanisław Józef. Of these, only Leon Potocki reached adulthood and gained fame as a writer and memoirist. After the death of his first wife, he married Marianna Górska on February 22, 1815, the daughter of Kazimierz Górski and Barbara née Kamińska. From this marriage, he had a daughter, Ludwika Józefa, who married Count Konrad Walewski.

== Bibliography ==
- Tokarz, Wacław (1925). Sprzysiężenie Wysockiego i noc listopadowa [Wysocki Conspiracy and November Night] (in Polish). Kraków.
