= Jan Chełmiński =

Polish painter

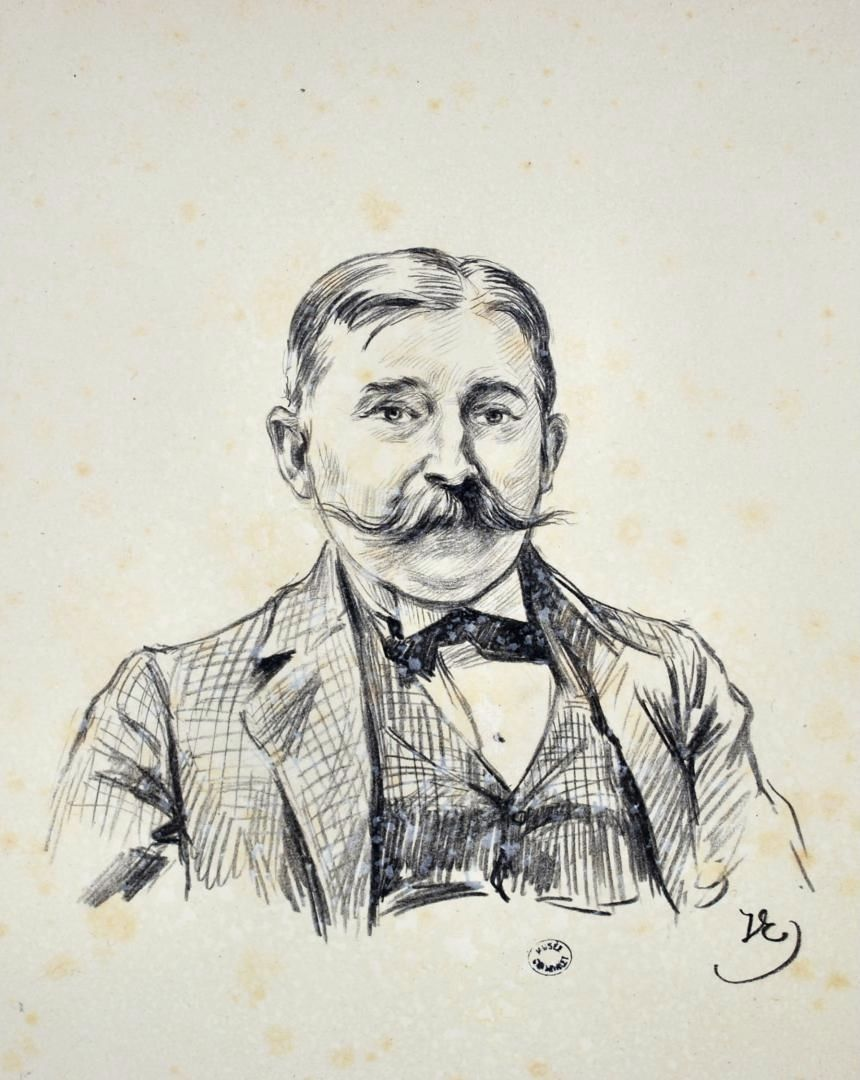
Jan Chełmiński

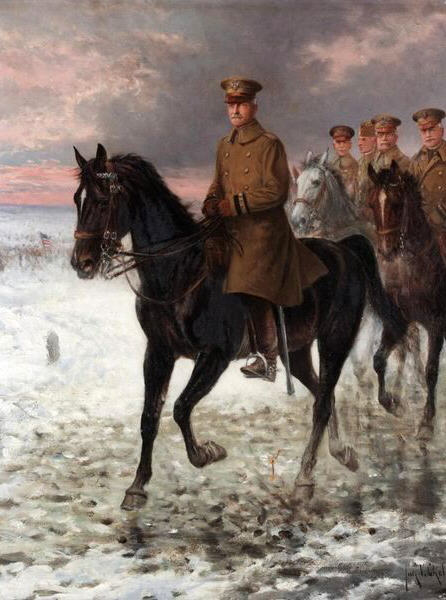
General Pershing by Chełmiński

Jan Chełmiński, also known as Jan van Chelminski, born Jan Władysław Chełmiński (27 January 1851 – 1925), was a Polish painter.

== Life ==
Chełmiński was born in Brzustów. He entered the Munich Academy of Fine Arts on 14 April 1875 (Register: 3144) and worked throughout Europe. From 1895 he lived in New York, though in 1893 he had taken out British citizenship.

He married twice. After divorcing his first wife, Marie Henschel (1858–?), he married Leonie Knoedler, sister of Roland Knoedler, of the famous New York art dealership Knoedler.

Chełmiński was best known in his lifetime for his historical works, especially those dealing with military history and the Napoleonic Wars.

== See also ==
- List of Poles
