= Lampasse =

Trouser stripes on military dress uniforms

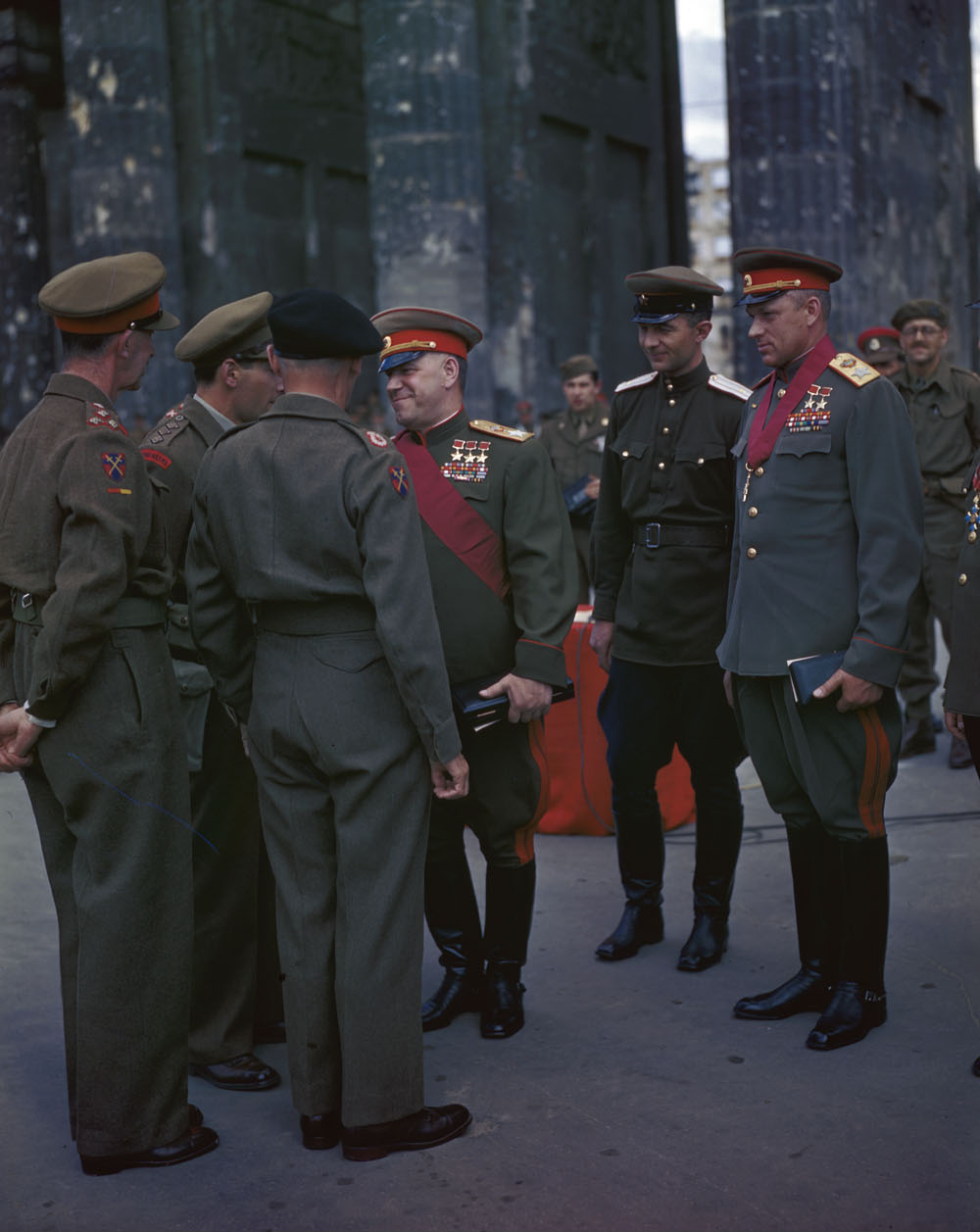
Soviet marshals Zhukov and Rokossovsky with red double lampasses in 1945

Lampasse(s) (German: Lampasse(n)) are trouser stripes adorning the dress uniforms of many armed forces, police, fire and other public uniformed services. In German-speaking countries the uniforms of general staff–qualified officers featured distinctive double-wide lampasses.

For a comparable feature of civilian dress, see galloon.

Ancient Scythians often decorated the seams of their trousers with lampasse-like elements, but the modern fad for lampasses originated in civilian fashion in the early years of the 19th century and soon passed into military use - by 1815 in Prussia, for example.

== Germany ==
The lampasses of the General Staff–qualified officers up to colonel were in carmine. However general uniforms featured lampasses in corps colour (German: Waffenfarbe.), e.g. Air Force in Skyblue.

For general officers of the German Bundeswehr the tradition to use lampasses was given up in 1956. However, general officers of the National People's Army, Volkspolizei and Stasi, as well as flag officers of the Volksmarine wore double-wide lampasses on uniform trousers in the appropriate corps colour until 1990.

See also

In Germany today the general officers of the Bundespolizei wear double-wide Lampasses in deep green. Since 2010 Lampasses are also worn by the police forces of Baden-Württemberg and Bavaria (2017).

== Historical examples ==
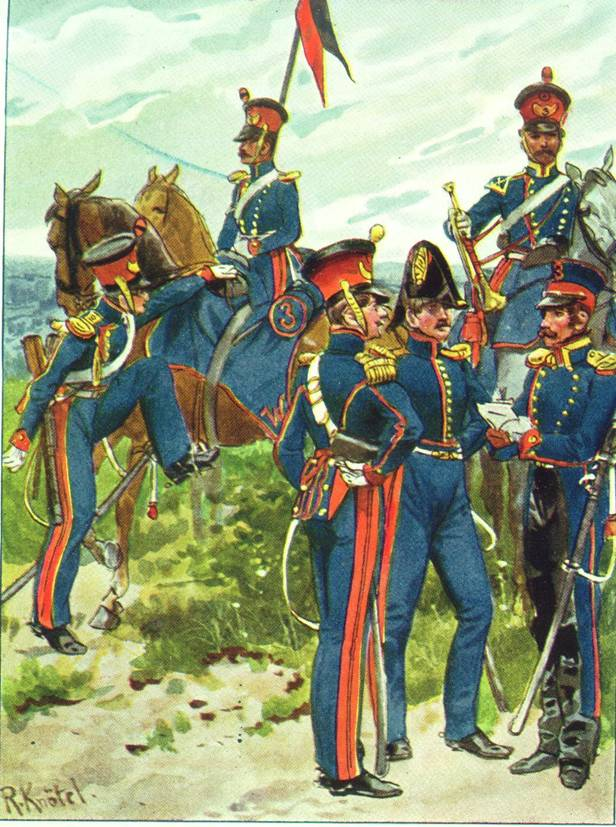
Red double-wide lampasses of the Wuerttemberg 3rd Kavalery-Regiment, 1825.

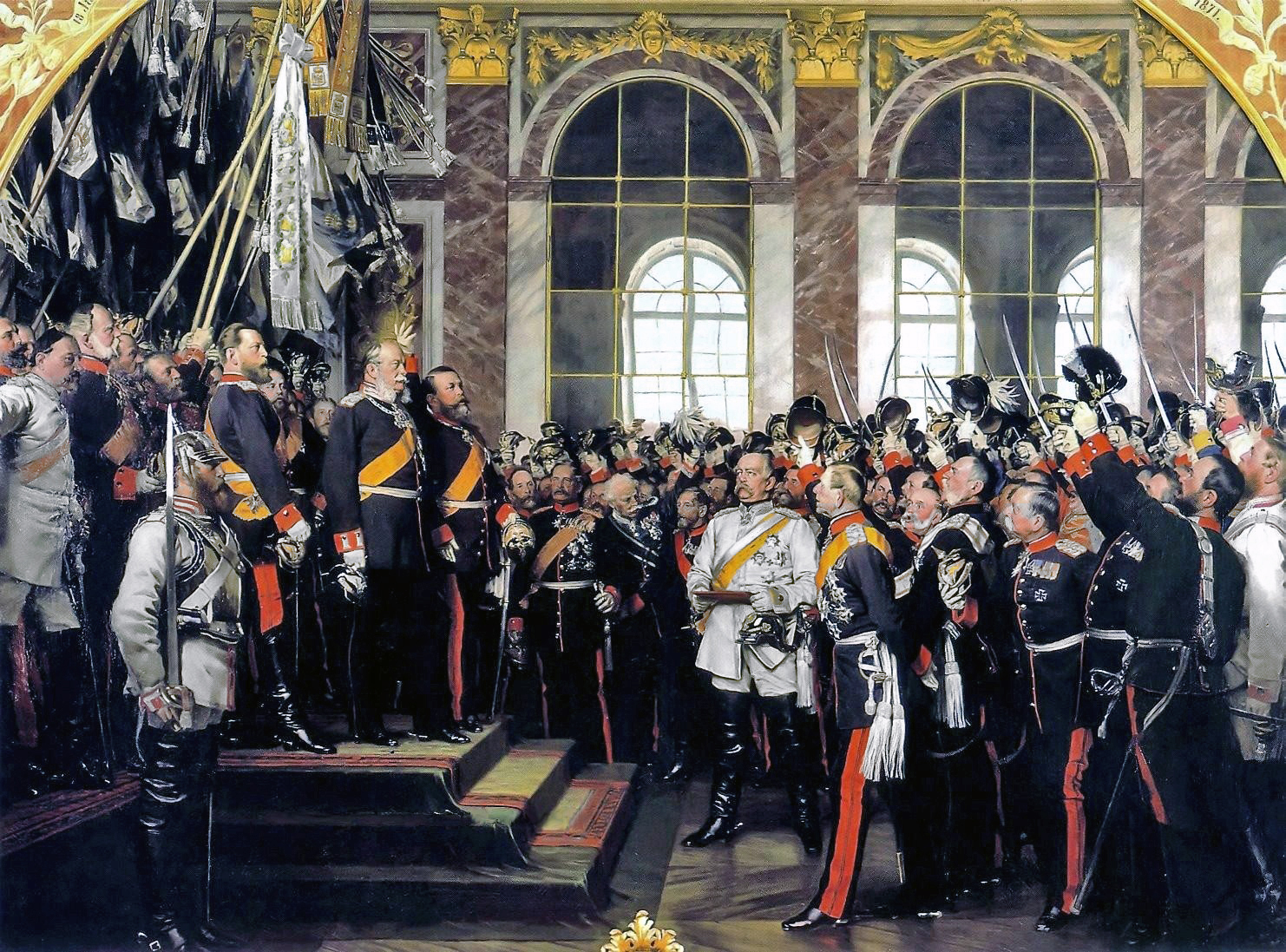
Red double-wide lampasses of the Prussian General officers.

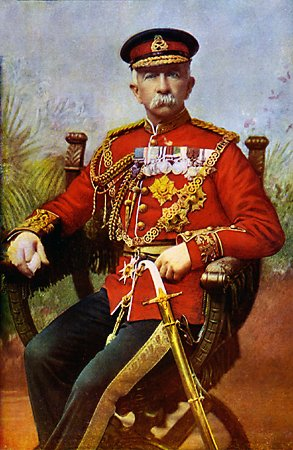
Field Marshal Sir Henry Evelyn Wood VC, GCB, GCMG with gold-lampasses.

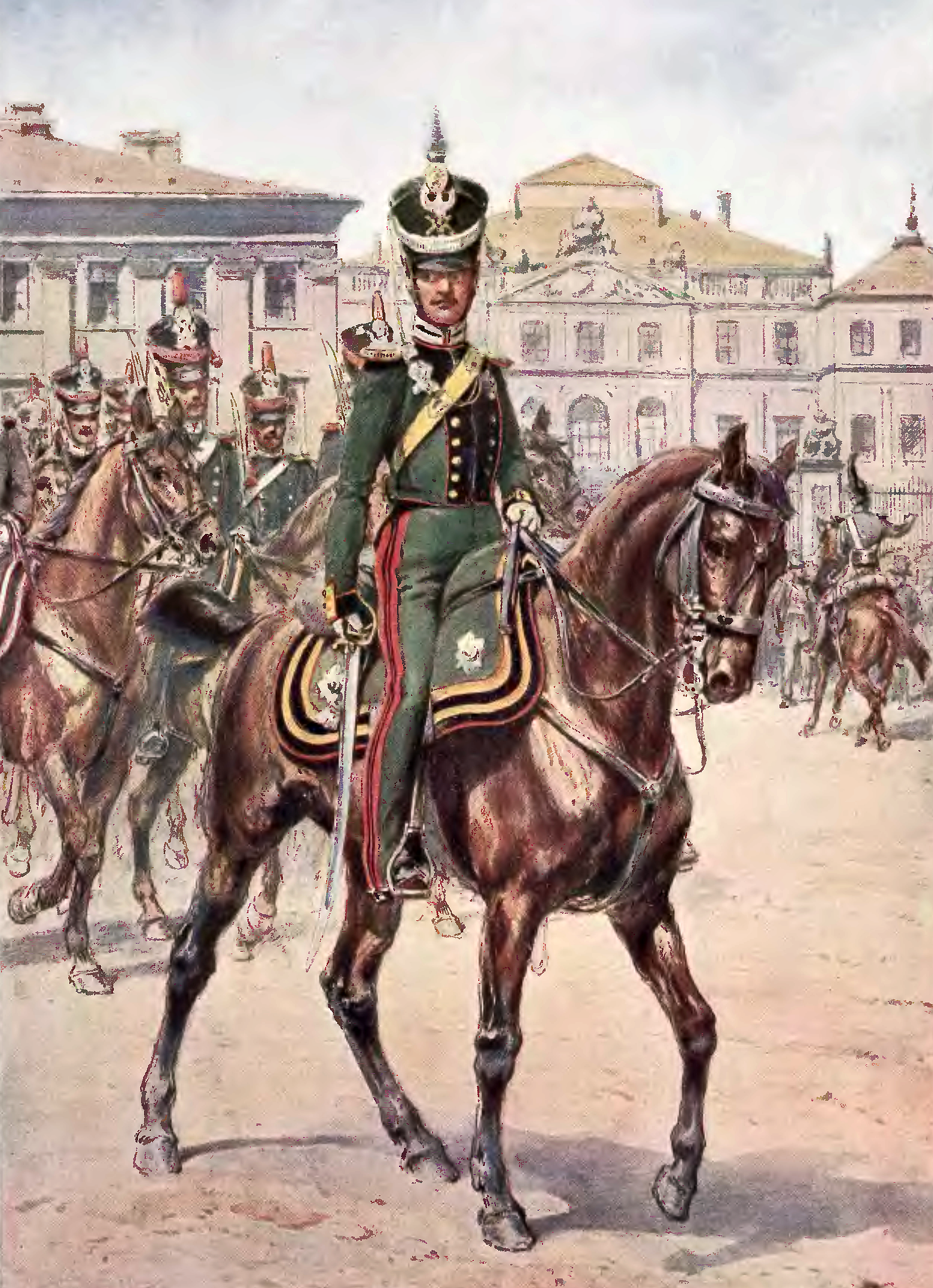
Mounted officer with red lampasses.

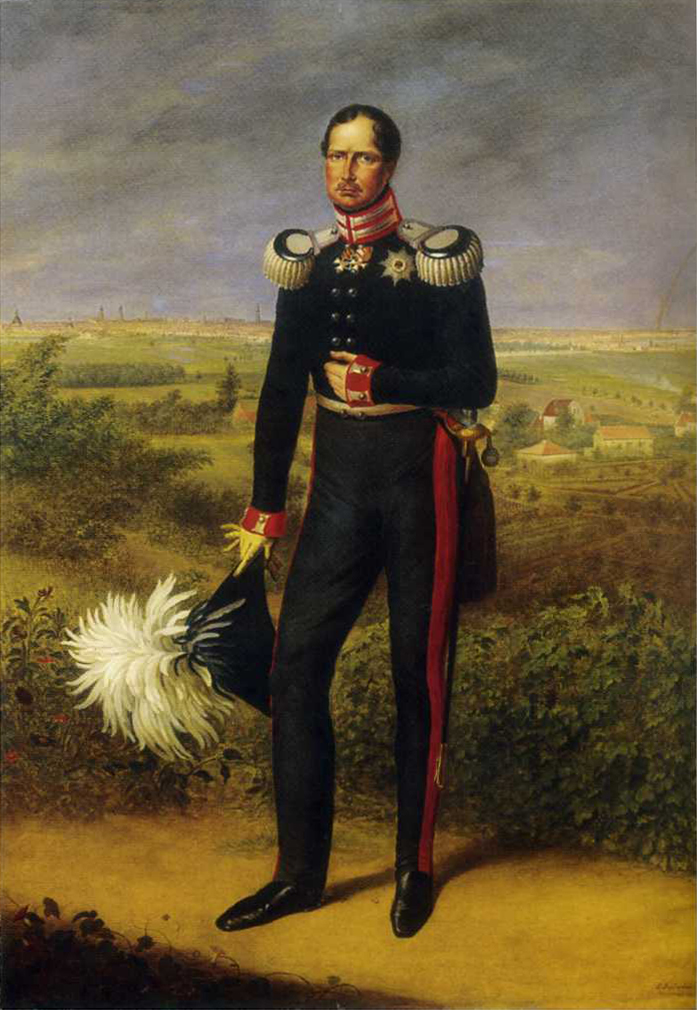
Friedrich Wilhelm III with red double-lampasses.

== Lampasses today ==
Lampasses are worn even today in a large number of national armed forces on dress uniform, full dress uniform, or duty uniform of general officers. The gold coloured lampasses of the US Cavalry are also well known.

== See also ==
- Waffenfarbe
- Blood stripe
