= Galician Uprising (1809) =

- Part of the Austro-Polish War
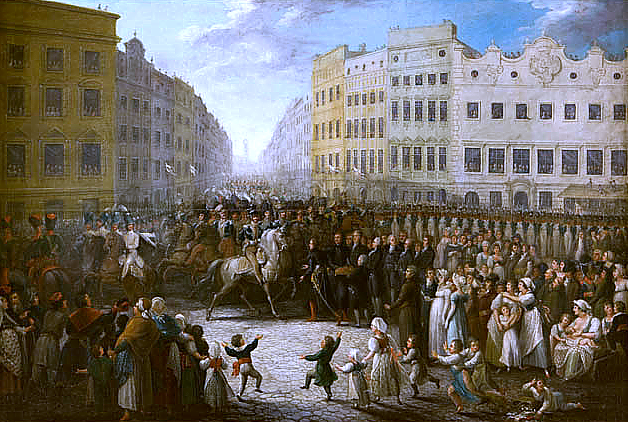
- The entry of Polish troops into Krakow on July 15, 1809, painting by Marcin Stachowicz
Date	5 May 1809 – 18 July 1809
Location	West Galicia, Eastern Galicia
Result	Polish victory
Territorial changes	Part of Galicia annexed by the Duchy of Warsaw

Belligerents
Duchy of Warsaw	Austrian Empire

Commanders and leaders
(Duchy of Warsaw) Piotr Strzyżewski (Duchy of Warsaw) Stanisław Kostka Zamoyski	(Austrian Empire) Archduke Ferdinand (Austrian Empire) Christian Wurmser

Strength
6,000–7,000 soldiers	15,000 soldiers

Casualties and losses
Unknown	Unknown

The Galician Uprising of 1809 was a Polish armed uprising against the Austrian Empire led by Piotr Strzyżewski during the Polish-Austrian War. The rebellion ended with an Insurgent military victory.

== Background ==
The territory of Galicia has been under the Austrian Control since 1772. The creation of Duchy of Warsaw led to the idea of an armed uprising being more popular among the population.

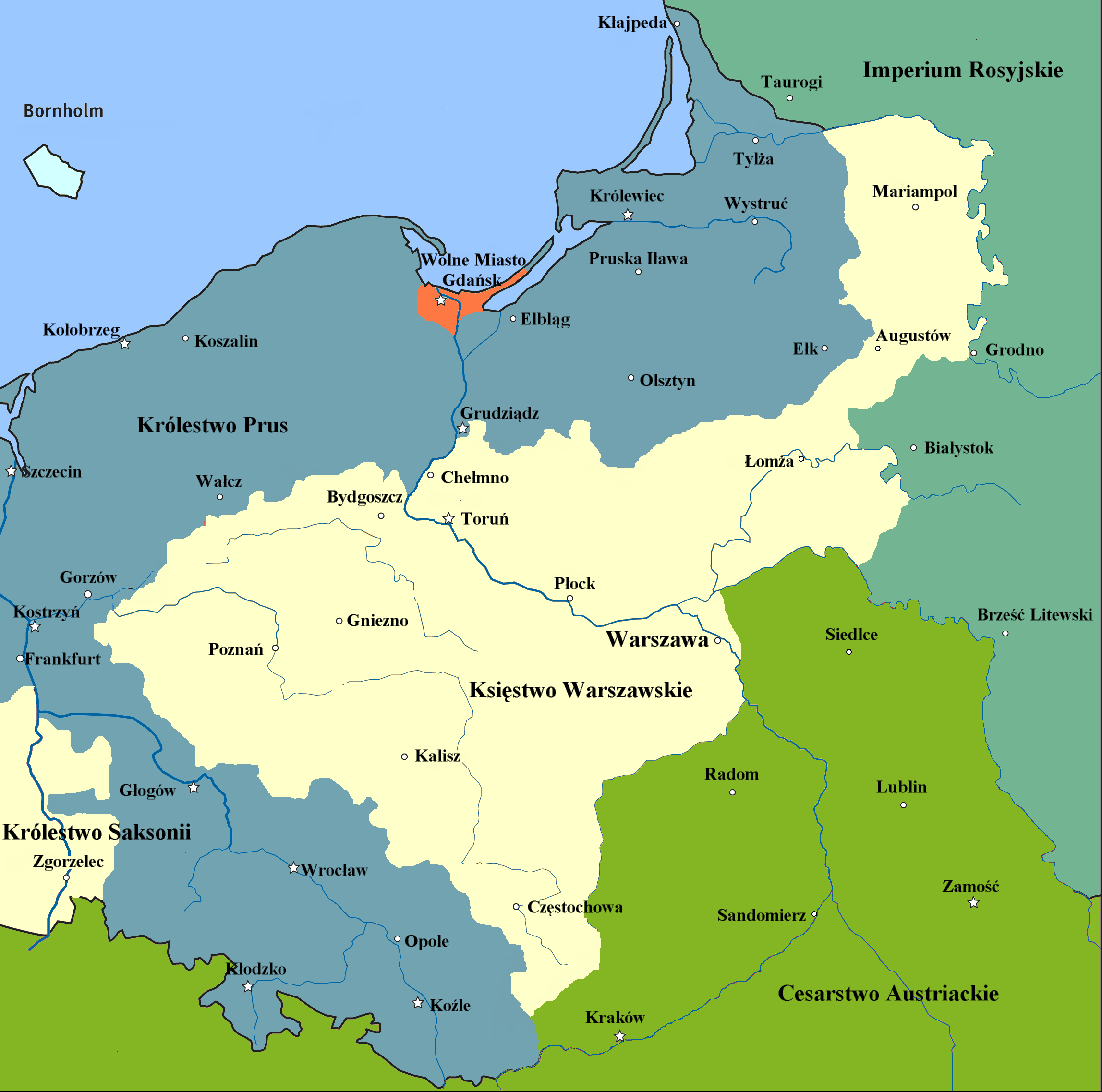
Duchy of Warsaw 1807–1809

After the Battle of Raszyn the Austrian forces captured Warsaw, forcing Józef Poniatowski to retreat and assume defensive positions on The Vistula River. The Austrian forces failed to defeat Poniatowski's defences, which allowed his army to use that situation to capture many cities (such as: Kock, Lublin, Sandomierz and Zamość), including Lviv, which became the headquarters of the Provisional Central Military Government of Galicia.
