= The Death of Cyprian Godebski at Raszyn =

Painting by January Suchodolski

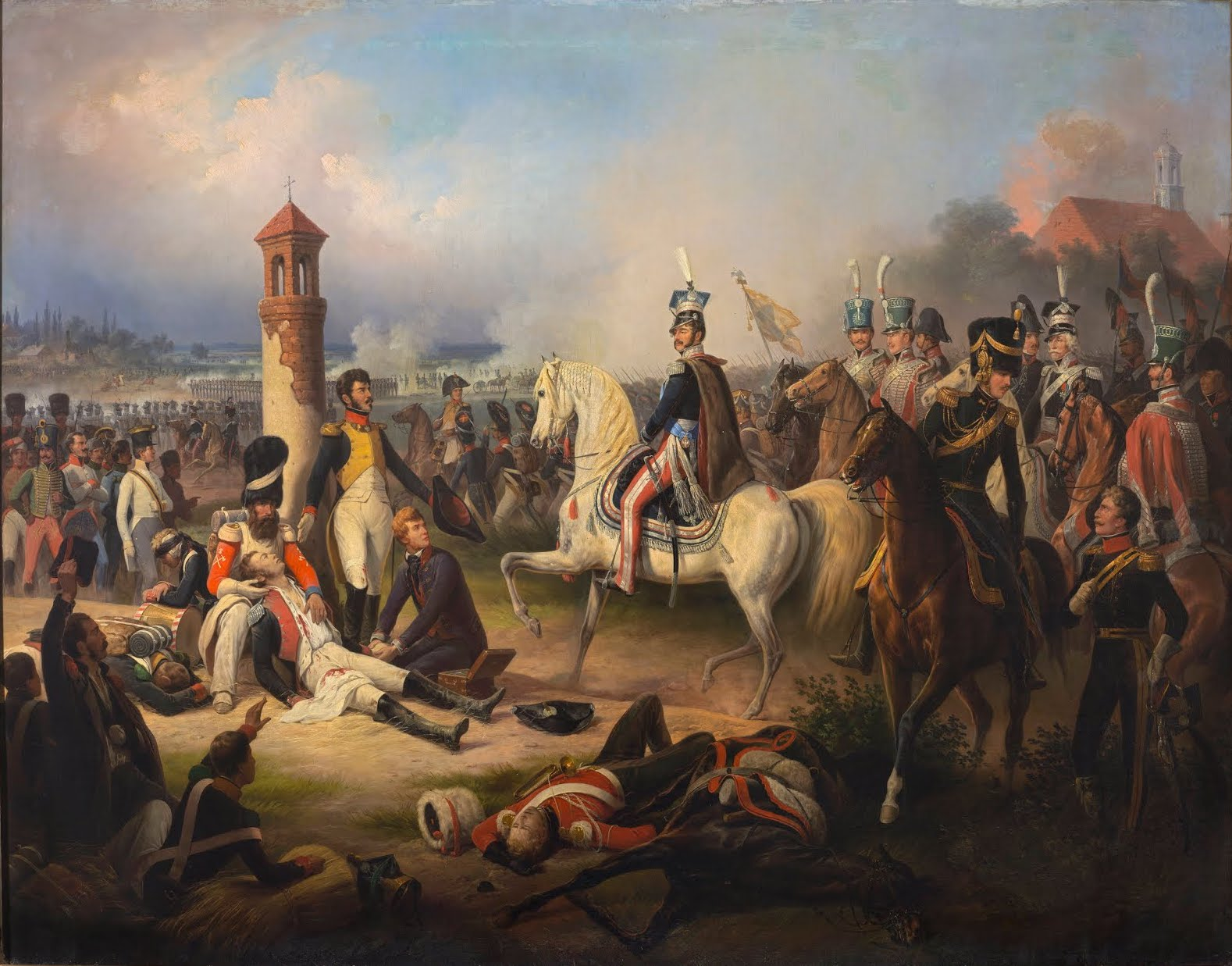
- Artist: January Suchodolski
- Year: 1855
- Type: Oil on canvas, history painting
- Dimensions: 140 cm × 185 cm (55 in × 73 in)
- Location: National Museum, Warsaw

The Death of Cyprian Godebski at Raszyn is an 1855 history painting by the Polish artist January Suchodolski. It depicts the Battle of Raszyn on 19 April 1809 during the Napoleonic Wars, specifically the death of the Polish writer and soldier Cyprian Godebski. At the outbreak of the War of the Fifth Coalition, Austria launched an invasion of the French-backed Grand Duchy of Warsaw. Polish forces of the Grand Duchy led by Józef Poniatowski rallied against them at Raszyn. Although this did not prevent Austria from occupying Warsaw they were able to take the offensive again as Napoleon invaded Austria and took Vienna.

Poniatowski rides on horseback in the centre of the scene, while Godebski having been fatally wounded is shown dying a heroic death in the style reminiscent of Benjamin West's The Death of General Wolfe. Suchodolski was a noted painter of battle scenes, who had been a pupil of Horace Vernet. Today the painting is in the collection of the National Museum in Warsaw.

== See also ==
- The Death of Prince Poniatowski by Horace Vernet, a depiction of the death of Poniatowski at the Battle of Leipzig in 1813

== Bibliography ==
- Czubaty, Jaroslaw. The Duchy of Warsaw, 1807-1815: A Napoleonic Outpost in Central Europe. Bloomsbury Publishing, 2017.
- Kobielski, Dobrosław. Pejzaże dawnej Warszawy. Wydawn. Artystychno-Graficzne, 1974.
- Wałek, Janusz. A History of Poland in Painting. Interpress, 1988.
