= Raszyn =

- Village
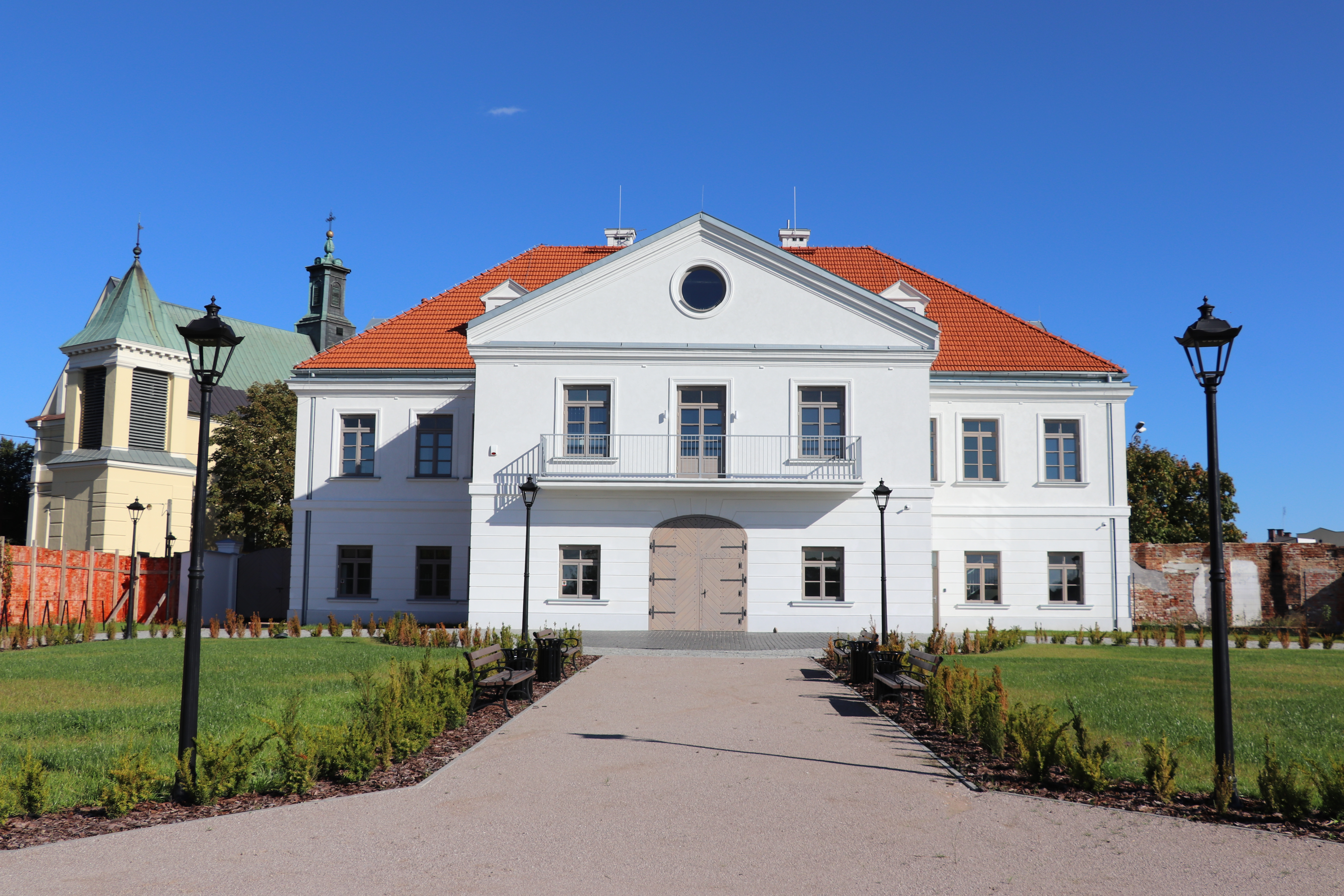
- An old inn from the 18th century

- Coat of arms

- Location within Poland
- Coordinates: 52°9′32″N 20°55′35″E
- Country: Poland
- Voivodeship: Masovian
- County: Pruszków
- Gmina: Raszyn

Population
  - Total: 6,700
- Time zone: UTC+1 (CET)
  - Summer (DST): UTC+2 (CEST)
- Postal code: 05-090
- Website: http://www.raszyn.pl

Raszyn ([ˈraʂɨn]) is a village in Pruszków County, Masovian Voivodeship, in east-central Poland. It is the seat of an administrative district called Gmina Raszyn. Raszyn is a part of the Warsaw metropolitan area.

== Geography ==
Raszyn itself currently functions as a suburb of Warsaw, with many villas and shops located there. The gmina has roughly 20,000 inhabitants and is one of the fastest-developing suburbs of the Polish capital.

== History ==
In the early modern period, a trade route from Warsaw reached Raszyn, where it split into two routes towards Kraków and Wrocław. It was one of the busiest routes in Poland. Raszyn was part of a larger noble estate centered in nearby Falenty. In 1603, the local church was visited by Bishop Wawrzyniec Goślicki. The wooden church was replaced by the present brick church in the 17th century by Zygmunt Opacki, Chamberlain of Warsaw and owner of the Falenty estate, and further expanded by his son, who was eventually buried in the church.

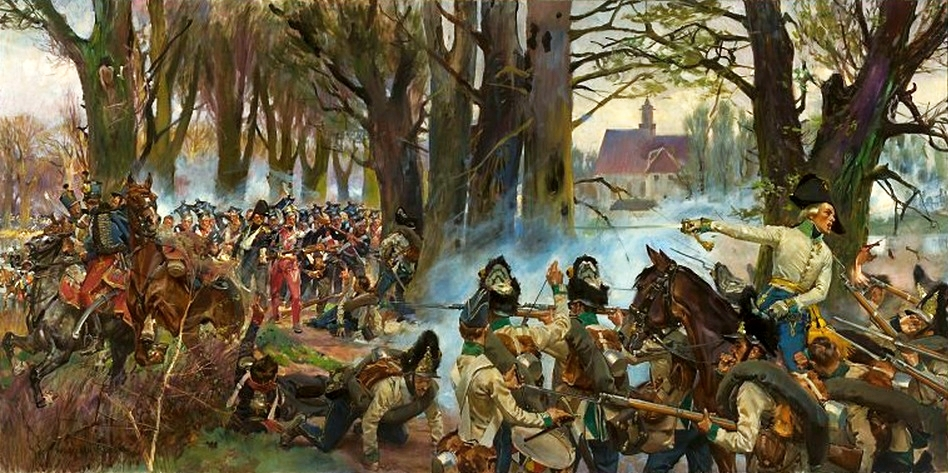
The Battle of Raszyn by Wojciech Kossak

Raszyn has been the site of two battles. On April 19, 1809, the inconclusive Battle of Raszyn (1809) took place between the Polish forces under Prince Józef Poniatowski and the Austrian army under Archduke Ferdinand d'Este. Polish poet Cyprian Godebski died in the battle.

In 1931 a longwave broadcasting transmitter was set up in Raszyn. Back then it was the strongest such facility in Europe, with roughly 120 kW of power.

Following the German-Soviet invasion of Poland, which started World War II in September 1939, the village was occupied by Germany until 1945. The local Polish police chief and another Polish policeman from Raszyn were murdered by the Russians in the Katyn massacre in 1940.

During the World War II the radio mast was destroyed, but was rebuilt in 1945 with roughly 500 kW of power. In 1949 a new aerial mast was built there. At 335 metres high, it was until 1962 the tallest structure in Europe. Until the inauguration of the transmitter in Konstantynów in 1974 it served as the central longwave radio facility of the Polish Radio. Until 1978 it served as spare transmitter for Konstantynów. Since 1978 the facility in Raszyn is used at daytime for transmissions of the second programme of the Polish Radio in the longwave range.

After the collapse of the Konstantynów radio mast in 1991, the transmitter in Raszyn yet again became the main broadcasting transmitter in Poland. After completion of the new longwave transmitter in Solec Kujawski in 1999, it was finally switched off in 2009.

== Sights ==
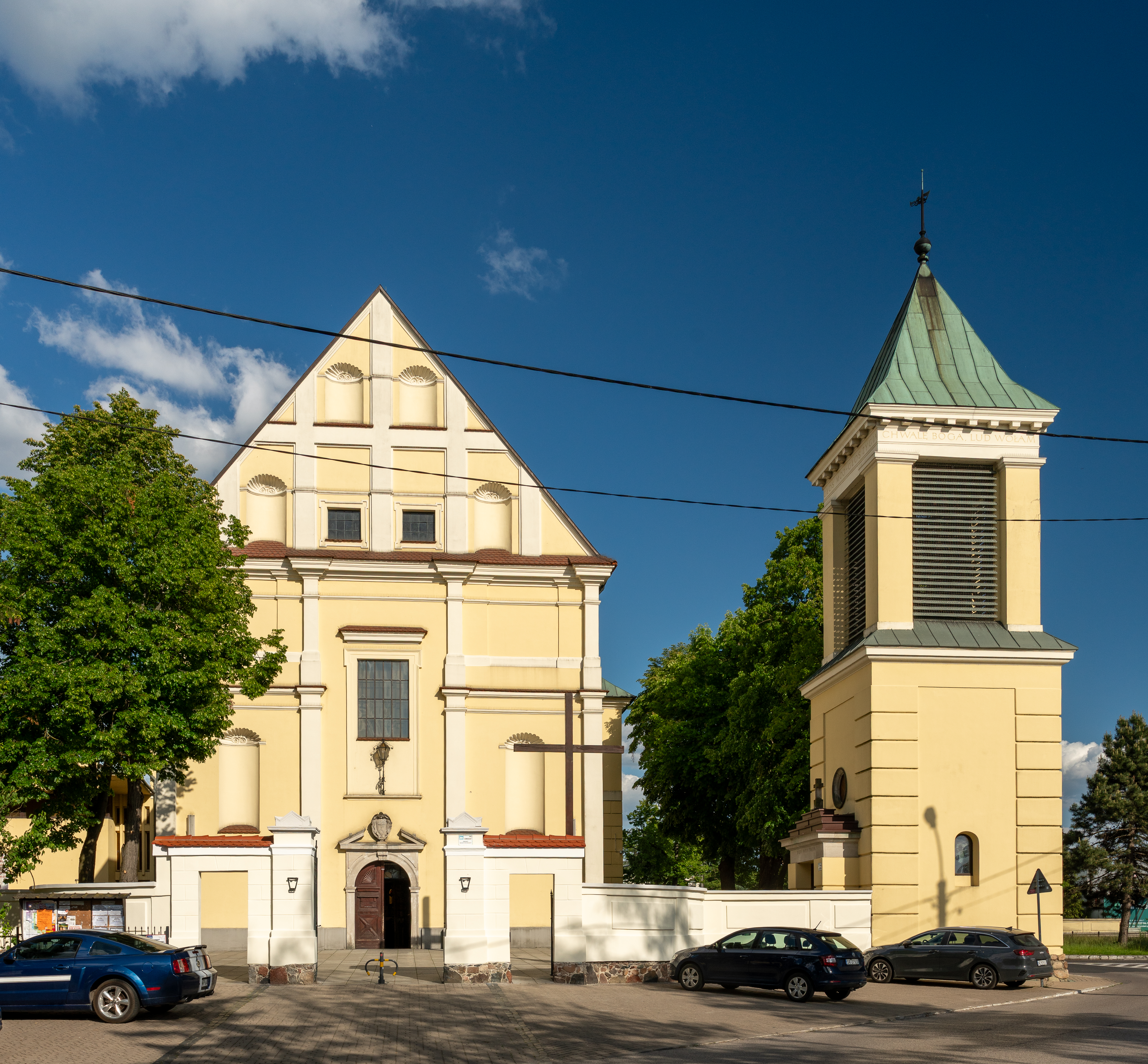
Saints Stephen and Anne church

- Saints Stephen and Anne church, Baroque-Neoclassical, built in the mid-17th century, and refurbished by renowned Polish architect Szymon Bogumił Zug in 1790, with furnishings from the 17th to 19th centuries.
- Old inn from the 18th century, built in Neoclassical style by architect Szymon Bogumił Zug.
- Raszyn Redoubt, artillery redoubt from the Battle of Raszyn (1809), now a site commemorating the battle, featuring a monument to the battle and a shrine at the spot where the poet Cyprian Godebski was killed.
- Stawy Raszyńskie reserve, established in 1978, for protection of large ponds and the natural habitat of roughly 100 species of birds. The protected area covers 1.1 km^{2} (0.42 sq mi).

== Notable residents ==
- Ewa Junczyk-Ziomecka (born 1949), Consul General of Poland in New York City
- Iga Świątek (born 2001), tennis player, multiple Grand Slam champion
