= Cyprian Godebski =

Cyprian Godebski may refer to:

- Cyprian Godebski (poet)
- Cyprian Godebski (sculptor)
