= Battle of Raszyn (1809) =

Battle of the Polish-Austrian War

- Part of the Polish–Austrian War, War of the Fifth Coalition
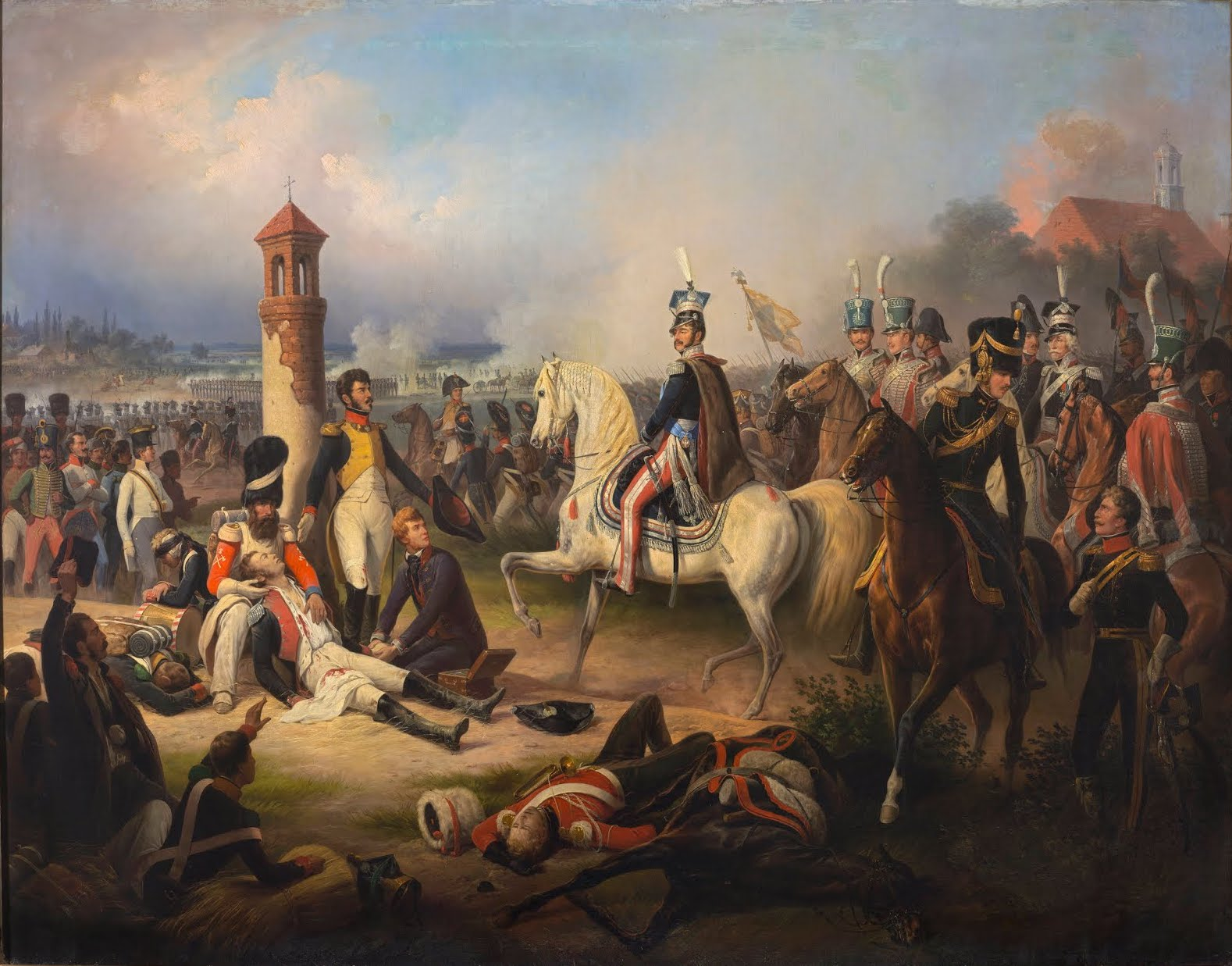
- The Death of Cyprian Godebski at Raszyn; January Suchodolski, 1855
Date	19 April 1809
Location	Raszyn, present-day Poland 52.158889°N 20.926389°E
Result	Austrian victory
Territorial changes	Austrians capture Warsaw

Belligerents
Austrian Empire	Duchy of Warsaw; Kingdom of Saxony

Commanders and leaders
(Austrian Empire) Archduke Ferdinand	Józef Poniatowski

Strength
26,000 to 29,790: 24,500 infantry, 4,500 cavalry, 94 guns	12,000 to 14,200: 10,500 infantry, 3,500 cavalry, 44 guns

Casualties and losses
400–600 Polish estimate: 2,500 killed and wounded	1,400 (1,100 Poles, 300 Saxons): • 450 killed; • 800–900 wounded; • 50 captured

War of the Fifth Coalition:
Polish–Austrian War
The color black indicates the current battle.

The Battle of Raszyn was fought on 19 April 1809 between armies of the Austrian Empire under Archduke Ferdinand Karl Joseph of Austria-Este and the Duchy of Warsaw under Józef Antoni Poniatowski, as part of the War of the Fifth Coalition in the Napoleonic Wars. The battle was not decisive, but it did result in the Austrians obtaining their goal by capturing the Polish capital Warsaw.

== Battle ==
The battlefield's terrain is dominated by several villages and by the river Utrata, which during the April thaw is usually unfordable. The only way to cross the river is at the ponds of Raszyn, Dawidy or Michalowice, which were all under Polish control.

After a preparatory cannonade starting at 14:00, the Austrian infantry attacked the Polish screening forces around 15:00. The Poles gradually yielded terrain. Austrian attempts to outflank the Polish position near Jaworowo were unsuccessful. After the village of Falenty was captured at 16:00 Poniatowski launched a counterattack which evicted the Austrians from the town and re-established the Polish line. Around 17:00 a combined attack was launched against Raszyn. Repulsed by the Saxon units, the Austrians called up reinforcements and took the town around 19:00 but were unable to progress beyond the last houses of the village. The Poles again counterattacked at 21:00 and drove the Austrians from Raszyn but were unable to recapture the causeway. Fighting progressed until 22:00 when the Poles evacuated the battlefield.

== Aftermath ==
As a result, the Austrians captured Warsaw, and the first days after that Polish society perceived it as a new partition (see Partitions of Poland). This, combined with the fact that the Poles evacuated the battlefield, allowed some sources to claim that the Austrians had won the battle. Polish historiography does not agree with this statement, which claims that the strategic objectives of the Austrians were not fulfilled, which ultimately led to negative actions throughout the war.

In the following weeks Greater Poland was defended by the Corps of General Henryk Dąbrowski and the Polish cavalry seized Lwów. Finally, Poniatowski left only a small force near Warsaw to prevent the Austrians from leaving it and moved the rest of his forces southwards, which led to capturing the city of Kraków.

On 14 October 1809 the Treaty of Schönbrunn was signed between Austria and France. According to it, Austria lost approximately 50,000 square kilometres of land inhabited by over 1,900,000 people. The territories annexed by the Duchy of Warsaw included the lands of Zamość and Kraków as well as 50% of income of the Wieliczka salt mines.

In the opinion of the Polish military historian, General Marian Kukiel, the Battle of Raszyn can be characterized as follows:

“The Battle of Raszyn on the Polish side is an example of pure defense; Poniatowski left the initiative to the enemy until the end, which is understandable considering the terrible ratio of forces and the size of the front. On the Austrian side, an energetic frontal attack on two tactical keys, Falenty and Raszyn, was combined in both cases with a maneuver on the flank of the appropriate group of our troops. However, there was no large-scale maneuver, although the advantage in numbers made it easier for the Austrians to bypass and surround our position. This is explained only by disregard of the enemy, who was considered before the battle as a kind of unruly and untrained militia.”

Afterwards, Poniatowski was presented with the grand-aigle de la Légion d'honneur, a saber of honor, and a lancer's shako.

The Battle of Raszyn is commemorated on the Tomb of the Unknown Soldier, Warsaw, with the inscription "RASZYN 19 IV 1809".

== Gallery ==
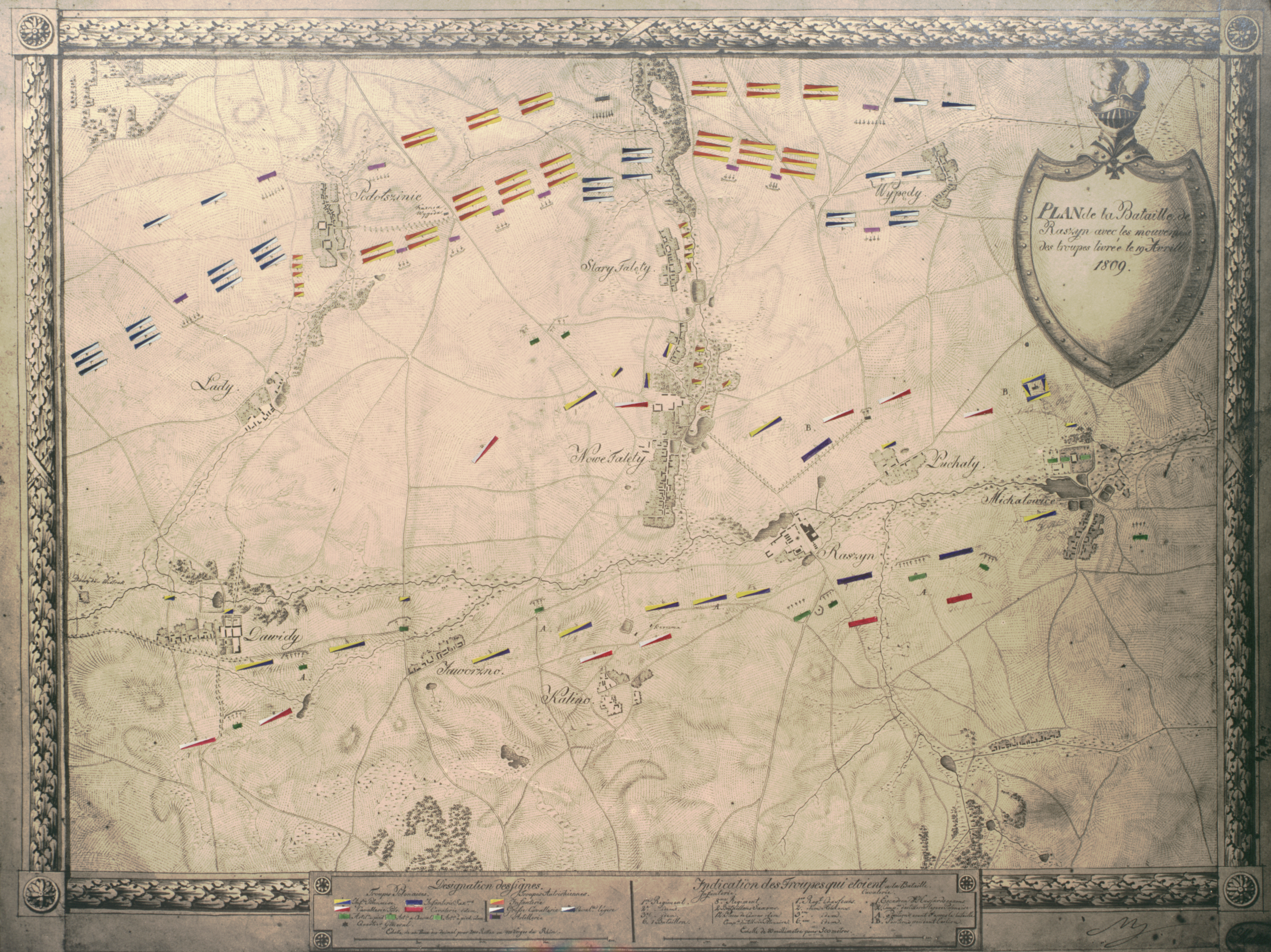
Battle plan (in French)

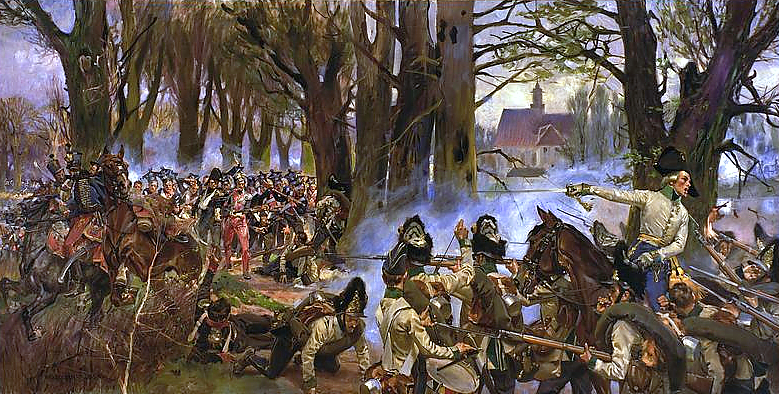
Another depiction of the battle (by Wojciech Kossak): Austrians engage Poles

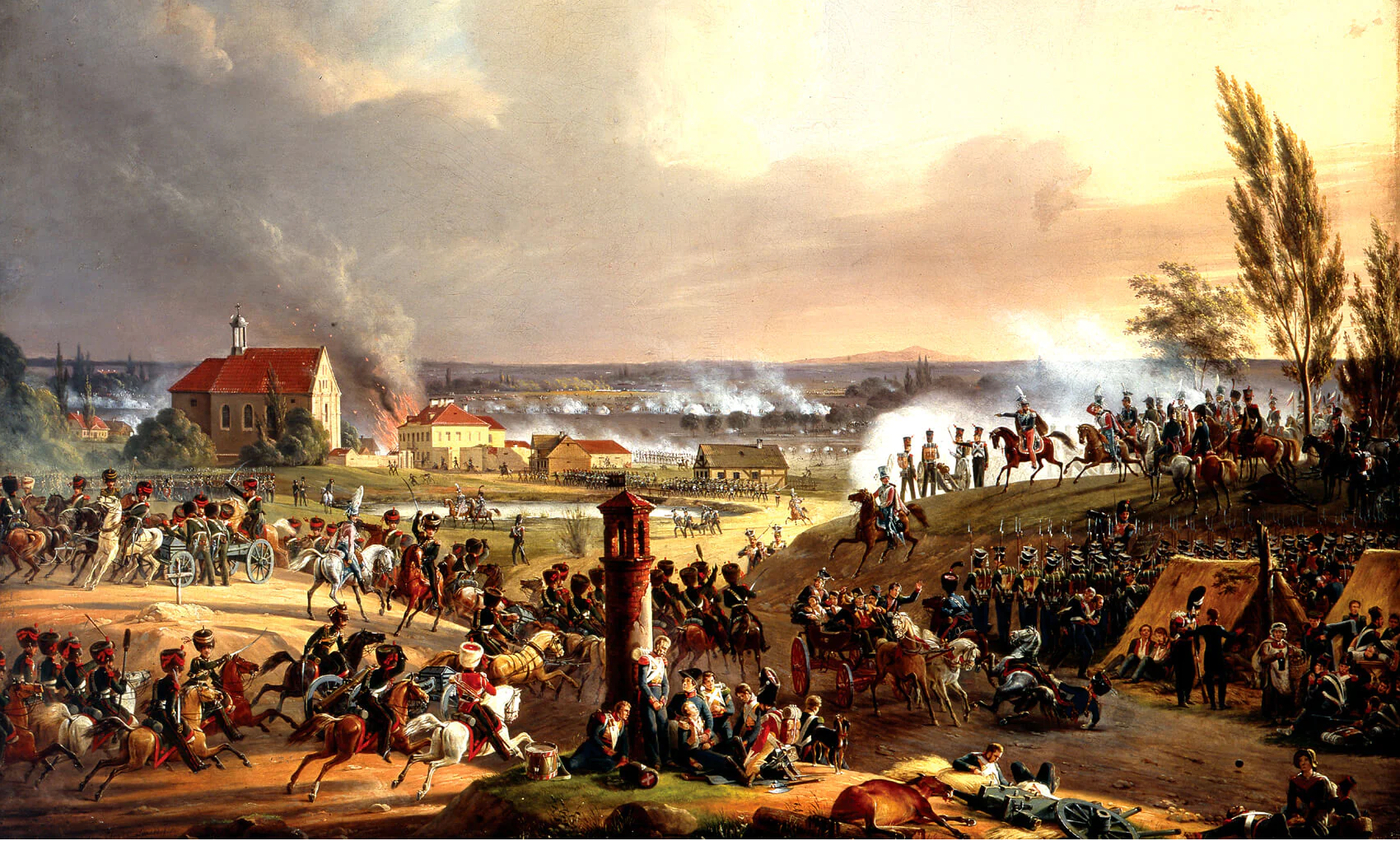
The battle by J. Suchodolski

== See also ==
- Cyprian Godebski

== Notes ==
Preceded by Battle of Teugen-Hausen	Napoleonic Wars; Battle of Raszyn (1809)	Succeeded by Battle of Abensberg
