= The Death of Prince Poniatowski =

Painting by Horace Vernet

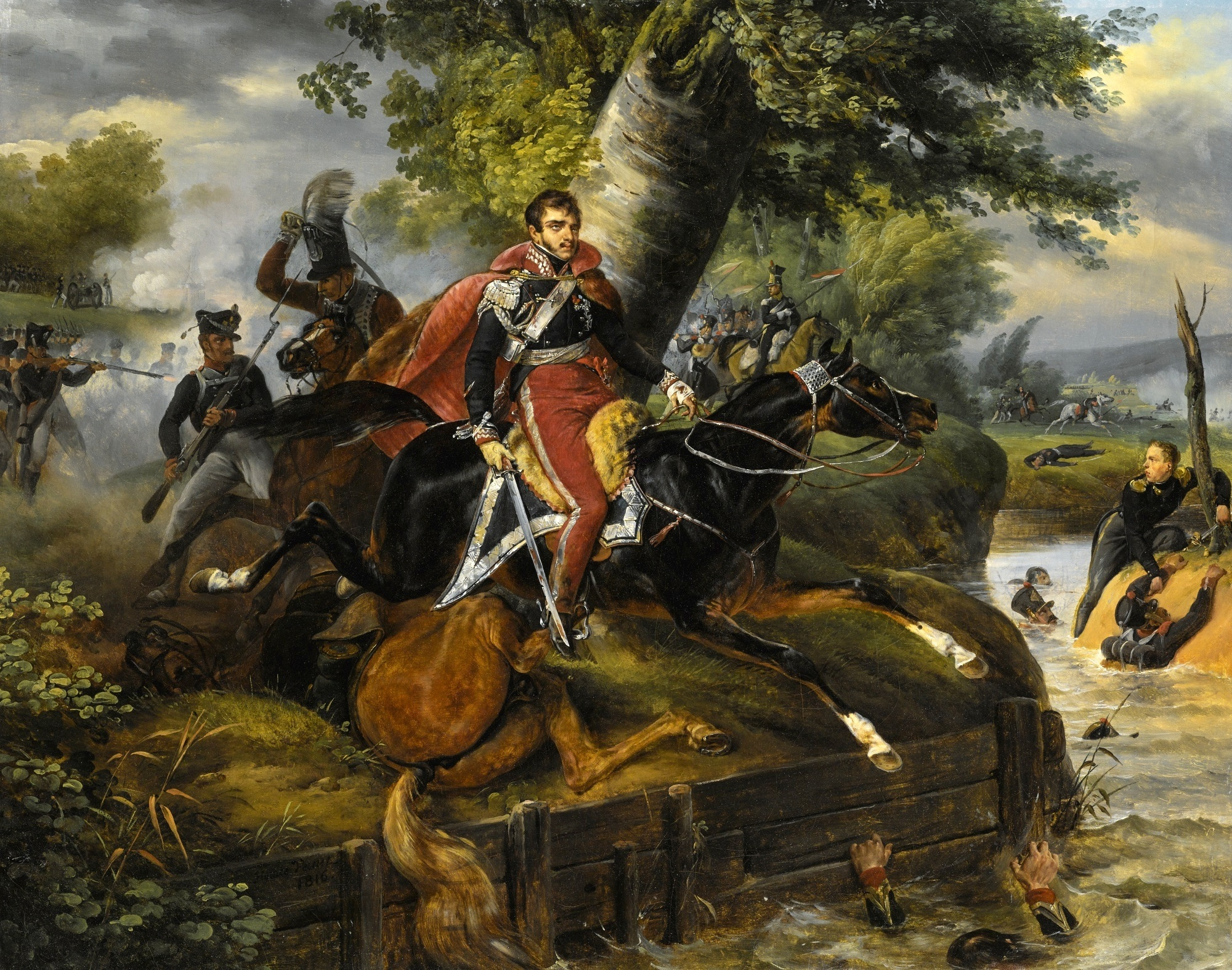
- Artist: Horace Vernet
- Year: 1816
- Type: Oil on canvas, history painting
- Dimensions: 65.5 cm × 82 cm (25.8 in × 32 in)
- Location: Private collection

The Death of Prince Poniatowski (French: La Mort du prince Józef Poniatowski) is an 1816 history painting by the French artist Horace Vernet. It depicts the death of the Polish general Józef Poniatowski at the Battle of Leipzig in October 1813.

== History ==
Recently promoted to the rank of Marshal of the Empire by Napoleon, Poniatowski was ordered to defend the city of Leipzig during the battle. He drowned in the River Elster after covering the chaotic attempt to break out following Napoleon's defeat.

Poniatowski was a nephew of the last king of Poland Stanisław August Poniatowski. He fought with the Grande Armée Following the defeat of Prussia in 1806-07 he was appointed Minister of War and commander-in-chief of the newly-formed Grand Duchy of Warsaw. Under Napoleon's general leadership he took part in the War of the Fifth Coalition in 1809 and the Invasion of Russia. His death at Leipzig gave birth to the Napoleonic legend in Poland, which didn't regain its independence until the end of the First World War. The painting was exhibited at the Salon of 1817.

== Bibliography ==
- Harkett, Daniel & Hornstein, Katie (ed.) Horace Vernet and the Thresholds of Nineteenth-Century Visual Culture. Dartmouth College Press, 2017.
- Królewski, Zamek. Semper Polonia: l'art en Pologne des lumières au romantisme (1764-1849).. Somogy, 2004.
- Jędrysiak, Jacek. Prussian Strategic Thought 1815–1830: Beyond Clausewitz. BRILL, 12 Oct 2020
- Ruutz-Rees, Janet Emily. Horace Vernet. Scribner and Welford, 1880.
- Wandycz, Piotr S. The Lands of Partitioned Poland, 1795-1918. University of Washington Press, 1975.
