= Austro-Polish War =

1809 war during the War of the Fifth Coalition

- Part of the War of the Fifth Coalition
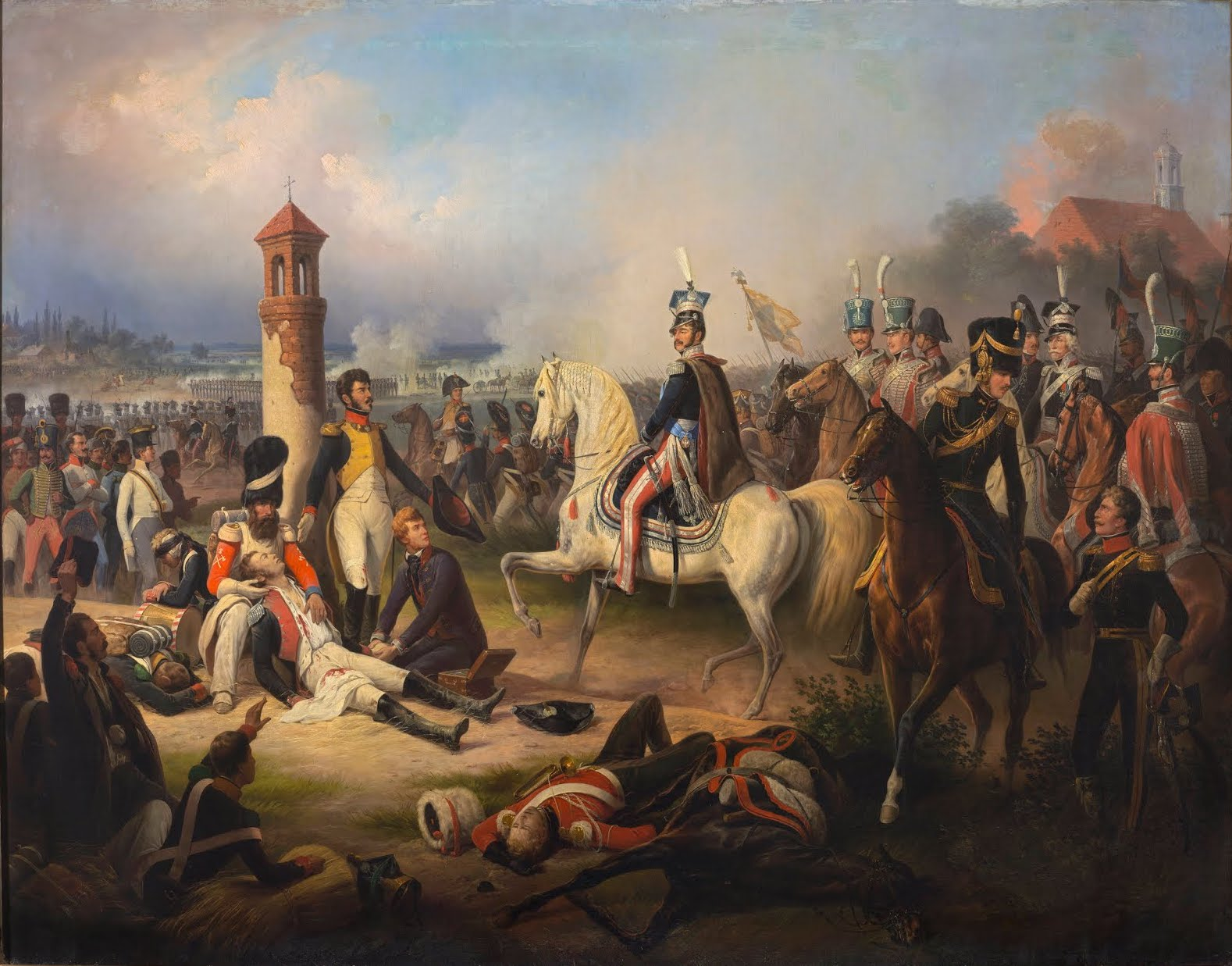
- The Death of Cyprian Godebski at Raszyn by January Suchodolski, 1855. Polish forces stop Austrian advance at Raszyn
Date	10 April 1809 – 14 October 1809
Location	Duchy of Warsaw, Kingdom of Galicia and Lodomeria
Result	Polish victory
Territorial changes	Austria cedes Lublin, Kraków, Siedlce and Zamość district to the Duchy of Warsaw and Tarnopol to the Russian Empire

Belligerents
Duchy of Warsaw; Kingdom of Saxony	Austrian Empire

Commanders and leaders
(Duchy of Warsaw) Józef Poniatowski (Duchy of Warsaw) Stanisław Kostka (Duchy of Warsaw) Michał Sokolnicki (Duchy of Warsaw) Jan Dąbrowski (Duchy of Warsaw) Berek Joselewicz † (Duchy of Warsaw) Michal Kamienski	(Austrian Empire) Archduke Ferdinand (Austrian Empire) Christian Wurmser (Austrian Empire) Johan von Mohr (Austrian Empire) Friedrich Hoditz

Strength
14,200–16,000 (initially)	38,000 (initially)

War of the Fifth Coalition:
Polish–Austrian War

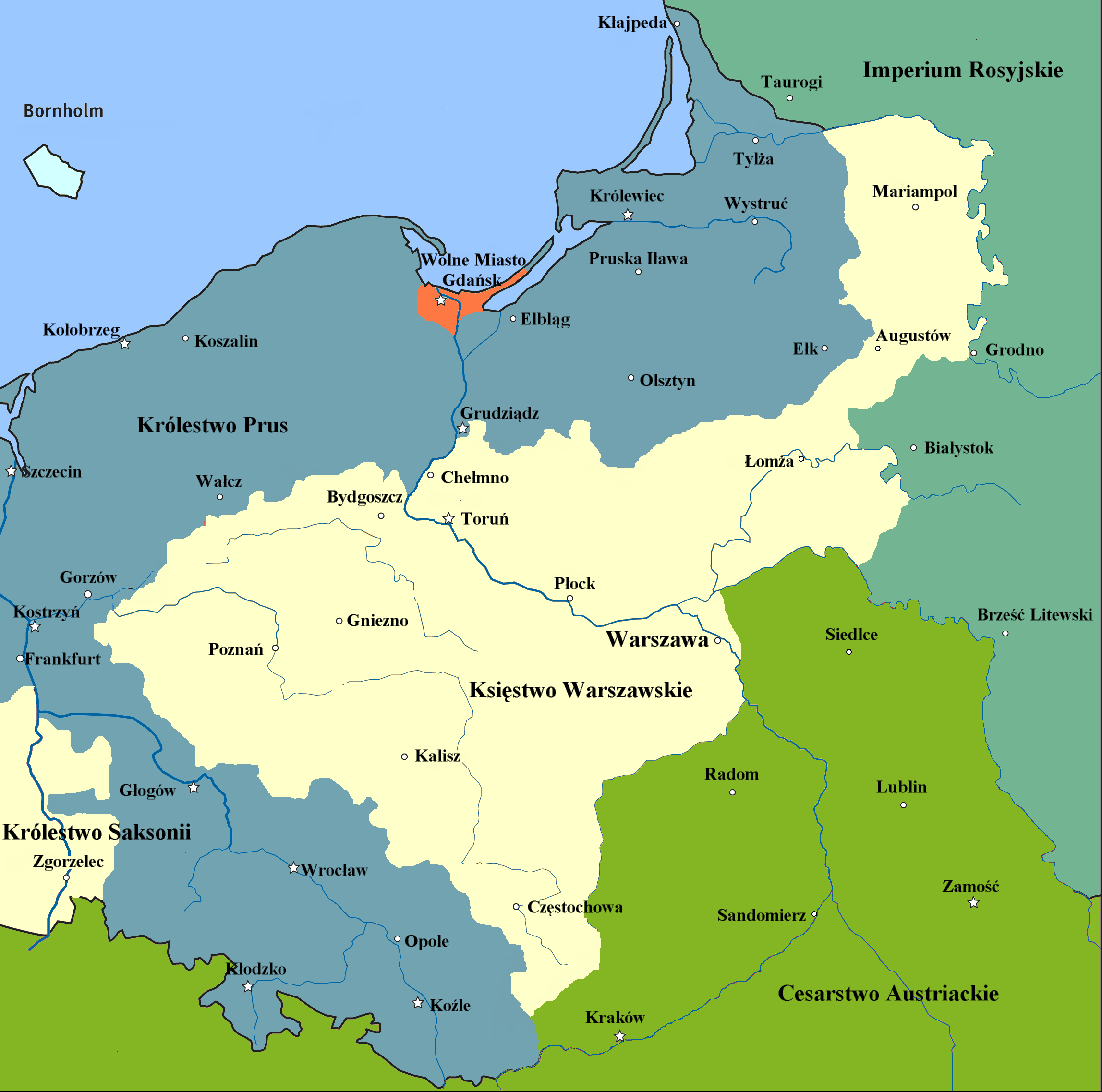
Duchy of Warsaw 1807–1809

The Austro-Polish War or Polish-Austrian War was a part of the War of the Fifth Coalition in 1809 (a coalition of the Austrian Empire and the United Kingdom against Napoleon's French Empire and allied states). In this war, Polish forces of the Napoleon-allied Duchy of Warsaw and assisted by forces of the Kingdom of Saxony, fought against the Austrian Empire. In June, the Russian Empire joined against Austria. Polish troops withstood the Austrian attack on Warsaw defeating them at Raszyn, then abandoned Warsaw in order to reconquer parts of pre-partition Poland including Kraków and Lwów, forcing the Austrians to abandon Warsaw in futile pursuit.

== The war ==
The Army of the Duchy of Warsaw was weakened as the French corps garrisoning it were sent to Spain in 1808, and only the duchy's own Polish forces remained in it. With the start of the War of the Fifth Coalition, an Austrian corps under Archduke Ferdinand Karl Joseph of Austria-Este invaded the territory of the Duchy of Warsaw on 14 April 1809, engaging the Polish defenders soldiers under Prince Józef Poniatowski).

After the Battle of Raszyn on 19 April, where Poniatowski's Polish troops brought an Austrian force twice their number to a standstill (but neither side defeated the other decisively), the Polish forces nonetheless retreated, allowing the Austrians to occupy the duchy's capital, Warsaw, as Poniatowski decided that the city would be hard to defend, and instead decided to keep his army mobile in the field and engage the Austrians elsewhere, crossing to the eastern (right) bank of the Vistula. Indeed, the duchy's capital was seized by the Austrian army with little opposition, but it was a Pyrrhic victory for them, since the Austrian commander diverted most of his forces there at the expense of other fronts. Ferdinand garrisoned Warsaw with 10,000 soldiers, and split his remaining forces, sending 6,000 corps to the right bank of the Vistula, and the rest towards Toruń and other targets on the left bank.

In a series of battles (at Radzymin, Grochów and Ostrówek), the Polish forces defeated elements of the Austrian army, forcing the Austrians to retreat to the western side of the river. First a major attack on bridges in Warsaw's suburb of Praga by a 6,000-strong Austrian force which had crossed the river earlier was stopped by 1,000 Polish fortified defenders. Soon afterwards the Austrian forces besieging Praga were defeated by General Michał Sokolnicki, first at the Battle of Grochów (on 26 April), later, when the Austrian army tried to pursue Sokolnicki's Poles, it was routed on 2 and 3 May at the Battle of Góra Kalwaria (in which battle the Poles also destroyed the Austrians' partially built bridge together with their engineering equipment). This left the initiative on the right bank firmly with the Poles.

In the following weeks Greater Poland was defended by the Corps of General Henryk Dąbrowski, while Poniatowski left only a small screening force guarding bridges on the Vistula and moved the rest of his forces southwards. Ferdinand made a few more attempts, trying to establish a bridgehead on the other side of the Vistula, but these were defeated. Polish forces successfully prevented the Austrians from crossing the river, and, staying close to the Vistula to control the situation, invaded the weakly defended Austrian territory to the south, on Austrian forces rear, taking parts of the recently partitioned Polish territories. Polish forces took the major cities of Lublin (14 May), Sandomierz (18 May), Zamość (20 May), and Lwów (27 May). A Polish administration and military formations were quickly organized on the taken territories, while generals Jan Henryk Dąbrowski and Józef Zajączek commanded the units slowing down the Austrians on the western bank of the Vistula.

Eventually the Austrian main army under Archduke Ferdinand, unable to push further on the left bank, and in danger of having its supply lines cut by Poniatowski, was forced to abandon the siege of Toruń, abandon Warsaw itself (on 1 June) and move south, planning to engage the Polish army to the south in Galicia and at some point merge with the main Austrian army operating further to the west. Poniatowski decided not to engage the Austrian forces, concentrating instead on taking as much of Galicia as possible.

On 3 June, Russian forces also crossed the Austrian border to Galicia, trying to prevent the Poles from gaining too much strength and hoping to take some Austrian-held territories with no intent of returning them after the war. The Russian forces were, in theory, honouring a stipulation in the Treaty of Tilsit which called for Russia to join France in the event of an Austrian breach of the peace, but Russian and Austrian forces still considered each other de facto allies. The commander in the theatre, Sergei Golitsyn, had instructions to aid the Polish as little as possible.

The Austrians managed to defeat Zajączek at the Battle of Jedlińsk on 11 June and took back Sandomierz (on 18 June) and Lwów, but were unable to engage Poniatowski, who in the meantime had taken Kielce and Kraków (15 July). Zajączek's corps would join up with Poniatowski's on 19 June, and with Dąbrowski's and Sokolnicki's on 3 and 4 July. The Austrians were finally intercepted and defeated by the French at the Battle of Wagram (5 July – 6 July).

== Austrian Order of Battle ==
On 5 July 1809, the Austrian forces operating in Poland numbered 18,700 infantry, 2,400 cavalry, and 66 artillery pieces. The total of 23,200 troops were organized into 26 infantry battalions and 28 squadrons in 4 cavalry regiments. The order of battle is listed below.

VII Armeekorps: Feldmarschall-Leutnant Archduke Ferdinand Karl Joseph of Austria-Este

- Artillery Reserve: Commander unknown
  - Two 12-pdr position batteries (12 guns)
  - 6-pdr position battery (6 guns)
  - 3-pdr cavalry battery (6 guns)
- Division: Feldmarschall-Leutnant Johann Friedrich von Mohr
  - Divisional Artillery: 3-pdr cavalry battery (6 guns)
  - Brigade: General-Major Kelgrer
    - 1st Wallachian Grenz Infantry Regiment # 16 (2 battalions)
    - Vukassovich Infantry Regiment # 48 (3 battalions)
  - Brigade: Commander unknown
    - 2nd Wallachian Grenz Infantry Regiment # 17 (2 battalions)
    - Szekler Grenz Hussar Regiment # 11 (8 squadrons)
  - Brigade: Commander unknown
    - 1st Szekler Grenz Infantry Regiment # 14 (2 battalions)
    - 2nd Szekler Grenz Infantry Regiment # 15 (2 battalions)
    - 3-pdr brigade battery (8 guns)
- Division: Feldmarschall-Leutnant Ludwig von Mondet
  - Divisional Artillery: 6-pdr position battery (6 guns)
  - Brigade: General-Major Karl Leopold Civalart d'Happoncourt
    - Davidovich Infantry Regiment # 34 (3 battalions)
    - Weidenfeld Infantry Regiment # 37 (3 battalions)
    - 6-pdr brigade battery (8 guns)
  - Brigade: General-Major Franz von Pflacher
    - De Ligne Infantry Regiment # 30 (3 battalions)
    - Strauch Infantry Regiment # 24 (3 battalions)
    - Kottulinsky Infantry Regiment # 41 (3 battalions)
    - 6-pdr brigade battery (8 guns)
- Division: Feldmarschall-Leutnant Karl August von Schauroth
  - Divisional Artillery: 6-pdr cavalry battery (6 guns)
  - Brigade: Commander unknown
    - Palatinal Hussar Regiment # 12 (8 squadrons)
  - Brigade: Commander unknown
    - Somariva Cuirassier Regiment # 5 (6 squadrons)
    - Lothringen Cuirassier Regiment # 7 (6 squadrons)

== Aftermath ==
General Józef Poniatowski became a national hero in Poland following this campaign. He also received a ceremonial saber from Napoleon for his victories.

In the aftermath of the Treaty of Schönbrunn, some of the territory liberated by Polish forces was returned to Austria, however West Galicia was incorporated into the Duchy of Warsaw.
