= Józef Poniatowski =

Polish military officer (1763–1813)

Marshal of the Empire Prince Józef Poniatowski
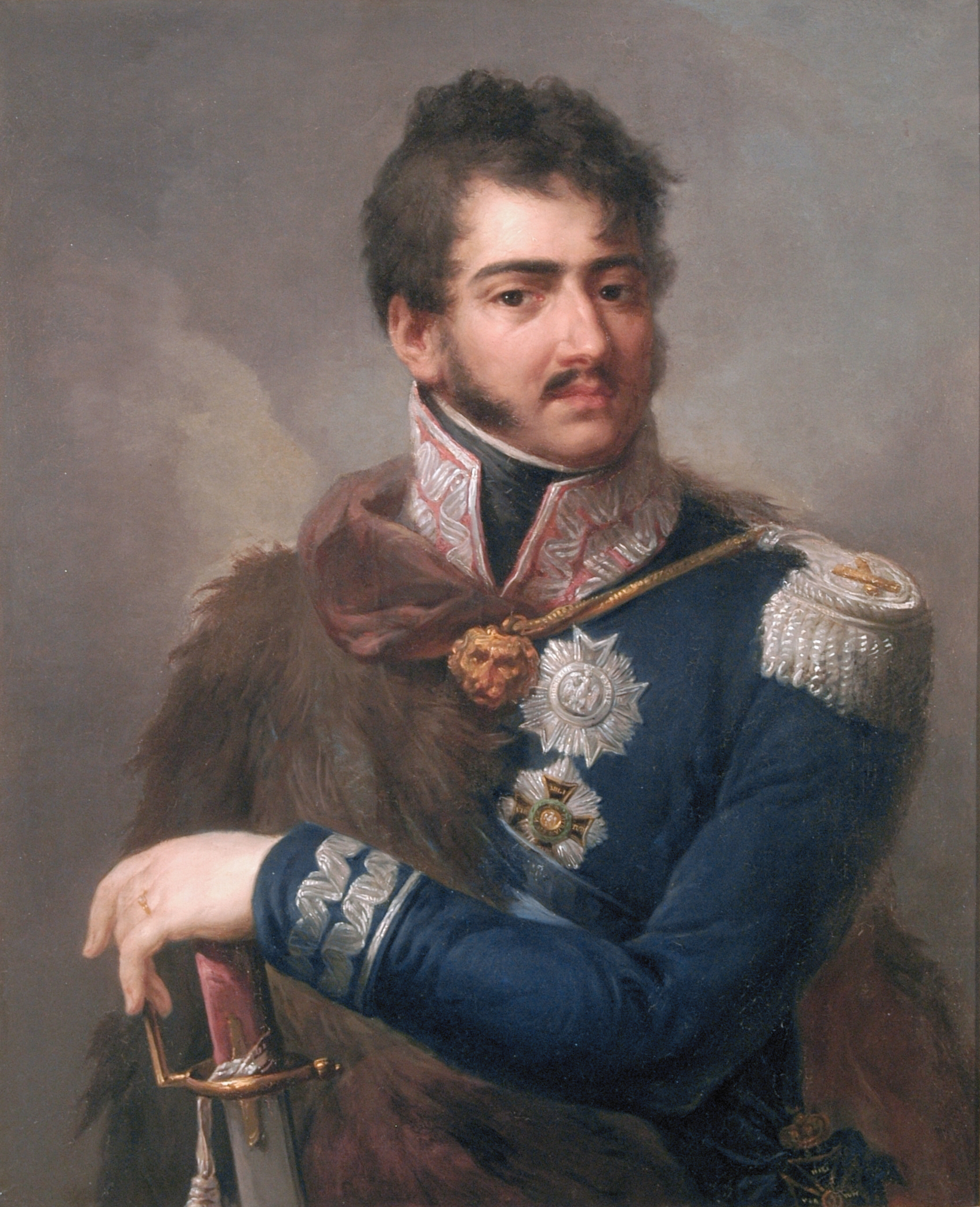
- Portrait of Poniatowski by Josef Grassi, c. 1810
- Born: Józef Antoni Poniatowski; 7 May 1763; Palais Kinsky, Vienna, Habsburg Monarchy
- Died: 19 October 1813 (aged 50); White Elster River, Kingdom of Saxony
- Military career
- Allegiance: Habsburg Monarchy; Polish-Lithuanian Commonwealth; First French Empire; Duchy of Warsaw
- Service years: 1780–1813
- Rank: Marshal of the Empire
- Nickname: The Polish Bayard
- Conflicts: Austro-Turkish War (1787–1791); Siege of Šabac; Polish–Russian War of 1792; Battle of Zieleńce; Battle of Dubienka; Kościuszko Uprising; Siege of Warsaw (1794); Battle of Maciejowice; Napoleonic Wars; War of the Fifth Coalition; Austro-Polish War; Battle of Raszyn; French invasion of Russia; Battle of Smolensk; Battle of Borodino; Battle of Tarutino; Battle of Vyazma; Battle of Berezina; War of the Sixth Coalition; German campaign of 1813; Battle of Leipzig †
- Awards: Order of Saint Stanislaus Order of Black Eagle's Order of the Red Eagle Order of White Eagle Grand Cross Star of Virtuti Militari Order Grand Cross of Legion of Honour

3rd Prime Minister of the Duchy of Warsaw
- Acting
- In office November 1808 – 25 March 1809
- Monarch: Frederick Augustus I
- Preceded by: Ludwik Szymon Gutakowski
- Succeeded by: Stanisław Kostka Potocki

Minister of War of the Duchy of Warsaw
- In office 5 October 1807 – 4 May 1813
- Monarch: Frederick Augustus I
- Prime Minister: Stanisław Małachowski; Ludwik Szymon Gutakowski; Himself (as acting); Stanisław Kostka Potocki

Commander-in-Chief of the Army of the Duchy of Warsaw
- In office 5 October 1807 – 4 May 1813
- Monarch: Frederick Augustus I
- Prime Minister: Stanisław Małachowski; Ludwik Szymon Gutakowski; Himself (as acting); Stanisław Kostka Potocki
- Minister of War: Himself

Prince Józef Antoni Poniatowski (Polish pronunciation: [ˈjuzɛf anˈtɔɲi pɔɲaˈtɔfskʲi]; 7 May 1763 – 19 October 1813) was a Polish military officer and politician who served in the French Revolutionary and Napoleonic Wars.

A nephew of King Stanislaus Augustus, Poniatowski began his military career in 1780 in the Imperial Army of the Holy Roman Emperor, where he attained the rank of colonel. In 1789, after leaving the Imperial Army, he joined the Polish–Lithuanian Commonwealth Army at the request of his uncle. Poniatowski, now at the rank of major general and commander of the Royal Guards, took part in the Polish–Russian War of 1792, leading the Polish army to victory at the Battle of Zieleńce. After the king's support for the Targowica Confederation of 1792, Poniatowski felt compelled to resign. In 1794 he participated in the Kościuszko Uprising against Russia and oversaw the unsuccessful defence of Warsaw, for which Russian authorities exiled him from Poland until 1798.

In 1807, after the First French Empire established the client Duchy of Warsaw, Poniatowski was appointed the duchy's minister of war. He commanded a 16,000-strong army during the Austro-Polish War in 1809 and fought a larger Austrian force in the Battle of Raszyn. There followed a Polish advance into the territory of Galicia. The conflict ended with a Polish victory, which allowed the Duchy of Warsaw to recover some of the lands lost in the Partitions of Poland.

A staunch ally and supporter of Napoleon, Poniatowski voluntarily took part in the French invasion of Russia in 1812. Injuries received during the invasion eventually forced his return to Warsaw, where he worked on the reconstruction of the army of the Duchy of Warsaw, which was intended to fight in the German campaign of 1813. During the Battle of Leipzig, Poniatowski was badly wounded while trying to escape and drowned in the White Elster.

== Early life ==
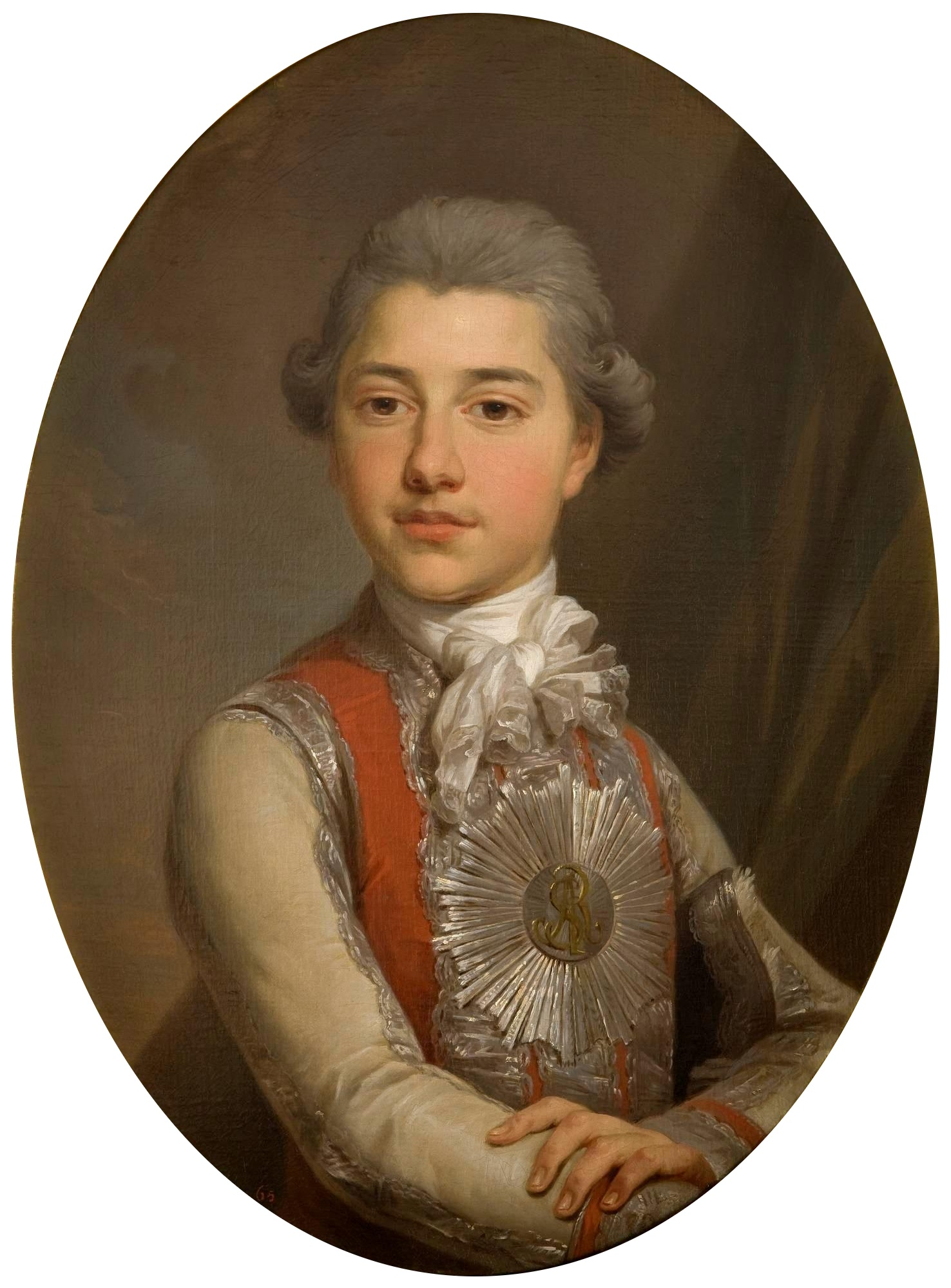
Portrait of Poniatowski from 1778, by Marcello Bacciarelli

Prince Józef Antoni Poniatowski was born in Vienna, Austria, at the Palais Kinsky. He was baptized in Vienna's Schottenkirche.

He was the son of Andrzej Poniatowski, the brother of the last king of Poland and grand duke of Lithuania Stanislaus II Augustus (born Stanisław Poniatowski), and a field marshal in the service of Austria. His mother was Countess Maria Theresia Kinsky von Wchinitz und Tettau (1740-1806), a court lady and a friend of Maria Theresa belonging to an old and influential Austro-Bohemian aristocratic family. His father died when Józef was ten, Stanislaus Augustus then became his guardian and the two enjoyed a close personal relationship that lasted for the rest of their lives.

Maria Theresa was the godmother of Józef's older sister, who was also named Maria Teresa, after the Empress. Józef was born and raised in Vienna, but also spent time with his mother in Prague and later with his uncle the king in Warsaw. Brought up in the "ancient regime" society, he was tutored in French, and spoke to his mother in that language. He also learned Polish, German and later, Russian. As a child he acquired the nickname "Prince Pepi", the Czech diminutive form of Joseph.

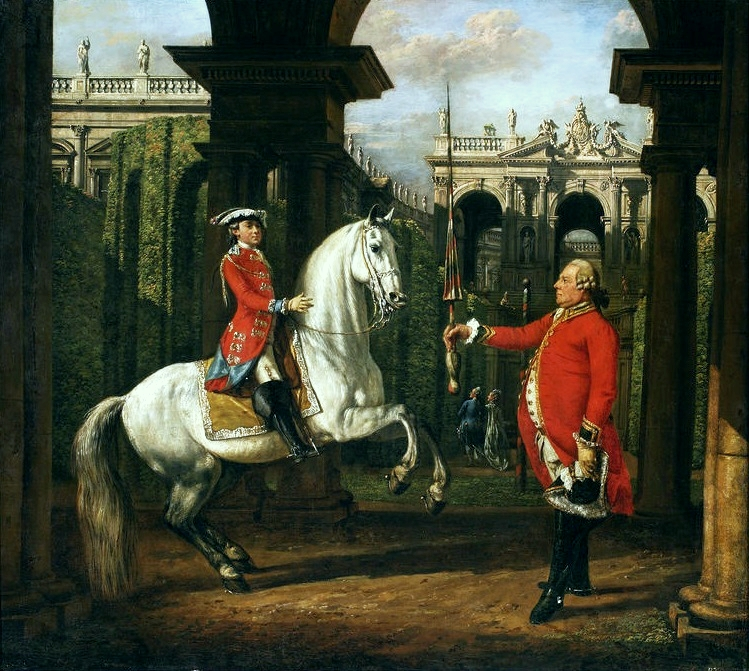
Colonel Königsfels Teaching Prince Poniatowski to Ride by Bernardo Bellotto, 1773

He was trained for a military career, but also learned how to play keyboard instruments and had a portable one which he carried with him later even during military campaigns. Because of Stanislaus' influence, Poniatowski chose to consider himself a Polish citizen and transferred to the Polish army at the age of 26. In Vienna, he represented the king at the funeral of Maria Theresa. In 1787 he travelled with Stanislaus Augustus to Kaniov and Kiev, to meet with Catherine the Great. Laure Junot, Duchess of Abrantès, wife of Jean-Andoche Junot, described Poniatowski in his mid-twenties as having been:

handsome, brave, enterprising, and determined, as he himself once assured me, to undertake everything for the liberation of unhappy Poland.

=== Austro-Turkish War ===
Having chosen a military career, Poniatowski joined the Austrian imperial army, where he was commissioned lieutenant in 1780, in 1786/1788 promoted to colonel, and, when Austria declared war against the Ottoman Empire in 1788, he became an aide-de-camp to Emperor Joseph II. Poniatowski fought in that war and distinguished himself at the storming of Šabac on 25 April 1788, where he was seriously wounded. At Šabac he also reportedly saved the life of a younger colleague, Prince Karl Philipp Schwarzenberg. Later their military paths crossed repeatedly, as friends and foes, and at the end of Poniatowski's career Schwarzenberg delivered the crushing blow at the Battle of Leipzig in which Poniatowski was killed.

== Polish military service and defence of the 3 May Constitution ==
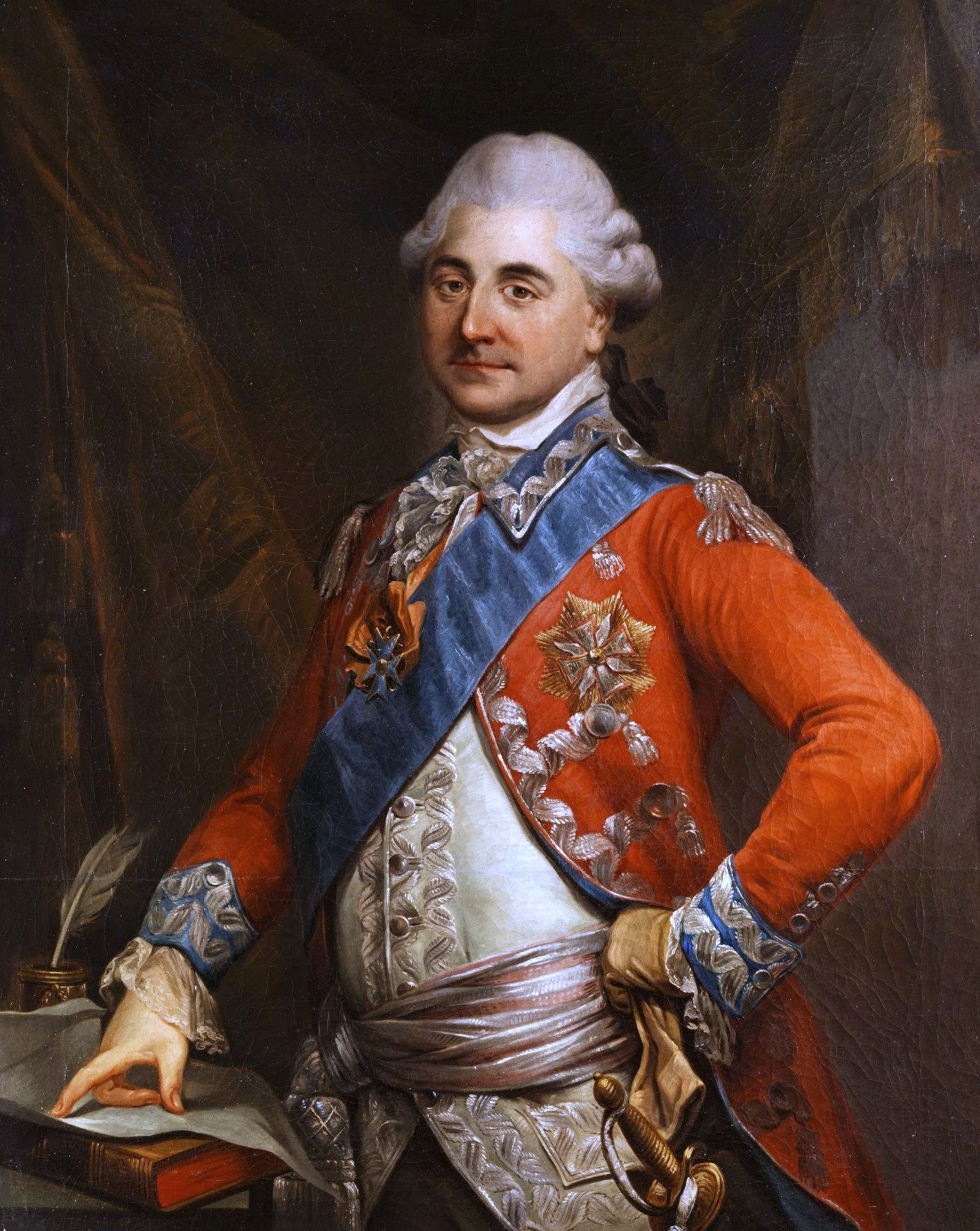
Stanislaus Augustus of Poland encouraged his nephew to return and serve in the Polish ranks.

Summoned by his uncle, Stanislaus II Augustus, and the Sejm when the Polish Army was reorganized, Poniatowski returned to Poland. The King had made previous arrangements with the Austrian authorities for this transfer, which in the end depended on his nephew's willingness to make the move. In October 1789, together with Tadeusz Kościuszko and three others, Poniatowski received the rank of major-general, and was appointed commander of a division in Ukraine and devoted himself to rebuilding the small, and long-time neglected, Polish–Lithuanian Commonwealth's army.

This took place during the period of deliberations by the Four-Year Sejm, which ended with the proclamation of the 3 May Constitution in 1791. Poniatowski was an enthusiastic supporter of the reforms and a member of the Friends of the Constitution Association. The passage of the document was assured partially by the military forces under the Prince's command, which surrounded the Royal Castle during the final proceedings. He himself stood in the room with a group of soldiers.

On 6 May 1792 Poniatowski was appointed Lieutenant-General and commander of the Polish army in Ukraine, with the task of defending the country against the imminent Russian attack. There Prince Józef was aided by Kościuszko and Michał Wielhorski, a friend from the Austrian service. In the fighting, badly outnumbered and outgunned by the enemy, obliged constantly to retreat, but disputing every point of vantage, he turned on the pursuer whenever the Russian pressed too closely, and won several notable victories.

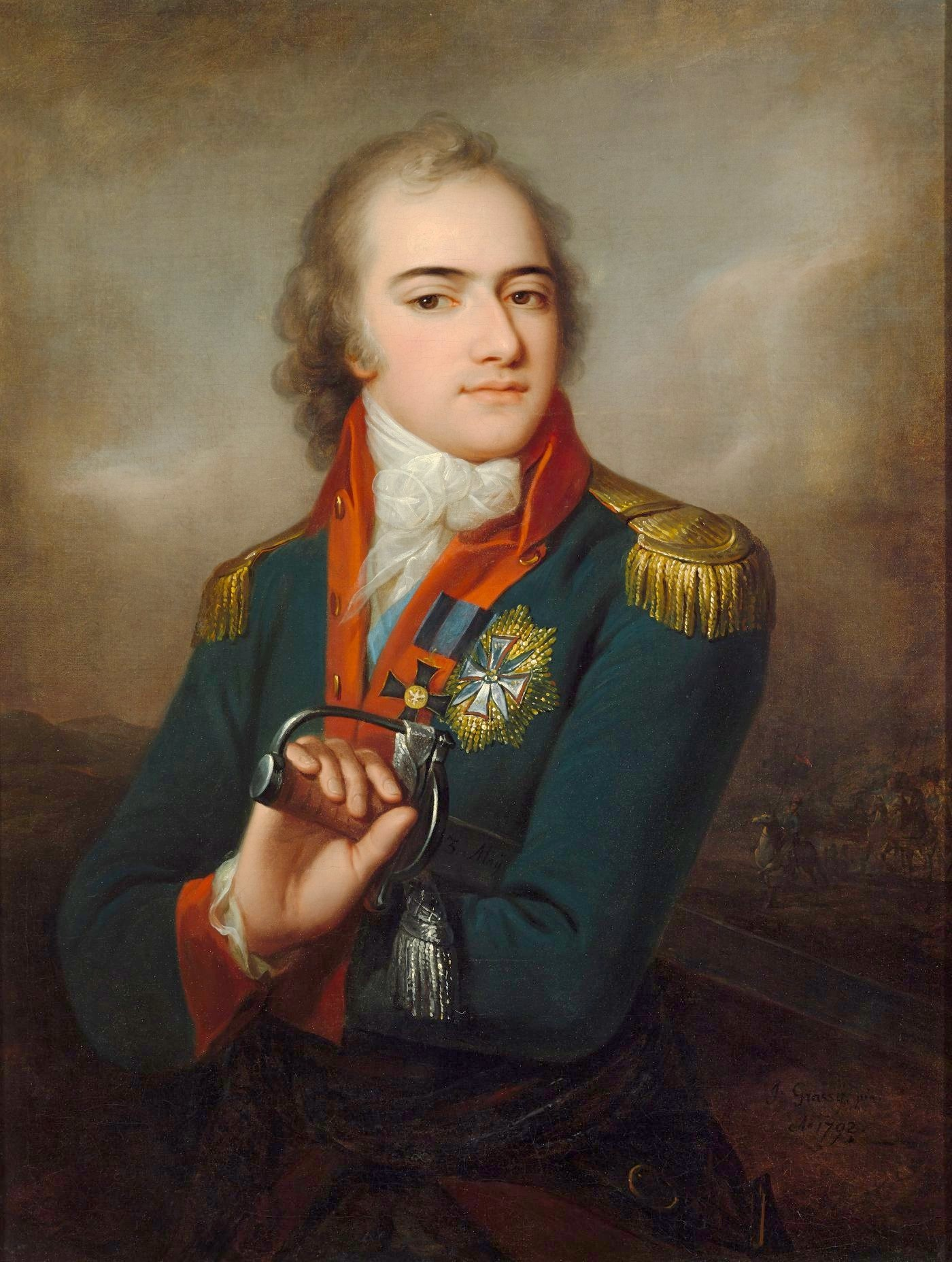
Poniatowski in 1792

The Battle of Zieleńce on 18 June was the first major victorious engagement of the Polish forces since John III Sobieski. Poniatowski personally got involved in the fighting when one of the Polish columns was faltering. To celebrate the victory and commemorate the occasion, the Polish king established the Virtuti Militari order, with which he decorated Poniatowski and Kościuszko first. At the Battle of Dubienka fought by Kościuszko and his soldiers on 18 July, the line of the Southern Bug River was defended for five days against fourfold odds.

The Polish armies converged on Warsaw and prepared for a general engagement. There a courier from the capital informed the Commander in Chief that King Stanislaus had acceded to the pro-Russian Targowica Confederation and had pledged the adherence of the Polish Army to it as well. All hostilities were to be suspended.

The army remained loyal to Prince Józef and he considered staging a coup d'état option that involved kidnapping the King, but after issuing contradictory orders, he finally decided not to do so. Supposedly distressed by the political situation, at the last skirmish of the war at Markuszów on 26 July he supposedly sought his own death, but was saved. After an indignant but fruitless protest, Poniatowski and most of the other Polish generals resigned their commissions and left the army.

In a farewell gesture, Prince Józef's soldiers expressed their gratitude by having a memorial medal minted, and wrote to the Prince's mother in Prague, thanking her for having such a great son. Poniatowski left Warsaw for Vienna, from where he repeatedly challenged the Targowica leader Szczęsny Potocki to a duel. However, the Russian authorities wanted him removed away from Poland even further, and the fearful king pressured him to comply. Poniatowski left Vienna to travel in western Europe, which at the time was traumatized by the violent events of the French Revolution.

In 1792 in a letter to the King, Prince Józef expressed his opinion that in order to save the country and preserve the Polish-Lithuanian Commonwealth he should have already at the outset of this campaign (since it was not properly prepared militarily) raised the whole country, led the nobility on a horse, armed the towns and given freedom to the peasants. The Polish–Russian War was followed by the Second Partition of Polish-Lithuanian Commonwealth.

== 1794 Kościuszko Uprising ==
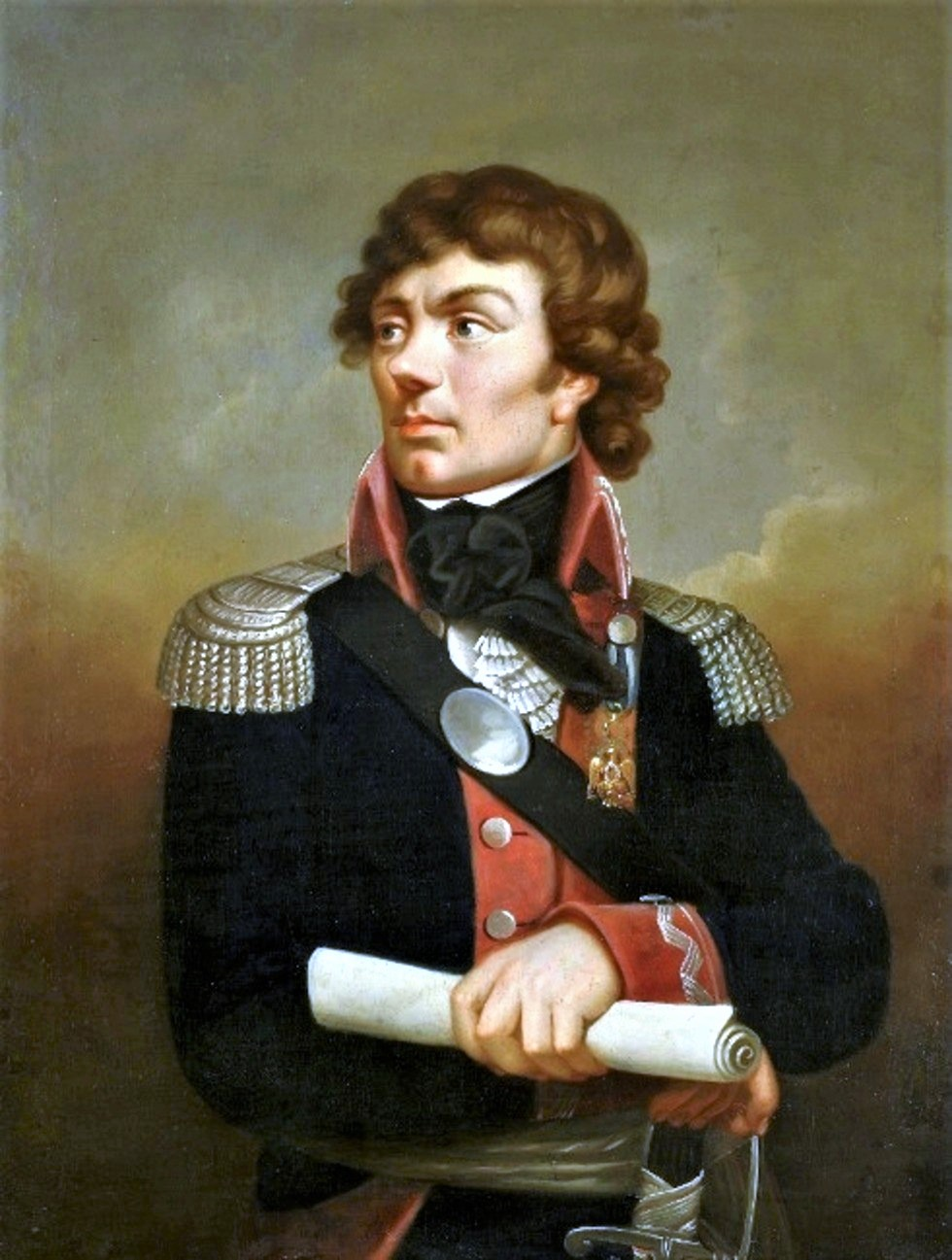
Tadeusz Kościuszko under whom Poniatowski served during the 1794 Uprising

Stanislaus Augustus wrote to his nephew in the spring of 1794, urging him to return to Commonwealth and volunteer for service under his former subordinate Kościuszko, in what came to be known as the Kościuszko Uprising. Poniatowski came with Wielhorski again and reported for duty at Kościuszko's camp near Jędrzejów on 27 May. Kościuszko proposed that Prince Józef lead the insurrection in Lithuania, where he was demoting the radical and successful leader Jakub Jasiński. However, Poniatowski not wanting to be so far from his uncle who needed him, declined. He suggested instead Wielhorski, which Kościuszko approved.

Poniatowski himself participated in combat in and around Warsaw; as a division commander he fought at Błonie between 7 and 10 July, and led cavalry in an anti-Prussian diversion at Marymont on 26–27 July. During the Prussian siege of the city Mokronowski was sent to Lithuania to replace the ailing Wielhorski and Poniatowski was given his post in Warsaw's defense.

Between 5 and 10 August, in a victorious and promising series of confrontations, he took the Góry Szwedzkie region from the Prussians and then lost it after a couple of weeks in a counterattack, for which, despite Kościuszko's warnings, he did not properly prepare. He was injured while trying to recover the lost ground when his horse was shot from under him. In October he led his outnumbered troops in an attack on Prussian entrenchments at the Bzura River, which, at the cost of heavy losses, tied up the Prussians and saved Dąbrowski's corps by allowing it to return to Warsaw.

During the course of the war and revolution the Prince felt alienated by the actions and influence of the radical wing led by Hugo Kołłątaj, while the military cooperation between him, Dąbrowski, and Józef Zajączek was not what it should have been, and worsened after Kościuszko's capture at Maciejowice.

== Withdrawal into private life ==
The Insurrection having failed, Poniatowski stayed for a while in Warsaw, his estates were confiscated, but having refused a position in the Russian army and unwilling to comply with the loyalty conditions that the Russian authorities wanted to impose on him, was ordered to leave the Polish capital and in April 1795 moved once more to Vienna. The Kościuszko Rising led to the Third (and final) Partition of Poland.

1796 saw the death of Catherine II of Russia. Her son, Tsar Paul I returned Poniatowski's estates and again tried to hire him into the Russian army. To excuse himself, Prince Józef claimed being in an extremely poor health as a result of past wounds.

In 1798, however, his uncle, the former king and grand duke Stanislaus Augustus, died in St. Petersburg. Poniatowski left Vienna for his funeral and to arrange for the proper disposition of the late king's finances, inheritance and obligations. He stayed in St. Petersburg for several months, and then, being on good terms with Tsar Paul and his court, returned to Poland, into his estates in Warsaw (Copper-Roof and Myślewicki palaces) and in Jabłonna. Warsaw at that time was under Prussian rule.

There until 1806, Poniatowski lived a private life of parties and play, politically not very active, often shocking the public opinion by the conduct of himself and his friends. His household was managed strictly by one Henriette de Vauban, an older woman whom he brought from Vienna and who was apparently able to exert a great deal of influence over the Prince.

His residences were open to various personalities. The future King Louis XVIII, brother of Louis XVI who was executed by the Revolution, who needed a place to stay with his family and court, was Poniatowski's guest at the Łazienki Palace for a few years after 1801. In 1802, beset by legal troubles stemming from Stanislaus' succession, Poniatowski made a trip to Berlin, where he stayed for months and established cordial personal relations with the Prussian royal family.

Prince Józef never married; had two sons with two of his unmarried partners, the first one Józef Szczęsny Poniatowski (1791–1860) with the singer Zelia Sitańska and Karol Józef Maurycy Poniatowski (1809–1855) with married Zofia Czosnowska, by birth Countess Potocka.

== Duchy of Warsaw and victory in the Austro-Polish War ==
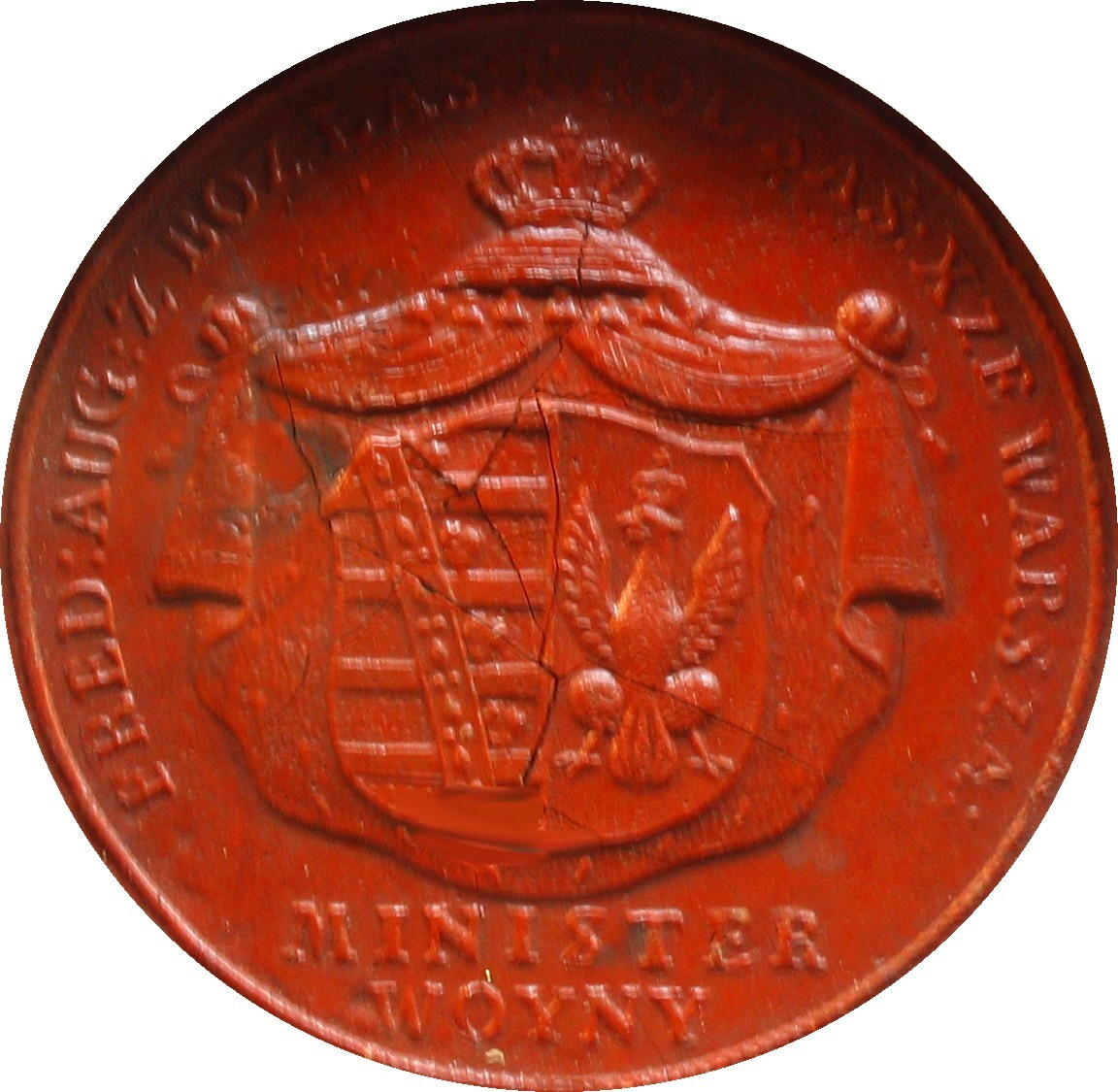
Seal of Poniatowski as Minister of War of the Duchy of Warsaw

Following French Emperor Napoleon I's victory at the Battle of Jena and the ensuing evacuation by Prussia of her Polish provinces, in November 1806 Poniatowski was asked by the Prussian king Frederick William III to assume the governorship of Warsaw, to which he agreed; he also assumed the command of the city's municipal guard and citizen militia forces organized by local residents. All of this turned out to be a short-lived Polish provisional authority, because the quick succession of events on the European scene presented the Poles with new opportunities and forced upon them new choices.

At the end of that year Joachim Murat and his forces entered Warsaw and Poniatowski had to define his role within this new political reality. It took protracted negotiations with Murat (they liked each other and quickly became friends) and persuasion by Józef Wybicki (who urged the Prince to get on board, before the window of historic opportunity closed), but before the year was over Poniatowski was declared by Murat to be "chief of the military force" and was leading the military department on behalf of the French authorities. Dąbrowski, who was the choice of many Polish veterans of the Polish Legions and of the Insurrection, as well as Zajączek were bypassed, even though they both had served under Napoleon when Poniatowski was inactive. On 14 January 1807, by the Emperor's decree, the Warsaw Governing Commission was created under Stanisław Małachowski, and within this structure Poniatowski became officially Director of the Department of War and set about organizing the Polish army.

In July 1807 the Duchy of Warsaw was created. In its government Poniatowski on 7 October became Minister of War and Head of Army of the Duchy of Warsaw (minister wojny i naczelny wódz wojsk Ks. Warszawskiego), while Napoleon, not yet quite trusting him, left the supreme military command in Davout's hands until summer of 1808. Poniatowski officially became Commander in Chief on 21 March 1809. The Minister of War became completely devoted to the creation and development of this new, ostentatiously Polish army. The Duchy's army existed and operated under the most difficult circumstances and its success depended largely on the military and political skills of the chief commander. For example, it was severely underfunded and most of the military units were kept by Napoleon outside of the country, to be used in numerous campaigns, which is why Prince Józef had a rather small force at his disposal during the war of 1809.

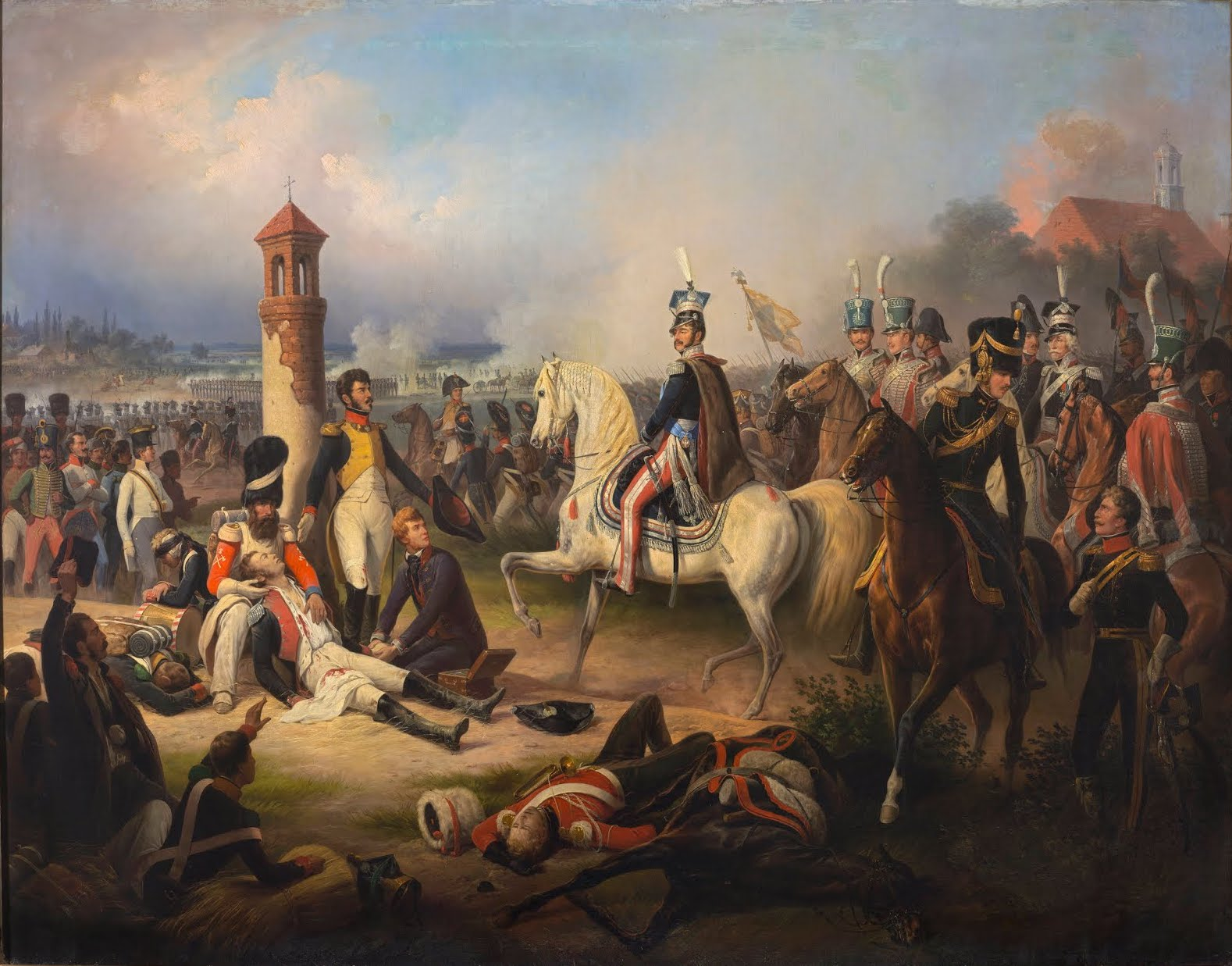
The Death of Cyprian Godebski at Raszyn by January Suchodolski, 1855. Poniatowski at the Battle of Raszyn

In spring of 1809 Poniatowski led his army against an Austrian invasion under the Archduke Ferdinand Karl Joseph of Austria-Este, in the war that was regarded by Austrian high command as a crucial element of their struggle with Napoleonic France. At the bloody Battle of Raszyn near Warsaw on 19 April, where he personally led his men in an infantry bayonet charge (throughout his career he did a number of these), Polish forces under Poniatowski's command fought to a standstill an Austrian force twice their number. Afterwards however decided not to defend Warsaw and withdrew with his units to the east bank of the Vistula River, to the fortified Praga suburb, which the Austrians attacked, but were defeated at Grochowo on 26 April. An Austrian division then crossed the Vistula again trying to pursue the Poles, but was routed on 2 May at Góra Kalwaria in a daring attack led by General Michał Sokolnicki. Ferdinand made a couple of attempts more, trying to establish a bridgehead on the other side of the Vistula, but those were defeated, which left the initiative in Poniatowski's hands. From there he quickly advanced south, staying close to the Vistula to control the situation and taking over large areas of Galicia, that is southern Poland that was controlled by Austria under the partitioning arrangement. On 14 May Lublin was taken, on the 18th fortified and vigorously defended Sandomierz. On the 20th the Zamość fortress was overpowered, where 2000 prisoners and 40 cannons were taken, and even further east Lwów was taken on 27 May. These military developments compelled the Austrians to withdraw from Warsaw — a counteroffensive by their main force resulted in the retaking of Sandomierz on 18 June.

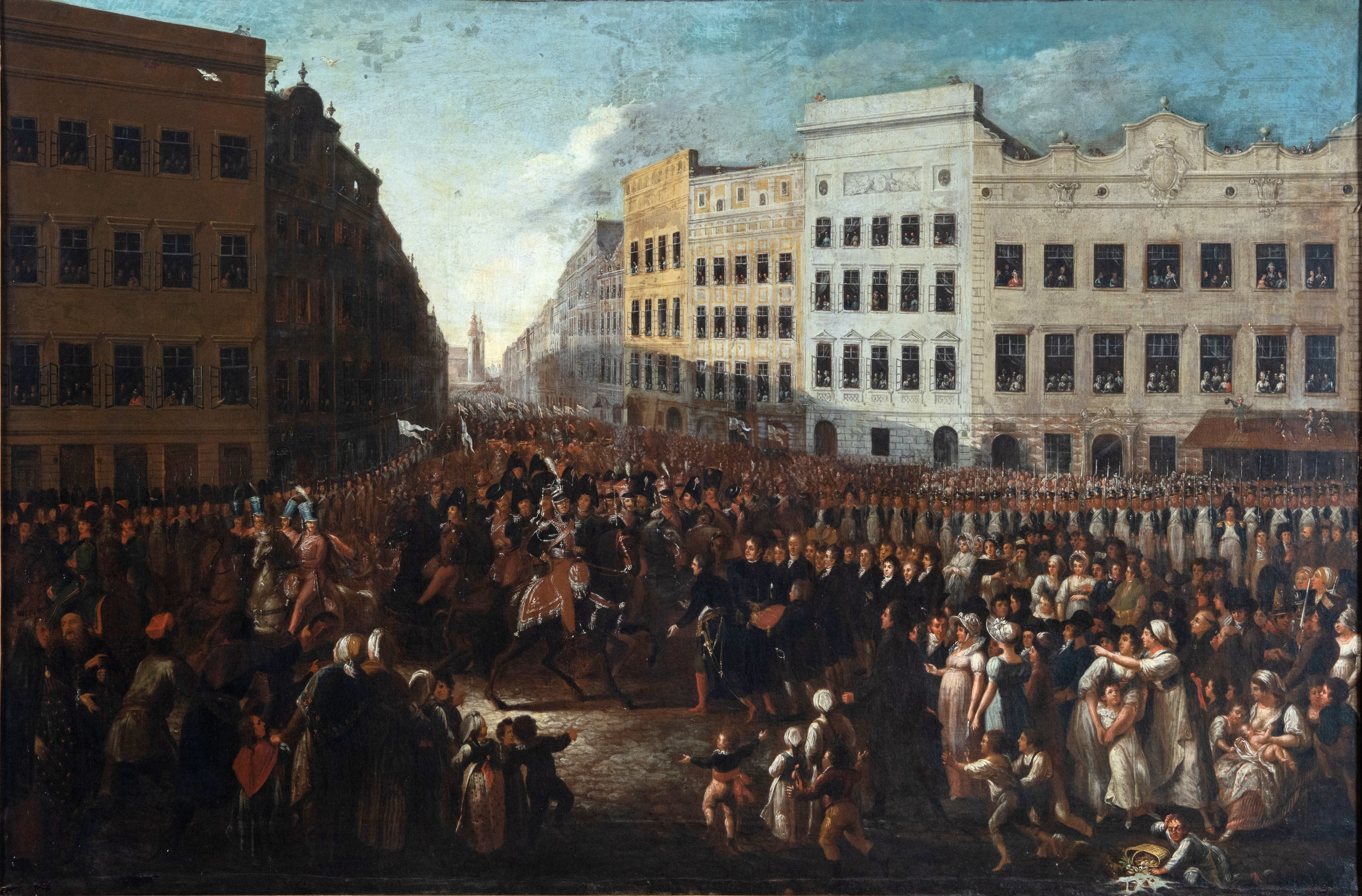
Poniatowski entering Kraków in July 1809

But Poniatowski in the meantime moved west of the Vistula and on 5 July, the day of the Battle of Wagram, began from Radom, his new southbound offensive aimed at Kraków. He arrived there on 15 July, and while the demoralized and not capable of effective defense Austrians tried to turn the city over to the Russians, Poniatowski at this point was not to be outmaneuvered or intimidated: Seeing a Russian hussar cavalry unit in attack formation blocking the street leading to the bridge on the Vistula, he rode his raised up horse into them, so that several flipped as they were falling.

Most of the liberated lands, with the exception of the Lviv region, became incorporated into the Duchy through the peace treaty of 14 October 1809. Prince Józef himself, celebrated by the residents of the old royal capital of Poland, remained in Kraków until the end of December, supervising the provisional Galician government in existence from 2 June to 28 December. The Austrians kept demanding the return of Kraków and he felt that his presence there was the best assurance that the city would remain in Polish hands.

== Napoleon's Russian campaign ==
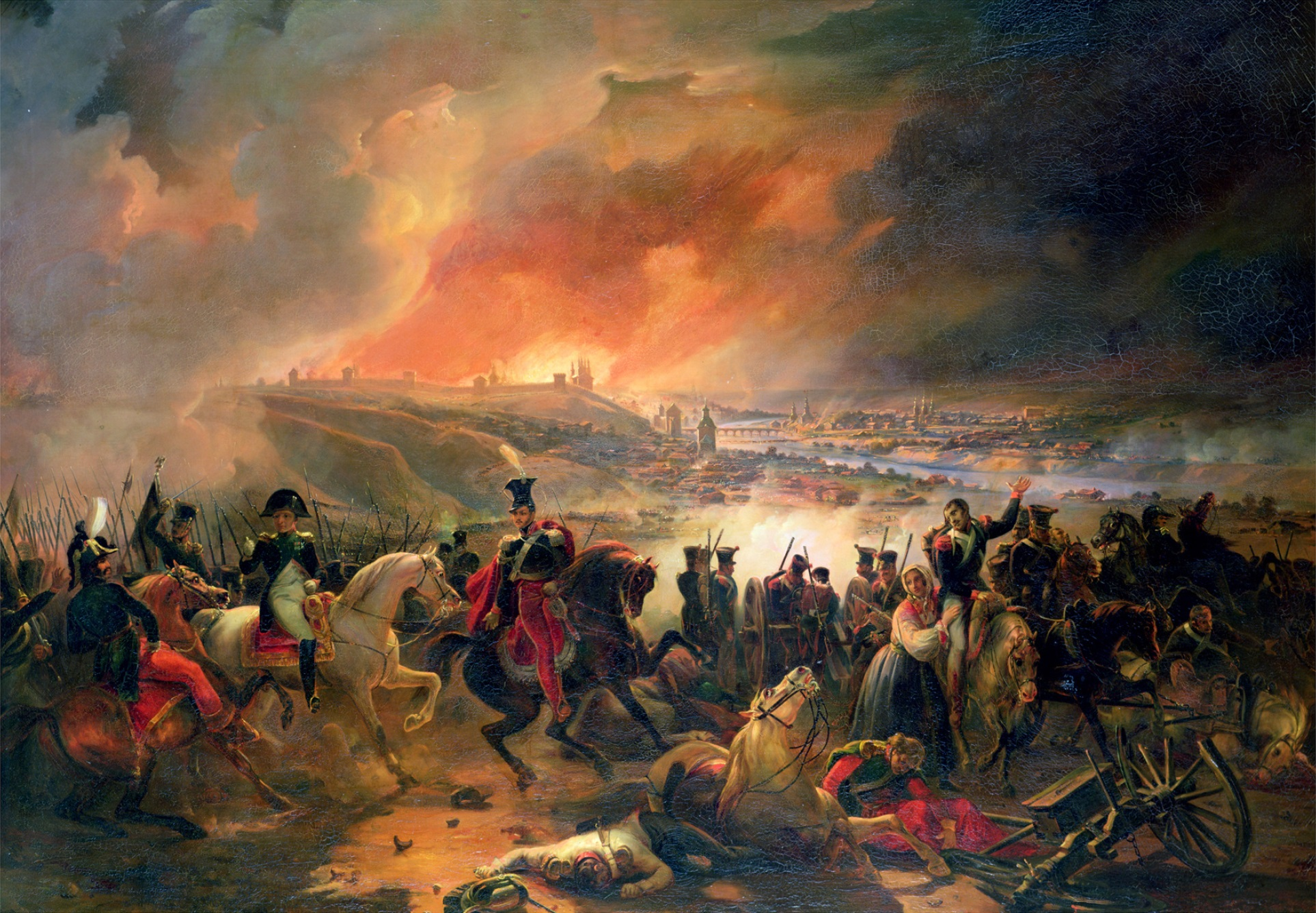
The Battle of Smolensk by Jean-Charles Langlois. Napoleon and Poniatowski before the burning city of Smolensk, by Jean-Charles Langlois. Poniatowski loyally served the Emperor, particularly during the campaign in Russia, where his corps fought with distinction at Smolensk and Borodino

In April 1811 Poniatowski went to Paris, where he represented the King of Saxony and Duke of Warsaw Frederick Augustus I at the baptism ceremonies of Napoleon's son. He stayed there for four months and worked with the Emperor and his generals on plans for the campaign against Russia. He tried to convince the French leaders that the southern route, through the current day Ukraine would provide the most benefits. Not only was the region warmer, Polish gentry from the Russian partition would join in, and possible Turkish action against Russia could be supported, which was the most advantageous theater for the upcoming war. Napoleon rejected the idea, as well as the back-up scenario, according to which Poniatowski would follow such a route alone with the Polish corps, hoping to take over these formerly Polish areas with the expected help from a Polish uprising planned there. For the Russian Campaign of 1812 Poniatowski became commander of V Corps of the Grande Armée — at nearly 100,000 strong Polish forces in the Grande Armée were the greatest Polish military effort before the 20th century.

The initial period of the offensive, when Poniatowski was placed under the direction of Jérôme Bonaparte, was wasted, but after Napoleon's brother left Poniatowski was briefly put in charge of Grande Armée's right wing. Fighting on the avant-garde on the advance to Moscow he distinguished himself at a number of battles. On 17 August at Smolensk he personally led his corps' assault on the city. On 7 September at Borodino the V Corps was involved in the daylong fight over the Utitza Mound, which was finally taken toward the evening, stormed by the entire corps led by Prince Józef again. On 14 September the Polish soldiers were the first ones to enter the Russian capital; by that time however Poniatowski, unlike Napoleon, was convinced that the campaign was doomed. The Polish corps fought then the battles at Chirikovo on 29 September and Vinkovo on 18 October, where Poniatowski saved Murat from a complete defeat by Kutuzov's forces.

Rearguarding the retreat of the Grande Armée, Poniatowski was badly injured during the Battle of Vyazma. He continued in active service for a few days, but his condition forced him to give his command to Józef Zajączek. He then continued the westbound trip in a carriage with two wounded aides, the Legion of the Vistula and Michel Claparède. At the Berezina crossing they barely avoided being captured by the Russians but finally, on 12 December, arrived in Warsaw.

== German campaign of 1813 and death at Leipzig ==
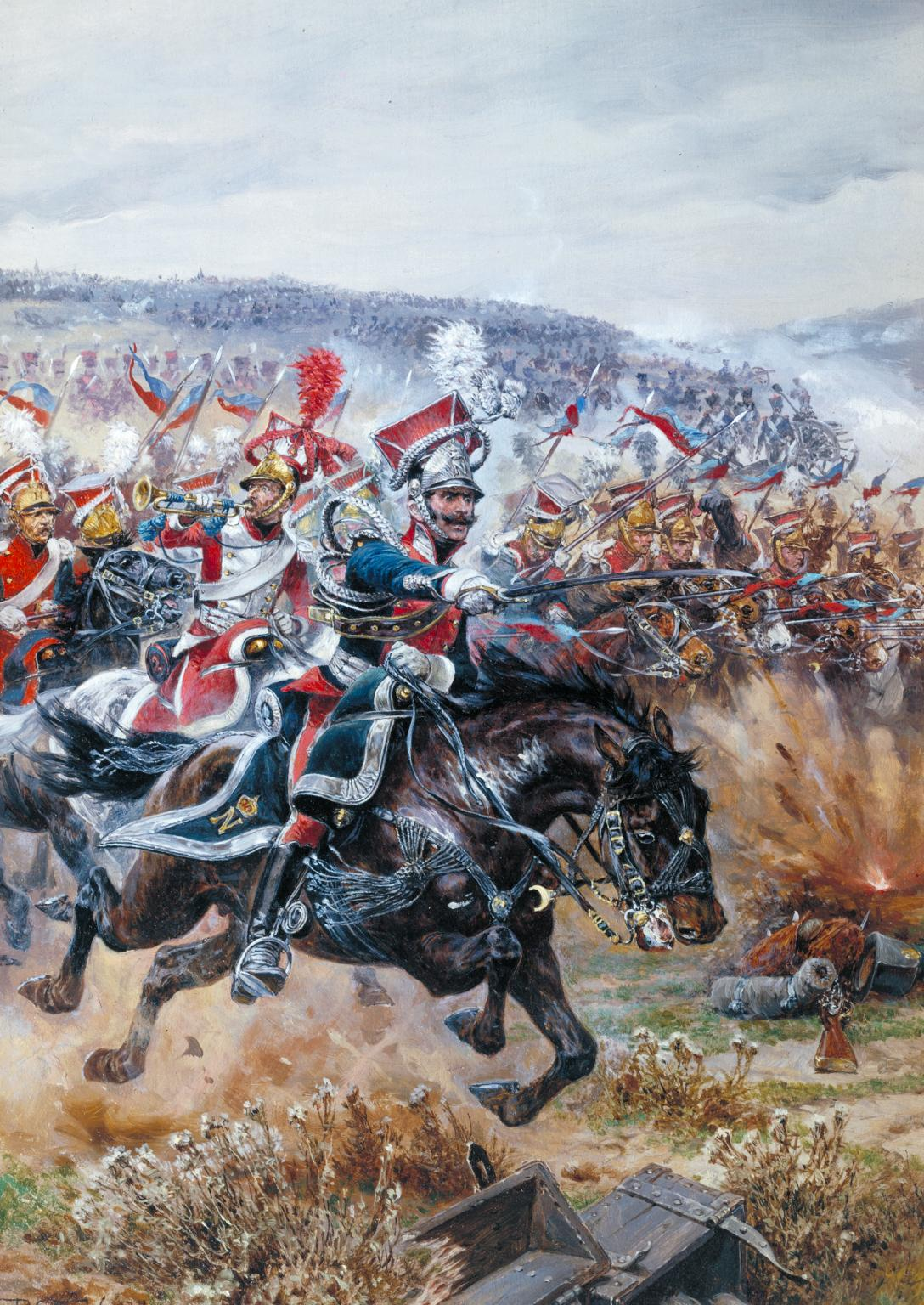
Poniatowski's Last Charge at Leipzig (Richard Caton Woodville Jr., 1912)

After the disastrous retreat of Napoleon's army, and while recovering from his injuries, Poniatowski quickly undertook the rebuilding of the Polish army in order to replace the forces devastated by the Moscow campaign. When many Polish leaders began to waver in their allegiance to the French Emperor, Poniatowski resisted this change of opinion and remained faithful to Napoleon, even when Tsar Alexander I offered him amnesty and proposed future cooperation. With the new army only partially completed, on 5 February, as the Russian army was about to enter Warsaw, the Polish units moved out, not sure of their immediate purpose. Eventually they reached Kraków, where they stayed for a few weeks getting ready.

On 7 May, as the Russians were getting close again, Prince Józef and his army left Kraków, went through Bohemia, where, as the VIII Corps, they guarded the passes of the Bohemian mountains and defended the left bank of the Elbe River, to Saxony. The total forces with which he joined Napoleon during the armistice numbered 22,000, which included a small, separately operating Dąbrowski's division.

The corps fought major successful battles at Löbau on 9 September, and at Zedtlitz on 10 October, where General Pahlen attempted to stop their movement toward Leipzig, but was defeated in a cavalry charge led by Poniatowski. On 12 October he was about to sit down with Murat at the breakfast table, when they were surprised by enemy units. Poniatowski got on his horse, broke through (receiving a superficial wound in the arm) and returned with another timely cavalry charge, saving the situation. As a reward for his services, on 16 October during the Battle of Leipzig, Poniatowski was made a Marshal of the Empire and entrusted with the duty of covering the French Army's retreat. He defended Leipzig, losing half his corps in the attempt, finally falling back slowly upon a bridge over the river White Elster, near Leipzig. In the general confusion, the French blew up the bridge before he could reach it. Poniatowski tried to escape across the Elstermühlgraben (at modern Gottschedstrasse 42, today the location of the Bridge blasting monument) but, was badly injured and probably shot by his allies by mistake, and drowned in the river.

== Personal life ==
Poniatowski never married; he had two sons from two extramarital partners:

Józef Szczęsny Khmelnytsky (1791-1860) from the singer Zelia Sitanska, recorded under the name of his adoptive father, served in the Austrian army, died a childless bachelor.

Karol Józef Maurycy Poniatowski (1809–1855)from Zofia Czosnowska, a Countess Potocka. His birth surname was Ponitycki, but he was later adopted by a relative, who gave him the surname Poniatowski (like his biological father). He served in the French army, married an Englishwoman, and had a son (who died childless) and a daughter (who had many children).

== Legacy ==
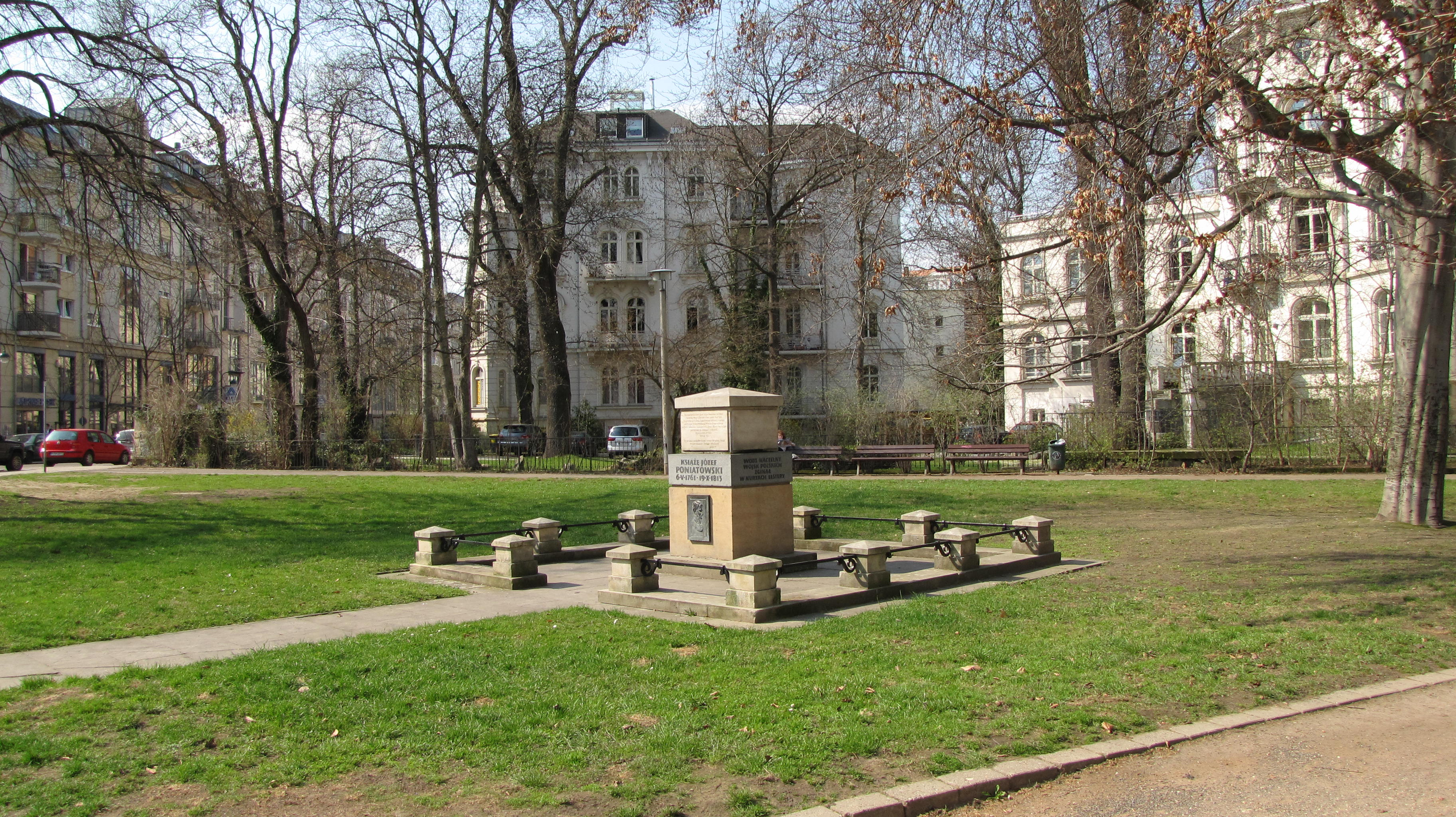
Monument to Poniatowski in Leipzig, Germany

Poniatowski's cult developed after his death, as a Polish version of the Napoleonic legend. His remains were transported to Poland in 1817 and buried in the cathedral on Kraków's Wawel Hill, where he lies beside Tadeusz Kościuszko and John III Sobieski.

In 1829 his monument by Bertel Thorvaldsen was erected in Warsaw. It was destroyed during World War II, but a recent copy, the Monument to Prince Józef Poniatowski, is still standing before the presidential palace in Warsaw.

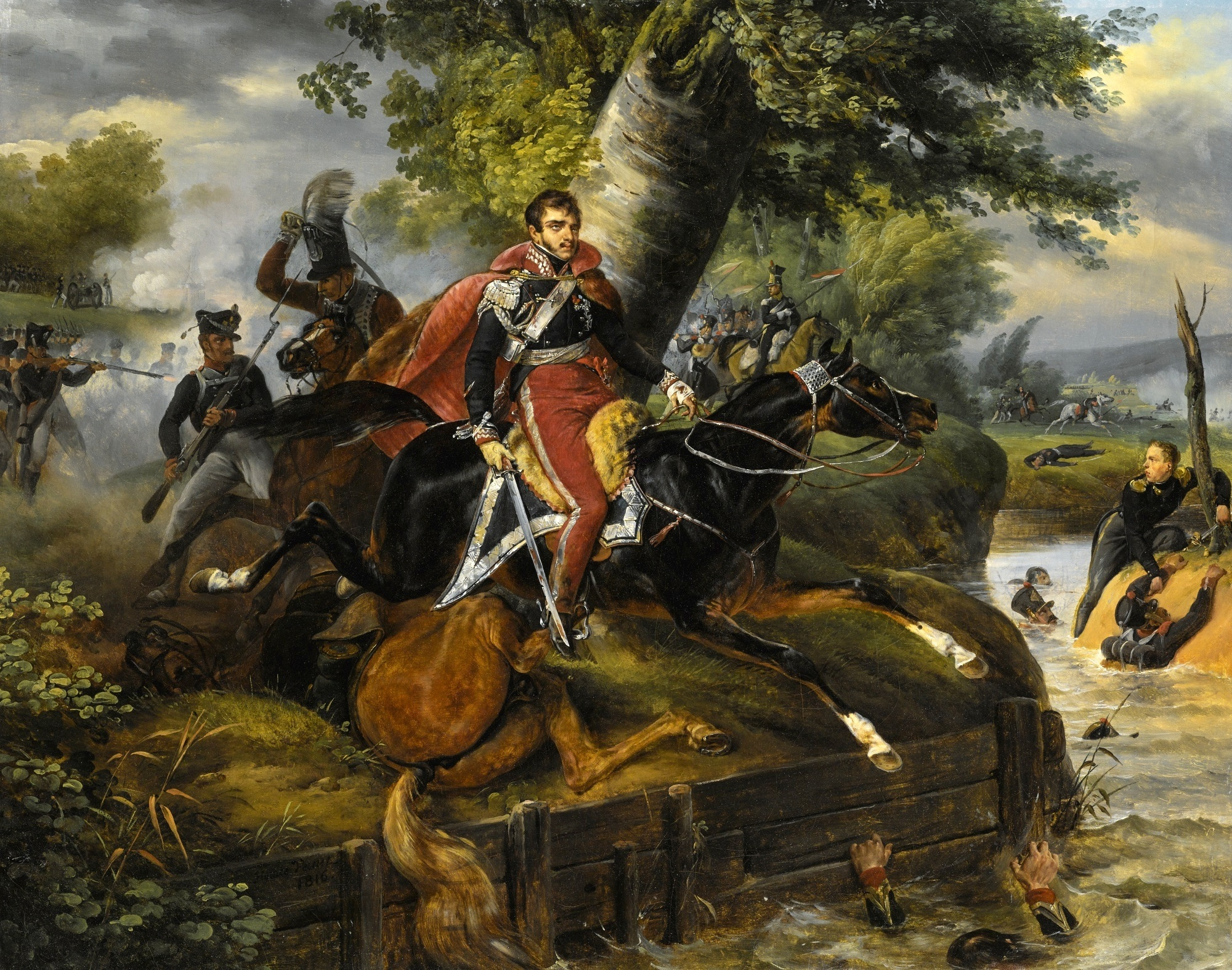
The Death of Prince Poniatowski by Horace Vernet, 1816

Poniatowski never married and had only illegitimate issues. Among his living relatives is Elena Poniatowska, a Mexican journalist.

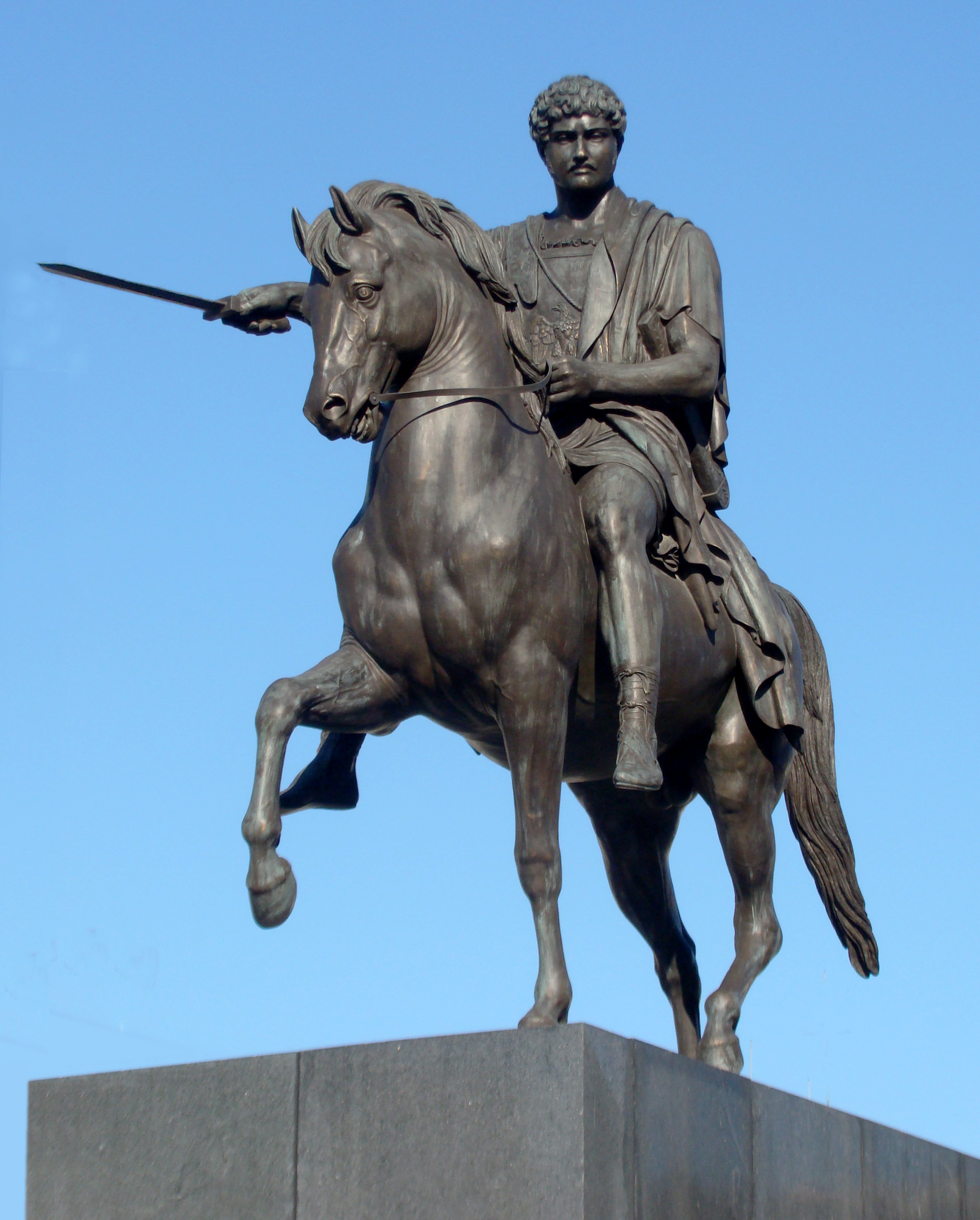
Bertel Thorvaldsen's equestrian statue of Poniatowski in front of the Presidential Palace in Warsaw

He is one of the figures immortalized in Jan Matejko's 1891 painting, Constitution of 3 May 1791.

He was an inspiration for Polish freedom fighters throughout a number of armed conflicts, but especially during the November Uprising of 1830, since many of its leaders had served under Poniatowski's command during the Napoleonic Wars. The Duchy of Warsaw, which Napoleon had created and Poniatowski defended, remained as a residual Polish state to the end of the Partitions period.

A Japanese manga, Ten no Hate made - Porando hishi, was written by Riyoko Ikeda in 1991, commemorating the life of Józef Poniatowski.

A Polish bomber squadron, named after Poniatowski, took part in aerial operations during the Second World War. It was 304 Sqn. RAF "Land of Silesia" Polish Bomber Squadron (Ziemi Śląskiej im. Ks. Józefa Poniatowskiego) which mainly flew Fairey Battle, Vickers Wellington, Vickers Warwick and Handley Page Halifax bombers. Their base airfield was mostly RAF Chivenor in Devon.

Welsh-Polish historian Norman Davies wrote:

Like many of his countrymen, he had wavered long before throwing in his lot with the French. For him, Napoleonic service had demanded a painful change of direction and loyalties. It had involved years of devotion and blood-letting. To have changed his loyalties yet again, as his master the King of Saxony did, was all too worrying for an infinitely weary and honest man. Like the rest of his generation he hoped; he fought; he served; and only found rest in honorable defeat.

== See also ==
- Stanisław August Poniatowski – Stanislaus Augustus
- Poniatowski family
- 37th Łęczyca Infantry Regiment - Named after Józef Poniatowski
- Ten no Hate Made – Poland Hishi - Japanese manga about Poniatowski
