= Cyprian Godebski (poet) =

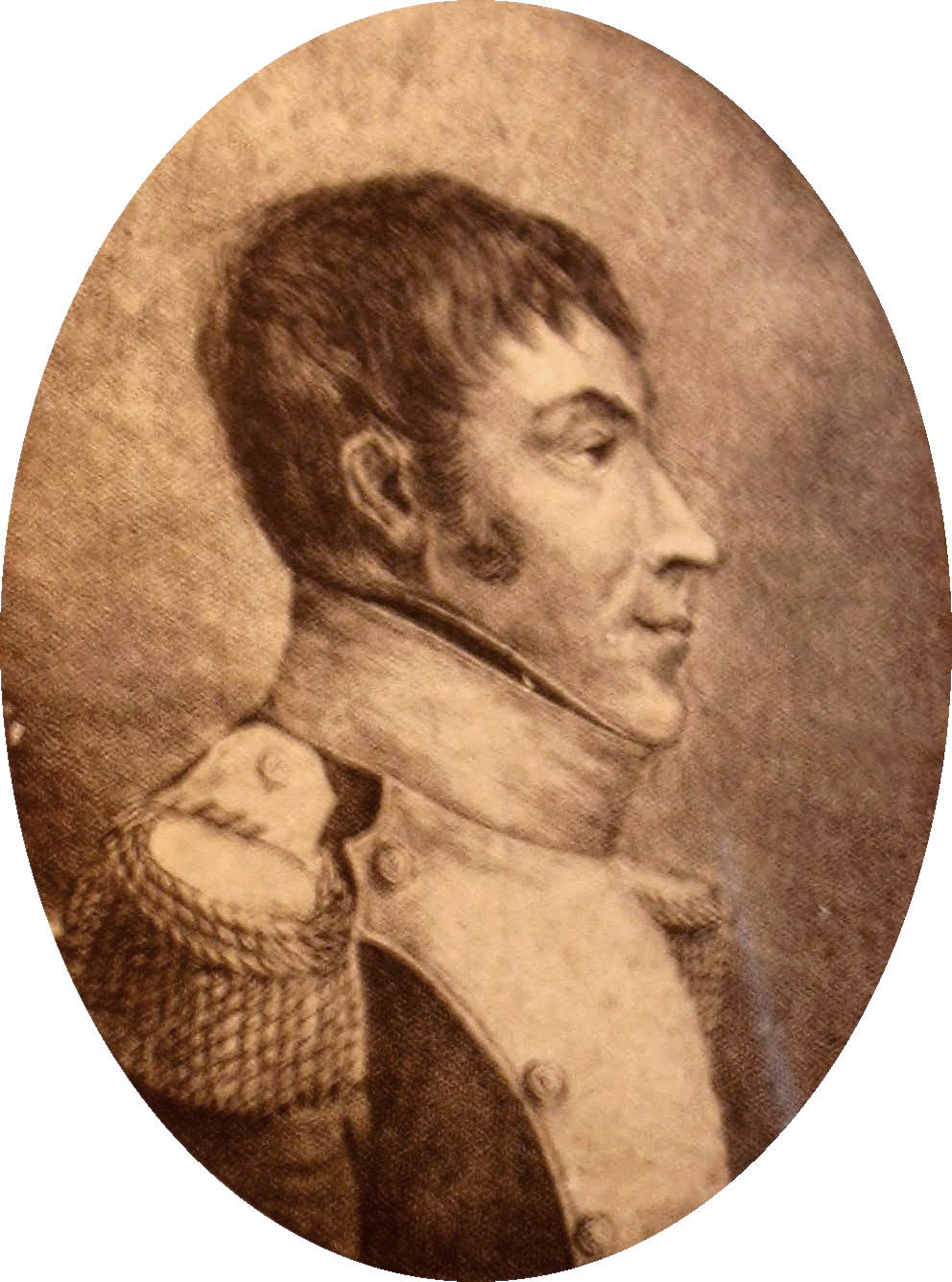
- Born: 1765
- Died: 1809 (aged 43–44)
- Military career
- Unit: Polish Legions
- Conflicts: Battle of Raszyn

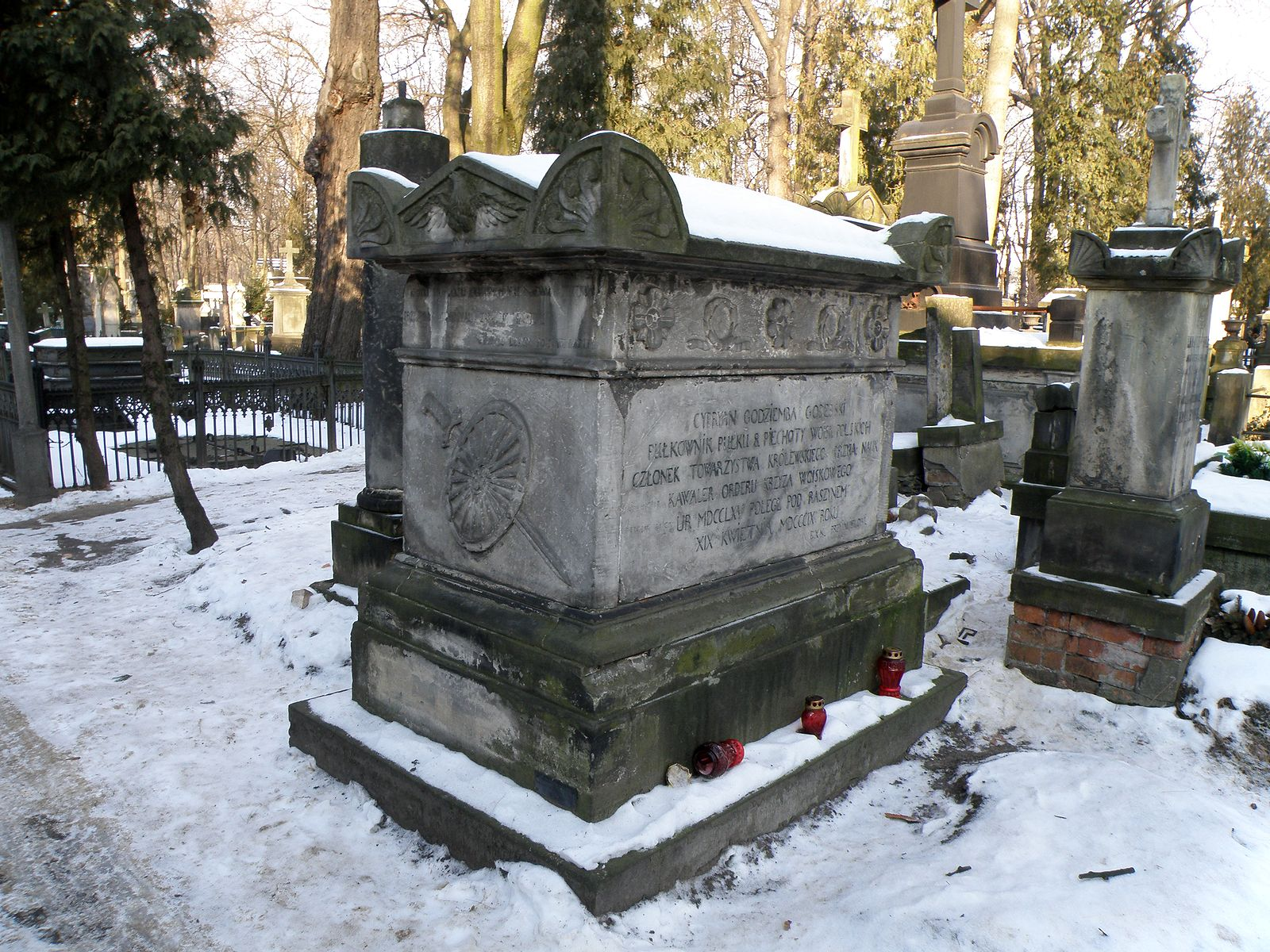
Grave of Cyprian Godebski in Powązki Cemetery, Warsaw

Cyprian Godebski (1765 – 19 April 1809) was a Polish poet, novelist and father of writer Franciszek Ksawery. He was an outstanding poet of the so-called "Legions Poetry".

== Life ==
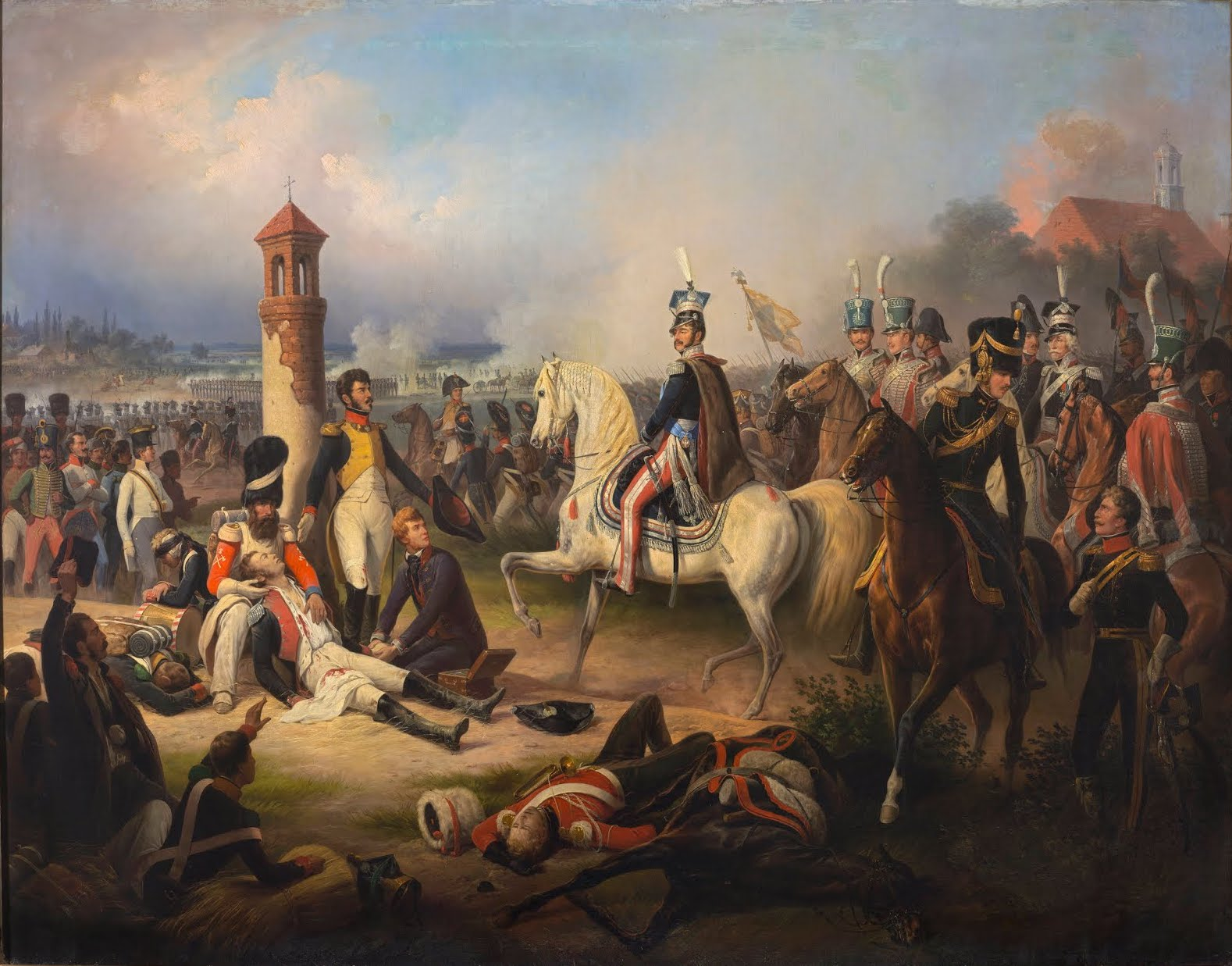
The Death of Cyprian Godebski at Raszyn by January Suchodolski, 1855

Godebski served in the Polish Legions from 1798 until 1801. From 1803 to 1806 he became, together with Ksawery Kossecki, publisher and editor of the "Zabawy Przyjemne i Pozyteczne" almanac. From 1805 he was a member of the Friends of Science Society. In 1806 Godebski joined the Polish Army of the Duchy of Warsaw; he had become disillusioned with the policy of Napoleon towards Poland. He died in the Battle of Raszyn in 1809.
