= Russification of Poles during the Partitions =

Russian policy introduced in partitioned Poland

The Russification of Poland (Polish: rusyfikacja na ziemiach polskich; Russian: Русификация Польши, romanized: Rusifikacija Poljši) was an intense process, especially under Partitioned Poland, when the Russian state aimed to denationalise Poles via incremental enforcement of language, culture, the arts, the Orthodox religion and Russian practices. The most forceful Russification was enforced onto children, due to their poor knowledge of Polish culture and language.

== History ==
=== After the November Uprising ===
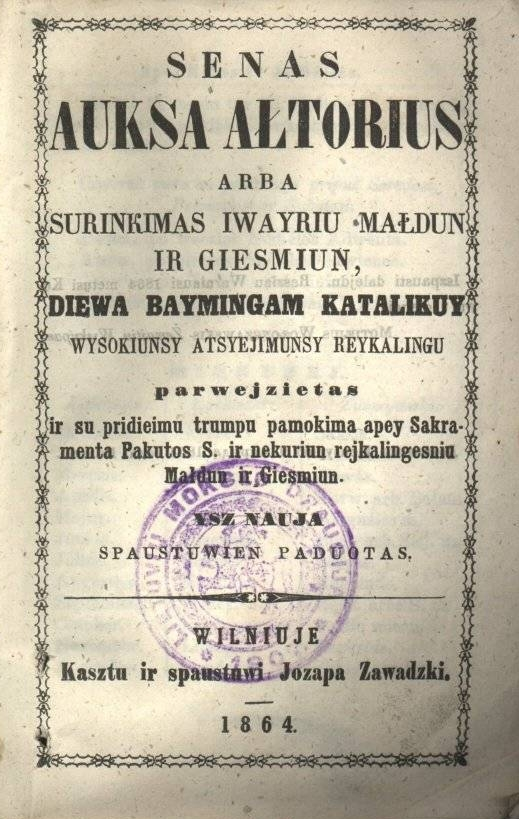
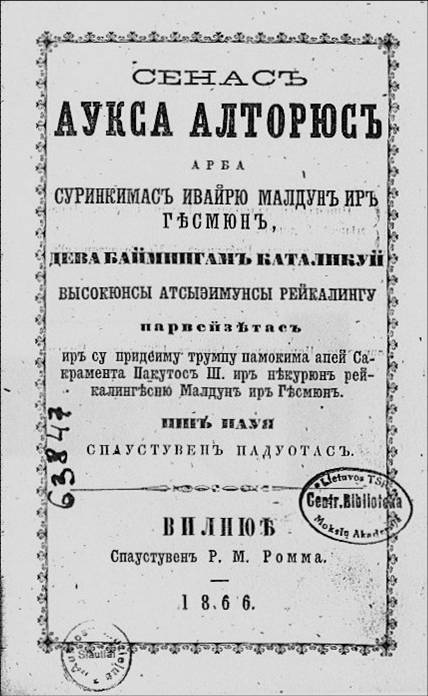
Two issues of the same popular prayer book, Auksa altorius (Golden Altar). The one on the left in Lithuanian language was illegal because it was printed in the Latin alphabet. The one on the right was legal and paid for by the government.

The self-will of Grand Duke Konstantin and the infraction of the Constitution of the Kingdom of Poland, together with the rise of secret societies, led to the November Uprising (1830–1831). The intensification of Russification occurred after the aforesaid uprising failed, leading to the abolishment of the Constitution of 1815 (granting the Kingdom of Poland national autonomy). In 1832, with the implementation of the Organic Statute of the Kingdom of Poland, the Sejm was liquidated along with the Kingdom's armed forces, Russian institutions and law was implemented and any aide to the November Uprising had their landed property seized.

Martial law was implemented in 1833. All decisions were given by Russian military chiefs, and Namiestnik Ivan Paskevich. The retained Council of State (until 1914) had a Russian majority. Gradually, most aspects of society were subject to central authority in St. Petersburg. The Vilnius University, Krzemieniec Lyceum and other Polish gymnasiums were liquidated.

The Russian monetary system was implemented in 1841, followed by the Russian code of law in 1847. The next move forward was to subordinate the Kingdom of Poland to the Russian Namiestnik, Ivan Paskevich. In 1837, Polish voivodeships, forming the administrative division of the Kingdom, were renamed to governates, reflecting the Imperial Russian model.

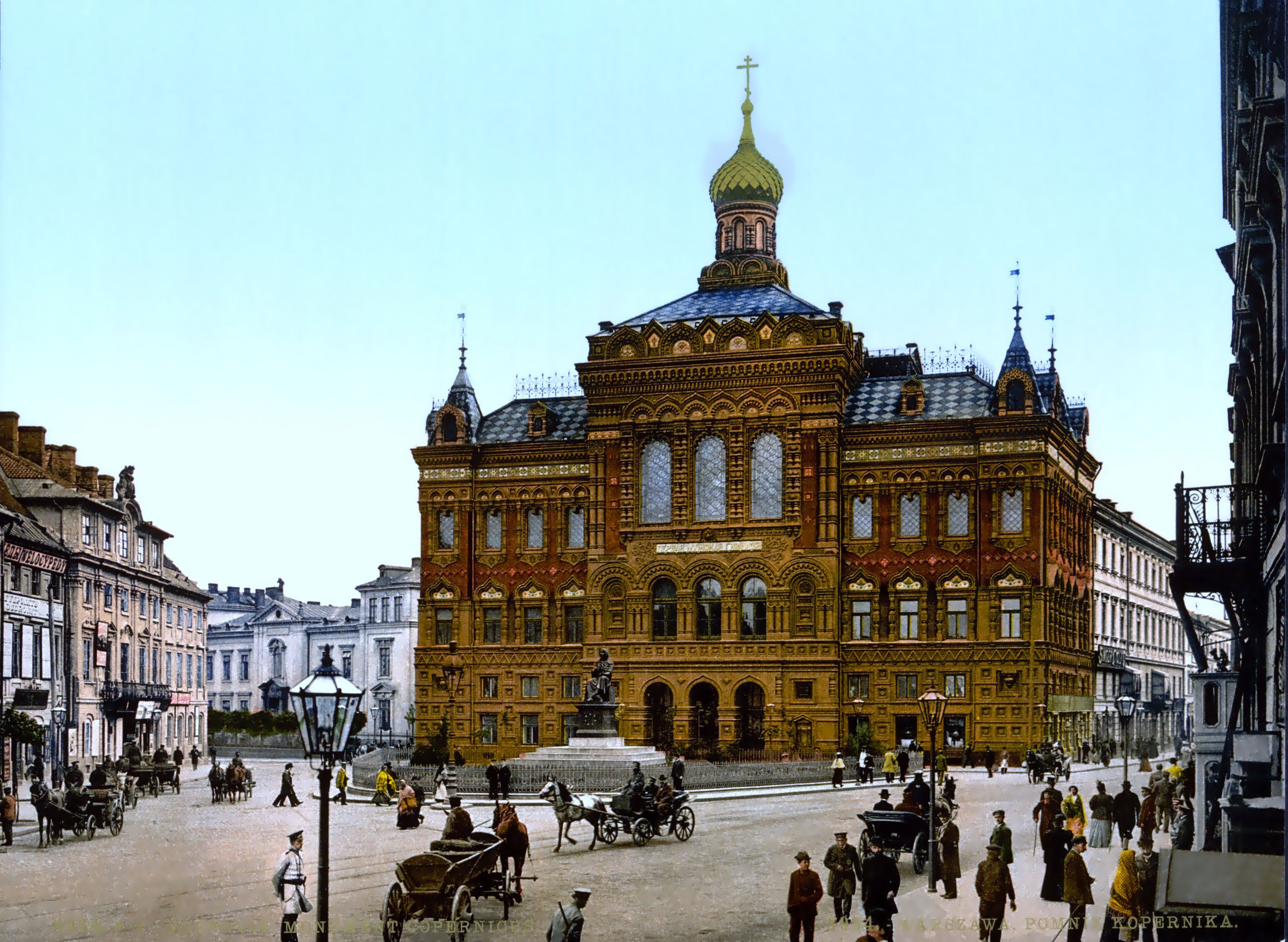
Façade of the Staszic Palace where after 1893, the Tserkva of St. Tatiana of Rome was set up, with a Byzantine–Russian style, showcasing the architectural element of Russification in Warsaw

=== After the January Uprising ===
The next exacerbation of Russification came after the failed January Uprising (1863–1864): the implementation of an interminable, the Russification of administrative and educational institutions, the liquidation of the Uniate Church – in January 1874, Russian soldiers killed at least ten Uniates in Drelów and thirteen in Pratulin. Poles underwent expulsions and were expropriated. Initially, Polish town names were Russified. In 1869, the Warsaw Main School was closed down, and in its location, the Russian language Imperial University was opened. The years 1869–1885 saw the systematic removal of the Polish language from the education system, the end result, in 1885, was its placement as a second, uncompulsory school language. Only religion was taught in Polish. Dmitry Ilovaysky's history text books were enforced in school history classes, falsifying history and as such continually implemented Russification. Additionally, the Russian language was introduced into folk schools. Conclusively, speaking the Polish language was banned in institutions of education. There was also an attempt to introduce the Cyrillic alphabet into Polish.

The budget of the Kingdom of Poland was amalgamated into that of the Russian Empire. In 1874, the position of Namiestnik was replaced by Governate-General. The Governate-General would head the Warsaw Military District that encompassed all of Congress Poland.

The symbolic figure behind the Russification was Governate-General of the Warsaw Military District, Alexander Apukhtin, who inter alia introduced the education of skilled informers and the double-crossing of students, which became fundamental to the policing in schools. In 1869, Russian became the sole legal language for courts and the administration. In 1875, the then Polish court procedure was abolished in favour of its Russian counterpart. Until World War I, the Kingdom of Poland was beset by "extraordinary rights", by which the Governate-General had the authority to bring any civil individual to trial at a military court, or send them into the Russian Far East if they are deemed a "political suspect". In 1885, the Bank of Poland was replaced by a branch of the State Bank of the Russian Empire.

Many Orthodox churches were constructed in Poland under Governor Iosif Gurko. Their presence was intended to manifest Russian rule and underline the "Russianness" of the Polish territories. In the last decade of the 19th century, around 20 Orthodox churches in the characteristic Russo-Byzantine imperial style were built in Warsaw alone.

More radical Russification occurred in parts of the Polish–Lithuanian Commonwealth, that after the Partitions were not incorporated into the Kingdom of Poland and instead directly into the Russian Empire. The Vilnius University and Krzemieniec Lyceum were closed down, as a retribution for the participation of the students in the November Uprising. Between 1832 and 1834, by royal prerogative of Tsar Nicholas I, several thousand Polish families were expelled to Siberia from Wołyn and Podole. When in 1839 the Uniate Church was liquidated, its followers and priests were forced to convert to Eastern Orthodoxy. The Roman Catholic Church saw further restrictions, with its landed wealth seized, after proclaiming support for the January Uprising. Property was similarly seized from the participants of the January Uprising, with land proprietors having an additional tax levied onto their property. It was prohibited for Poles to buy land. Polish theatres, periodicals, schools and societies were liquidated. The aforesaid methods of Russification were also enforced on other non-Russian populations, with the type of severity dependent on the locality.

=== Nicholas II rule ===
During the reign of Nicholas II (1894–1917), significant easing of the regime was noted in Poland. In 1904, the Polish language was allowed in primary schools, and in 1897, all additional taxes on landowners were abolished. The religious issue was also addressed. On April 17, 1905, a decree was issued introducing religious tolerance, which confirmed the rights of all non-Orthodox Christians. Russian-Polish relations were positively affected by all this. With the outbreak of World War I, the Russians planned to create a Polish state under Russian vassalage, and the Poles responded by providing comprehensive support to the Imperial army in the fight against Germany and Austria-Hungary.

== See also ==
- Resistance in partitioned Poland (1795–1918)
- Cyrillization of Polish under the Russian Empire
- Cyrillic transcriptions of Polish
