= Engalitcheff =

Engalitcheff may refer to:

- Nicholas Engalitcheff (1874–1935), Russian diplomat
- Engalitcheff Institute on Comparative Political and Economic Systems at The Fund for American Studies

== See also ==
- Pavel Yengalychev
- Engalychev
