= Cyrillization of Polish =

Cyrillization of Polish may refer to:

- Cyrillization of Polish under the Russian Empire
- Cyrillic transcriptions of Polish
