= Friedrich Wilhelm Rembert von Berg =

Russian nobleman and statesman (1794–1874)

Graf Friedrich Wilhelm Rembert von Berg
- Фёдор Фёдорович Берг
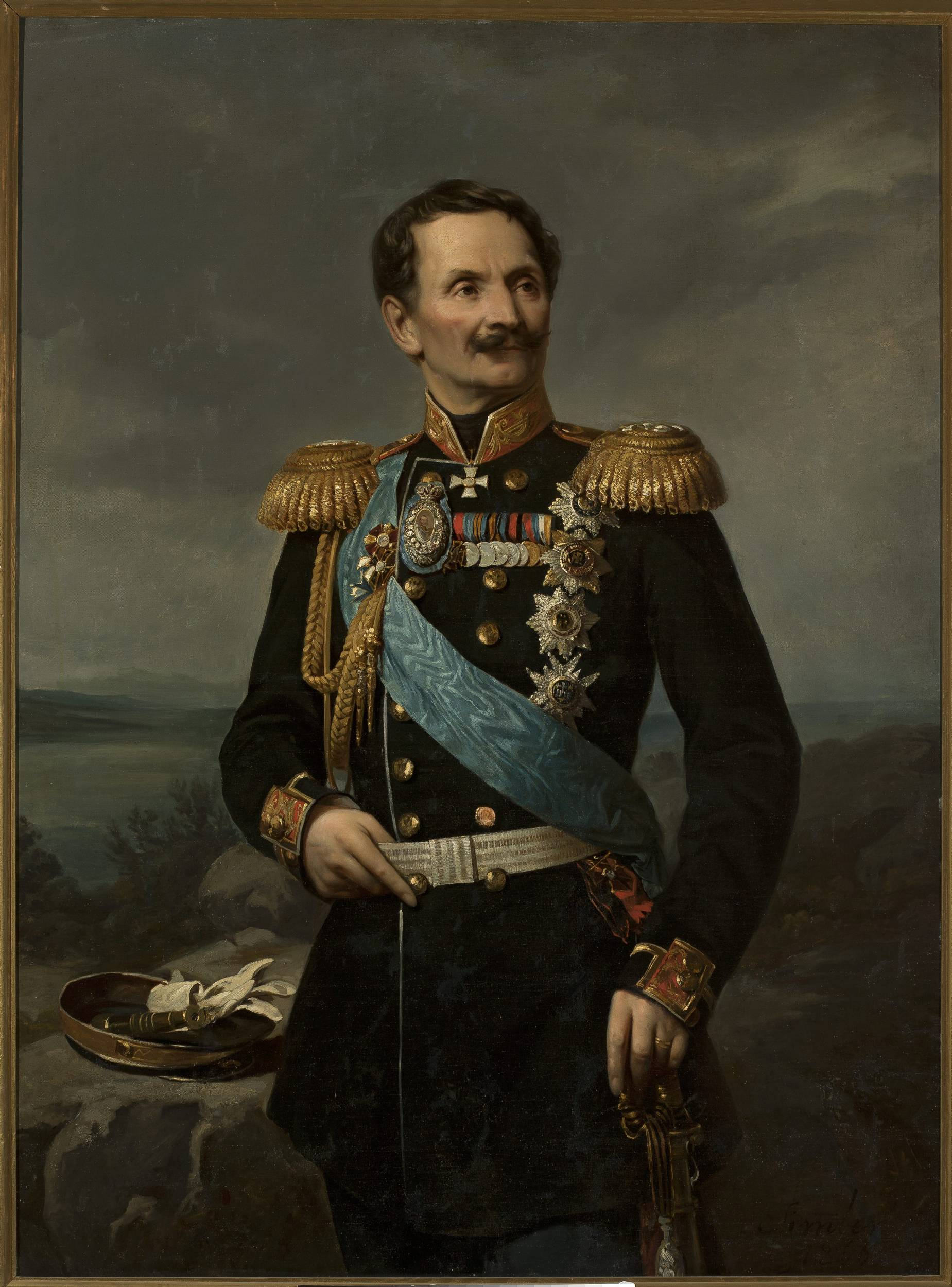
- Portrait by Jan Michał Strzałecki, 1867

Governor-General of Finland
- In office 1855 – 20 November [O.S. 8 November] 1861
- Monarchs: Nicholas I Alexander II
- Preceded by: Alexander Menshikov
- Succeeded by: Platon Rokassovsky

Viceroy of the Kingdom of Poland
- In office 31 October [O.S. 19 October] 1863 – 18 January [O.S. 6 January] 1874
- Monarch: Alexander II
- Preceded by: Grand Duke Konstantin Nikolaevich
- Succeeded by: Position abolished (Paul Demetrius von Kotzebue as the Governor-General of Warsaw)

Personal details
- Born: 26 May [O.S. 15 May] 1794 Sagnitz Manor, Sagnitz, Kreis Dorpat, Riga Governorate, Russian Empire (in present-day Sangaste, Otepää Parish, Valga County, Estonia)
- Died: 18 January [O.S. 6 January] 1874 (aged 79) St. Petersburg, Russian Empire
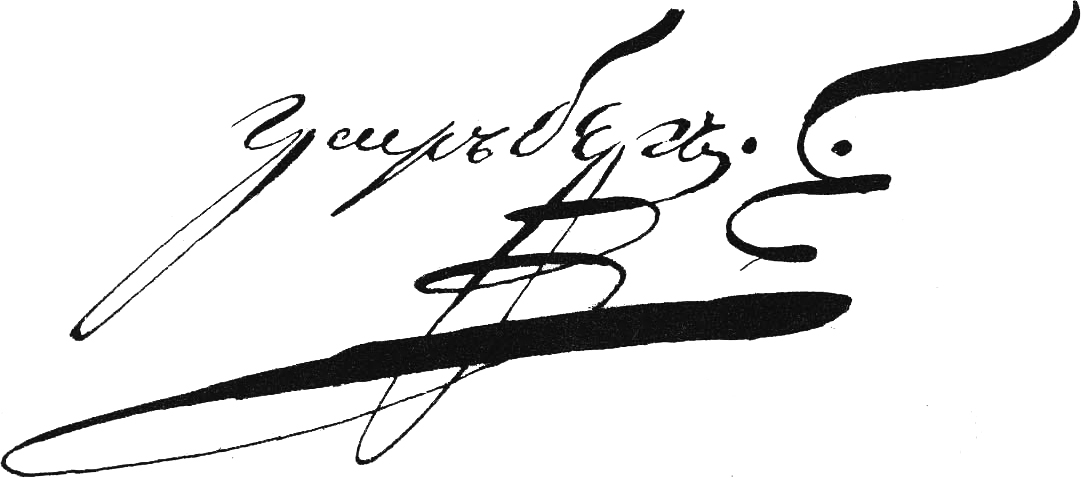
- Signature

Military service
- Allegiance: Russian Empire
- Branch/service: Imperial Russian Army
- Years of service: 1812–1874
- Rank: General-Field Marshal
- Battles/wars: See battles: Napoleonic Wars; French invasion of Russia; War of the Sixth Coalition; Battle of Leipzig; Russo-Turkish War (1828–1829); Battle of Adrianople; November Uprising; Battle of Nur; Battle of Ostrołęka; Battle of Warsaw; Crimean War; Baltic theatre; January Uprising

Friedrich Wilhelm Rembert Graf von Berg (Russian: Фёдор Фёдорович Берг, romanized: Fyodor Fyodorovich Berg; 26 May [O.S. 15 May] 1794 – 18 January [O.S. 6 January] 1874) was a Russian nobleman, statesman, diplomat and general of Baltic German descent. Berg was a count of the Austrian Empire and Grand Duchy of Finland. He was also the fifth-to-last person promoted to the rank of general-field marshal in the history of the Russian Empire. He served as the governor-general of Finland from 1855 to 1861 and as the last viceroy of the Kingdom of Poland from 1863 to 1874.

Berg is most notable for his roles as the governor-general of Finland and viceroy of Poland. During the closing phase of the Crimean War he organised the defence of the principal cities of Finland, and he later played a crucial role in suppressing the 1863 January Uprising by Congress Poland; during the uprising, the Poles carried out numerous unsuccessful assassination attempts on him, which led martial law to be consequently declared in Poland. Berg was also credited with improving the economy and industry of Finland and Poland during his time as viceroy. As a Baltic German, Berg was not enthusiastic about the Russification policies pursued in Poland, opposed the Russian ideology of Pan-Slavism and remained sympathetic to the policies of the German Confederation. Outside of his military career, Berg was also a topographer and geodesist, being one of the founding members of the Russian Geographical Society. He died in St. Petersburg in 1874 and was buried in his family estate in Korten, Livonia (in now Pilskalns, Latvia).

== Biography ==
=== Origin ===
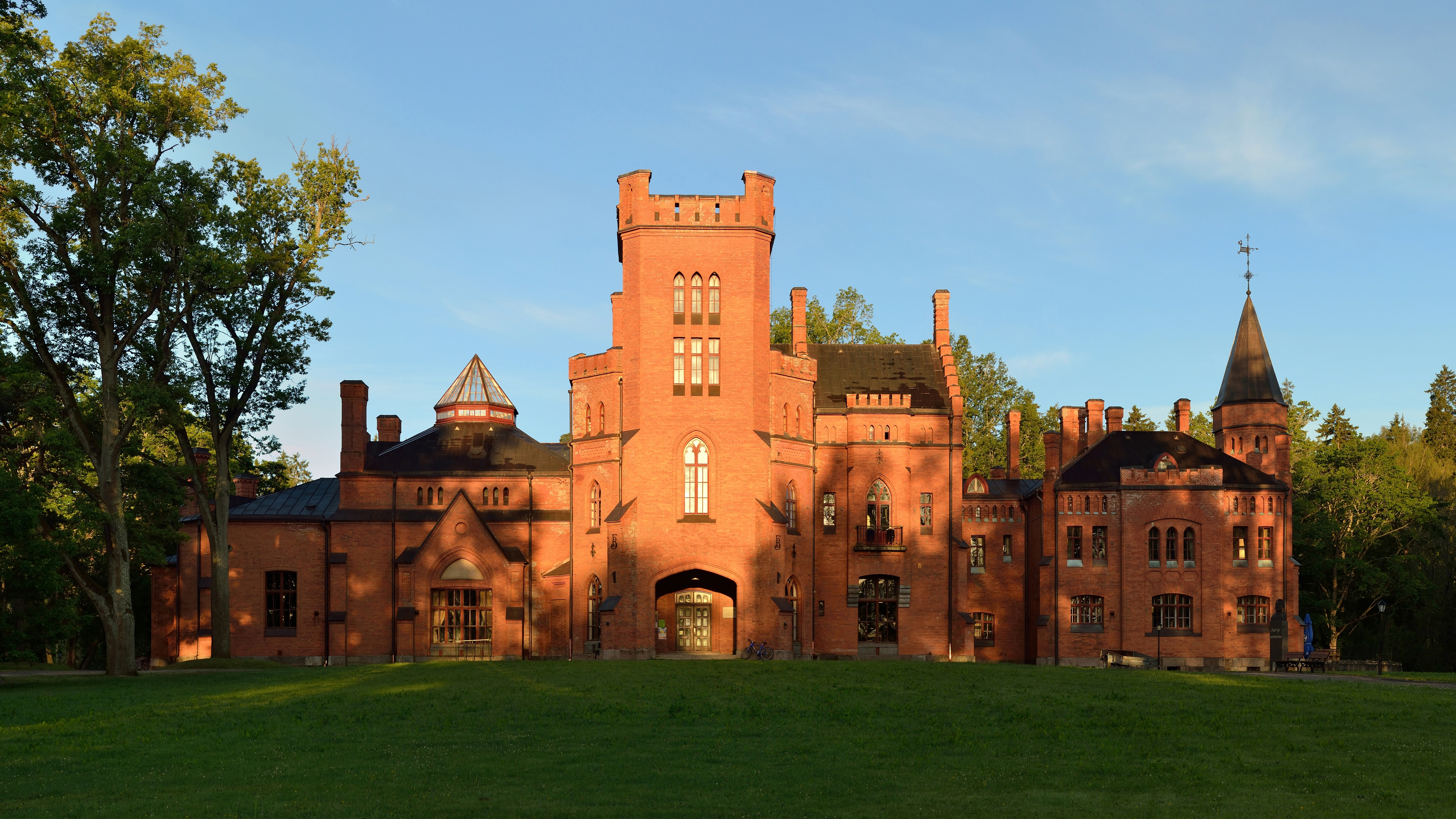
The Sangaste manor, where Count von Berg and his siblings spent their childhood. The current Neo-Gothic building was built after Count von Berg's death by his nephew Friedrich Berg.

Friedrich Wilhelm Rembert von Berg was born on 26 May [O.S. 15 May] 1794, in the family estate in the small village of Sagnitz, in the Kreis Dorpat of the Governorate of Livonia. His father Friedrich Georg von Berg (1763–1811) was a state councillor and his mother Gertruda Wilhelmine von Ermes (1774–1844) was a young noblewoman, the younger Friedrich was the first cousin once removed (Note: Gregor and Burchard Magnus von Berg were the children of Magnus Johann von Berg, while Magnus Johann was the brother of Gotthard Ernst who was the grandfather of Friedrich Wilhelm Rembert) of generals Gregor (1765–1838) and Burchard Magnus von Berg (1764–1838), both of whom served in the Russian Imperial Army during the course of the Napoleonic Wars. Genealogists still debate where the Livonian noble Berg family originated in, many speculated they originated in Westphalia. The first known ancestor of the family to appear in Livonia was Otto von Berg. His son, who was also named Otto, was a vassal of the Livonian Knighthood.

Friedrich belonged to the Sagnitz branch of the Luist line of the family. The Luist line was formed by Captain Gustav von Berg (1656–1715), and the further divided Sagnitz branch was formed by Friedrich's grandfather Major Gotthard Ernst von Berg (1714–1766).

=== Early life ===
Berg along with his siblings spent their childhood in the Sagnitz castle and were home educated by the young Friedrich Georg Wilhelm Struve. He was brought up as a Lutheran. After he finished his home education he studied in the Tartu Gymnasium in Dorpat. Originally not seeking a military career as a family tradition, Berg enrolled into the Philosophy faculty of Imperial University of Dorpat in 1810. But after Napoleon invaded Russia in 1812, Berg dropped out of university and voluntarily entered the Russian Imperial Army. He entered the army as a Fahnenjunker and was enlisted into the 6th Libau Infantry Regiment which was stationed at the north-western part of Russia to defend against Napoleon. Berg's bravery during the war of 1812 rewarded him the rank of lieutenant from Alexander I personally. He was also appointed second to the quartermaster due to his high education and being multilingual among Russian soldiers at the time.

After Napoleon was pushed out of Russia, Berg was transferred to a partisan unit under the command of Baron von Tettenborn and Pavel Kutuzov and took part in actions in Germany including the Battle of Leipzig.

=== Family ===
Berg was born the eldest son of a family with three siblings, including his younger brother Gustav "Astaf" Gotthard Karl von Berg, owner of the Alt-Ottenhof Manor. His other brother Alexander was a diplomat and consul in Naples and London. Count von Berg married late in his life. In 1839, after a long relationship with the Baroness de Sassè, he married a rich Milanese aristocrat Leopoldina Cicogna-Mozzoni (1786–1874), the widow of the Italian politician Alessandro Annoni, with whom he had no children. However, after his brother Gustav's death in 1861, Friedrich adopted his orphaned nephews and brought them under his care:

- Friedrich Georg Magnus Graf von Berg (1845–1938)
- Alexander Rembert Joachim Graf von Berg (1847–1893)
- Georg Erich Rembert Graf von Berg (1849–1920)
- Emilie Wilhelmine "Minni" Anna Marie Ulrike Pauline Gräfin von Berg (1852–1945)

Since his marriage was childless, his Austrian and Finnish comital titles were inherited by his nephews/adoptive children.

== Governor-General of Finland ==
In January 1855, Berg was appointed acting governor-general of the Grand Duchy of Finland, succeeding Alexander Menshikov, and was confirmed in the post in March the same year. Unlike his predecessors, who had resided in Saint Petersburg, Berg took up residence in Helsinki. While Finns initially welcomed this as a sign of greater attention to the grand duchy, they soon found that an active governor-general on the spot also involved himself in minor matters previously handled locally.

During the closing phase of the Crimean War, Berg concentrated the available troops for the defence of the three largest cities of Finland — Helsinki, Turku and Viipuri. The successful defence of the capital had political as well as military significance, since a defeat could have swung Finnish opinion in favour of Scandinavism and the Western powers.

After the war, Berg's tenure coincided with the reformist atmosphere of the early reign of Alexander II, and he actively promoted economic reform. He chaired a committee on communications in 1856 and convened a committee on industry and mining whose survey of Finnish economic conditions laid the groundwork for subsequent reforms. Berg also took cautious steps to strengthen the position of the Finnish language alongside Swedish: an official Finnish-language newspaper, Suomen Julkisia Sanomia, began publication in 1857 with Senate support; an 1858 decree required parish meeting minutes to be kept, as a rule, in the language of local church services; and students were permitted to use Finnish in academic dissertations.

At the same time, Berg's campaign against Scandinavism and his strict censorship made him particularly unpopular with students at the Imperial Alexander University. Convinced that the university fostered liberal cliques and political conspiracies, he had several activist students expelled and in 1857 proposed that the university be broken up into separate faculty-based colleges located in different cities. He also clashed with Finnish officials: conservatives rejected his plans for economic reform, liberals accused him of economic conservatism, and Finnish nationalists doubted his commitment to the Finnish cause.

On the question of convening the Diet of Finland, Berg enforced strict press censorship, believing he could better persuade the emperor to call the diet if the matter was not debated publicly. The establishment of a second committee for Finnish affairs in 1857 was arranged without his knowledge by Minister-Secretary of State Alexander Armfelt and his deputy Emil Stjernvall-Walleen. The committee of estates set up in 1859 to prepare the ground for the diet was likewise formed without his involvement. Berg's conflict with Armfelt deepened, and the question of the so-called January Committee became the final breaking point: his demand that the emperor annul the decision to convene the committee was rejected. Berg submitted his resignation, citing health reasons, in November 1861 and it was accepted.

== Viceroy of Poland ==
Following the outbreak of the January Uprising, Berg was appointed deputy to the viceroy of Congress Poland in March 1863 and played a central role in suppressing the revolt. When Grand Duke Konstantin Nikolaevich resigned as viceroy in the autumn of 1863 after failing to contain the uprising, Berg succeeded him in October of that year. He remained in the post until his death in 1874.

== Honours and awards ==
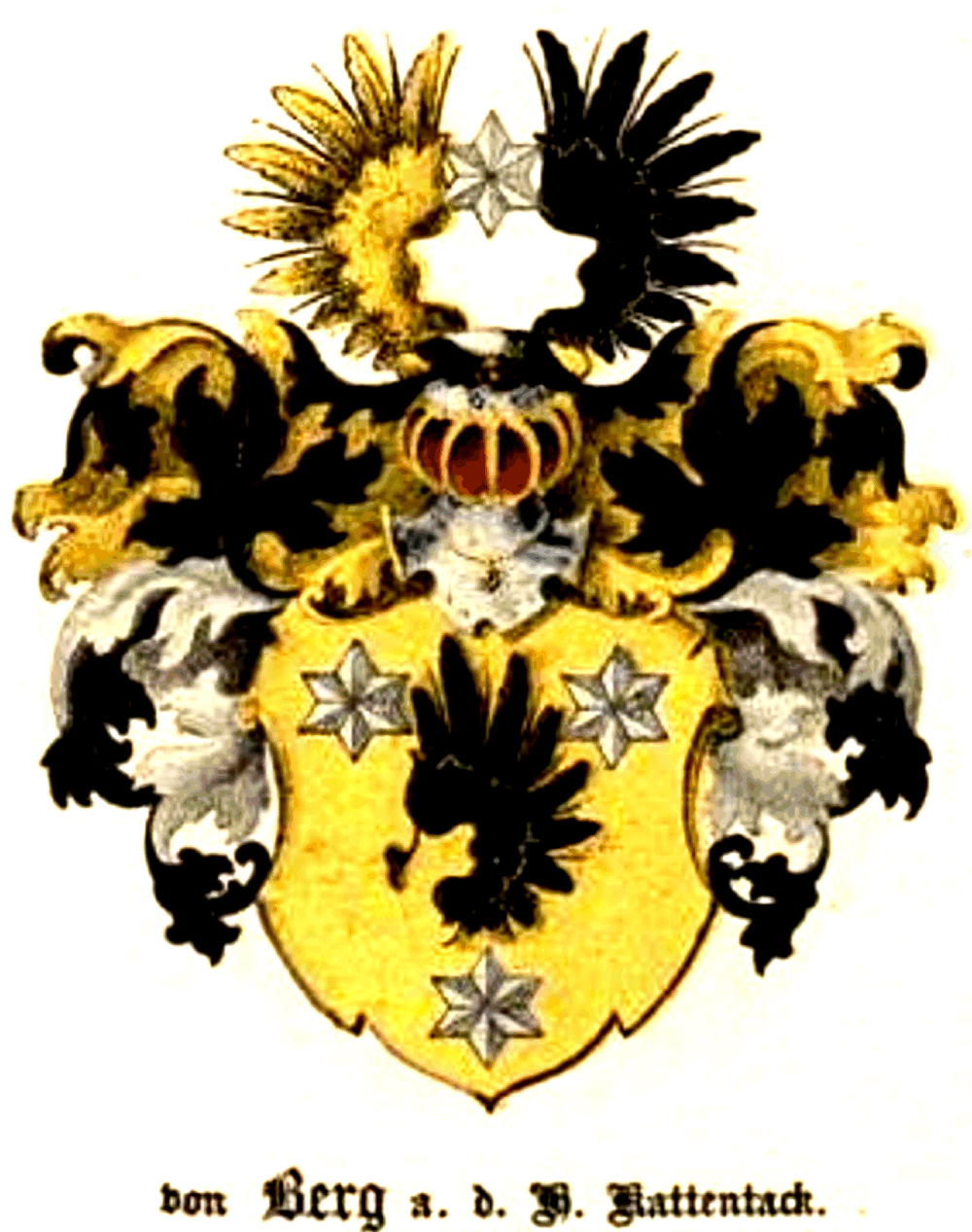
Coat of arms of the Berg family, which belonged to the Uradel, in the Baltic Coat of arms book by Carl Arvid von Klingspor in 1882.

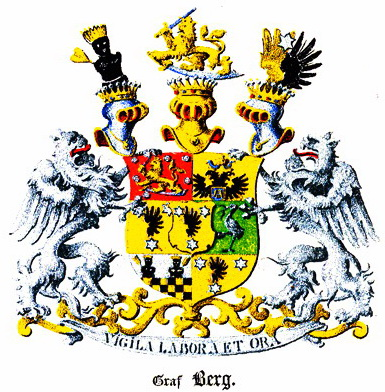
Coat of arms of the counts of the family of 1856, in the Baltic Coat of arms book by Carl Arvid Klingspor in 1882.

=== Russian ===
- Order of St. Anna, 3rd class (1813)
- Order of St. Vladimir, 4th class with a bow (1813)
- Order of Saint Anna, 1st class with the Imperial Crown (1828, Imperial Crown in 1831)
- Order of St. George, 3rd class (25.6.1829)
- Order of St. Vladimir, 2nd class (1829)
- Order of Virtuti Militari, Commander's Cross for military distinction (1831)
- Order of the White Eagle (1833)
- Order of St. Alexander Nevsky (1838, diamonds signs in 1845)
- Order of St. Vladimir, 1st class (1848)
- Gold Sword for Bravery with diamonds and the inscription "For a campaign to Hungary in 1849"
- Order of St. Andrew with swords and diamond signs (7.08.1855, diamond signs in 11.8.1861)

=== Foreign ===
- Kingdom of Prussia:
  - Pour le Mérite with the Golden Crown (1813, Golden Crown in 1864)
  - Order of the Red Eagle, 1st class (1835)
  - Order of the Black Eagle with diamond marks (1845, diamond marks in 1865)
- Kingdom of the Netherlands:
  - Order of the Netherlands Lion, Great Cross (1849)
- Kingdom of Hungary:
  - Order of St. Stephen of Hungary, Nagykereszt (1849)
- Kingdom of Sweden:
  - Order of the Seraphim with diamond marks (1859, diamonds marks on 17.8.1860)
- Kingdom of Greece:
  - Order of the Redeemer, Great Cross (1868)

== Publications ==
- Le feldmaréchal-comte Berg, namiestnik dans le royaume de Pologne. Notice biographique. Warsaw 1872 – Autobiography

== Citations ==
=== Works cited ===
- Stackelberg, Otto Magnus (1930). "Genealogische Handbuch der baltischen Ritterschaften, Teil Estland, Band I, Seite 654-662 (Genealogical Handbook of the Baltic Knighthood, Part Estonia, Volume I, page 654-662)". personen.digitale-sammlungen.de (in German). Starke Verlag, Görlitz.
- Klingspor, Carl Arvid (1882). "Baltisches Wappenbuch Wappen sämmtlicher, den Ritterschaften von Livland, Estland, Kurland und Oesel zugehörigen Adelsgeschlechter, Seite 10 (The coat of arms of the coat of arms is the coat of arms belonging to the knighthoods of Livonia, Estonia, Courland and Oesel, page 10)". personen.digitale-sammlungen.de (in German). Stockholm.
- "Deutschbaltisches Biographisches Lexikon, Seite 49-52 (Baltic German Biographical Dictionary, page 49-52)". bbld.de (in German). Buchhandlung v. Hirschheydt, Wedemark. 1998.
- "Военная энциклопедия, страница 478 (Military Encyclopaedia, page 478)". ru.m.wikisource.org (in Russian). Sytin, Moscow. 1911–1915.
- Stolberg-Wernigerode, Otto zu (1955). "Neue deutsche Biographie, Band: 2, Behaim - Bürkel, seite 73-74 (New German Biography, Volume: 2, page 73-74)". daten.digitale-sammlungen.de (in German). Duncker & Humblot, Berlin.

== General sources ==
- "Берг, Федор Федорович" . Brockhaus and Efron Encyclopedic Dictionary (in Russian). 1906.
- Soloviev, Boris Ivanovich (2000). "Генерал-фельдмаршалы России (General-Field Marshals of Russia". hrono.ru (in Russian). Phoenix, Rostov-on-Don.
- Dick, Wolfgang R. (1996). "Die Dorpater Struves und der Generalfeldmarschall Friedrich Wilhelm Rembert Berg. In: Jahrbuch der Akademischen Gesellschaft für deutschbaltische Kultur in Tartu (Dorpat). Band 1. Seite 61-66 (The Dorpater Struves and the General-Field Marshal Friedrich Wilhelm Rembert Berg. In: Yearbook of the Academic Society for Baltic-German Culture in Tartu (Dorpat). Volume 1. Page 61-66)". researchgate.net (in German). Tartu.

Political offices
Preceded by Alexander Menshikov	Governor-General of Finland; 1855–1861	Succeeded by Platon Rokassovsky
Preceded by Grand Duke Konstantin Nikolaevich	Viceroy of Poland; 1863–1874	Succeeded by Paul Demetrius von Kotzebue as Governor-General of Warsaw
