= A with ogonek (Cyrillic) =

Cyrillic letter formerly used in Polish and Lithuanian

- А̨ а̨

Usage
- Writing system: Cyrillic
- Type: Alphabetic

A with ogonek (А̨ а̨; italics: А̨ а̨; sound: [ã, ɑ̃]) is a letter of the Cyrillic alphabet used in the Lithuanian Cyrillic alphabet and Polish Cyrillic alphabet, used after the failed January Uprising and a subsequent ban on the Latin script until 1904.

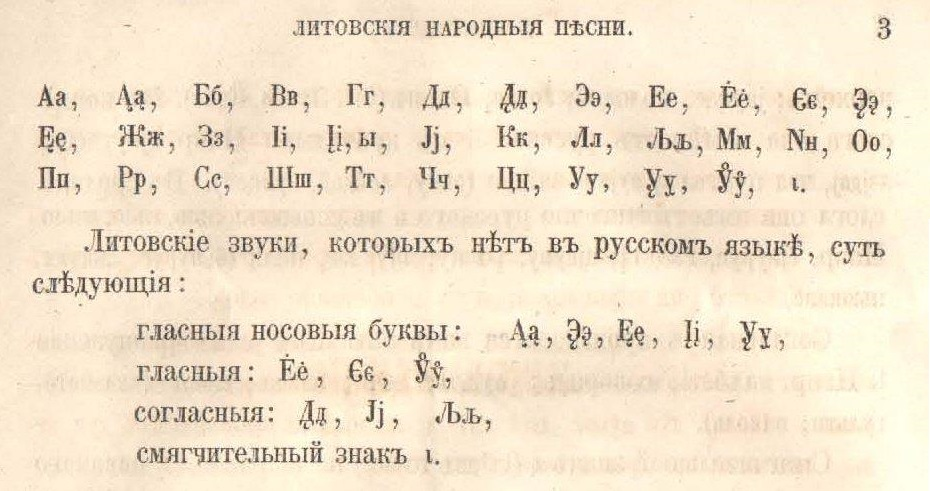
1867 Lithuanian Cyrillic alphabet by Juška

== Computing codes ==
Form	Appearance	Components		Code
Majuscule	А̨	U+0410; А	U+0328 ◌̨	U+0410; U+0328
Minuscule	а̨	U+0430 а	U+0328 ◌̨	U+0430; U+0328
