= List of royal consorts of Partitioned Poland =

This list concerns consorts of Partitioned Poland, from 1795 and 19th and early 20th century. For the historical royal consorts of Poland until 1795, see List of Polish royal consorts.

== Consort of the Duchy of Warsaw ==
Picture	Name	Father	Birth	Marriage	Became Consort	Coronation as Duchess	Ceased to be Consort	Death	Spouse
	Amalie of Zweibrücken-Birkenfeld	Frederick Michael, Count Palatine of Zweibrücken (Palatinate-Birkenfeld)	10 May 1752	29 January 1769	13 June 1807; Duchy of Warsaw established	Never crowned	January 1813; Duchy of Warsaw destroyed	15 November 1828	Frederick Augustus I

== After the Partition of Poland ==
Picture	Name	Spouse	Dynasty	Reign as consort	Notes
=== Kingdom of Galicia and Lodomeria (Austrian Poland) ===
	Maria Luisa of Spain	Leopold II	Bourbon	1790–1792	the Austrian portion obtained in the first partition of Poland
	Maria Theresa of Naples	Francis II	Bourbon-Two Sicilies	1792–1807	
	Maria Ludovika of Austria-Este	Francis II	Austria-Este	1808–1816	
	Caroline Augusta of Bavaria	Francis II	Wittelsbach	1816–1835	
	Maria Anna of Sardinia	Ferdinand	Savoy	1835–1848	
	Elisabeth of Bavaria	Francis Joseph	Wittelsbach	1854–1898	
	Zita of Bourbon-Parma	Charles	Bourbon-Parma	1916–1918	
=== Congress Kingdom of Poland (Russian Poland) ===
	Louise of Baden	Alexander I	Baden	1815–1825	created at the Congress of Vienna and therefore dubbed "Congress Poland"
	Charlotte of Prussia	Nicholas I	Hohenzollern	1825–1855	husband deposed by Sejm during uprising of 1831, autonomy abolished in 1832
	Marie of Hesse and by Rhine	Alexander II	Hesse	1855–1880	annexed into Russia after uprising in 1863
	Dagmar of Denmark	Alexander III	Schleswig-Holstein-Sonderburg-Glücksburg	1881–1894	
	Alix of Hesse and by Rhine	Nicholas II	Hesse	1894–1917	abdicated
=== Grand Duchy of Poznań (Prussian Poland) ===
	Elisabeth Ludovika of Bavaria	Frederick William IV	Wittelsbach	1840–1861	created at the Congress of Vienna. Autonomy abolished in 1849
	Augusta of Saxe-Weimar-Eisenach	William I	Saxe-Weimar-Eisenach	1861–1888	
	Victoria of the United Kingdom	Frederick III	Saxe-Coburg-Gotha	1888	
	Augusta Viktoria of Schleswig-Holstein	William II	Schleswig-Holstein-Sonderburg-Augustenburg	1888–1918	

== See also ==
- List of rulers of Partitioned Poland
