= Organic Statute of the Kingdom of Poland =

1832 statute

The Organic Statute of the Kingdom of Poland (Polish: Statut Organiczny dla Królestwa Polskiego) was a statute which replaced the Constitution of 1815 in the aftermath of the failed November Uprising in the Russian Partition of Poland. The Statute was pronounced in occupied Warsaw on March 13/25, 1832 by Marshal Ivan Fyodorovich Paskevich, appointed Namiestnik of the Kingdom of Poland. To commemorate the Tsar's crushing of the Cadet Revolution, Alexander Pushkin wrote "On the Taking of Warsaw", hailing the capitulation of Poland's capital as the "final triumph" of Mother Russia. Other writers joined in to celebrate.

The Statute, signed by Emperor Nicholas I, replaced the personal union between the Kingdom of Poland and the Russian Empire with the "eternal incorporation" of Poland into Russia (a point that had been stated in the first article of the 1815 Constitution). The Parliament (Polish: Sejm) of the Kingdom was abolished, and its army merged with the Russian Army.

Remaining resemblances of autonomy left without change by the Statute included the Council of State, the Administrative Council, and the Bank of Poland. Out of five governmental commissions, two (military and religious/educational) were dissolved (leaving only treasury, justice and internal affairs). The power of the Namiestnik of Poland was increased.
