= Army of Congress Poland =

1815–1831 Polish military

- Wojsko Polskie Królestwa Kongresowego
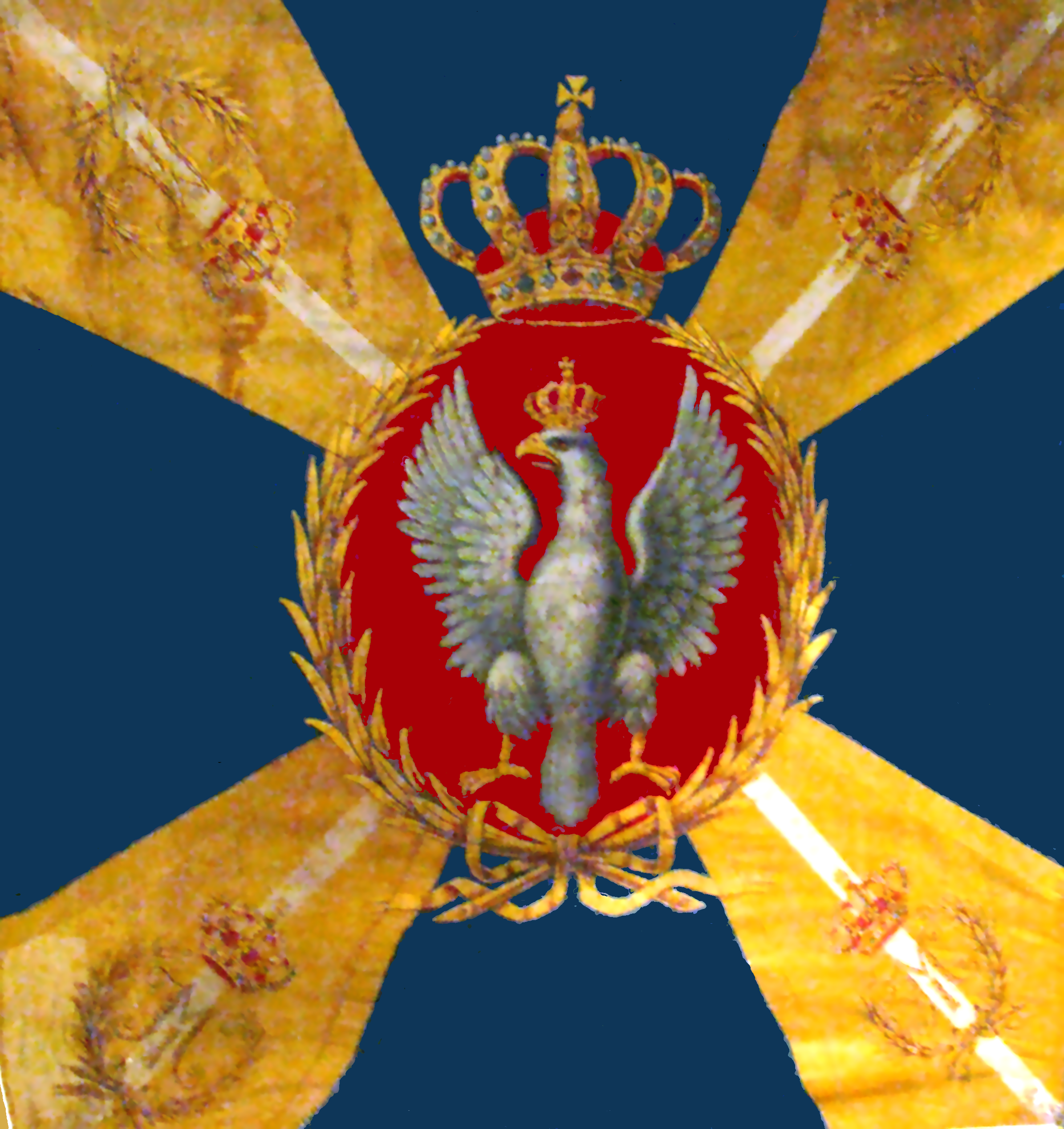
- Standard of the 1st Jaeger Regiment
- Active: 1815-1831
- Country: Congress Poland
- Allegiance: Russian Empire
- Role: Armed forces of Congress Poland

The Army of Congress Poland (Polish: Wojsko Polskie Królestwa Kongresowego, Russian: Армия Царства Польского) refers to the military forces of the Kingdom of Poland that existed in the period 1815–1831.

== History ==
The army was formed even before the Congress Poland, in 1814, and was based on the Army of the Duchy of Warsaw. Its creation was confirmed by the Constitution of the Congress Kingdom. It took part in the November Uprising against the Russians. The uprising begun when a group of young officers tried, unsuccessfully, to assassinate Grand Duke Constantine. The defeat of the uprising in 1831 marked the end of the existence of a regular Polish army for almost a century. It was abolished with the new constitution of 1832, the Organic Statute of the Kingdom of Poland, which incorporated the army into the Imperial Russian Army.

== Culture and training ==
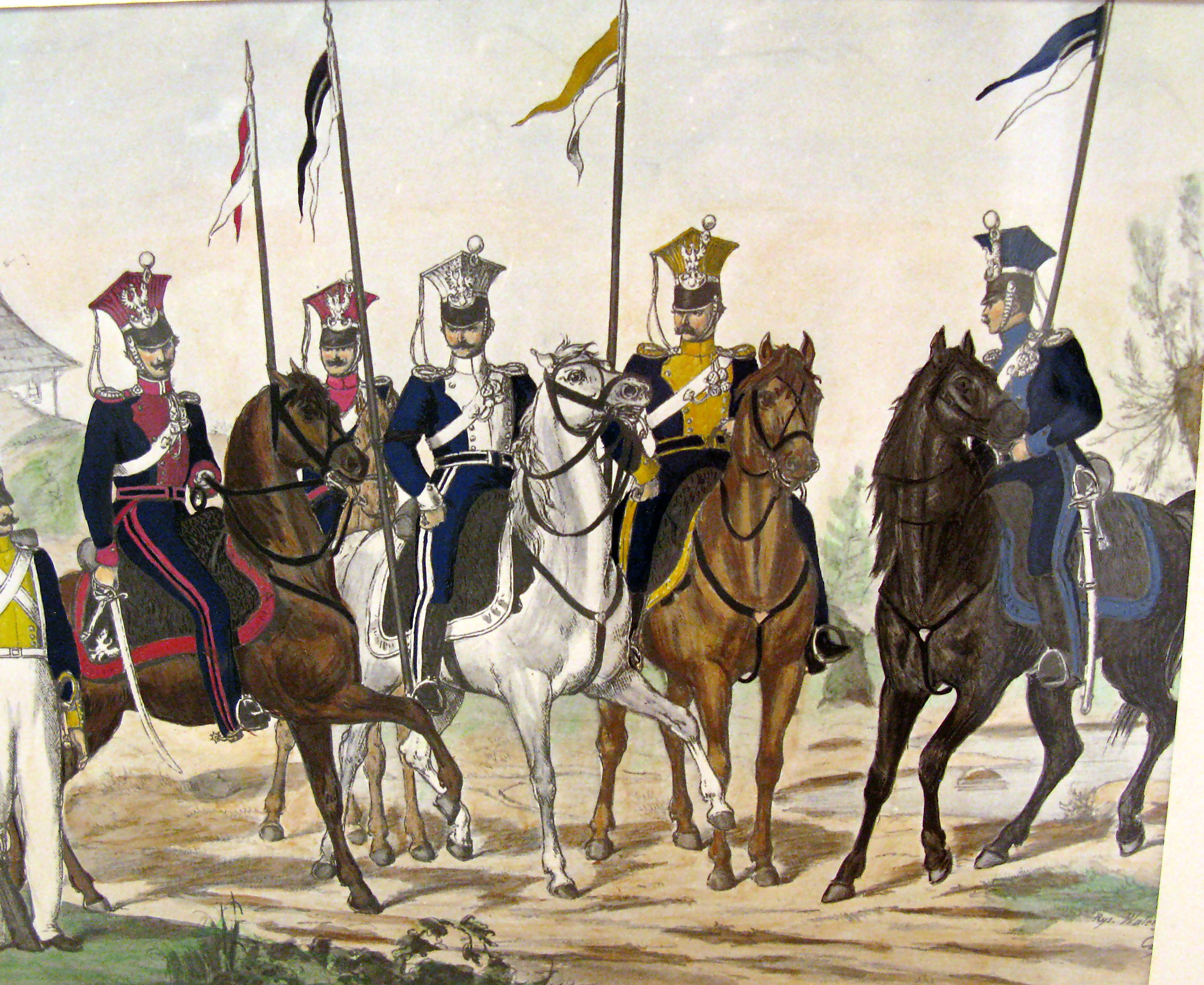
Polish cavalry (uhlans) during the November Uprising

The Army retained Polish uniforms. It was reorganized into a Russian army model, with infantry and cavalry divisions, artillery brigades and batteries, and an engineering corps. A regiment of grenadiers and cavalry rifleman were also formed.

Obligatory military service was set at 10 years, with the option of buying one's time out. The Army was well trained, with a new cadet school in Kalisz, a number of podchorąży training schools, and a higher military school in Warsaw.

The cost of maintaining the army was close to 50% of the Kingdom's budget.

== Composition and size ==
Notable Polish commanders of the Army included Ignacy Prądzyński and Józef Bem, and General Jan Henryk Dąbrowski. Its nominal commander-in-chief was the Russian viceroy, Grand Duke Constantine Pavlovich, although for most purposes the Army was commanded by a Military Council.

The peacetime army was 28,000-30,000 strong (sources vary). During the November Uprising, it was expanded to 100,000. Of that, about 57,000 could be seen as a qualified, first-line troops.

Before the Uprising, the Army was composed of two infantry divisions with three brigades each, two cavalry divisions with two brigades each, and two artillery brigades (one cavalry and one infantry). Each infantry brigade was about 3,600 strong, each cavalry brigade was about half that size.

== See also ==
- Army of the Duchy of Warsaw
- Military of the Polish-Lithuanian Commonwealth
- Polish Legions (Napoleonic period)
