= Administrative Council =

Administrative Council (Polish: Rada Administracyjna) was a part of Council of State of the Congress Poland. Introduced by the Constitution of the Kingdom of Poland in 1815, it was composed of 5 ministers, special nominees of the King and the Namestnik of the Kingdom of Poland. The Council executed King's will, ruled in the cases outside the ministers competence and prepared projects for the Council of State.

The Council decided to revolt during the November Uprising in 1830 against Tsar Nicholas I, and transformed itself into governing Executive Commission.

The council was reformed after the death of namestnik Józef Zajączek in 1826, after the fall of November Uprising in 1831, after the liquidation of Council of State in 1841, after the reforms of Aleksander Wielopolski in 1863 and after the fall of January Uprising. It was liquidated on 15 June 1867.

The council was reformed:

- after the death of namestnik Józef Zajączek in 1826
- after the fall of the November Uprising in 1831
- after the liquidation of the Council of State in 1841
- after the reforms of Aleksander Wielopolski in 1863
- after the fall of the January Uprising
