= Namiestnik of Poland =

Russian official in Poland (1815–1915)

- Coat of arms of Poland

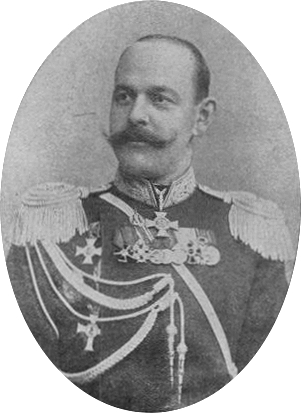
- Last holder Pavel Yengalychev
- Residence: Namiestnik's Palace
- Appointer: Emperor of Russia
- Formation: 1815
- First holder: Józef Zajączek
- Final holder: Pavel Yengalychev
- Abolished: 1915

The Namiestnik (or Namestnik, Viceroy) of the Kingdom of Poland (Polish: namiestnik Królestwa Polskiego; Russian: наместник Царства Польского) was the deputy of the Emperor of Russia who, under the Congress Kingdom of Poland (1815–1915), was styled "King of Poland". Between 1874 and 1914, the title Namiestnik was replaced by that of Governor-General of Warsaw (Polish: generał-gubernator warszawski).^{[a]}

== History ==
The office of Namiestnik was introduced in Poland by the Constitution of Congress Poland (1815), in its Article 3 (On the Namiestnik and Council of State). The namiestnik was chosen by the Tsar from among the noble citizens of the Russian Empire or the Kingdom of Poland, excluding naturalized citizens. The namiestnik supervised the entire public administration and, in the monarch's absence, chaired the Council of State of Congress Poland, as well as the Administrative Council of Congress Poland. He could veto the councils' decisions; other than that, his decisions had to be countersigned by the appropriate government minister. The namiestnik exercised broad powers and could nominate candidates for most senior government posts (ministers, senators, judges of the High Tribunal, councilors of state, referendaries, as well as bishops and archbishops). Following the 1830-31 Polish Uprising, also known as the November Uprising, the Administrative Council of Congress Poland was abolished as Congress Poland came under a new Russian military occupation.

The namiestnik had no competence in the realms of finances and foreign policy; his military competence varied.^{[b]} In the event that the namiestnik were unable to exercise his office due to resignation or death, this function would be temporarily carried out by the president of the Council of State.

The office of namiestnik was never officially abolished; however, the last namiestnik was Friedrich Wilhelm Rembert von Berg, who served from 1863 to his death in 1874. No namiestnik was named to replace him; however, the role of namiestnik—viceroy of the former Congress Kingdom—passed to the Governor-General of Warsaw. However, in the internal correspondence of Russian Imperial offices this functionary was still called namiestnik.

The governor-general answered directly to the Tsar and exercised much broader powers than had the namiestnik. In particular, he controlled all the military forces in the region and oversaw the judicial systems (he could impose death sentences without trial). He could also issue "declarations with the force of law," which could alter existing laws.

== Viceroys of the Kingdom of Poland ==
- 27 November 1815 – 28 June 1826 Prince Józef Zajączek
- 1826 – 1830 Count Walenty Faustyn Sobolewski (chairman of the Administrative Council), Grand Duke Konstantin Pavlovich of Russia (commander-in-chief of the Polish Army)
- 1831 – 29 May 1831 Graf Hans Karl von Diebitsch, commander of the Imperial Russian occupational forces
- 21 March 1831 – 20 January 1856 Serene Prince Ivan Paskevich
  - 1849 Johan Jakob von Daehn, acting
  - 1853 – 1855 Graf Friedrich von Rüdiger, acting
  - 1856 Count Wincenty Krasiński, acting
- 8 January 1856 – 18 May 1861 Prince Mikhail Gorchakov
- 16 May 1861 – 6 August 1861 Nikolai Sukhozanet, acting
- 6 August 1861 – 9 October 1861 Count Karl Lambert, acting
- 9 October 1861 – 27 May 1862 Count Alexander von Lüders, acting
- 27 May 1862 – 19 October 1863 Grand Duke Konstantin Nikolayevich of Russia
- 19 October 1863 – 6 January 1874 Graf Friedrich Wilhelm Rembert von Berg (former Governor-General of Finland)

== Governors-General of Warsaw ==
- Count Paul Demetrius von Kotzebue (1874–80)
- Pyotr Pavlovich Albedinsky (1880–83)
- Joseph Vladimirovich Gourko (1883–94)
- Pavel Andreyevich Shuvalov (1894–1896)
- Prince Alexander Imeretinsky (1896–1900)
- Mikhail Chertkov (1900–05)
- Konstantin Maximovich (1905)
- Georgi Skalon (1905–14)
- Yakov Zhilinskiy (1914)
- Pavel Yengalychev (1914–1915)

== See also ==
- Guberniya
- Ambassadors and envoys from Russia to Poland (1763–1794)
- Governor-General of Finland
- Governor-General of Lithuania/Governor-General of Vilnius/Governor-General of Wilno
- Namiestnik's Palace (today, Presidential Palace, Warsaw)

== Notes ==
a The office is referred to in sources by various names. Namiestnik is sometimes translated as "viceroy," "regent" or "lord lieutenant," and even "Prince" of Poland or Prince of Warsaw. The Governor-General of Warsaw is sometimes referred to as "Governor-General of the Kingdom of Poland" or "Governor-General of Poland." Some sources erroneously apply the term namiestnik to the period after 1874, or "governor-general" to the earlier period.

b Sources are contradictory as to whether the namiestnik had competence in the military realm. Certainly from 1815 to 1831 the Congress Kingdom's military was controlled by Grand Duke Constantine Pavlovich of Russia, who de facto had more power than the namiestnik, Józef Zajączek. Zajączek died in 1826 and was not replaced until 1831, when the November 1831 Uprising saw Ivan Paskevich assume the post of namiestnik—as well as command of Russian military forces in the region, as he was tasked with defeating the Uprising. The question of who controlled the military after Paskevich's death is unclear, but again the last namiestnik, Fyodor Berg, was tasked with crushing another Polish uprising—the January 1863 Uprising—and commanded the military.
