= Council of State (Kingdom of Poland) =

Council of State (Polish: Rada Stanu of Congress Kingdom of Poland) was an important state institution of Poland that existed in the 19th century. It was also known as the Council of State of Kingdom of Poland (Rada Stanu Królestwa Polskiego).

There were three different Councils of State throughout that period in the Kingdom of Poland. The first was created by the Constitution of Kingdom of Poland. The constitution divided the Council of State into General Assembly of Council of State (Ogólne Zgromadzenie Rady Stanu) and Administrative Council (Rada Administracyjna). In time the General Assembly became habitually referred to as 'Council of State'. The Council of State was composed of 5 ministers, 9 ordinary councilors and changing numbers of extraordinary councilors (created by the monarch) as well as referendaries of state. The Council could prepare projects of legislation for Sejm and monarch's decrees, put governmental officials on trial for administrative misconduct and act as a court in competency and administration cases. This first Council was dissolved during the November Uprising.

The second Council of State was created by the Organic Statue of the Kingdom of Poland.

The third Council of State was created after the January Uprising. The final abolition of the Council of State in 1867 was the ultimate end of the administrative judicial system based on the French system.

== See also ==
- Namestnik of the Kingdom of Poland
