= Engalychev =

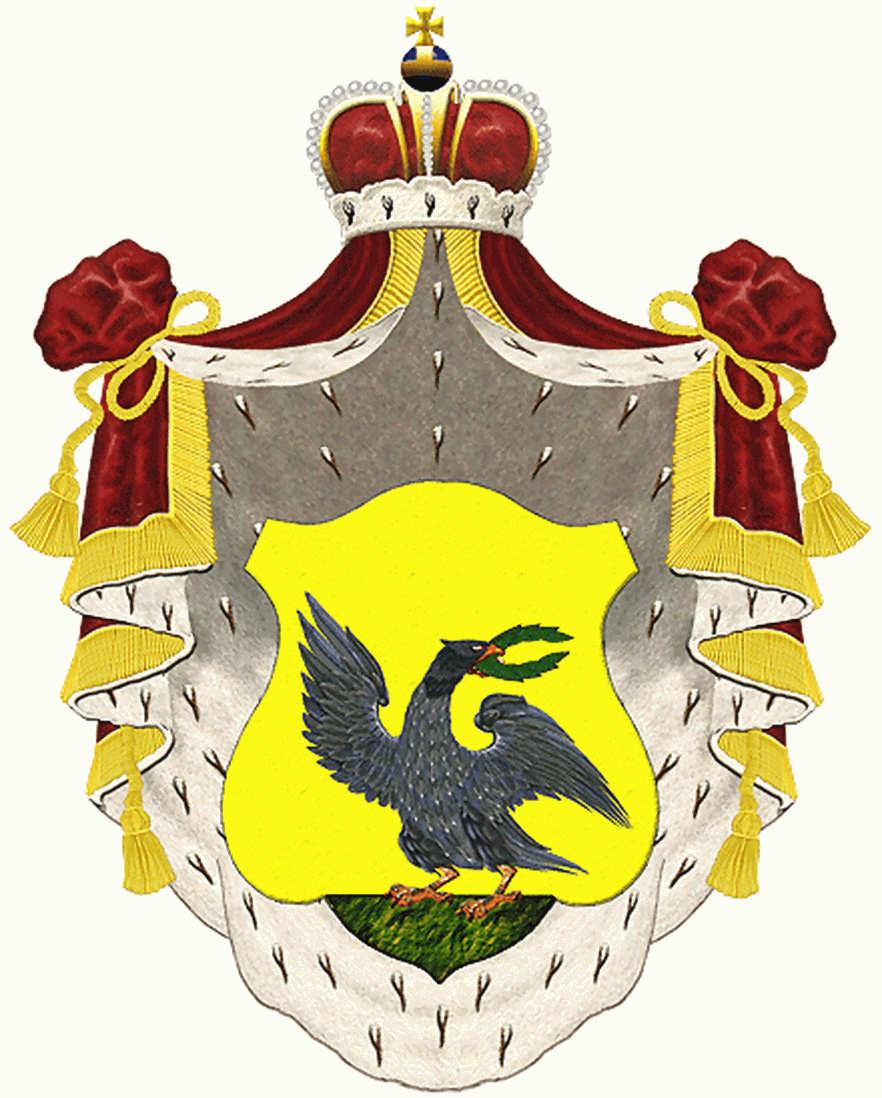
Coat of arms of the Engalychev family

The House of Engalychev, also transliterated Yengalychev, Engalytscheff and Jengalitschev (Almanach de Gotha 1937) (Russian: Енгалычев), is a princely family recognized by the Russian Empire. Its origin is from medieval independent rulers of the tatar, titled "mourzas" (tatar) and mentioned as of tatar origin.

== History ==
Mama or Mamy, prince of the Mordvins (mourza of Tatars of Mordovia), Lord of Kadom and Piandem, is the ancestor if this family. Letters Patent of Tsar Ivan IV, dated 28 March 1580, designate "Ian Galytch" as Prince of the Mordvins of Kadom and Stialdem.

In the 20th and 19th centuries, there were two clearly distinct branches of this house: One branch descends from Ishmamet (Ichmamet) mourza whose princely status is known to have been recognized in 1621. The other branch, holding a property called Bedychevo, and known by the name (Engalychev-Bedychevo sometimes) has a lineage documented since the 15th century when they got the Bedychevo lordship.

This family was, somewhat artificially, grouped in documentation together with Tatar princely families of Russian empire. 19th century members, another Ishmamet (Ichmanet) and Almakai Engalychev are mentioned as princes in land register of the district where they held estates. In 19th centuries, both extant branches received their listing in the official roll of princes, recognition of being kniaz.

In Letters Patent of Peter the Great dated 1723, Semen Isianevich Engalychev is qualified with the title of prince.

The family was listed in the first part of the Registers of the Nobility of Russia that became formal in the 19th century at latest. They are mentioned as Orthodox. Russia confirmed their Arms on 1/13 April 1863.

All members of the house bear the title prince/princess Engalychev.

== Famous members ==
- Pavel Yengalychev (Павел Николаевич Енгалычев) (1864–1944), general
- Nicolas Engalicev (1915-1981), Latvian, Italian and Canadian chess player
- Nicholas Engalitcheff (1874-1935), Russian diplomat

== See also ==
- Yenikeyev
