= List of rulers of Partitioned Poland =

This list concerns the monarchs of Partitioned Poland, from 1795 to the 19th- and early-20th-century claimants to the Polish throne. For the historical monarchs of Poland until 1795, see List of Polish monarchs.

== Kings of the Kingdom of Poland ==
Ruler	Dynasty	Reign began	Reign ended	Notes
Alexander I (Aleksander I)	Holstein-Gottorp-Romanov	9 June 1815	1 December 1825	The Kingdom of Poland created at the Congress of Vienna and therefore dubbed "Congress Poland".
Nicholas I (Mikołaj I)	Holstein-Gottorp-Romanov	1 December 1825	2 March 1855	Deposed by the Polish Parliament (Sejm) on 25 January 1831 during the November Uprising (1830–1831), autonomy abolished in 1832.
Alexander II (Aleksander II)	Holstein-Gottorp-Romanov	2 March 1855	13 March 1881	The Kingdom of Poland annexed into the Russian Empire after the January Uprising (1863–1864), and the name of the kingdom was changed to Vistula Land (1867–1915).
Alexander III (Aleksander III)	Holstein-Gottorp-Romanov	13 March 1881	1 November 1894	
Nicholas II (Mikołaj II)	Holstein-Gottorp-Romanov	1 November 1894	15 March 1917	Abdicated in 1917.

== Kings and queens of Galicia and Lodomeria (Galicja) ==
Ruler	Dynasty	Reign began	Reign ended	Notes
Maria Theresa (Maria Teresa)	Habsburg	22 September 1772	29 November 1780	The area annexed by the Habsburg monarchy in the First Partition of Poland (the Polish-Lithuanian Commonwealth); Empress Maria Theresa of Austria (who was also Queen of Hungary, Queen of Bohemia, etc.) recalled the old Hungarian claims to the Regnum Galiciæ et Lodomeriæ, and Czech claims to the Duchies of Auschwitz and Zator.
Joseph II (Józef II)	Habsburg-Lorraine	29 November 1780	20 February 1790	
Leopold II (Leopold II)	Habsburg-Lorraine	20 February 1790	1 March 1792	
Francis II (Franciszek II)	Habsburg-Lorraine	1 March 1792	2 March 1835	The last Holy Roman Emperor, ruling from 1792 until 6 August 1806, when the Empire was formally dissolved, but continued as Francis I, Emperor of Austria (Kaiser von Österreich).
Ferdinand I (Ferdynand I)	Habsburg-Lorraine	2 March 1835	2 December 1848	After the unsuccessful Cracow Uprising of 1846, the Free City of Cracow was annexed by Austria on 16 November 1846 as the Grand Duchy of Cracow; the full official name of the province was extended to Kingdom of Galicia and Lodomeria, and the Grand Duchy of Cracow with the Duchies of Auschwitz and Zator.
Francis Joseph I (Franciszek Józef I)	Habsburg-Lorraine	2 December 1848	21 November 1916	After the Austro-Hungarian Compromise of 1867, and the reorganization of the Empire as the Dual Monarchy, a broad autonomy was granted to Galicia and Lodomeria within Cisleithania, the Austrian part of Austria-Hungary.
Charles I (Karol I)	Habsburg-Lorraine	21 November 1916	11 November 1918	Renounced all participation in affairs of state but did not abdicate.

== Dukes of Warsaw (Warszawa) ==
Ruler	Dynasty	Reign began	Reign ended	Notes
Frederick Augustus I (Fryderyk August)	Wettin	9 July 1807	22 May 1815	Grandson of Augustus III; King of Saxony 1805–1827; Duchy of Warsaw established by Napoleon in 1807 as a protectorate of the French Empire, dissolved at the Congress of Vienna and divided into the Kingdom of Poland, protectorate of the Russian Empire, and the Grand Duchy of Posen, protectorate of the Kingdom of Prussia.

== Dukes of Danzig (Gdańsk) ==
Ruler	Dynasty	Reign began	Reign ended	Notes
François Joseph Lefebvre (Franciszek Józef Lefebvre)	Lefebvre	9 September 1807	2 January 1814	Free City of Danzig, a semi-independent state established by Napoleon I in 1807, dissolved at the Congress of Vienna and reincorporated into Prussia.

== Grand Dukes of Posen (Poznań) ==
Ruler	Dynasty	Reign began	Reign ended	Notes
Frederick William III (Fryderyk Wilhelm III)	Hohenzollern	9 June 1815	7 June 1840	The Grand Duchy of Posen created at the Congress of Vienna; represented by Duke-Governor Antoni Radziwiłł until 1831.
Frederick William IV (Fryderyk Wilhelm IV)	Hohenzollern	7 June 1840	2 January 1861	Autonomy abolished on June 28, 1848; the Grand Duchy was formally replaced by the Province of Posen in the Prussian constitution of 5 December 1848.
William I (Wilhelm I)	Hohenzollern	2 January 1861	9 March 1888	The Province of Posen, within the Kingdom of Prussia, became a part of the German Empire (1871–1918).
Frederick III (Fryderyk III)	Hohenzollern	9 March 1888	15 June 1888	
William II (Wilhelm II)	Hohenzollern	15 June 1888	9 November 1918	Abdicated in 1918.

== See also ==
- List of royal consorts of Partitioned Poland

== Bibliography ==
- Grodziski S., Polska w czasach przełomu (1764-1815), Kraków 2001. ISBN 83-85719-45-8
