= Paul Demetrius von Kotzebue =

Baltic-German Russian officer (1801–1884)

Graf Paul Demetrius von Kotzebue
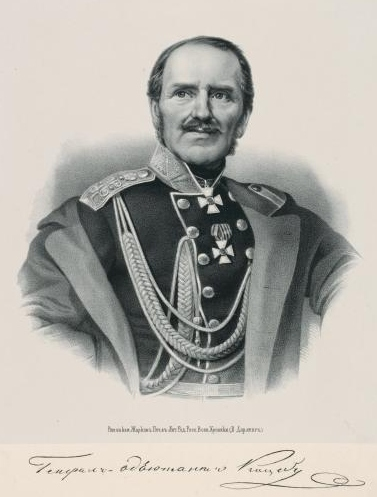
- Portrait, 1858–1861
- Born: 10 August 1801; Berlin, Kingdom of Prussia, Holy Roman Empire
- Died: 19 April 1884 (aged 82); Reval, Governorate of Estonia, Russian Empire
- Military career
- Allegiance: Russian Empire
- Branch: Imperial Russian Army
- Service years: 1819–1884
- Rank: General of the Infantry
- Conflicts: Caucasian Wars; Russo-Persian War (1826–1828); Russo-Turkish War (1828–1829); November Uprising; Crimean War

Paul Demetrius Graf von Kotzebue (Russian: Павел Евстафьевич Коцебу, romanized: Pavel Yevstafevich Kotsebu; 10 August 1801 – 19 April 1884) was a Baltic German statesman and general who was in the service of the Russian Empire.

One of 18 children of the famous German dramatist August von Kotzebue, P. D. Kotzebue was most notable for his military career, especially during the Crimean War as he gained a reputation as a capable and orderly commander. However, Kotzebue was criticised by Russian historians for being highly Germanophile and had an certain level of condescension toward the Russians since he was German.

In additions to his achievements, he was elevated to count in 1874. He was Governor-General of Novorossiysk-Bessarabia and commander of the Odessa Military District from 1862 to 1874, and also Governor-General of Warsaw and commander of the Warsaw Military District from 1874 to 1880. During that period, Austrian observers perceived a build-up of fortresses in Russian Poland, and cavalry maneuvers near the border with Prussia prompted a verbal response from Prussian authorities. In August 1879, the czar arrived in Warsaw to witness military maneuvers himself.
