= Pavel Yengalychev =

Russian Empire prince and general

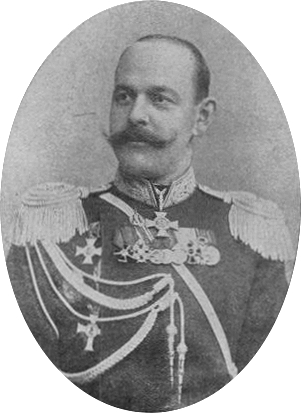

Prince Pavel Nikolayevich Yengalychev (Russian: Павел Николаевич Енгалычев; 25 March 1864 – 12 August 1944, Lausanne) was a Russian prince and general.

He was a member of the noble Engalychev family. From 1894 until 1901 he was the Russian military attaché in Imperial Germany. He was then an observer at the German expeditionary corps during the Boxer Rebellion in Imperial China. He was the last commander of the Warsaw Military District and the last Governor-general of Warsaw before the Russians were forced to retreat from Privislinsky Krai during the First World War. During the Russian Civil War he supported the White movement, and emigrated after the Red Army victory. He died in Lausanne, Switzerland in 1944.

His wife was Marguerite Alexeevna Stenbock-Fermor (1870–1950).
