= Nicholas Engalitcheff =

Russian noble and diplomat (1874–1935)

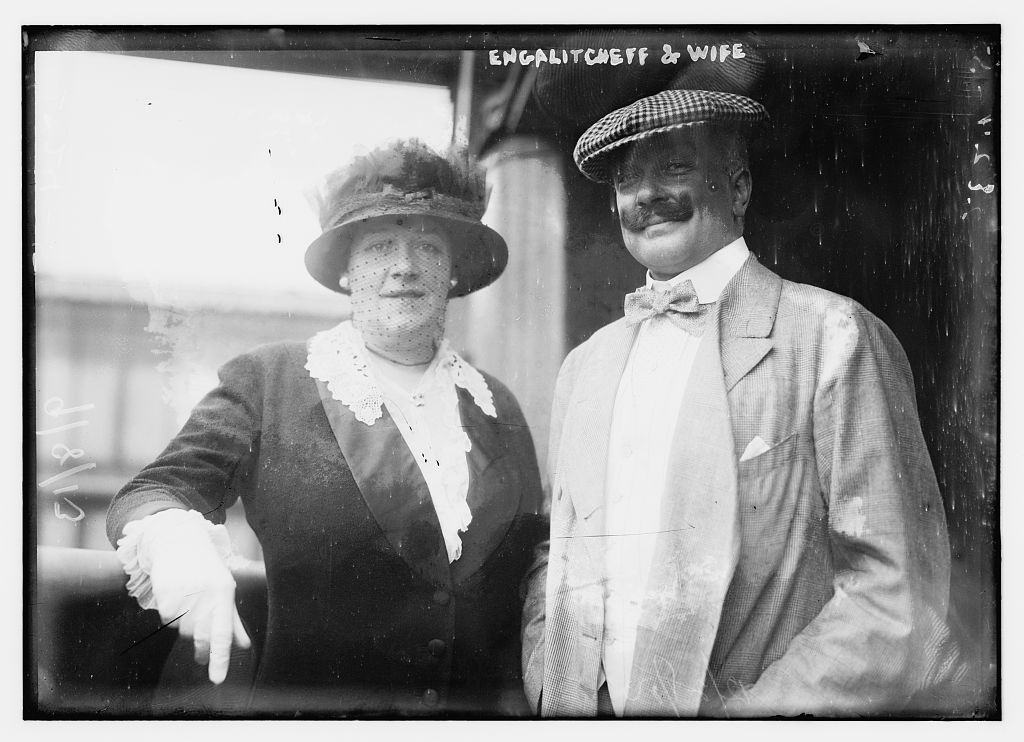

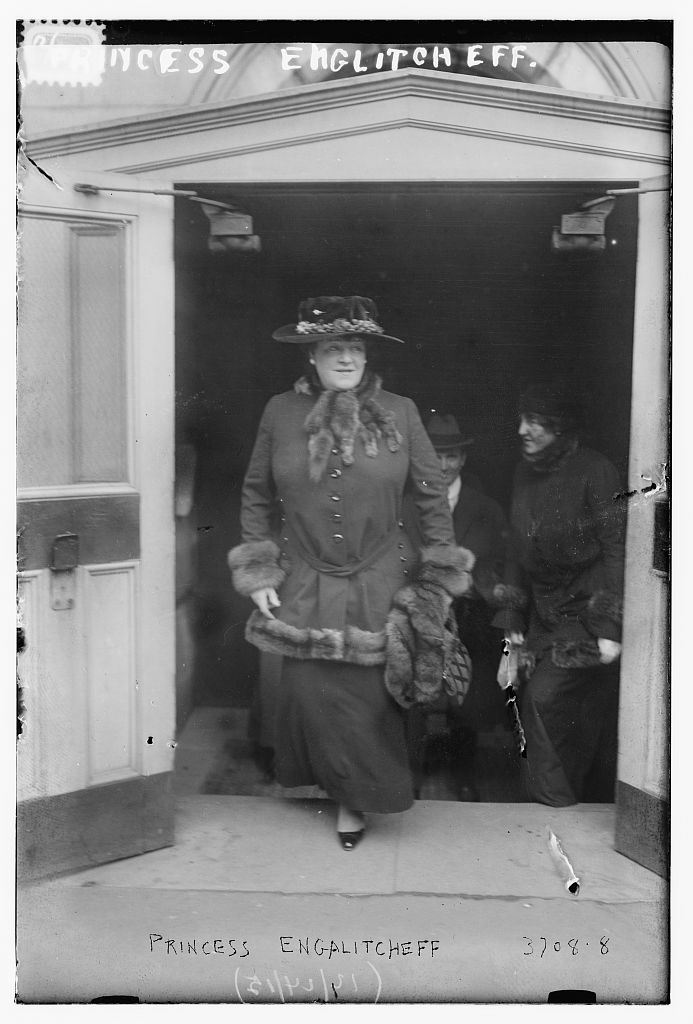
Princess Evelyn Pardridge Engalitcheff on December 24, 1915

Prince Nicholas Engalitcheff (ru: Николай Енгалычев, 1874–1935) was a member of Russian nobility and later the Imperial Russian Vice Consul to Chicago during the early 1900s.

== Biography ==
He married Evelyn Pardridge Clayton, the daughter of Charles Pardridge, in October 1898. They had a son, Vladimir N. Engalitcheff (1902–1923). They lived in a home on 526 W. Deming in Chicago. They divorced in 1916. He married Mélanie de Bertrand-Lyteuil in 1916. By 1921 he was in debt owing over $2,400. He divorced in 1933 and married Susanna Bransford Emery Holmes Delitch. He died in 1935.
