= Cyrillic transcriptions of Polish =

Transcriptions of the Polish language into the Cyrillic script

There are several language-specific systems for transcribing the Polish language into the Cyrillic script.

== Russian Cyrillic ==
The system of the Cyrillization of Polish proper names, as employed in today's Russia, emerged during the 1970s in the post-war Soviet Union. It is a form of orthographic transcription.

Another form of Russian-based Polish Cyrillic has been in use since the early 1990s, in Polish-language religious books produced for Catholics in western Belarus (i.e. Grodno Diocese).

The Lord's prayer:

Ойче наш, ктурысь ест в небе, свенць сен Имен Твое, пшийдзь Крулество Твое, бондзь воля Твоя, яко в небе так и на земи. Хлеба нашего повшеднего дай нам дзисяй. И одпусць нам наше вины, яко и мы одпущамы нашим виновайцом. И не вудзь нас на покушене, але нас збав оде злего. Амен.

The Lord's prayer (Grodno variant):

Ойчэ наш, ктурысь ест в небе, сьвенць се Име Твое, пшыйдзь Крулество Твое, боньдзь воля Твоя, яко в небе так и на земи. Хлеба нашэго повшэднего дай нам дзисяй. И одпусьць нам нашэ вины, яко и мы одпушчамы нашым виновайцом. И не вудзь нас на покушэне, але нас збав одэ злэго. Амэн.

== Ukrainian Cyrillic ==
Ukrainian Cyrillic is mostly the same as Russian, except that и and ы are represented by і and и respectively. є is only used for je.

The Lord's prayer:

Ойче наш, ктурись єст в небе, свенць сен Имен Твоє, пшийдзь Крулество Твоє, бондзь воля Твоя, яко в небе так і на земі. Хлеба нашего повшеднего дай нам дзісяй. І одпусць нам наше віни, яко і ми одпущами нашим віновайцом. І не вудзь нас на покушене, але нас збав оде злего. Амен.

== Serbian Cyrillic ==
I and Y are both represented by И. I between consonants and vowels is represented by Ј (or by ИЈ in names of non-Slavic origin: Julian — Јулијан, Juliusz — Јулијуш, Cyprian — Ципријан, Gabriel — Габријел). L and Ł are both represented by Л. Ó, despite being pronounced as U, is represented by О. Ś and Ź are mostly represented by С and З (SI/ZI before vowels = СЈ/ЗЈ), although Ш and Ж are rarely used. Ш for Ś is used at the end of words (except Łoś — Лос), before Ć/CI, and in the name Śląsk — Шљонск (where also L is exceptionally represented by Љ); Ж for Ź is used at the end of words and before DŹ/DZI.

The Lord's prayer:

Ојче наш, кториш јест в њебје, свјенћ сјен имјен твоје; пшијђ крулество твоје, бонђ вола твоја, јако в њебје так и на земи. Хлеба нашего повшедњего дај нам ђисјај, и одпусћ нам наше вини, јако и ми одпушчами нашим виновајцом. И ње вођ нас в покушење, але нас збав оде злего. Амен.
