= Congress Poland =

Semi-autonomous polity within the Russian Empire (1815–1915)

Coordinates: 52°13′N 21°00′E

Kingdom of Poland: Królestwo Polskie (Polish); Царство Польское (Russian)
- 1815–1915
- Coat of arms
- Motto: Z nami Bóg! (Polish for 'God is with us!')
- Anthem: Pieśń narodowa za pomyślność króla; "National Song to the King's Well-being"
- Europe c. 1815, after the Congress of Vienna. Dark green: Poland; light green: Russian Empire.
- Status: Personal (1815–1831) or real (1832–1915) union with Russian Empire
- Capital: Warsaw
- Official languages: Polish, Russian (from 1867)
- Common languages: Polish, Yiddish, German, Russian
- Religion: Roman Catholicism Minorities: Eastern Catholicism; Reformed Church; Lutheranism; Russian Orthodoxy; Judaism; Sunni Islam
- Demonym: Polish, Pole
- Government: Constitutional (1815–32; 1906–15) or absolute (1832–1906) monarchy
- King
  - 1815–1825 (first): Alexander I
  - 1894–1915 (last): Nicholas II
- Namiestnik (Viceroy)
  - 1815–1826 (first): Józef Zajączek
  - 1863–1874 (last): Fyodor Berg
- Legislature: Sejm
  - Upper house: Senate
  - Lower house: Chamber of Deputies
- History
  - Cong. of Vienna: 9 June 1815
  - Const'n adopted: 27 November 1815
  - November Uprising: 29 November 1830
  - January Uprising: 23 January 1863
  - Russian withdrawal: 19 September 1915

Population
  - 1897 census: 9,402,253
- Currency: Russian ruble and Złoty (1815–41)
Preceded by
| Duchy of Warsaw |
Succeeded by
| 1830: Polish National Government |
| 1914: Ober Ost |
| 1915: Government General of Warsaw |
| Military Government of Lublin |
- Today part of: Poland, Lithuania, and Belarus (Sopoćkinie area)

Congress Poland, (Note: Polish: Królestwo Kongresowe [kruˈlʲɛstfɔ kɔnɡrɛˈsɔvɛ]; Russian: Конгрессовая Польша, romanized: Kongressovaya Polsha) or the Congress Kingdom of Poland, formally known as the Kingdom of Poland, (Note: Russian: Царство Польское, romanized: Tsarstvo Polskoye) was a semi-autonomous Polish state established in 1815 by the Congress of Vienna in personal union with the Russian Empire. Created from parts of Napoleon's Duchy of Warsaw, the kingdom gradually lost its political autonomy following uprisings in 1830 and 1863. (Note: Following the 1863 uprising, the region lost its remaining separate status and was increasingly designated as Vistula Land, though historians debate whether the polity formally ceased to exist in 1915, 1916, or 1918.) Russian rule over the region effectively ended during World War I with the 1915 Russian withdrawal, after which the territory was occupied by the Central Powers.

Following the Partitions of Poland at the end of the 18th century, Poland ceased to exist as an independent nation for 123 years. The territory, with its native population, was split among the Habsburg monarchy, the Kingdom of Prussia, and the Russian Empire. After 1804, an equivalent to Congress Poland within the Austrian Empire was the Kingdom of Galicia and Lodomeria, also commonly referred to as "Austrian Poland". The area incorporated into Prussia initially also held autonomy as the Grand Duchy of Posen outside of the German Confederation, but was later demoted to a mere Prussian province (the Province of Posen), which was subsequently annexed in 1866 into the North German Confederation, the predecessor of the German Empire.

The Congress Kingdom of Poland was theoretically granted considerable political autonomy by the liberal constitution. However, its rulers, the Russian emperors, generally disregarded any restrictions on their power. It was, therefore, little more than a puppet state in a personal union with the Russian Empire. The autonomy was severely curtailed following the 1830–1831 uprising and effectively dismantled after the 1863 uprising. The territory was subsequently integrated directly into the Russian Empire and increasingly referred to in official use as Vistula Land ("Vistula Krai"; Russian: Привислинский край, romanized: Privislinskiy kray; Polish: Kraj Nadwiślański). (Note: Russian: Привислинский край) Thus, Polish autonomy was gradually reduced.

The capital was located in Warsaw, which, towards the beginning of the 20th century, became the Russian Empire's third-largest city after Saint Petersburg and Moscow. The moderately multicultural population of Congress Poland was estimated at 9,402,253 inhabitants in 1897. It was mostly composed of Poles, Polish Jews, ethnic Germans, Ukrainians, Lithuanians, and a small Russian minority. The predominant religion was Roman Catholicism and the official language used within the state was Polish until the failed January Uprising (1863) when Russian became co-official as a consequence. Yiddish and German were widely spoken by their native speakers.

The territory of Congress Poland roughly corresponds to modern-day Kalisz Region and the Lublin, Łódź, Masovian, Podlaskie and Holy Cross Voivodeships of Poland as well as southwestern Lithuania and a small part of the Grodno District of Belarus.

The Kingdom of Poland effectively came to an end with the Great Retreat of Russian forces in 1915 and was succeeded by the Government General of Warsaw, established by the Germans. In 1916, it was succeeded by the short-lived Kingdom of Poland, a client state of the Central Powers, which had a Regency Council instead of a king.

The kingdom was 128,500 km^{2} in area and originally had a population of approximately 3.3 million. The new state would be one of the smallest Polish states ever, smaller than the preceding Duchy of Warsaw and much smaller than the defunct Polish–Lithuanian Commonwealth which had a population of over 10 million and an area of 1 million km2. Its population reached 6.1 million by 1870 and 10 million by 1900. The majority of ethnic Poles within the Russian Empire lived in the Congress Kingdom, although some areas outside its borders were also inhabited by strong Polish and Roman Catholic minorities.

== Naming ==
Although the official name of the state was the Kingdom of Poland (Polish: Królestwo Polskie; Russian: Царство Польское), in order to distinguish it from other Kingdoms of Poland, it is often referred to as "Congress Poland" by historians.

== History ==
=== Background ===
Prussia (which would later become the core of Germany), the Austrian Empire ruled by the Habsburg monarchy, and especially the Russian Empire gained substantial political and military influence over the Polish–Lithuanian Commonwealth, and between 1772 and 1795, established a series of three Partitions of Poland to divide it between them. In 1807, the First French Empire, ruled by Napoleon, conquered land from Prussia, and in the Franco-Prussian treaty of Tilsit, created the Duchy of Warsaw as a semi-independent French client state. In 1809, after the Battle of Wagram in the Austro-Polish War in the War of the Fifth Coalition, France occupied Vienna, resulting in Austria signing the Treaty of Schönbrunn and thereby ceding West Galicia and Zamość District to the duchy, but retaining the remainder of the Kingdom of Galicia and Lodomeria.

In 1812, Napoleon attempted to invade Moscow with the help of many troops from the duchy, but was defeated, leaving Russia with more power. Prussia insisted on the duchy being eliminated. Tsar Alexander I intended to annex the duchy and parts of Lithuanian lands which were historically in the Polish–Lithuanian Commonwealth. Both Austria and the United Kingdom, however, disapproved strongly of the idea, Austria issuing a memorandum on returning to the 1795 resolutions with support from the United Kingdom under Prince George, the Prince-Regent, Prime Minister Lord Liverpool and the British delegate to the Congress, Lord Castlereagh.

=== Initial semi-independence ===
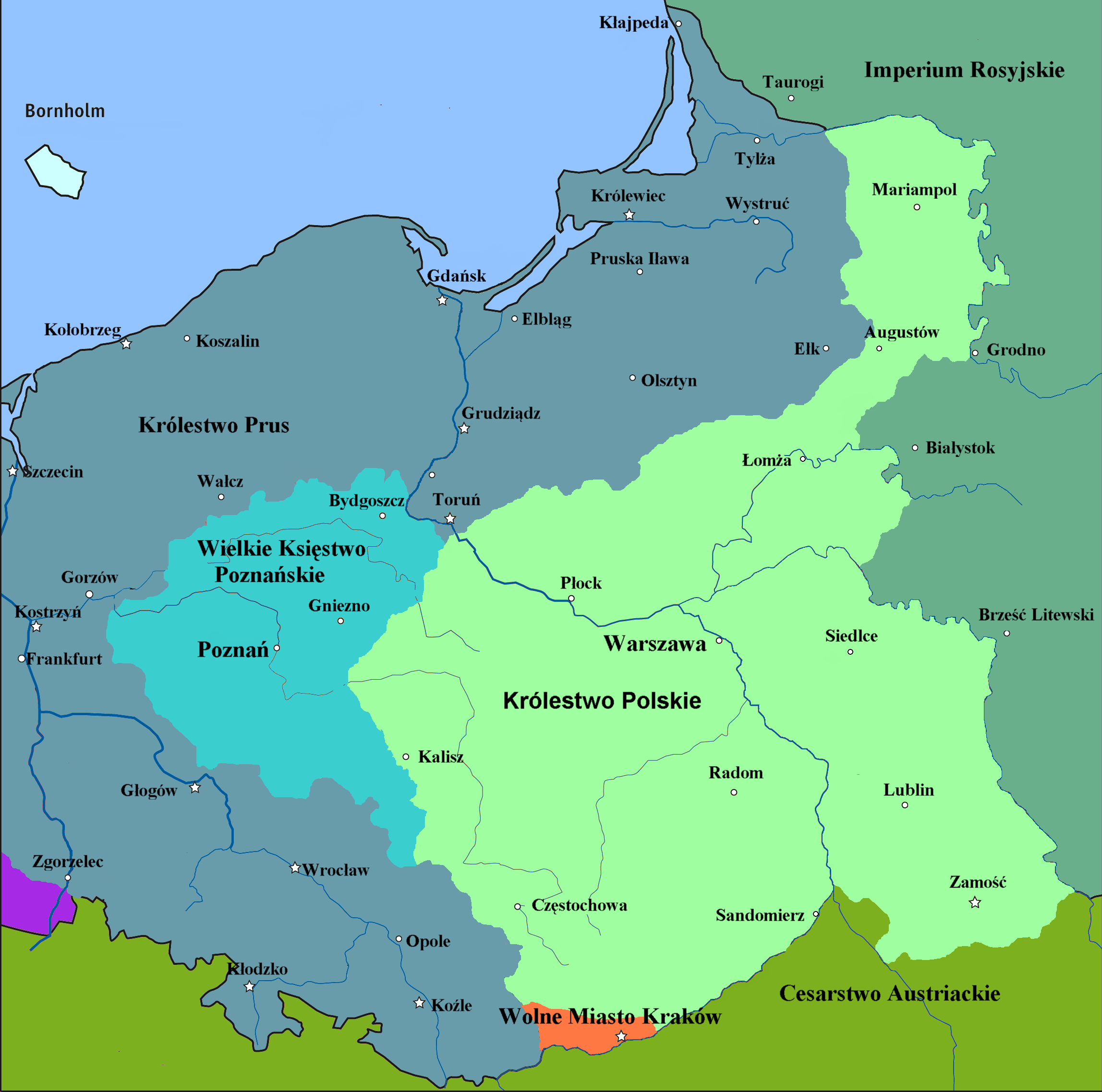

In 1815, following the Treaty of Paris (1814) marking the Sixth Coalition's defeat of the French empire, the Congress of Vienna took the Duchy of Warsaw from France, gave Prussia part of it, forming the Grand Duchy of Posen, and established the rest of it, including Warsaw, as a nominally independent Kingdom of Poland ruled by Russian Tsar Alexander. This kingdom, formed from territory that had previously been part of Austria and Prussia and then a French client state, would be informally known as Congress Poland, named after the Congress of Vienna that created it.

The Kingdom of Poland largely re-emerged as a result of the efforts of Adam Jerzy Czartoryski, a Pole who aimed to resurrect the Polish state in alliance with Russia. The Kingdom of Poland was one of the few contemporary constitutional monarchies in Europe.

Theoretically, the Polish Kingdom in its 1815 form was a semi-autonomous state in a personal union with Russia through the rule of the Russian emperor. The state possessed the Constitution of the Kingdom of Poland, one of the most liberal in 19th century Europe, a Sejm (parliament) responsible to the king capable of voting laws, an independent army, currency, budget, penal code and a customs boundary separating it from the rest of Russian lands. Poland also had democratic traditions (Golden Liberty) and the Polish nobility deeply valued personal freedom. In reality, the kings had absolute power and the formal title of Autocrat, and wanted no restrictions on their rule. All opposition to the emperor of Russia was suppressed and the law was disregarded at will by Russian officials. Though the absolute rule demanded by Russia was difficult to establish due to Poland's liberal traditions and institutions, the independence of the kingdom lasted only 15 years; initially Alexander I used the title King of Poland and was obligated to observe the provisions of the constitution. However, in time, the situation changed and he granted the viceroy, Grand Duke Konstantin Pavlovich, almost dictatorial powers. Very soon after Congress of Vienna resolutions were signed, Russia ceased to respect them. In 1819, Alexander I abolished freedom of the press and introduced preventive censorship. Resistance to Russian control began in the 1820s. Russian secret police commanded by Nikolay Nikolayevich Novosiltsev started the persecution of Polish secret organizations and in 1821, the King ordered the abolition of Freemasonry, which represented Poland's patriotic traditions. Beginning in 1825, the sessions of the Sejm were held in secret.

=== Uprisings and loss of autonomy ===
Alexander I's successor, Nicholas I was crowned King of Poland on 24 May 1829 in Warsaw and swore to abide by the Constitution, but he continued to limit the independence of the Polish kingdom. Nicholas' rule promoted the idea of Official Nationality, consisting of Orthodoxy, Autocracy, and Nationality. In relation to Poles, those ideas meant assimilation: turning them into loyal subjects through gradual religious and cultural conversion. The principle of Orthodoxy was the result of the special role it played in the Russian Empire, as the Church was in fact becoming a department of state, and other religions were discriminated against; for instance, papal bulls could not be read in the largely Catholic kingdom of Poland without agreement from the Russian government.

The rule of Nicholas also meant the end of political traditions in Poland; democratic institutions were removed, an appointed—rather than elected—centralized administration was put in place, and efforts were made to change the relations between the state and the individual. All of this led to discontent and resistance among the Polish population. In January 1831, the Sejm deposed Nicholas I as King of Poland in response to his repeated curtailing of its constitutional rights. Nicholas reacted by sending Russian troops into Poland, which resulted in an amplification of the ongoing insurrection, the November Uprising.

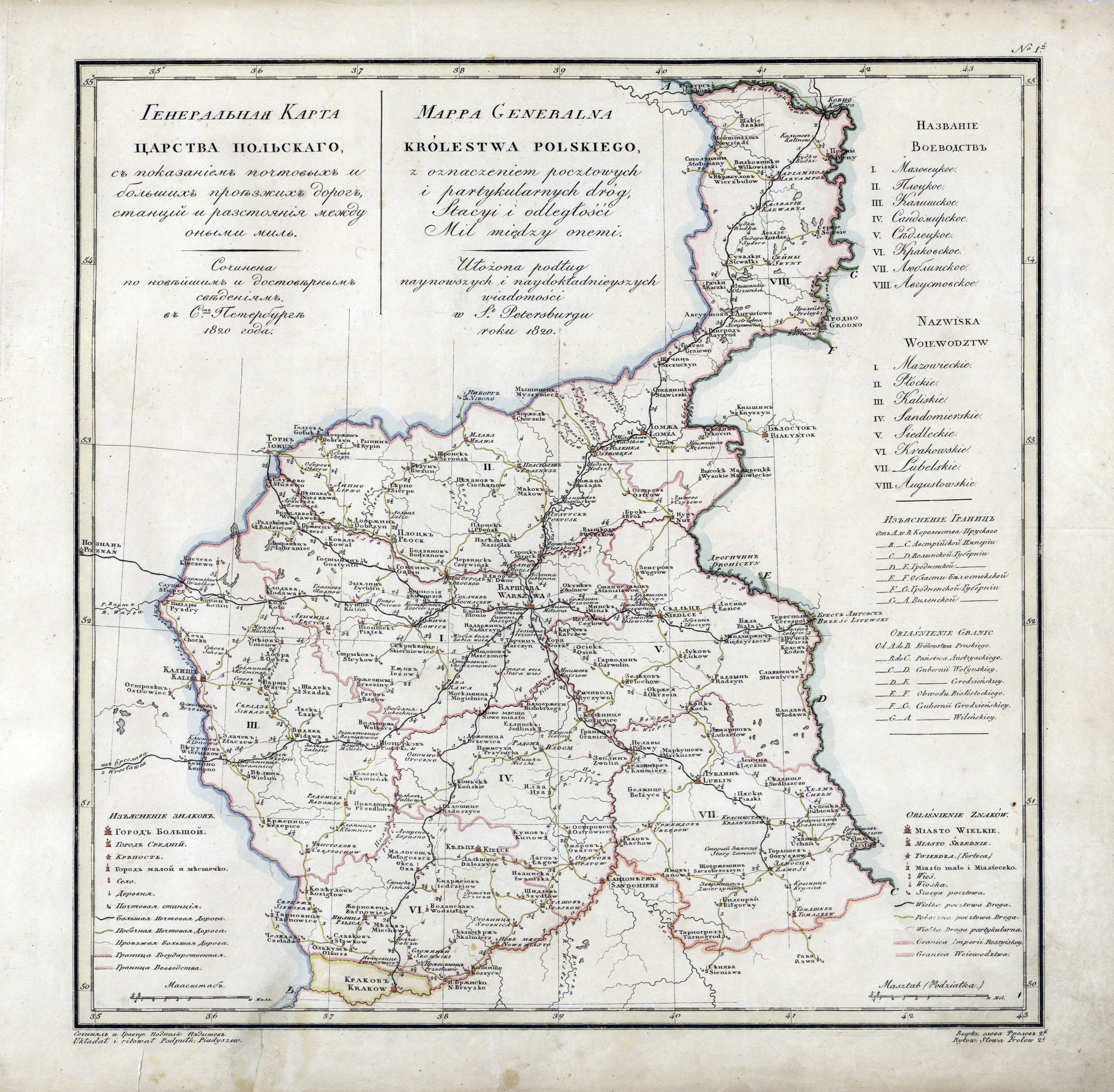
Congress Poland in 1820

Following the defeat of the insurrection in 1831 after an 11-month military campaign, the Congress Kingdom's autonomy and its separate institutions and administrative arrangements (including the Polish Army, the parliament [Sejm], and local self-administration) were disbanded and abolished, as part of increased Russification, to more closely integrate it into the Russian Empire. Poles faced confiscation of property, deportation, forced military service, and the closure of their own universities. The kingdom lost its status as a semi-independent sovereign state and the administrative divisions were reorganized, but it nevertheless retained a degree of distinctiveness.

The subordination was formalized through the issuing of the Organic Statute of the Kingdom of Poland by the Emperor in 1832, which was much less liberal, though never fully implemented, and repealed the Constitution of the Kingdom of Poland and formally abolished the army and legislative assembly. Universities were closed and later replaced by Russian-language high schools. Over the next 30 years, a series of measures bound Congress Poland ever more closely to Russia.

For a short time, the territory maintained a certain degree of autonomy. The former Kingdom of Poland continued to use the Polish currency (złoty) and the Administrative Council retained some of its privileges (although it was directly controlled by the Russian governor Field Marshal Ivan Paskevich). However, the territory's separate status was gradually eroded.

After 1837, all voivodeships that constituted the Kingdom of Poland were turned into governorates and became an integral part of the Russian administrative division, ruled directly by the Russian tsars.

The Russian ruble became the legal tender in 1841 and the customs border was abolished in 1851. The metric system and the Polish penal code were also abolished (the latter replaced by the Russian penal code, de facto in use since the Uprising began).

In 1863, the January Uprising broke out (resulting in Russia and Prussia signing the Alvensleben Convention on February 8) but lasted only two years before being crushed. As a direct result, any remaining separate status of the kingdom was removed and the political entity was directly incorporated into the Russian Empire.

=== Vistula Land ===
Vistula Land: Привислинский край (Russian); Kraj Nadwiślański (Polish)
- Krai of the Russian Empire
- 1867–1915
- Coat of arms

Vistula Land, also known as Vistula Krai (Russian: Привислинский край, romanized: Privislinskiy kray; Polish: Kraj Nadwiślański), was the name applied in official Russian usage to the lands of Congress Poland starting in 1867, in an effort to remove the Polish national identity from the administrative map. The territory was initially administered by a Namestnik (Viceroy). It also continued to be formally known as the Kingdom of Poland (Polish: Królestwo Polskie) until the fall of the Russian Empire. (Note: Sources agree that after the fall of the January Uprising in 1864, the autonomy of Congress Poland was drastically reduced. However, they disagree on whether the state of the Kingdom of Poland (colloquially known as Congress Poland) was officially replaced by Vistula Land as a province of the Russian Empire, as many sources still use the term Congress Poland for the post-1864 period. The sources are also unclear as to when the Kingdom of Poland (or Vistula Land) officially ceased to exist; some argue it ended with the assumption of control by the German and Austro-Hungarian occupying authorities; others, that it ended with the proclamation of the Regency Kingdom of Poland in 1916; finally, some argue that it occurred only with the creation of the independent Second Polish Republic in 1918. Examples: Polish Academy of Sciences, Institute of Geographical and Spatial Organization, p. 539, : "Despite the introduction of the official name Vistula Land, terms such as Kingdom of Poland, Congress Poland, or in short Kongresówka were still in use, both in everyday language and in some publications." (Original in Polish: Mimo wprowadzenia oficjalnej nazwy...); POWSTANIE STYCZNIOWE, Encyklopedia Interia: "After the fall of the uprising the last elements of autonomy of the Kingdom of Poland (including the name) were abolished, transforming it into the 'Vistula land'."; Królestwo Polskie Archived 2017-04-24 at the Wayback Machine. Encyklopedia WIEM: "Kingdom of Poland after the January Uprising: the name Kingdom of Poland was replaced, in official documents, by the name of Vistula land." However, the same article also inconsistently states: "After the revolution 1905-1907 in the Kingdom of Poland..." and "In the years 1914-1916 the Kingdom of Poland became...".; Królestwo Polskie, Królestwo Kongresowe Archived 2011-06-07 at the Wayback Machine, Encyklopedia PWN: "[Congress Poland was] under German and Austro-Hungarian occupation from 1915 to 1918; K.P [abbreviation for Królestwo Polskie] was finally abolished after the creation of the Second Polish Republic in November 1918.")

The 1867 reform, initiated after the failure of the January Uprising, was designed to tie the Kingdom of Poland more tightly to the administration structure of the Russian Empire. It divided larger governorates into smaller ones and introduced a new lower-level entity, gminas. There were 10 governorates: five on the right bank of the Vistula River—Suwałki, Łomża, Płock, Siedlce, and Lublin—and the remaining five on the left bank: Kalisz, Warsaw, Piotrków, Radom, and Kielce.

Despite the abolition of the Kingdom of Poland, the tsars of Russia retained the title "Tsar of Poland".

The Catholic Church was persecuted and most monasteries were closed and nationalized. In 1875, following the rules of the Synod of Polotsk of 1839, the Eparchy of Chełm-Belz of the Catholic Ruthenian Uniate Church disbanded itself and united with the Russian Orthodox Church. In 1874 or 1875, the office of Namestnik was abolished and the territory was governed by the Governor-General of Warsaw.

In the 1880s, the official language was changed to Russian, and Polish was banned both from official use and education.

The name Vistula Land first appeared in official documents in 1888 although more recent scholarship traced it back to 1883.

A minor reform of 1893 transferred some territory from the Płock and Łomża Governorates to Warsaw Governorate. A more extensive 1912 reform created a new governorate—Chełm Governorate (Kholmskaya Guberniya in Russian)—from parts of the Siedlce and Lublin Governorates. However this was split off from the Privislinsky Krai and made part of the Southwestern Krai of the Russian Empire, in order to facilitate its russification.

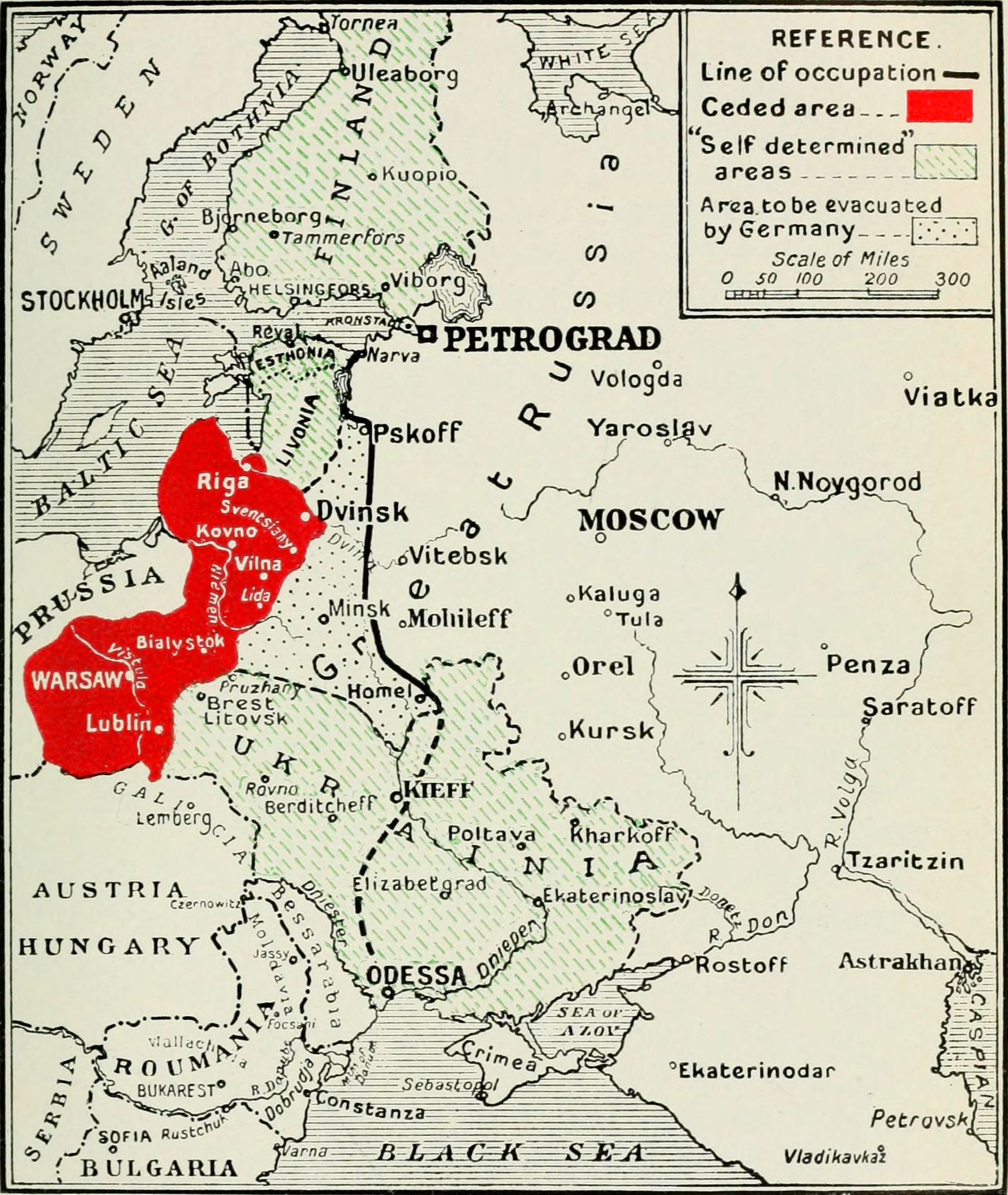
Russian Poland, Lithuania and Courland were officially yielded on terms of the Treaty of Brest-Litovsk (marked in red).

The First World War initially expanded Russian control of Poland after the Imperial Russian Army scored a series of early victories against Austria-Hungary on the Eastern Front and occupied Eastern Galicia. Within a year the Austro-Hungarian Army and the Imperial German Army reoccupied the territory and counterattacked into Russian Poland in the Gorlice–Tarnów offensive. During the Imperial Russian Army's subsequent Great Retreat, it looted and abandoned the Kingdom of Poland, trying to emulate the scorched-earth policy adopted during the 1812 invasion. The Russians also evicted and deported hundreds of thousands of the area's inhabitants whom they suspected of collaborating with the enemy.

As the Russians retreated in 1915, the Central Powers occupied the area, taking control of the region from Russia. Subsequently, they proposed the establishment of the Kingdom of Poland. Following the 1917 October Revolution, in the March 1918 Treaty of Brest-Litovsk, Russia (by then embroiled in a civil war), effectively ceded all Polish territories it had formerly possessed to the German Empire and Austria-Hungary.

== Government ==
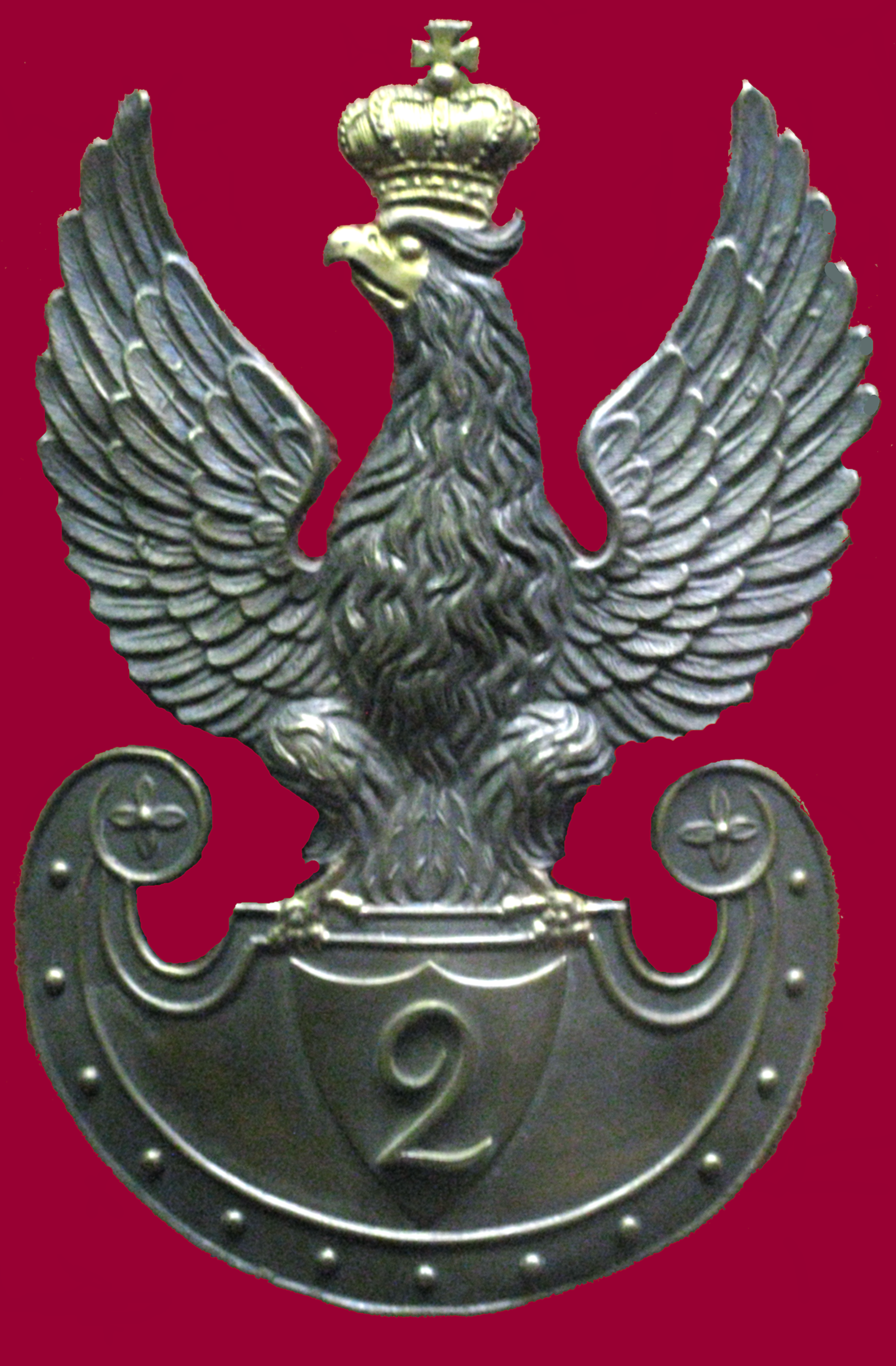
Eagle of an officer in the Army of Congress Poland

The government of Congress Poland was outlined in the Constitution of the Kingdom of Poland in 1815. The emperor of Russia was the official head of state, considered the king of Poland, with the local government headed by the viceroy of the Kingdom of Poland (Polish: Namiestnik), Council of State and Administrative Council, in addition to the Sejm.

In theory, Congress Poland possessed one of the most liberal governments of the time in Europe, but in practice, the area was a client state of the Russian Empire. The liberal provisions of the constitution, and the scope of the autonomy, were often disregarded by the Russian officials.

Polish remained an official language until the mid-1860s when it was replaced by Russian. This resulted in bilingual street signs and documents, however, the full implementation of Cyrillic script into the Polish language failed.

=== Executive leadership ===
The office of "namiestnik" was introduced in Poland by the 1815 constitution of Congress Poland. The viceroy was chosen by the king from among the noble citizens of the Russian Empire or the Kingdom of Poland. The viceroy supervised the entire public administration and, in the monarch's absence, chaired the Council of State, as well as the Administrative Council. He could veto the councils' decisions; other than that, his decisions had to be countersigned by the appropriate government minister. The viceroy exercised broad powers and could nominate candidates for most senior government posts (ministers, senators, judges of the High Tribunal, councilors of state, referendaries, bishops, and archbishops). He had no competence in the realms of finances and foreign policy; his military competence varied.

The office of "namiestnik" or viceroy was never abolished; however, the last "namiestnik" was Friedrich Wilhelm Rembert von Berg, who served from 1863 to his death in 1874. No "namiestnik" was named to replace him; however, the role of "namestnik" — viceroy of the former kingdom passed to the governor-general of Warsaw — or, to be more specific, of the Warsaw Military District (Polish: Warszawski Okręg Wojskowy, Russian: Варшавский Военный Округ).

The governor-general answered directly to the emperor and exercised much broader powers than had the "namiestnik". In particular, he controlled all the military forces in the region and oversaw the judicial systems (he could impose death sentences without trial). He could also issue "declarations with the force of law," which could alter existing laws.

=== Administrative Council ===
The Administrative Council (Polish: Rada Administracyjna) was a part of the Council of State of the kingdom. Introduced by the Constitution of the Kingdom of Poland in 1815, it was composed of five ministers, special nominees of the king and the viceroy of the Kingdom of Poland. The council executed the king's will and ruled in cases outside the minister's competence and prepared projects for the Council of State.

== Administrative divisions ==
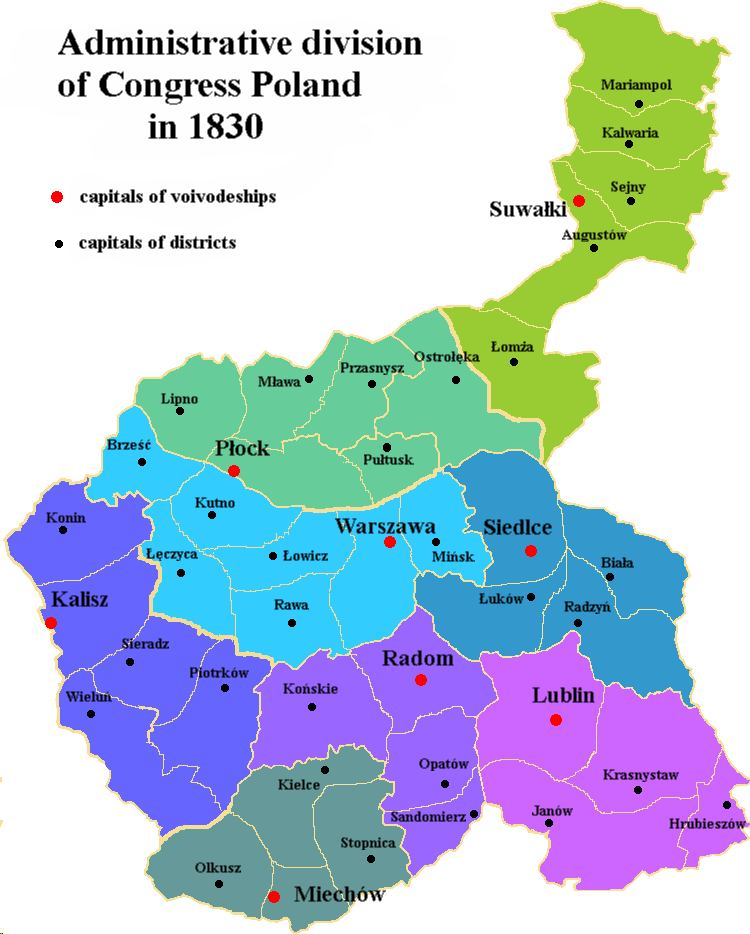
1830

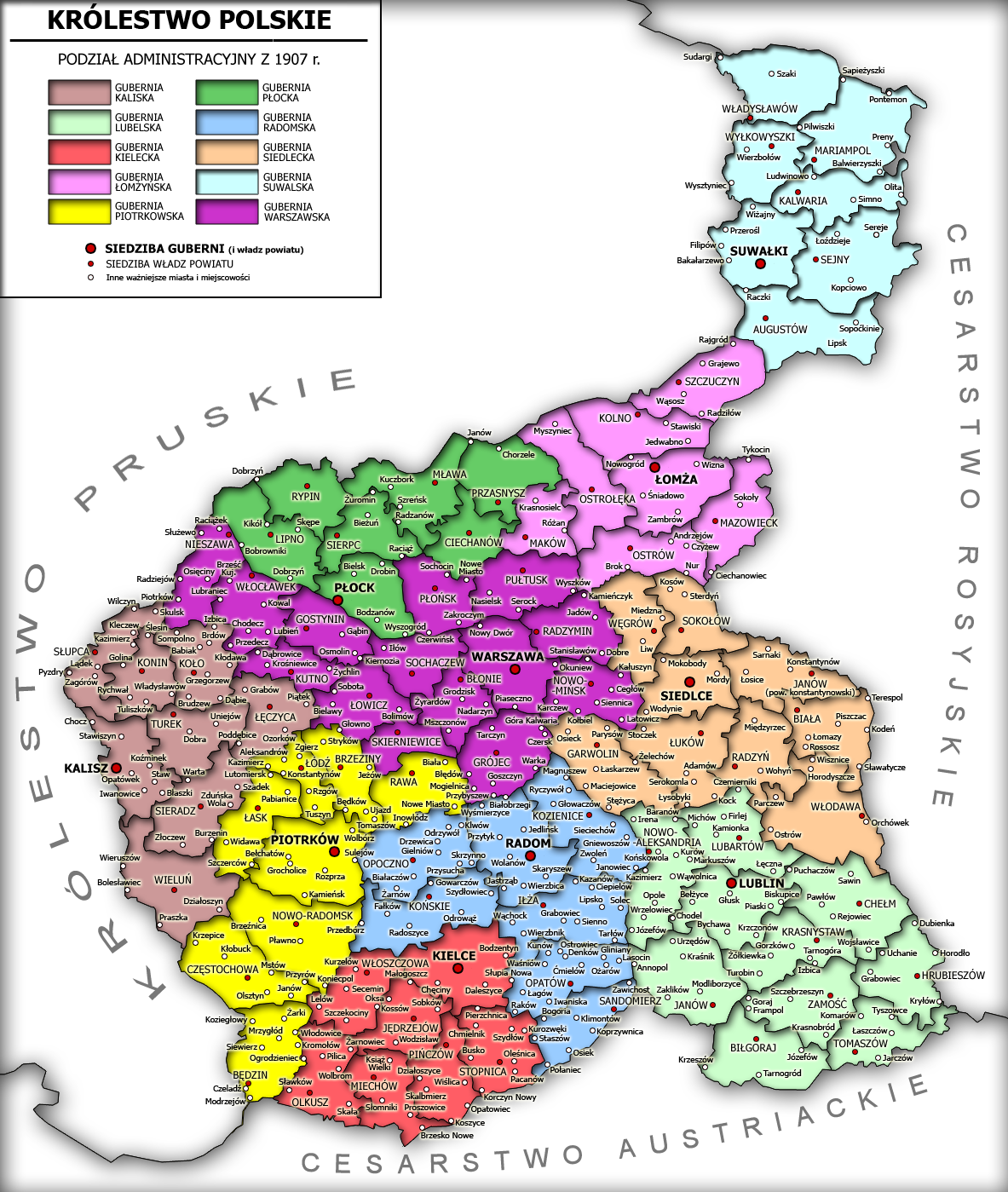
1907

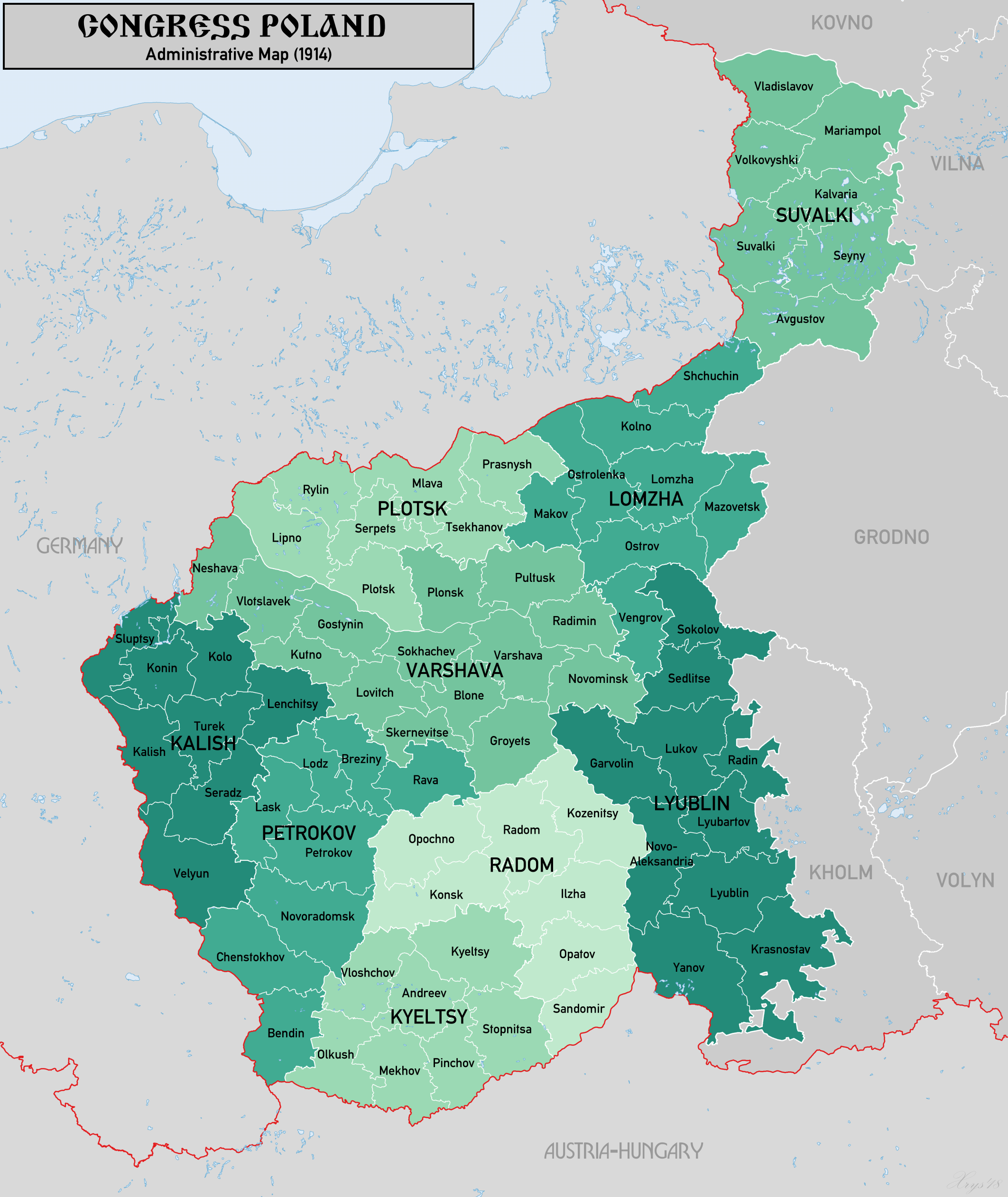
1914

The administrative divisions of the kingdom changed several times over its history, and various smaller reforms were also carried out, which either changed the smaller administrative units or merged/split various subdivisions.

Immediately after its creation in 1815, the Kingdom of Poland was divided into departments, a relic from the times of the French-dominated Duchy of Warsaw.

On 16 January 1816, the administrative division was reformed, with the departments being replaced with more traditionally Polish voivodeships (of which there were eight), obwóds and powiats. On 7 March 1837, in the aftermath of the November Uprising earlier that decade, the administrative division was reformed again, bringing Congress Poland closer to the structure of the Russian Empire, with the introduction of guberniyas (governorate, Polish spelling gubernia). In 1842, the powiats were renamed okręgs, and the obwóds were renamed powiats. In 1844, several governorates were merged with others, and some others were renamed; five governorates remained.

In 1867, following the failure of the January Uprising, further reforms were instituted, which were designed to bring the administrative structure of Poland closer to that of the Russian Empire. It divided larger governorates into smaller ones, introduced the gmina (a new lower-level entity), and restructured the existing five governorates into 10. The 1912 reform created a new governorate – Kholm Governorate – from parts of the Sedlets and Lublin Governorates. It was made part of the Southwestern Krai of the Russian Empire.

== Economy ==
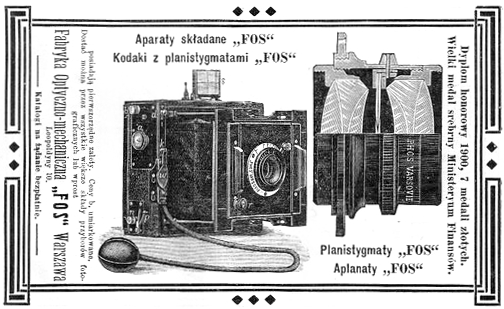
An advertisement of cameras made by a Polish company FOS (1905). Cameras, objectives and stereoscopes were exclusively made in Congress Poland.

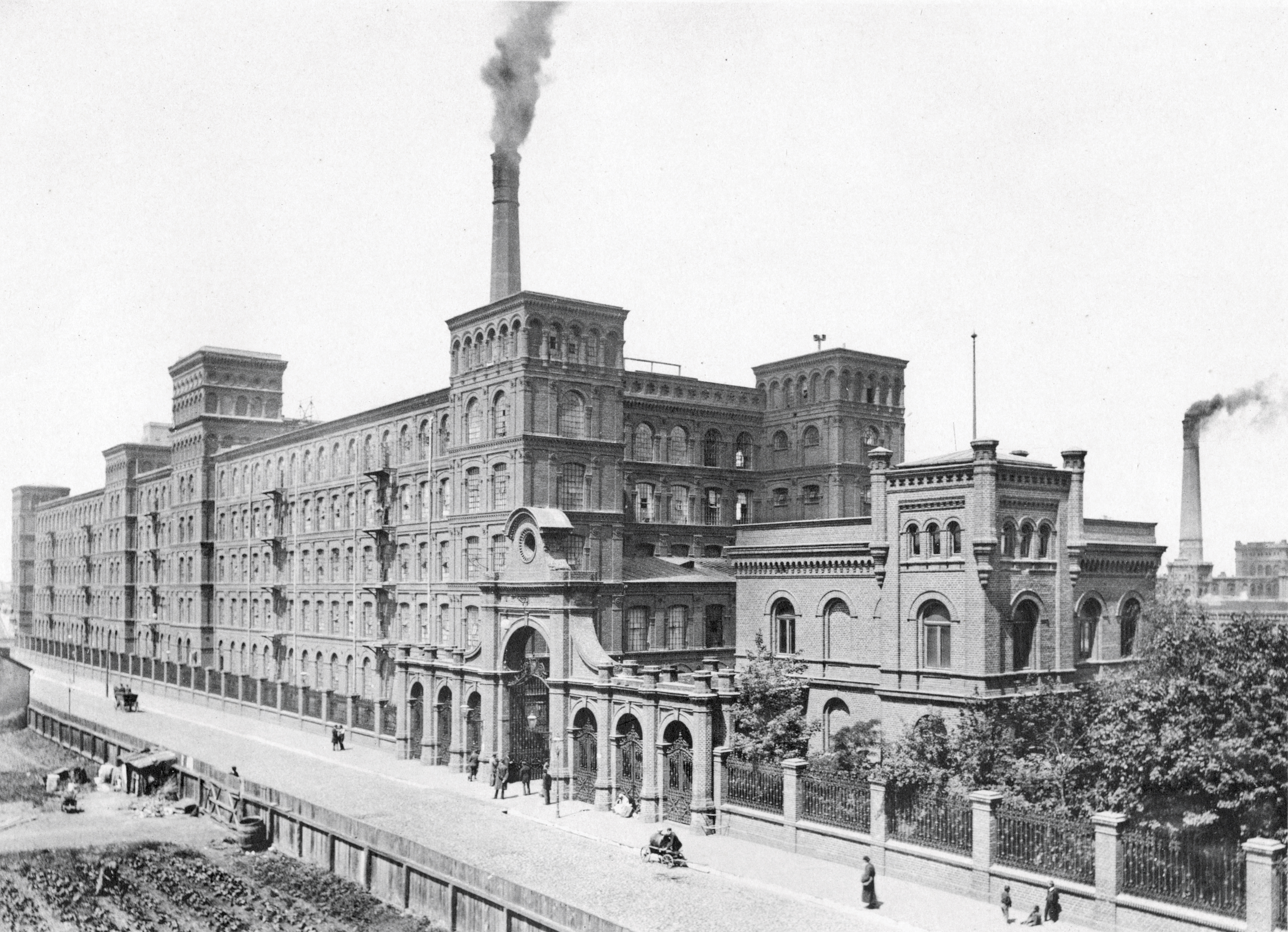
An early photograph of Manufaktura in Łódź. The city was considered to be one of the largest textile industry centres in Europe and was nicknamed Polish Manchester.

Despite the fact that the economic situation varied at times, Congress Poland became the most industrialised region of the Russian Empire. In the mid 1800s, the region became heavily industrialised, however, agriculture still maintained a major role in the economy. In addition, the export of wheat, rye and other crops was significant in stabilizing the financial output. An important trade partner of Congress Poland was Great Britain, which imported goods in large amounts.

Since agriculture was equivalent to 70% of the national income, the most important economic transformations included the establishment of mines and the textile industry; the development of these sectors brought more profit and higher tax revenues. The beginnings were difficult due to floods and an intense diplomatic relationship with Prussia. It was not until 1822 that Prince Francis Xavier Drucki-Lubecki negotiated to open the Polish market to the world. He also tried to introduce appropriate protective duties. A large and profitable investment was the construction of the Augustów Canal connecting the Narew and Neman Rivers, which allowed bypassing Danzig (Gdańsk) and high Prussian tariffs. Drucki-Lubecki also founded the Bank Polski, for which he is mostly remembered.

The first Polish steam mill was built in 1828 in Warsaw-Solec; the first textile machine was installed in 1829. Greater use of machines led to production in the form of workshops. The government also encouraged foreign specialists, mostly Germans, to maintain larger establishments or to undertake production. By 1887, 550 of the 29,000 Prussian landowners in Poland were manufacturers. The Germans were also relieved of the tax burden. This facilitated the creation of one of the largest European textile centres in Łódź and in surrounding towns like Ozorków and Zduńska Wola. These small and initially insignificant settlements later developed into large and multicultural cities, where Germans and Jews were the majority in the population. With the abolition of border customs in 1851 and further economic growth, Polish cities were gaining wealth and importance. Most notably, Warsaw, being associated with the construction of railway lines and bridges, gained priority in the entire Russian market.

Although economic and industrial progress occurred rapidly, agriculture remained the primary sector. Most farms, called folwarks, were large estates owned by the nobility and worked by landless peasants. In 1864, following the outbreak of the January Uprising, the Russian administration enacted a specific land reform (the "enfranchisement") that granted ownership rights to the peasants. This was a political move designed to undermine the rebellious Polish nobility by securing the loyalty of the peasantry to the Russian Empire, effectively breaking the economic power of the landed gentry.

Congress Poland was the largest supplier of zinc in Europe. The development of the zinc industry took place at the beginning of the 19th century. It was mostly caused by the significant increase in demand for zinc, mainly in industrialised countries of Western Europe.

In 1899, Aleksander Ginsberg founded the company FOS (Fabryka Przyrządów Optycznych - "Factory of Optical Equipment") in Warsaw, which produced cameras, telescopes, objectives and stereoscopes. Following the outbreak of World War I, the factory was moved to Saint Petersburg.

In the late 1890s and early 1900s, Russia experienced a coal crisis marked by coal shortages and high prices. This was attributed to the dramatic increase in industrial output and a still nascent coal mining industry. In 1900, because of coal shortages in the Warsaw industrial region, the Minister of Finance approved the duty-free import of 125,000,000 poods of coal.

== Demographics ==
Population^{(by year)}
| Year | Pop. |
|---|---|
| 1814 | 2,815,000 |
| 1820 | 3,520,355 |
| 1825 | 3,911,000 |
| 1830 | 3,998,000 |
| 1835 | 4,188,112 |
| 1840 | 4,488,009 |
| 1845 | 4,798,658 |
| 1850 | 4,810,735 |
| 1855 | 4,673,869 |
| 1860 | 4,840,466 |
| 1865 | 5,336,210 |
| 1870 | 6,078,564 |
| 1875 | 6,515,153 |
| 1880 | 7,104,864 |
| 1885 | 7,687,893 |
| 1890 | 8,256,562 |
| 1897 | 9,402,253 |
| 1904 | 11,588,585 |
| 1909 | 11,935,318 |
| 1913 | 13,058,000 |
Source: Golab (1977)

According to the Russian Empire Census of 1897, Congress Poland had a population of 9,402,253: 4,712,090 men and 4,690,163 women.

Linguistic composition of Congress Poland in 1897
| Language | Native speakers | % |
|---|---|---|
| Polish | 6,755,503 | 71.85 |
| Yiddish | 1,267,194 | 13.48 |
| German | 407,274 | 4.33 |
| Ukrainian (Little Russian) | 335,337 | 3.57 |
| Lithuanian | 305,322 | 3.25 |
| Russian | 267,160 | 2.84 |
| Belarusian | 29,347 | 0.31 |
| Other | 35,116 | 0.37 |
| TOTAL | 9,402,253 | 100.00 |

== See also ==
- Geographical Dictionary of the Kingdom of Poland
- Grand Duchy of Finland (1809–1917)
- Grand Duchy of Posen
- Great Retreat – the withdrawal of Russian forces from Poland in 1915
- History of Poland (1795–1918)
- Kresy
- Pale of Settlement
- Western Krai
