= Countersign (legal) =

Second signature on legal document

In law, countersignature refers to a second signature onto a document. For example, a contract or other official document signed by the representative of a company may be countersigned by their supervisor to verify the authority of the representative. Also, a money order or other financial instrument may be signed once upon receipt, then signed again by the same person when presented for payment, as an indication that the bearer is the same person who originally received the item, and not a thief who has stolen the item before it could be carried to the place where it was to be presented.

An example in which a countersignature is needed is with British passport applications.

In some constitutional monarchies and parliamentary republics, an order by the head of state (monarch or president respectively) is not valid unless countersigned by another authorized relevant person such as the head of government or a responsible minister, who then assumes political responsibility for the act. This effectively codifies the principle that the head of state almost always exercises their powers on the advice of the government. In the case of promulgation of a parliamentary resolution, the parliamentary speaker countersigns the act.
