= Cyrillization of Polish under the Russian Empire =

Cyrillic orthography of Polish used under the Russian Empire

Between 1772 and 1815, the Russian Empire seized about four-fifths of Poland-Lithuania, where Polish was the leading official language. Polish remained the official language of the incorporated Polish-Lithuanian territories until the late 1830s. Later, it was fully replaced with Russian in the mid-1860s. A middle stage for the transition was the use of the Russian-style Cyrillic for writing Polish.

== Letters ==
А а A a	Б б B b	В в W w	Г г G g	Д д D d	Е е Ie ie	Ё ё Io io	Ж ж Ż ż	З з Z z	И и I i	І і I i
К к K k	Л л L l	М м M m	Н н N n	О о O o	О̂ о̂ Ó ó	П п P p	Р р R r	Р̌ р̌ Rz rz	С с S s	Т т T t
У у U u	Ф ф F f	Х х Ch ch	Х̾ х̾ H h	Ц ц C c	Ч ч Cz cz	Ш ш Sz sz	Щ щ Szcz szcz	Ъ ъ -	Ы ы Y y	Ь ь -
Э э E e	Ю ю Iu iu	Ю̂ ю̂ Ió ió	Я я Ia ia	Й й J j	А̨ а̨ Ą ą	Я̨ я̨ Ią ią	Э̨ э̨ Ę ę	Е̨ е̨ Ię ię

== Example text ==
Cyrillic script

Поврôтъ Таты, пp̌езъ А. Мицкевича

«Пôйдзьце, о дзятки, пôйдзьце вшистке разэмъ
За място, подъ слупъ на взгôрэкъ,
Тамъ пp̌едъ цудовнымъ клęкнийце образэмъ,
Побожне змôвце пацю̂рэкъ.

Тато не враца; ранки и вечоры
Вэ Лзахъ го чекамъ и трводзэ;
Розлялы p̌еки, пэлнэ звеp̌а боры,
И пэлно збôйцôвъ на дродзэ».

Слышąцъ то дзятки бегнą вшистке разэмъ
За място, подъ слупъ на взгôрэкъ,
Тамъ пp̌едъ цудовнымъ клęкая̨ образемъ,
И зачиная̨ пацю̂рэкъ.

Цалуя̨ земę, потэмъ: «Въ имę Ойца,
Сына и Духа свęтэго,
Бąдзь похвалёна пp̌енайсьвęтша Трôйца
Тэразъ и часу вшелькего»…

Latin script

Powrót Taty, przez A. Mickiewicza

«Pójdźcie, o dziatki, pójdźcie wszystkie razem
Za miasto, pod słup na wzgórek,
Tam przed cudownym klęknijcie obrazem,
Pobożnie zmówcie paciórek.

Tato nie wraca; ranki i wieczory
We łzach go czekam i trwodze;
Rozlały rzeki, pełne zwierza bory,
I pełno zbójców na drodze».

Słysząc to dziatki biegą wszystkie razem,
Za miasto, pod słup na wzgórek,
Tam przed cudownym klękają obrazem
I zaczynają paciórek.

Całują ziemię, potem: «W imię Ojca,
Syna i Ducha świętego,
Bądź pochwalona, przenajświętsza Trójca,
Teraz i czasu wszelkiego»…
