= 51st Infantry Regiment (Russian Empire) =

51st Lithuanian Infantry Regiment
- Badge of the 51st Lithuanian Infantry Regiment, instituted on 26 September 1908
- Active: 1809–1917
- Country: Russian Empire
- Branch: Imperial Russian Army; Russian Army (1917)
- Type: Infantry
- Garrison/HQ: Sveaborg (1809–?); Simferopol, Taurida Governorate (1903–1913)
- Anniversaries: December 6 (Regiment holiday)
- Engagements: Napoleonic Wars; French invasion of Russia; Second Battle of Polotsk; Battle of Chashniki; Battle of Borisov; War of the Sixth Coalition; German campaign of 1813; Siege of Danzig; Battle of Leipzig; Campaign in north-east France (1814); Battle of Craonne; Battle of Laon; Battle of Paris; November Uprising; First Battle of Wawer; Battle of Olszynka Grochowska; Second Battle of Wawer; Caucasian War; Battle of Dargo (1845); Hungarian Revolution of 1848; Summer Campaign (1849); Crimean War; Siege of Sevastopol (1854–1855); World War I

The 51st Lithuanian Infantry Regiment (Russian: Литовский 51-й пехотный полк; Lithuanian: 51-asis Lietuvos pėstininkų pulkas), known from 1904 as the 51st Lithuanian Infantry Regiment of His Imperial Highness Heir to the Tsarevich (Russian: 51-й пехотный Литовский Его Императорского Высочества Наследника Цесаревича полк) was an infantry regiment of the Imperial Russian Army.

== Formation ==
The regiment was established as the Sveaborg Garrison Regiment on 22 October 1809 through the amalgamation of the 2nd Fredrikshamn and the Villmanstrand Garrison Battalions.

On 11 January 1811, the regiment's 12 companies were reorganized into the three-battalion Lithuanian Musketeer Regiment, which was renamed the Lithuanian Infantry Regiment on 22 February 1811.

== 19th century ==
=== Napoleonic Wars ===
On 6 November 1811, the Lithuanian Infantry Regiment and the Neva Infantry Regiment were combined to form the 2nd Brigade of the 21st Infantry Division.

During the French invasion of Russia in 1812, the regiment first saw combat in October during the Second Battle of Polotsk. It subsequently took part in the battles of Chashniki, Borisov, and Studyanka.

In 1813, after crossing the Vistula, the regiment joined the corps engaged in the siege of Danzig before moving on to Poznań. It later served in the detachment commanded by General Ferdinand von Wintzingerode and took part in the Battle of Leipzig. On 6 January 1814, the regiment crossed the Rhine near Düsseldorf.

During the Campaign in north-eastern France in 1814, the regiment fought in the battles of Craonne, Laon, and Paris.

On 4 July 1817, the Lithuanian Infantry Regiment was assigned to the Lithuanian Separate Corps.

=== November Uprising ===
At the outbreak of the November Uprising in 1830, the regiment was transferred to the active army and took part in the battles of Dobre, Wawer, and Olszynka Grochowska.

On 14 February 1831, the regiment's 3rd Battalion was detached to form the 58th Infantry Regiment. It was subsequently replaced by the 3rd Battalion of Field Marshal Count von der Sacken's Infantry Regiment toward the end of the war.

On 19 March 1831, the 1st and 2nd Battalions, serving in the vanguard of Adjutant General Friedrich Caspar von Geismar, were attacked by the entire Polish army and decisively defeated at the Second Battle of Wawer. Surrounded on all sides and heavily outnumbered, most of the regiment's remaining troops laid down their arms and surrendered, along with two regimental colours and two guns.

The regiment suffered heavy losses in the battle. Its commander, 22 officers, and 1,140 other ranks were lost, including 14 officers and 759 other ranks taken prisoner. Only six officers and 236 other ranks managed to fight their way through the enemy lines with bayonets.

The regimental historian later described the surrender as an exceptional episode in the history of the Russian army:

The capitulation of the Lithuanian Regiment in the open field appears to be an exceptional example in the Russian army, whose regiments preferred to be exterminated rather than lay down their weapons before the enemy without attempting to fight their way through with bayonets.

On 3 May 1831, the remnants of the regiment reached Brest-Litovsk, where the unit was gradually brought back up to strength with replacements from the 1st and 2nd Corps. Once reorganised, the regiment returned to active service and pursued the corps under Girolamo Ramorino into Galicia.

On 28 January 1833, as part of a general reorganisation of the infantry of the Imperial Russian Army, the regiment was reorganised into four battalions and, with the addition of the 2nd Battalion of the 48th Jaeger Regiment, was renamed the Lithuanian Jaeger Regiment.

=== 1840s: Caucasus ===
In 1841, the 2nd Battalion was sent to the Caucasus, where it was stationed along the Black Sea coast and took part in an expedition against the Ubykhs. On 22 January 1842, the battalion was transferred to the Separate Caucasian Corps, and a new 2nd Battalion was formed to replace it in the regiment.

On 8 January 1844, three battalions were sent to the Caucasus and assigned to guard the Georgian Military Road. That same year, the 1st Battalion took part in several expeditions in Little (Western) Chechnya against the Orstkhoy, who were resisting Russian rule. The battalion was repeatedly engaged in skirmishes with the mountain forces.

On 27 February 1845, a battalion of the Uglitsky Jaeger Regiment was attached to the Lithuanian Jaeger Regiment, becoming its 5th Battalion. Later that year, the 1st Battalion was assigned to the Chechen detachment and took part in the Dargo campaign. It distinguished itself at the Battle of Ichkeria and during the capture of the ruins near Gerzel-Aul. In recognition of its service during the campaign, the 1st Battalion received a new banner on 18 March 1846, bearing the inscription: "For the campaign to Andi in June and the capture of Dargo on July 6, 1845."

On 16 December 1845, the 2nd and 3rd Battalions were transferred to form the Kuban Jaeger Regiment. The Lithuanian Regiment consequently had four battalions.

=== Hungarian Revolution of 1848 ===
On 10 May 1849, during the Hungarian Revolution of 1848, the regiment campaigned in Transylvania and participated in a battle in the Oytuz gorge on July 11 during the Summer Campaign.

=== Crimean War (1853–1856) ===
In 1853, the 5th, 6th, 7th and 8th Reserve Battalions were formed with the regiment.

Assigned to reinforce the Russian forces in the Caucasus, the regiment sailed for the Black Sea coast on 17 September 1853. After landing at Sukhumi and Anaklia, it advanced into Transcaucasia.

The regiment fought the Ottoman forces along the Enguri River and near the village of Khorshi, distinguishing itself particularly in the battle across the Choloki River on 4 July 1854. During the battle, the 3rd Battalion launched a successful attack on a Turkish battery and captured six guns. In recognition of this action, the 3rd Battalion was awarded the St. George banner on 4 October 1854, bearing the inscription: "For distinction in the battle against the Turks across the Choloki River on June 4, 1854."

From 13 September 1854 to 27 August 1855, the regiment's 5th and 6th Reserve Battalions took part in the Siege of Sevastopol. For their courage during the siege, the regiment was awarded St. George banners on 30 August 1856, bearing the inscription "For Sevastopol in 1854 and 1855." The regiment's headgear was decorated with badges inscribed "For Sevastopol from 13 September 1854 to 27 August 1855." On 30 August 1856, the regiment was also awarded badges for its headgear bearing the inscription "For Distinction in 1854 and 1855."

On 17 April 1856, following the abolition of the Jaeger regiments, the Lithuanian Jaeger Regiment was redesignated as an infantry regiment. The reserve battalions were abolished that same year, and rifle companies were established in the four active battalions.

=== 1856–1859: Caucasus ===
For the next three years, the regiment took part in operations against the mountaineers of the Western Caucasus and was on several expeditions beyond the Kuban and in the Labinsky District. On 22 July 1859, the Lithuanian Infantry Regiment left the Caucasus.

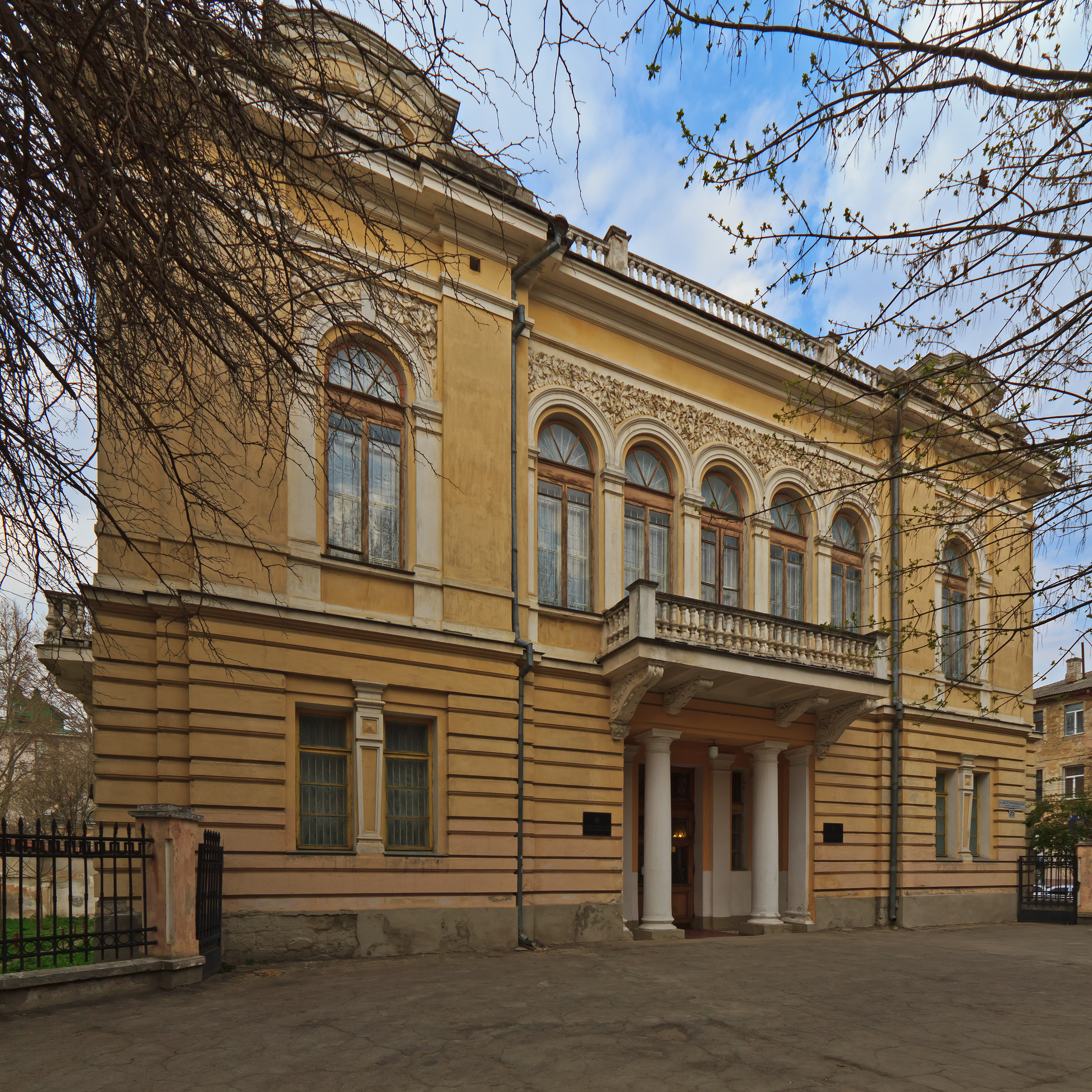
The 51st Lithuanian regiment's officers building in Simferopol

=== 1860s–1904 ===
On 6 April 1863, a regiment was formed from the Lithuanian Reserve Regiment's 4th Battalion and Reserve battalions. It was named the Putivl Infantry Regiment on 13 August 1863. On 25 March 1864, №51 was added to the regiment's name.

In the Russo-Turkish War (1877–1878), the regiment guarded Crimea's coasts. On 3 March 1877, the Lithuanian Regiment, together with the 52nd Vilnius Infantry Regiment, was in the Army of the South's 13th Division's 2nd Brigade. The two regiments were still brigaded in the 1880s.

On 14 May 1879, the 4th Battalion was formed from three rifle companies and the newly formed 16th Company. In the same year, the regiment was granted the military step of the Lithuanian Life Guards Regiment.

== 20th century ==
On 30 July 1904, the Grand Duke Alexei Nikolaevich, Tsarevich of Russia was appointed regimental chief, and the Lithuanian Regiment was ordered to be called the 51st Lithuanian Infantry Regiment of His Imperial Highness the Heir to the Tsarevich.

=== World War I ===
From 1914 to 8 December 1916, The Lithuanian regiment was part of the Southwestern Front. From then on, it was on the Romanian Front.

=== Russian Civil War ===
After 1918, many of the Lithuanian regiment's officers and even soldiers could not come to terms with the Bolshevik coup and took matters into their own hands. In June, the brother officers Rtishchevs (Pavel Rtishchev) from the regiment raised the first of the well-known "officer uprisings" (Stavropol Uprising) against the Communist government. In Simferopol, the Lithuanian regiment was revived and it actively participated in the Russian Civil War until 1920.

The 51st Lithuanian Infantry Regiment was revived within the Armed Forces of South Russia. Its officer cadre, composed largely of former officers who had been stationed in Crimea before World War I, was re-established in late 1918 in Simferopol as part of the Combined Regiment of the 13th Infantry Division. In September–October 1919, the cadre formed part of the division's 2nd Combined Regiment. Following the disbandment of the 13th Infantry Division, the Lithuanian Regiment was reorganised as an independent unit.

By 1 August 1920, the regiment had a strength of 142 men, was equipped with 11 machine guns and was commanded by Colonel Alexander Buyachenko.

== Regimental insignia ==
- Regimental St. George's banner with the inscription "For the campaign in Andi in June and the capture of Dargo on July 6, 1845 and for the difference in the battle against the Turks across the river. Cholokom June 4, 1854" and "1809-1909" with the Alexander's anniversary ribbon.
- Headwear insignia for lower ranks with the inscription "For Sevastopol from 13 September 1854 to 27 August 1855".

== Regimental chiefs ==
- 01/17/1811 - 09/01/1814 - Colonel (from 01/11/1814 - Major General) Baron Fedor Fedorovich Rosen.
- 07/30/1904 - XX.XX.1918 - the heir to the Tsarevich, Grand Duke Alexei Nikolaevich.

== Regiment's commanders ==
- 10/15/1811 - 03/17/1818 - Major (from 01/11/1814 Lieutenant Colonel) Boris Lukich Sergeyev
- 03/17/1818 - 02/28/1829 - lieutenant colonel (from 04/10/1820 Colonel) Mikhail Fedorovich Nikitin
- 04/01/1829 - 04/11/1831 - Colonel Mikhail Kurosh
- 06/12/1851 - 1855/1856 - Colonel Prince Lev Gagarin
- 02/17/1856 - 1859/1860 - Colonel Nikolai Chikhachev
- 1859/1860 - хх.хх. 1868/1869 - Colonel Pyotr Shafirov
- 08/02/1869 - 28/11/1874 - Colonel Pyotr Artsybashev
- 11/30/1874 - 12/17/1878 - Colonel Alexander Zashchuk
- xx.12.1878 - xx.01.1886 - Colonel Alexander Kalinin
- 01/19/1886 - 11/03/1887 - Colonel Konstantin Tserpitsky
- 11.11.1887 - 29.10.1892 - Colonel Giorgi Kazbegi
- 11/23/1892 - 07/16/1894 - Colonel Nikolai Grotenfeld
- 08/02/1894 - 04/17/1898 - Colonel Alexander Myagkov
- 06/02/1898 - 04/04/1901 - Colonel Ivan Kholodovsky
- 05/22/1901 - 02/06/1905 - Colonel Mikhail Nikulin
- 02.24.1905 - 03.24.1910 - Colonel Dmitry Cherepakhin-Ivaschenko
- 03.24.1910 - 01.03.1915 - Colonel Gavriil Alexandrovich Likhachev
- 01.24.1915 - 04.29.1915 - Colonel Alexey Tkachenko
- 04/29/1915 - 07/29/1915 - Colonel Vladimir Ivanovich Vadzinsky
- 08.24.1915 - 05.28.1916 - Colonel Ivan Tarbeev
- 05/31/1916 - 10/23/1916 - Colonel Mikhail Stakhov
- 12/14/1916 - 04/24/1917 - Colonel Konstantin Lisitsyn
- 05/27/1917 - xx.xx.xxxx - Colonel Bronislav-Evgeniy Pogorzhelsky

== Sources ==
- Pavlyuk, K. K. (1909). История 51-го пехотного Литовского ... полка [History of the 51st Lithuanian infantry regiment] (in Russian). Vol. 1, 2. Odessa. Archived from the original on 25 February 2016.
- Gizetti, A.L. (1896), Хроника Кавказских войск [Chronicle of the Caucasian Troops] (in Russian), Tbilisi: Типографйя Штаба Кавказскаго военнаго округа [Printing House of the Headquarters of the Caucasian Military District]
- Gabaev, G.S. (1912), Роспись русским полкам 1812 года [List of Russian regiments in 1812] (in Russian), Kyiv: тип. Окружного Штаба [District Headquarters Printing House]
- Novitsky, Vasily Fedorovich. Военная энциклопедия [Military encyclopedia] (in Russian).
- Chennyk, S. (2014). 51-й пехотный Литовский полк – на службе пяти императорам [51st Lithuanian Infantry Regiment - in the service of five emperors]. mil.sevhome.ru (in Russian).
- antologifo (2018). Историческая справка по 51-му пехотному Литовскому полку [Historical information on the 51st Lithuanian Infantry Regiment]. www.antologifo.narod.ru. Archived from the original on 28 January 2019.

== See also ==
- 51st Lithuanian Regiment's uniform from 1904
