= Wojciech Chrzanowski =

Polish general (1793–1861)

General Wojciech Chrzanowski
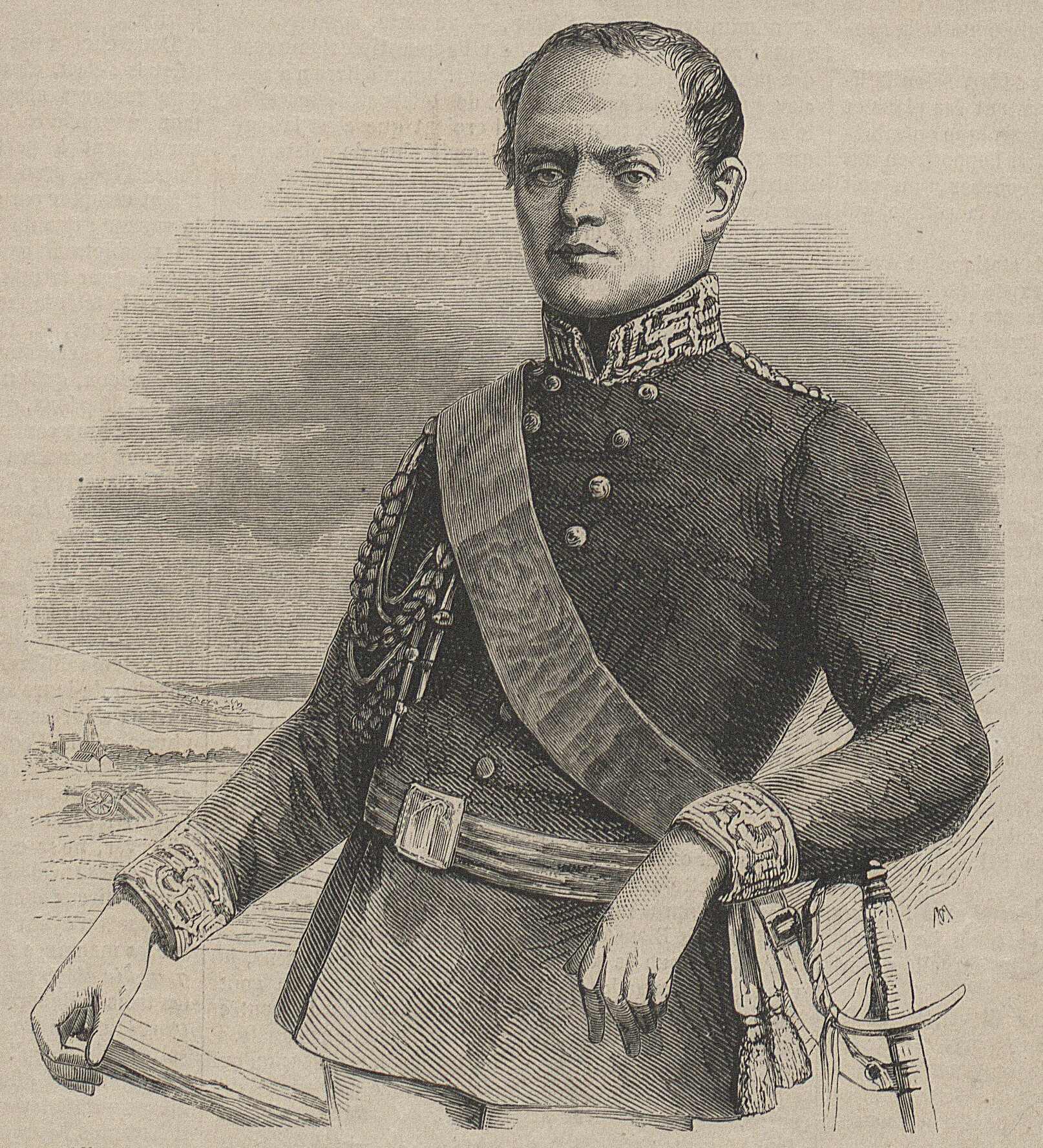
- Wojciech Chrzanowski during the battle of Novara, 1849.
- Born: 14 January 1793; Gmina Biskupice, Poland
- Died: 26 February 1861 (aged 68) Paris, France
- Buried: Montmartre Cemetery, Paris
- Allegiance: Duchy of Warsaw; Congress Poland; Kingdom of Sardinia
- Branch: Warsaw Army; Congress Army; Sardinian Army
- Service years: 1810–1849
- Rank: Second lieutenant Colonel; General
- Conflicts: Napoleonic Wars; Battle of Smolensk; Battle of Leipzig; Battle of Paris; Battle of Waterloo; Russo-Turkish War; November uprising; First Battle of Wawer; Battle of Dębe Wielkie; Battle of Warsaw; First Italian War of Independence; Battle of Novara
- Awards: Virtuti Militari
- Other work: Writer, cartographer

Wojciech Chrzanowski (14 January 1793 – 26 February 1861) was a Polish general who participated in Napoleon's Russian campaign and in the battles of Leipzig, Paris, and Waterloo. After Napoleon's final defeat he served in the national army of Poland, and served in the Imperial Russian Army under Hans Karl von Diebitsch against the Ottoman Empire in 1828/29. He was awarded the Knight's Cross of the Order of Virtuti Militari.

Chrzanowski was born on 14 January 1793 in Biskupice. He was made Governor of Warsaw in 1831. He was suspected of being untrustworthy in his conduct with the Russians and was shunned by many of the people, emigrating to Paris at the end of 1831.

In 1841 he was in the service of the British government. Lord Palmerston sent him to assist the Ottoman military reforms, acting as a British military attaché in the field.

Charles Albert, King of Sardinia, called Chrzanowski after the armistice that concluded the 1848 campaign of the First Italian War of Independence as Chief of Staff of the Piedmontese army; this caused friction in the ranks, as he was largely seen as the King's creature, and his figure and attitude did not command much respect. After Eusebio Bava was removed as General in Chief, he was officially named Generale maggiore (Major general, not a rank but a title for the head of staff) for the upcoming campaign (although de facto he would lead the army). The 1849 campaign was however a complete failure, as he was outmaneuvered and defeated by Josef Radetzky in the Battle of Novara. General Girolamo Ramorino was blamed for the defeat, and subsequently executed; however Chrzanowski did not escape censure and was dismissed from Sardinian service. He lived for a time in Louisiana but died in Paris (26 February 1861). He published several works in Polish.

== Publications ==
- Chesney, Russo-Turkish Campaigns of 1828–29
- Piero Pieri, Storia Militare del Risorgimento, 1962, Giulio Einaudi Editore, Torino
