= Stoczek Łukowski =

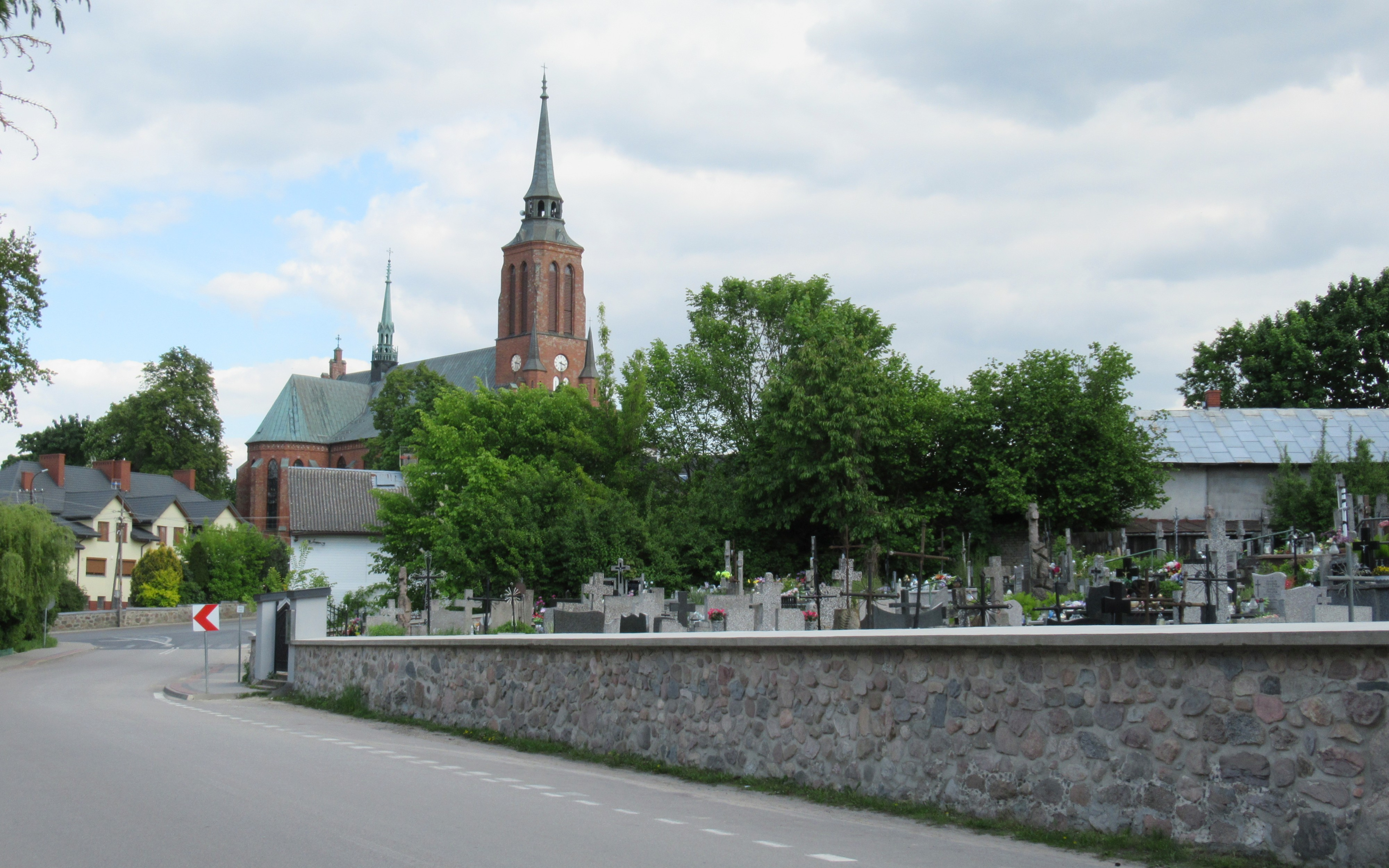
- Local church and cemetery

- Coat of arms

- Location within Poland
- Coordinates: 51°58′N 21°58′E
- Country: Poland
- Voivodeship: Lublin
- Powiat: Łuków
- Gmina: Stoczek Łukowski (urban gmina)
- First mentioned: 13th century
- Town rights: 1546

Government
  - Mayor: Marcin Sentkiewicz (PiS)

Area
  - Total: 9.15 km^{2} (3.53 sq mi)

Population (2006)
  - Total: 2,719
  - Density: 297/km^{2} (770/sq mi)
- Time zone: UTC+1 (CET)
  - Summer (DST): UTC+2 (CEST)
- Postal code: 21-450
- Car plates: LLU
- Website: http://www.stoczek-lukowski.pl

Stoczek Łukowski [ˈstɔt͡ʂɛk wuˈkɔfskʲi] is a town in Łuków County, in Lublin Voivodeship, in eastern Poland with 2,556 inhabitants (as of January 2018). The town is located upon the Świder River.

== History ==
Stoczek Łukowski was first mentioned in the 13th century. On 4 April 1546, it was granted town charter by King Sigismund I the Old.

Stoczek Łukowski belongs to the historic province of Mazovia, in which it was part of the Land of Czersk. In the 15th century, it was property of Bishops of Poznań, and was named "Wola Poznańska". In the 16th century documents, it was also called "Sebastianowo", probably after Bishop of Poznań Sebastian Branicki. Current name came into use in the 17th century.

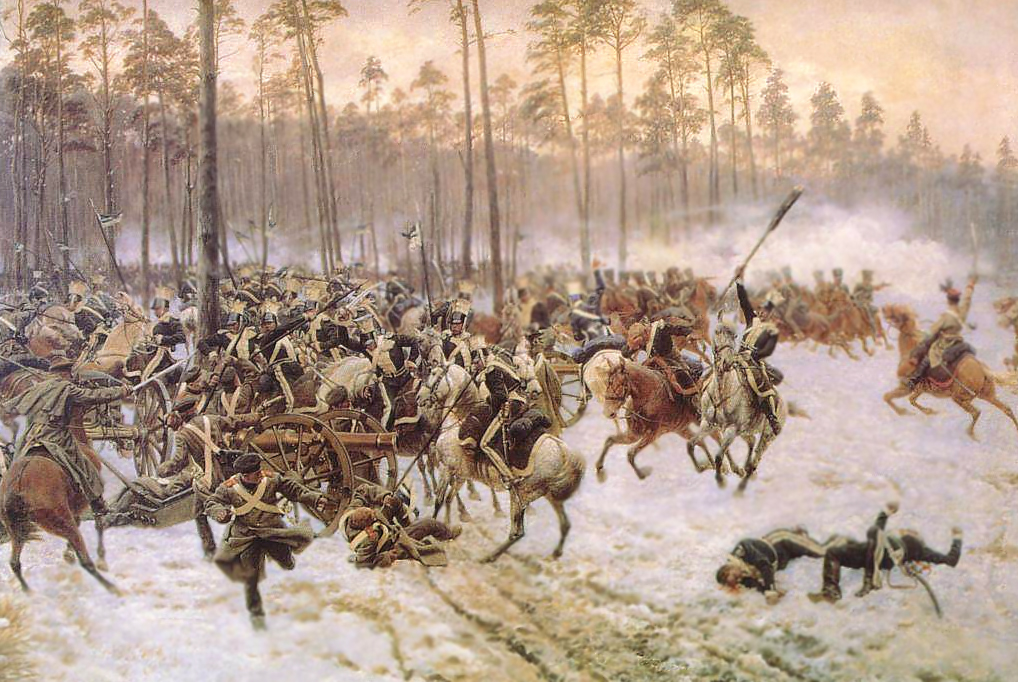
Battle of Stoczek (1831), on a 1890 painting by Jan Rosen

Following the Third Partition of Poland in 1795, the town was annexed by Austria. After the Polish victory in the Austro-Polish War of 1809, it was included within the short-lived Duchy of Warsaw. Following the duchy's dissolution in 1815, it became part of Russian-controlled Congress Poland. During the November Uprising, the Battle of Stoczek took place there on 14 February 1831, in which Polish insurgents defeated the Russians. On 18 January 1849, Aleksander Świętochowski was born in Stoczek. Another famous person born here is Bishop Adolf Piotr Szelążek. Stoczek was one of main centers of the January Uprising, for which in 1867 it was stripped of town charter, and remained a village until 1916.

Following the invasion of Poland, which started World War II, the town was occupied by Germany until 1944. In the fall of 1941, an unfenced ghetto was established, housing approximately 3,500 Jews from Stoczek Łukowski and nearby villages. In August 1942, the ghetto was liquidated and the people staying there were deported to the Parysów ghetto, and from there to the Treblinka extermination camp.

== Notable residents ==
- Aleksander Świętochowski (1849–1938), writer, educator, and philosopher
