= Battle of Iganie =

Battle of the Polish November Uprising

Coordinates: 52°10′02″N 22°12′38″E

- Part of Polish–Russian War 1830–1831
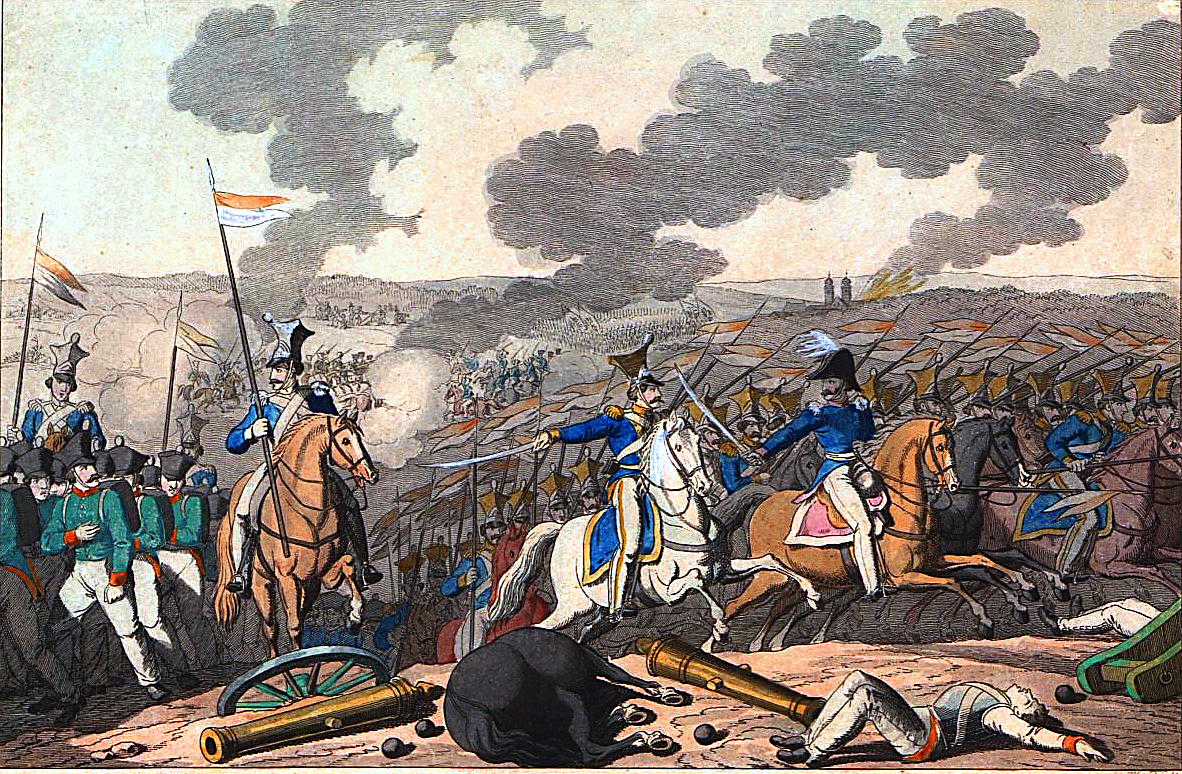
Date	10 April 1831
Location	Iganie near Siedlce, Poland
Result	Polish victory

Belligerents
Kingdom of Poland	(Russia) Russian Empire

Commanders and leaders
Ignacy Prądzyński; Ludwik Kicki	(Russia) Grigory Rosen (Russia) Teodor Geismar

Strength
22,000 men, 32 cannons (Note: 4,000 men, 16 cannons (Note: participated?))	24,000 men, 42 cannons (Note: 11,000 men, 28 cannons (Note: participated?))

Casualties and losses
400 to 1,500 killed or wounded	4,000 to 5,000 killed or wounded

The Battle of Iganie was fought on 10 April 1831 between Russian and Polish forces. It was one of the last major battles of the November Uprising and the last major offensive for the Poles.

== Background ==
Following the battle of Grochów of 25 February, the Russian advance under General Hans Karl von Diebitsch through Praga did not occur, and he decided to cross Vistula river south of the city trying to take it "from land". The Poles, numbering some 4,000 men (both bayonets and sabres) and 16 cannons advanced rapidly towards the town of Siedlce, a major Russian munitions depot. On 10 April 1831 the Poles encountered forces of Gen. Grigorij Rosen in the village of Iganie, several miles west of Siedlce, at the Muchawka river.

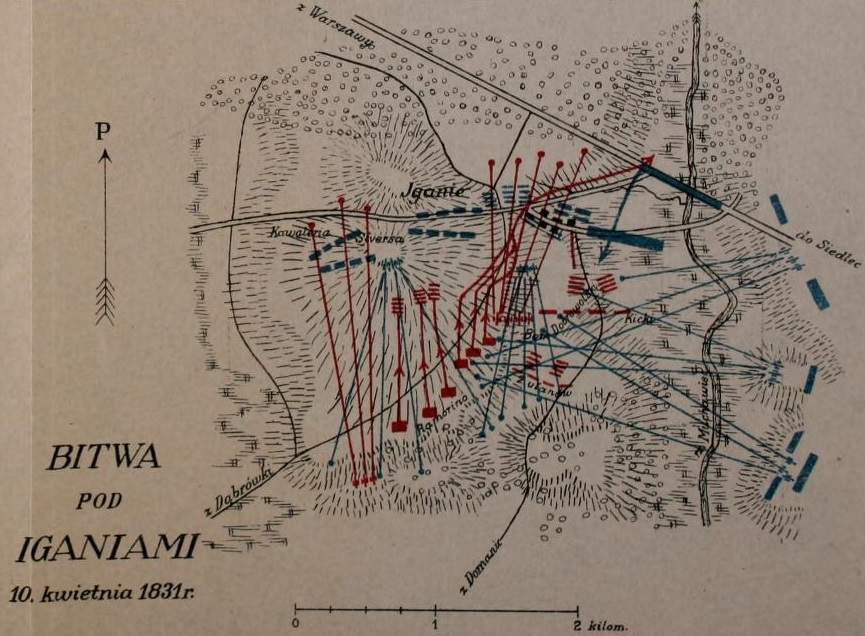
Map of the battle

== Description ==
Prądzyński, believing the remainder of the Polish forces would arrive shortly, decided to assault the Russians with his avant garde only. The mounted artillery units under Gen. Józef Bem took advantage of its mobility and successfully shelled the village of Iganie defended by Russian infantry. This allowed for the Polish infantry led by Prądzyński himself to recapture the village. After the initial surprise, the Russian forces under General Geismar managed to regroup across the river and started shelling the Poles with their artillery, much superior in numbers. Seeing the numerical inferiority of the Poles, the Russian commander ordered the artillery barrage to stop and the infantry to charge the Polish positions from across the river. However, shortly after the Russians entered the combat, the combined forces of Prądzyński's infantry and Gen. Ludwik Kicki's cavalry managed to cut the Russians from their rear and seize the sole bridge above the river. Due to Russia superiority in fire power the success was short-living, although Poles managed to inflict heavy casualty on Rosen's Observational Corps. Rosen, who arrived back from his meeting with Diebitsch in the middle of the battle, ordered Geismar to continue with commanding the troops.

== Aftermath ==
The Polish commander in chief General Jan Skrzynecki who arrived at the battlefield later that day opposed the idea of another push on Russian forces, thus Poles for the second time after the Battle of Dębe Wielkie did not achieve their main objective — to cut Diebitsch's main supply lines, and because of that the Polish effort was somewhat useless.
