= Second battle of Wawer =

Battle of the Polish November Uprising

- Part of November Uprising
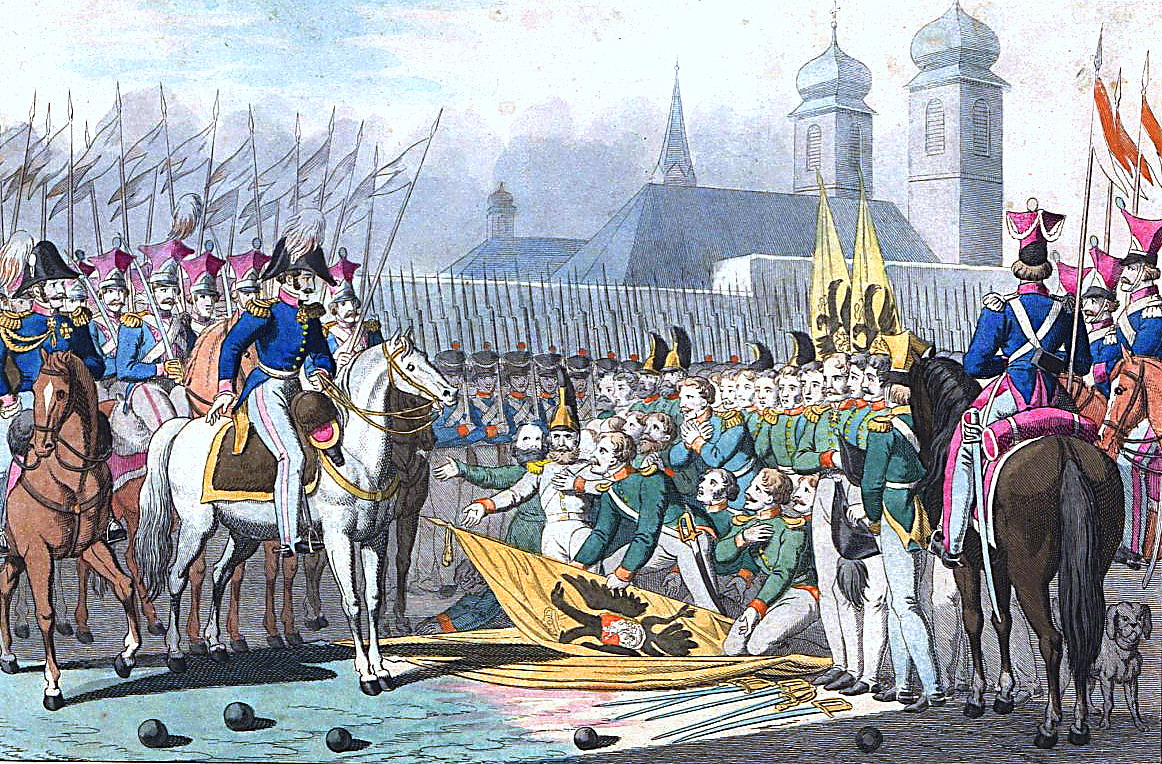
- Russian flags captured during the second battle of Wawer being laid in front of Polish command
Date	31 March 1831
Location	Wawer
Result	Polish victory

Belligerents
Poland	Imperial Russia

Commanders and leaders
Ignacy Prądzyński	Fyodor Gejsmar

Strength
15 battalions, 8 squadrons, 14 cannons	6 battalions, 6 squadrons, 7 sotnia, 10 cannon

Casualties and losses
Unknown	Significant

The second battle of Wawer (Polish: druga bitwa pod Wawrem) was an armed engagement between Polish and Imperial Russian troops. It happened on 31 March 1831 during the November Uprising and was one of the first battles of a successful Polish offensive planned by General Ignacy Prądzyński. On 31 March, during the period of the Polish operational initiative along the Siedlce road, the Polish grouping nominally commanded by General Jan Skrzynecki (15 battalions, 8 squadrons, 14 cannons) fought a victorious battle with the Russian corps of General Fyodor Gejsmar (6 battalions, 6 squadrons, 7 sotnia, 10 cannons). The lack of vigorous pursuit meant that the Russians, despite significant losses, managed to maintain combat value. An earlier clash in the same area occurred on 20 February 1831. The Polish success led to another victorious battle of Dębe Wielkie later that day.

== See also ==
- First battle of Wawer
