= Battle of Stoczek =

Battle of the Polish November Uprising

Coordinates: 51.9667°N 21.9667°E

- Part of Polish-Russian War 1830-1831
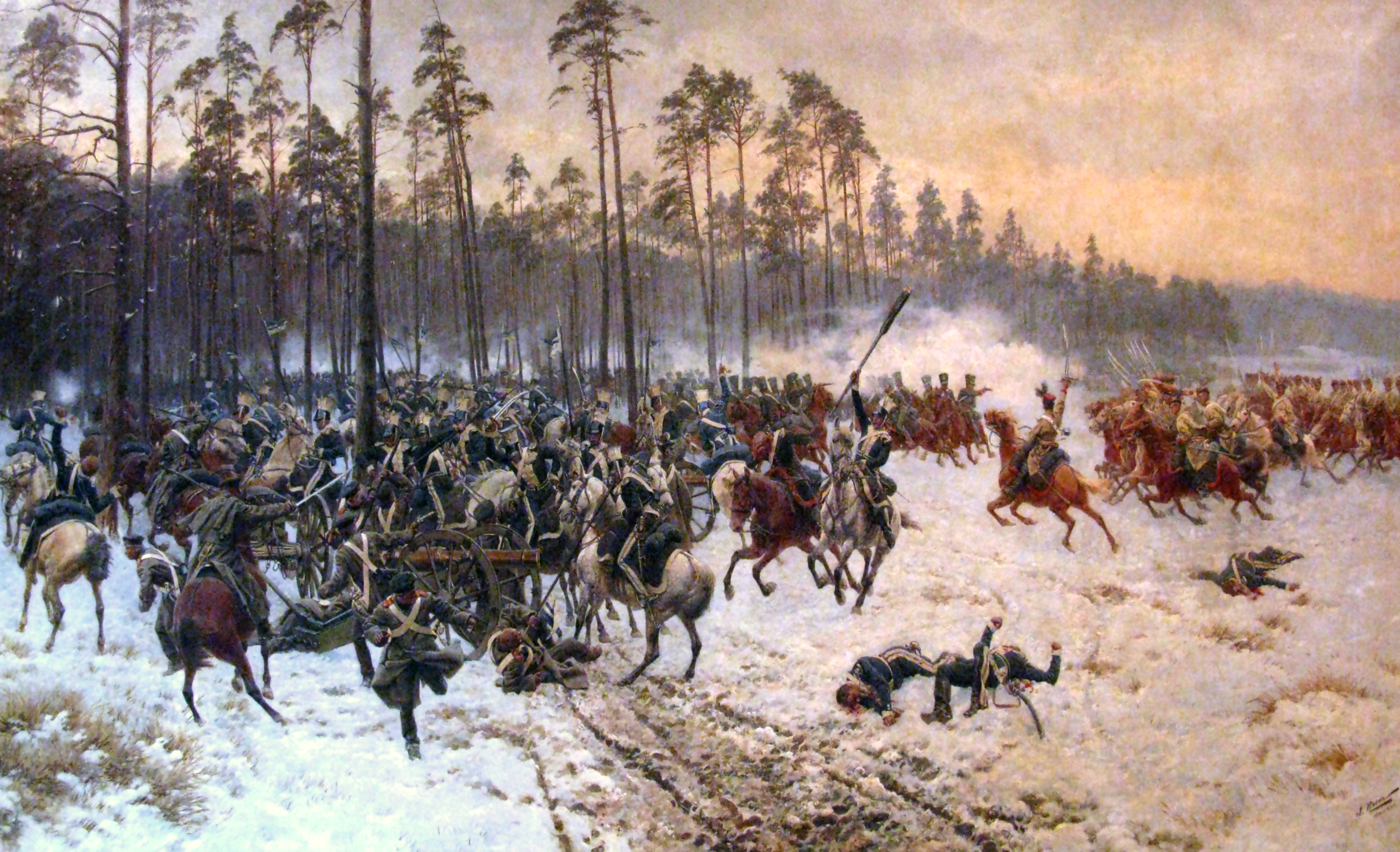
- Battle of Stoczek by Jan Rosen
Date	14 February 1831
Location	East of Warsaw, Poland
Result	Polish victory

Belligerents
Poland	Imperial Russia

Commanders and leaders
(Poland) Józef Dwernicki	(Russia) Teodor Geismar

Strength
4,700 (2,200 cavalry)	2,100 (100 artillery men)

Casualties and losses
46 killed, 59 wounded	Some 280 killed, 230 taken captive, 8 cannon lost

The Battle of Stoczek was the first significant engagement between Russian and Polish forces during the Polish November Uprising. It took place on 14 February 1831 near the town of Stoczek Łukowski, near the Brest–Warsaw road. The Polish forces drove off two regiments of Russian mounted Jaegers, inflicting heavy casualties on them in the process.

== Background ==
The Russian Army, commanded by Field Marshal Hans Karl von Diebitsch, entered Poland on 4 February and started an advance towards Warsaw. He also sent a mounted Jaeger division—2 brigades of 2 regiments, each consisting of 3 troops of 2 squadrons—into Poland on 13 February, with some 20 10-pounder guns of field artillery attached. Baron Teodor Geismar had assumed command of this detachment just 9 days earlier-a seasoned commander who had defended Russia during its invasion in 1812 at the hands of Napoleon Bonaparte, as well as fighting for Prussia during the earlier War of the Third Coalition, wherein his unit was destroyed during the Battle of Austerlitz, inspiring him to join the Russian Imperial Army.

Field Marshal Diebitsch's strategy involved sending Geismar's Corps to outflank any numerically inferior Polish forces while he advanced towards Warsaw with great speed from the direction of Lublin. This left a large gap between him and Geismar, however, who was approaching Warsaw with his troops along the Brest Road.

The Polish forces in the area managed to amass a division of 14 Uhlan squadrons-light cavalry armed with lances, sabres and pistols-, 3 infantry battalions and 6 3-pounder guns. Their commander was Brigadier General Józef Dwernicki-a veteran of the Polish-Austrian War who, incidentally, had fought for Napoleon during the French invasion of Russia and the Battle of Leipzig, during which time Napoleon himself had personally awarded Dwernicki the Golden Cross of the Legion of Honour for his service (it's unknown whether or not Baron Geismar knew of this.) With approximately 4,700 men at arms including 2,200 cavalrymen, Dwernicki crossed the Vistula River on 10 February.

On the noon of February the 14th, Geismar received some information regarding the presence of the Polish troops near the town of Stoczek, deciding to launch an immediate attack and taking direct command of his 1st Brigade. Geismar left his 2nd Brigade, made up primarily of mounted Jaeger Regiments from Arzamas and Tiraspol, including the Riga Dragoon Regiment of Duke Alexander of Württemberg, behind as support troops with half of his division's artillery (10 guns).

The then-CO major of Geismar's 1st Brigade was General Pashkov, whom Geismar put in supreme command of another mounted Jaeger regiment from Pereyaslavl, organised into 3 Troops, and gave 4 guns. Pashkov was to approach Stoczek from north-east, while Geismar took his own cavalry and the remaining 6 guns on an eastern road to the town. The forested terrain forced their troops to march down narrow woodland roads, and further separated the Russian forces.

Dwernicki kept a strong watch despite already having settled his forces for the night, and was informed by fellow Poles of the approaching Russians well in advance. Dwernicki took his troops out to the field north of Stoczek, putting his guns in-line from east to west and his infantry in square formations on the flanks, one leaning on the thick forest to the west of his position. He then divided his Uhlans and sent them out to the south and north of his line, covering all and any directions the enemy might approach from. The large gap between Field Marshal Diebitsch and Geismar's troops had resulted in a loss of contact between the two, meaning the Field Marshal would be unable to cover Geismar's cavalry or artillery should it come under attack. Dwernicki, already a seasoned commander, utilised this, as well as the darkness and cover of the forest, to set an ambush.

== Battle ==
Pashkov's Pereyaslavl Regiment was the first to reach the field, arriving from the north-east in the early twilight hours, and immediately came under fire from Dwernicki's artillery. Pashkov put his guns in-line under the shelling and dismounted the 1st Troop of Jaegers to protect them from the Polish cavalry, then ordered the 2nd Troop to engage the northern detachment of Dwernicki's Uhlans. When the Russian and Polish cavalry met, the 2nd Troop retreated toward Geismar's position almost immediately. The 3rd Troop, still mounted, followed, leaving Pashkov and his 1st Troop at the mercy of the Polish Uhlans. This initial clash was over so quickly that General Pashkov's artillery hadn't yet returned fire.

By the time Geismar arrived from the east, Dwernicki's cavalry was approaching his position. Unaware of the fate of Pashkov's troops, Geismar put his guns in-line facing north and prepared to send his Regiment's own Mounted Jaegers into battle, but was then met with Pashkov's retreating 2nd and 3rd Troops, who were caught between Geismar's forces and the advancing Polish Uhlans, slowing Geismar's counterattack.

Morale was already waning amongst Geismar's cavalry when he finally sent them into battle, and they too were routed by the Polish cavalry. Having been taken completely by surprise, and deeply shocked by the cowardice of his soldiers, Geismar attempted to take personal command of the retreating cavalry, but the battle was already lost. The retreating Russians left Baron Geismar and some of his officers at the field, who were pursued by the invigorated Polish cavalry.

== Aftermath ==
=== Poles ===
General Pashkov had managed to return fire despite his initial losses, and Geismar's forces had put up somewhat of a fight, resulting in 46 Polish soldiers killed and 59 wounded-nowhere near the Russian losses. The Polish celebrated the victory, alongside which they had achieved the honour of being the first in history to rout Russian regular cavalry regiments, with some Russians 280 killed, 230 taken prisoner and 8 Russian cannons lost.

The battle of Stoczek was the first Polish victory during the November Uprising, and had a tremendous effect on Polish morale. A week-long celebration complete with firework displays was held in Warsaw, the ecstatic Poles particularly parroting the fact that Dwernicki had defeated Geismar, celebrated by the Russians as their then-greatest vanguard commander and a veteran and war hero of the Russo-Turkish War (1828–29).

Despite all of this, and despite Field Marshal Diebitsch's later defeat by Polish General Jan Skrzynecki at the Battle of Wawer, the Polish victory at Stoczek did little to slow the Russian advance towards Warsaw.

=== Russians ===
Geismar and General Pashkov survived the attack, perhaps purely by chance, and Geismar himself officially wrote to Field Marshal Diebitsch that his soldiers were "just struck with a sudden panic-attack", but expressed great concern in a private letter to his friend Colonel Anrep regarding the general moral and military capability of the Regiment. Geismar bitterly described a waning faith in the virtues of the Russian Soldier and army, which Geismar had admired until that day, and reported that he had vastly overestimated the moral of his troops-"If I would only have been aware of the moral state of my men at the time I launched the operation—surely, I wouldn't dare to attack Dwernicki's troops at all, not to discuss 'in such a position.".

The battle of Stoczek would become known as Geismar's greatest military mistake, and Anrep himself soon after took charge of Geismar's mounted Jaeger Regiment. Tzar Nicholas I of Russia disbanded mounted Jaegers as the primary form of cavalry in the Russian Imperial Army in 1883, and soldiers fitting said description were sent to other cavalry regiments in accordance with the hue of their horses.

== Literature ==
- Memoire of General Baron Theodore Geismar and comments on them. Vladimir Geismar. Russkaya Starina (Old Times in Russia) - 1881, book 5; 1882, book 1 (in Russian Old Spelling).
