= Ignacy Prądzyński =

Polish military commander and engineer

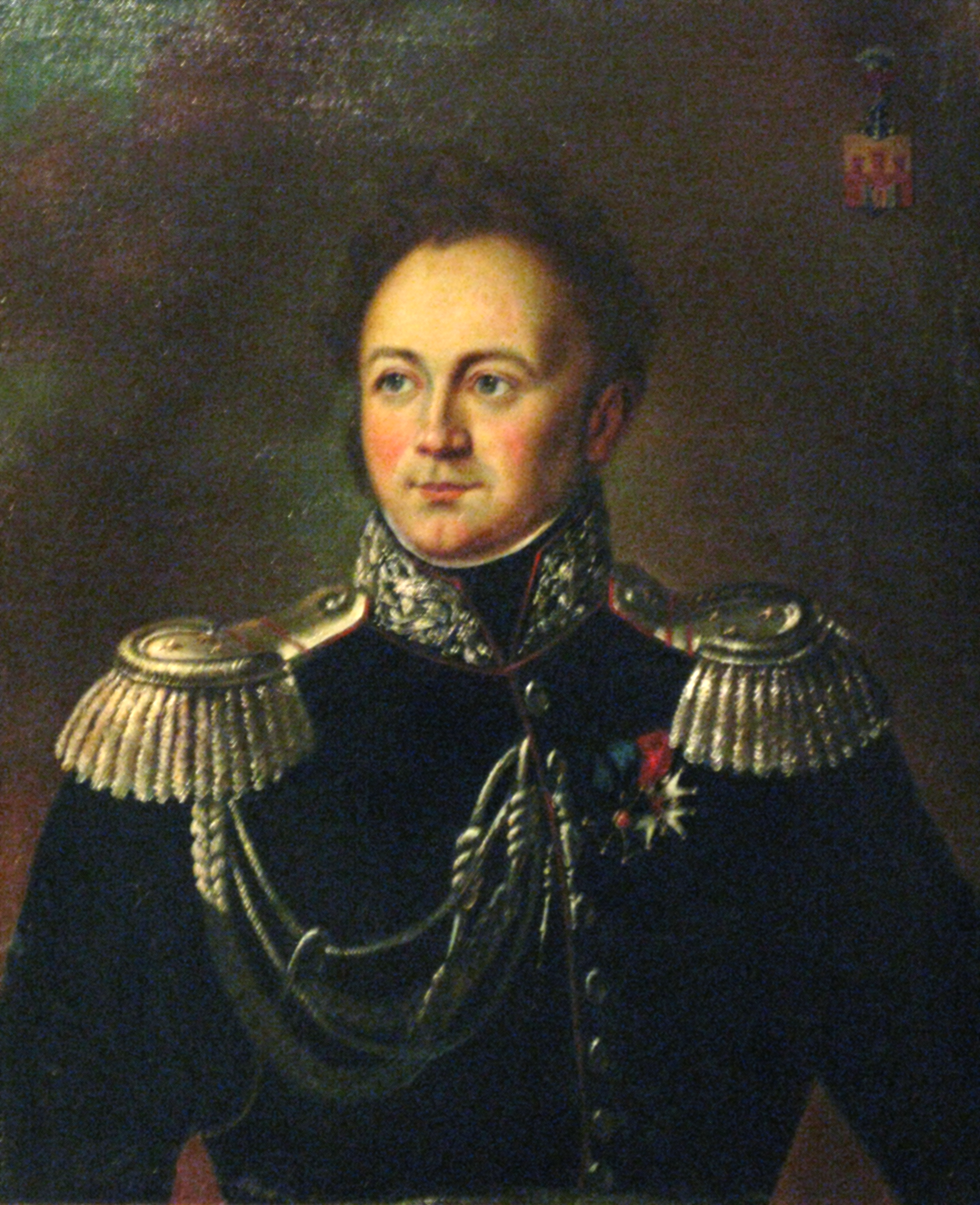
- Born: Ignacy Pantaleon Prądzyński; July 20, 1792; Sanniki
- Died: August 4, 1850 (aged 58); Heligoland
- Education: Warsaw University of Technology
- Occupations: military leader, engineer
- Known for: Construction of the Augustów Canal
- Awards: Golden Cross of the War Order Virtuti Militari; Knight of Legion of Honour; Order of Saint Anna

Ignacy Prądzyński (Polish pronunciation: [iɡˈnatsɨ prɔnˈdzɨj̃skʲi]; 20 July 1792– 4 August 1850) was a Polish military commander, general of the Polish Army and an engineer. A veteran of the Napoleonic Wars, he was one of the most successful Polish commanders of the November Uprising against Russia. He is also notable for constructing the Augustów Canal.

== Life and military career ==
Ignacy Prądzyński was born on July 20, 1792, in the village of Sanniki in Greater Poland. In November 1807 he joined the army of the Duchy of Warsaw and quickly advanced through its ranks. During the Napoleonic Wars he took part in the campaigns of 1809 (Polish–Austrian War) and the campaign against Russia between 1812 and 1814. For his bravery in the latter campaign he was awarded with the Golden Cross of the Virtuti Militari and the French Legion of Honour for his role in the Battle of Leipzig and the Battle of Waterloo.

After the Russian takeover of Poland he remained in Warsaw, though he did not join the army. In 1815 he founded a secret anti-Russian Association of True Poles and later collaborated with the Patriotic Society. Arrested by the Russian police in 1826, he spent 3 years in prisons. Upon his release, he started working as an engineer. Among the most notable of his projects was the Augustów Canal, linking Vistula with the Baltic Sea through the basin of the Neman River.

After the outbreak of the November Uprising he again joined the Polish Army. Initially an advisor to Gen. Michał Gedeon Radziwiłł, he also served as a General Quartermaster, Chief of Engineering Corps and de facto chief of staff of the army. After the Battle of Iganie, in which he achieved a brilliant victory, he was nominated by the government for the post of the commander in chief of the uprising, Prądzyński was forced to resign by Jan Krukowiecki and Henryk Dembiński. Instead, on August 19, 1831, he was promoted to the rank of General of Division.

In September he prepared the plans for the defense of Warsaw. However, the commanders of the Uprising lacked will to continue the fight and his plans were not accepted. Appointed to the Polish commission negotiating the capitulation, Prądzyński suffered from a nervous breakdown and surrendered to the Russians. Forcibly resettled to Viatka, in 1833 he was allowed to return to Poland, where he continued his work as a theoretician of military strategy and tactics. Author of roughly 60 works on theory of warfare, he was one of the most notable Polish military writers of the 19th century.

During the Hungarian Revolution of 1848, the Hungarian revolutionaries invited him to command the Hungarian Revolutionary Army, but he refused. Suffering from serious illnesses, in 1850 he moved to the island of Helgoland, where he drowned on August 4, 1850, probably committing suicide.

== Honours and awards ==
- Gold Cross of the Virtuti Militari
- Knight of the Legion of Honour
- Order of St. Anna, 2nd class with diamonds
