= Georg Andreas von Rosen =

Baltic German army general (1782–1841)

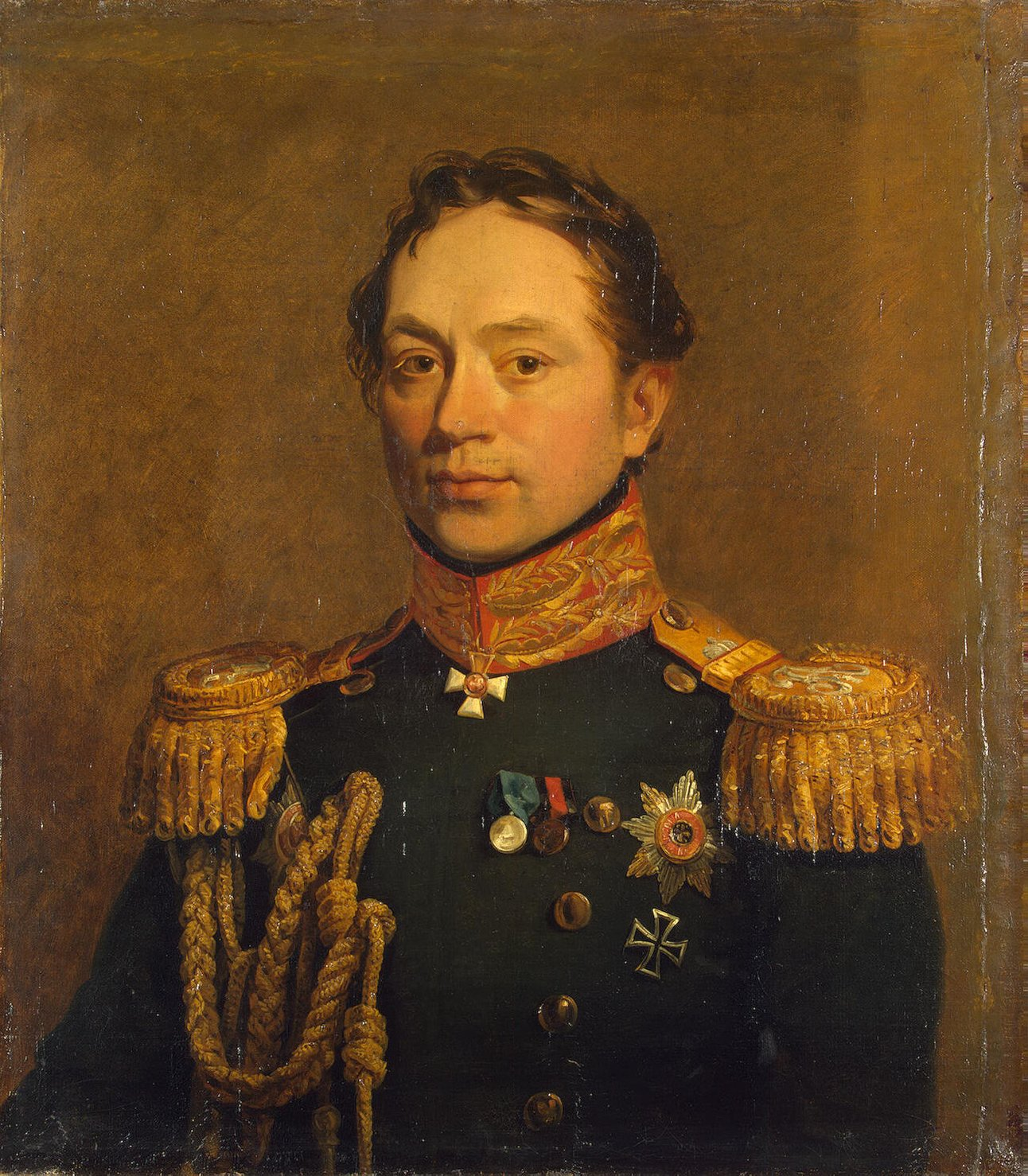
Portrait by George Dawe, from the Military Gallery of the Winter Palace (1820–1825)

Baron Georg Andreas von Rosen (Grigory Vladimirovich Rosen; Russian: Григорий Владимирович Розен, romanized: Grigory Vladimirovich Rozen; 1782–1841) was a general in the Russian Imperial Army who served as the de facto viceroy of the Caucasus from 1831 to 1837. He was one of the key figures of the Caucasian War.

== Life ==
A baron (Freiherr) of Baltic German ancestry (his father was Vladimir Ivanovich Rosen and his mother was Olimpiada Fyodorovna Raevskaya), he was formally enlisted in the army at the age of seven. He took part in the Napoleonic Wars, the Finnish War, fought at Borodino and served with Russian forces all the way to Paris. Promoted to major general in 1809, he quickly rose through the ranks and in 1826 was promoted to a full general of infantry rank.

Rosen was designated the commanding officer of the 6th Lithuanian Corps in 1827. He was thrust into prominence by the Uprising of 1831, participated at Wawer, and acted decisively at Grochów, winning the tsar's admiration. The outcome of skirmishes at Iganie and at Międzyrzec Podlaski was less certain (though Rosen was actually absent from the army when the Iganie skirmish began).

In 1831, he succeeded Ivan Paskevich as commander in chief of the Caucasus Army and remained in charge of the vast area stretching from Astrakhan to Yerevan (including all of Georgia) until 1837. In this capacity he neutralized the 1832 Georgian plot and eliminated the threat of Ghazi Muhammad (whom he besieged at his native village of Gimry). In the same year he took part in assault on Germenchuk. He also forced Shamil to leave Avaria for two years. He suffered a debilitating stroke in 1839. Rosen died in Moscow and was buried in the Danilov Monastery.

Baron Rosen married Countess Elizaveta Zubova in 1812. She was Platon Zubov's niece. Their daughter Praskovia became a nun under the name of Mitrophania and was in charge of the Vladychny Convent between 1861 and 1874. A domineering and highly influential person, she was arrested for faking promissory notes and, after a highly publicized trial, was sentenced to exile in Siberia. Alexander Ostrovsky based his play Wolves and Sheep on his impressions of attending the court proceedings in 1874.

== Sources ==
- "Розен, Григорий Владимирович" . Brockhaus and Efron Encyclopedic Dictionary (in Russian). 1906.
