= Battle of Dębe Wielkie =

Part of the Polish November Uprising (March 1831)

Coordinates: 52°30′18″N 21°36′11″E

- Part of Polish–Russian War 1830–1831
Date	31 March 1831
Location	Dębe Wielkie near Warsaw, Poland
Result	Polish tactical victory

Belligerents
Poland	Imperial Russia

Commanders and leaders
(Poland) Jan Skrzynecki	(Russia) Geismar

Strength
40,000 all, 116 canons	13,000 infantry, 5,000 cavalry, 49 canons

Casualties and losses
Unknown	2,500 dead, 3,000 captured

The Battle of Dębe Wielkie was fought on 17 March 1831. The Polish army, led by Jan Skrzynecki, won over Russian curtain forces commanded by General Geismar.

== Background ==
Following the battle of Grochów of 25 February, the Russian advance under General Hans Karl von Diebitsch through Praga did not occur, and he decided to cross Vistula river south of the city trying to take it "from land".

== Battle ==
The Poles, numbering some 40,000 men (both bayonets and sabres) and 116 cannons on March 31, 1831 advanced from Praga on the nearby standing Russian vanguard under General Geismar and attacked it. Maneuvering and retreating all day, Geismar went to the village of Debe Wielkie by 4 p.m. Russian force was almost finished but arrival of three fresh regiments allowed Geismar to get out of trouble and take hold at the town of Siedlce.

== Aftermath ==
Although Poles gained some ground and inflicted heavy casualties on Russians, they did not manage to achieve their main goal – to finish Rosen's Observation Corps and expose Diebitsch's line of supply. Furthermore the Russian Army was described as " almost cut to pieces".

== Literature ==
Memoire of baron Geismar published by Vladimir Geismar and comments on them. "Russkaya Starina" – 1881, book 5; 1882, book 1.
