= Jan Rosen =

Polish painter

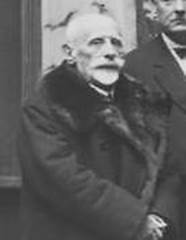
Jan Rosen (1928, detail from a group photograph)

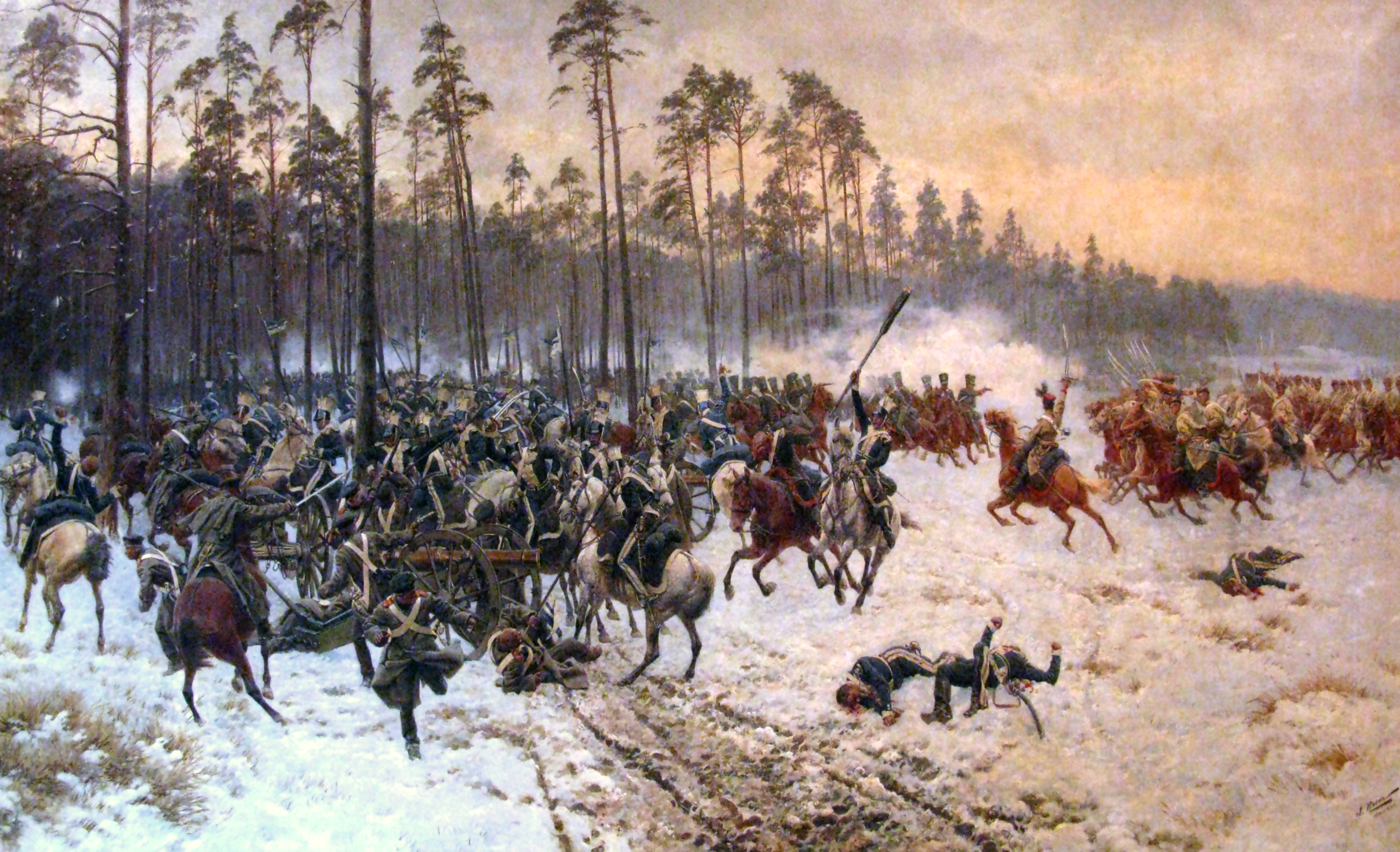
The Battle of Stoczek

Jan Bogumił Rosen (16 October 1854 – 8 November 1936) was a Polish painter known primarily for his battle scenes. His son was the muralist and mosaicist, Jan Henryk de Rosen.

== Biography ==
He was born in Warsaw to a wealthy Jewish family that had converted to Calvinism. Later, he became a Lutheran. He displayed an early talent for drawing and received his first lessons from Franciszek Kostrzewski.

From 1872 to 1875, he studied at the Academy of Fine Arts, Munich, then took private lessons at the school of battle painter Józef Brandt. His next four years were spent at the Académie des Beaux-Arts in Paris with Jean-Léon Gérôme and Isidore Pils.

He lived successively in Munich, Paris and Lausanne then, having a wife and newborn son to support, he settled in Russia in 1891, where he became a court painter to Alexander III; after the Tsar purchased his painting of Grand Duke Konstantin Pavlovich reviewing the Polish cavalry. In 1907 he made a trip to North Africa, followed by a visit to Scandinavia in 1908. He did not return to Poland until 1921, after the Polish-Soviet War. He died in 1936 in Warsaw.

He is best known for battle scenes, especially from the Napoleonic Wars, but also did several works on the November Uprising prior to and after his residency in Russia. Horses were among his favorite motifs and he was known for the attention he paid to precise details in his uniforms and weapons. Some critics, however, thought his paintings were only good for teaching history.
