= Girolamo Ramorino =

Italian general (1792–1849)

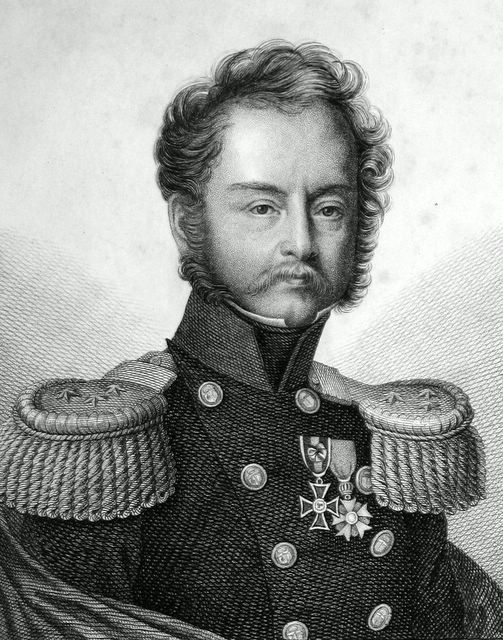
- Born: 8 April 1792; Genoa, Republic of Genoa
- Died: 22 May 1849 (aged 57)

General Girolamo Ramorino (8 April 1792 – 22 May 1849) was born in Genoa, Republic of Genoa. He was notable for being a high ranking officer for several different nations during the 19th century.

== Career ==
Girolamo would serve the French Army during the Napoleonic Wars, he fought under Napoleon in Russia and would stay in the army until 1816.

He later took part in the 1821 Liberal revolt of Sardinia-Piedmont in Italy. The rebels would be defeated by a joint Sardinian and Austrian force at Novara.

In 1830–31, Ramorino was a general of the Polish insurrectionist army in their November 1830 Uprising, fleeing with his troops to Austria after the decisive Polish defeat at Battle of Warsaw. He would spend some time exiled in France afterwards.

From the mid-1830s, would be named by Giuseppe Mazzini to be commander in chief of an expedition to Savoy. He will forever be known as an incompetent general due to the part he played when asked to arrange for an army to arrive from Paris to aid a rising; it transpired that he had gambled away his money and that no help would be forthcoming. In the revolutions, he took charge of a Piedmontese division.

In 1848 he offered his services to Sardinian king Charles Albert during the First Italian War of Independence, but would only receive command after the Sardinian defeat at the Battle of Custoza, taking control of the fifth Lombard division. He was of accused of disobeying orders before the Battle of Novara, contributing to the defeat. That same year, he was executed. Upon his own request he was allowed to command the shooting squad himself.

== See also ==
- Adam Jerzy Czartoryski
