= Sanniki, Greater Poland Voivodeship =

Sanniki
- Village
- Location within Poland
- Coordinates: 52°25′N 17°19′E
- Country: Poland
- Voivodeship: Greater Poland
- County: Poznań
- Gmina: Kostrzyn
- Population (approx.): 80

Sanniki [sanˈniki] is a village in the administrative district of Gmina Kostrzyn, within Poznań County, Greater Poland Voivodeship, in west-central Poland.

The village has an approximate population of 80.
