= Friedrich Caspar von Geismar =

German-Russian general (1783–1848)

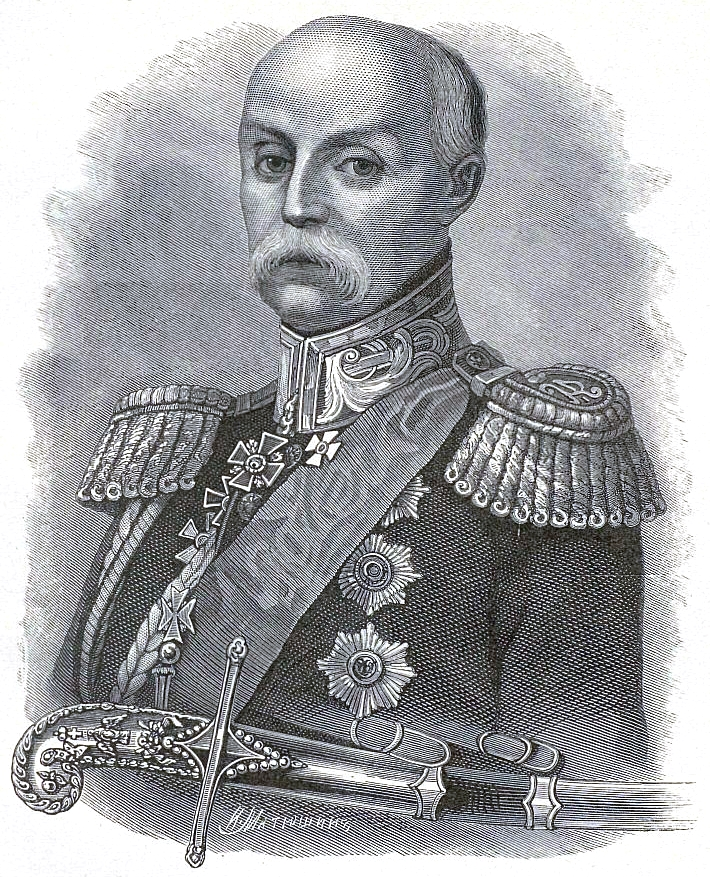
- Geismar on an 1886 engraving
- Native name: Фёдор Клементьевич Гейсмар
- Born: 12 May 1783; Ahlen, Holy Roman Empire
- Died: 1 May 1848 Gródek, Podolia, Russian Empire
- Allegiance: Holy Roman Empire (until c. 1805); (Russia) Russian Empire
- Branch: Imperial Russian Army
- Service years: 1798–1830s
- Rank: Full General
- Commands: Cossack regiment (1813); I Corps, Wilno
- Conflicts: War of the Third Coalition; Battle of Austerlitz; French invasion of Russia; War of the Sixth Coalition; Battle of Leipzig; Russo-Turkish War (1828–1829); Battle near Băilești; November Uprising; Battle of Stoczek; Battle of Iganie; Second Battle of Wawer; Battle of Warsaw (1831); Struggle for Fort 54 (Ordon's Redoubt)
- Awards: Pour le Mérite (military class), Pour le Mérite
- Other work: Industrialist, philanthropist

Baron Friedrich Caspar von Geismar (Russian: Фёдор Клементьевич Гейсмар, romanized: Fyodor Klementyevich Geysmar; 1783–1848) was a German military officer who spent the best part of his career in the service of Imperial Russian Army. He eventually rose to the rank of Full General and became an adjutant to Nicholas I of Russia.

== Biography ==
He was born on 12 May 1783 on the Severinghausen estate near Ahlen into a noble family known since the 13th century. His father was a chamberlain at the court of the king of Prussia. He was an heir to the Dössel line of an old Austrian-German noble family of Geismar zu Riepen from the castle of Warburg. His parents were Baron Clemens August von Geismar, the commander of the Guard Regiment of the Kings of Prussia, and Bernadina de Berswardt.

On 2 August 1798, at the age of 15, he joined the Lower Austrian 4th Infantry Regiment "Hoch- und Deutschmeister". He served as an officer in the 1799 Battle of Novi and the 1800 Battle of Pozzolo and was nominated for membership of the Military Order of Maria Theresa for bravery, but this was rejected because of his age. He served with his unit in the disastrous 1805 battle of Austerlitz, where his unit was destroyed by Napoleon Bonaparte. After the battle, he joined the Russian service and fought in the ranks of Russian Imperial Army during the 1812 French invasion of Russia.

After the 1813 Battle of Leipzig, he was given command of a Cossack cavalry regiment and the task of escorting the ducal family back to Weimar where he defeated a French attack, for which the city of Weimar awarded him honorary citizenship. He joined a local masonic lodge in a ceremony that inspired Goethe to write his poem Creed.

After the war, he put down the Chernigov Regiment revolt of the Decembrists and, in the 1828 Turkish campaign, won a battle near Băilești. In 1830, his native town of Ahlen also awarded him with honorary citizenship.

Later that year, he fought against the November Uprising in Poland. In a series of defeats, he lost most of his soldiers in the battles of Stoczek, Iganie and Wawer, and considered suicide. Eventually he was given command over a new force and took part in the final Battle of Warsaw. During the struggle for Fort 54 (Ordon's Redoubt), he was severely wounded.

After the Polish campaign, he commanded the I Corps stationed in Wilno, but was accused of conniving Konarski's revolutionary activities and forced into retirement. In 1842, he settled at his property in Podolia, the village of Gródek. He built several factories, churches, a school and a hospital for locals.

Geismar had many children from two marriages, first to a Romanian princess from the House of Ghika (whom he had met during the Turkish war and later divorced) and then to Herder's niece named Nathalie.

He died of a stroke in St Petersburg on 10 May 1848.

== Sources ==
- "Гейсмар, Федор Клементьевич" . Brockhaus and Efron Encyclopedic Dictionary (in Russian). 1906.
