= First battle of Wawer =

Coordinates: 52.2139°N 21.1581°E

- Part of Polish–Russian War 1830–1831
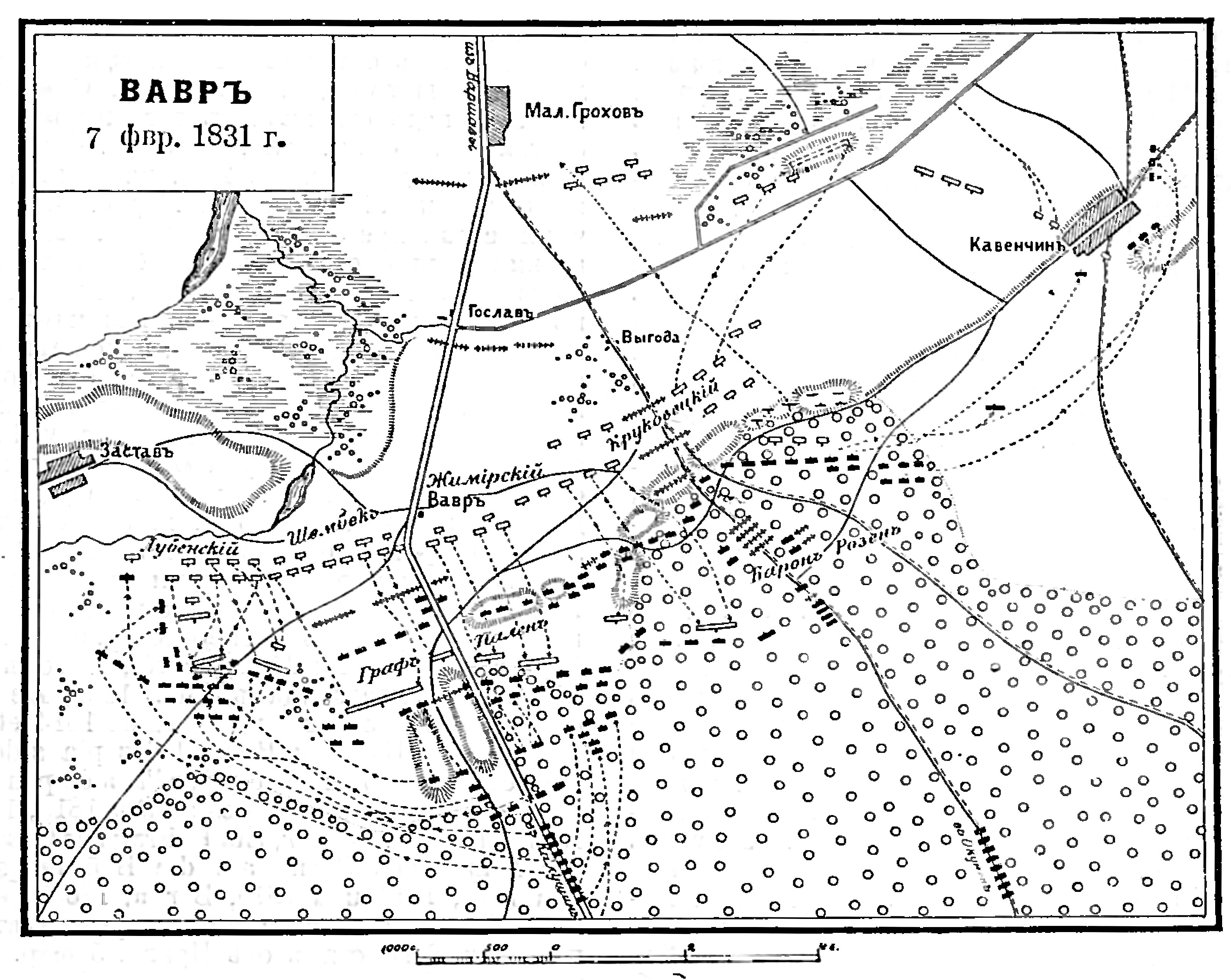
Date	February 19 (7 O.S.), 1831
Location	Wawer near Warsaw, Poland
Result	Russian victory

Belligerents
Kingdom of Poland	Imperial Russia

Commanders and leaders
Michał Radziwiłł	Hans Karl von Diebitsch

Strength
44,000	52,000

Casualties and losses
3,500	3,700–4,000

The first battle of Wawer was fought on 19 February 1831, between Poland and Russia. Polish forces, led by Michał Gedeon Radziwiłł, were defeated by the Russian Pahlen and Rosen corps, commanded by Hans Karl von Diebitsch. In this battle, Polish commanders did not receive any reinforcements, unlike the Russians.

== See also ==
- Second battle of Wawer

== Used materials ==
- Bodart, Gaston (1908). Militär-historisches Kriegs-Lexikon (1618–1905) (in German). Vienna and Leipzig: C. W. Stern.
- Egorshina, O.; Petrova, A. (2023). История русской армии [The history of the Russian Army] (in Russian). Moscow: Edition of the Russian Imperial Library. ISBN 978-5-699-42397-2.
