= November Uprising =

Anti-Russian uprising in the Polish–Lithuanian Commonwealth (1830–31)

- Part of the Revolutions of 1830 and Russo-Polish Wars
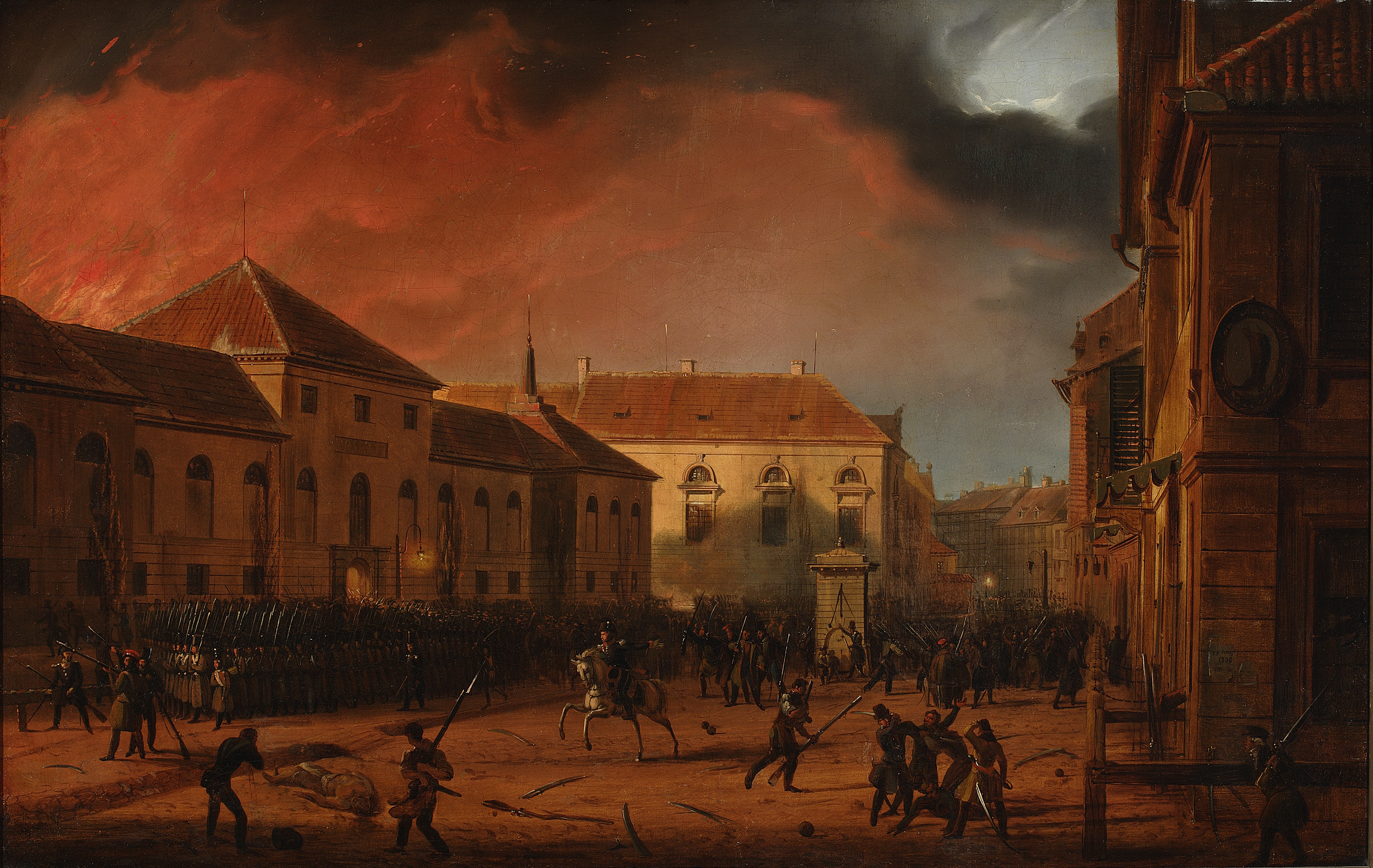
- Taking of the Warsaw Arsenal. Painting by Marcin Zaleski. Map of the uprising
Date	29 November 1830 – 21 October 1831
Location	Russian Empire (Poland, Lithuania, Belarus and right-bank Ukraine)
Result	Russian victory: Polish autonomy decreased

Belligerents
National Government	Russian Empire: Congress Poland; Polish loyalists

Commanders and leaders
Józef Chłopicki; Adam Czartoryski; M.G. Radziwiłł; Jan Skrzynecki; Ignacy Prądzyński; K. Małachowski; Maciej Rybiński; Jan Umiński; Emilia Plater	(Russian Empire) Nicholas I; (Russian Empire) Hans Diebitsch #; (Russian Empire) Ivan Paskevich; (Russian Empire) Friedrich Geismar; (Russian Empire) Georg von Rosen; (Russian Empire) Cyprian Kreutz; (Russian Empire) Karl von Toll; (Russian Empire) Dmitri Sacken; (Russian Empire) Ivan Nabokov; (Russian Empire) Friedrich von Berg; (Russian Empire) Georg von Nostitz; (Russian Empire) Karl Bistram (WIA); (Russian Empire) Pavel Martynov; (Russian Empire) Mikhail Gorchakov; (Russian Empire) Peter von Pahlen

Strength
Army of Poland: 150,000	Russian Imperial Army: 180,000–200,000

Casualties and losses
Polish claim: 40,000 killed or wounded	Polish claim: about 22,000–23,000 killed or wounded

The November Uprising (Polish: powstanie listopadowe), also known as the Polish–Russian War of 1830–31 or the Cadet Revolution, was an armed rebellion in the heartland of partitioned Poland against the Russian Empire. The uprising began on 29 November 1830 in Warsaw when young Polish officers from the military academy of the Army of Congress Poland revolted.

The Kingdom of Poland, established by the Congress of Vienna in 1815, was formally a constitutional monarchy in personal union with the Russian Empire, but over time Russia increasingly violated its constitutional autonomy. Political repression, censorship, and the curtailment of civil liberties, combined with the influence of revolutionary movements in Western Europe, contributed to growing discontent among Polish elites, officers, and students. The uprising began on the night of 29 November 1830 in Warsaw, initiated by a group of young Polish military cadets led by Piotr Wysocki. Their goal was to assassinate or capture the Russian viceroy, Grand Duke Constantine, and spark a national revolt. Although the initial action was poorly coordinated, it quickly escalated as Warsaw’s population and parts of the Polish army joined the rebellion. Within days, Russian authorities were forced to withdraw from the capital, and the provisional Polish National Government was formed.

Large segments of the peoples of what now constitutes Lithuania, Belarus and Right-bank Ukraine soon joined the uprising. The Polish leadership, however, was divided between moderates seeking compromise and radicals advocating full independence, which hindered effective decision-making. Despite several tactical successes—such as the battles of Stoczek and Wawer, the Polish army was outmatched by Russia’s superior numbers and resources under Ivan Paskevich. In February 1831, the Polish Sejm formally deposed Tsar Nicholas I as king of Poland, turning the uprising into a struggle for complete sovereignty. The decisive defeat came after a prolonged campaign culminating in the siege and storming of Warsaw in September 1831. After the capital fell, resistance continued briefly in fortresses such as Modlin and Zamość, but organized resistance collapsed by October.

In retaliation, Tsar Nicholas issued the Organic Statute in 1832, according to which, henceforth Russian-occupied Poland would lose its autonomy and become an integral part of the Russian Empire. Warsaw became little more than a military garrison, and its university closed. Thousands of insurgents were executed, imprisoned, or forced into exile in what became known as the Great Emigration, which included many prominent intellectuals and artists. The response to the November Uprising in Western Europe revealed a sharp divide between popular sentiment and state policy. While the Polish cause inspired admiration and moral support, geopolitical caution and commitment to the Vienna System ensured that Poland remained diplomatically isolated.

== Background ==
After the Partitions of Poland by Austria, Prussia, and Russia, Poland ceased to exist as an independent political entity at the end of 1795. However, the Napoleonic Wars and Polish participation in the wars against Russia and Austria resulted in the creation of the Duchy of Warsaw in 1807. The Congress of Vienna brought that state's existence to an end in 1815, and essentially solidified the long-term division of Poland between Russia, Prussia and Austria. The Austrian Empire annexed territories in the south, Prussia took control over the semi-autonomous Grand Duchy of Poznań in the west and Russia assumed hegemony over the semi-autonomous so-called Congress Kingdom.

Initially, the Russian-formed Congress Kingdom enjoyed a relatively large amount of internal autonomy and was only indirectly subject to imperial control. It had its own constitution. The province, united with Russia through a personal union with the Tsar as King of Poland, could elect its own parliament (the Sejm) and government. The kingdom had its own courts, army and treasury. Over time, the freedoms granted to the Kingdom were gradually taken back, and the constitution was progressively ignored by the Russian authorities. Alexander I of Russia never formally crowned himself as King of Poland. Instead, in 1815, he appointed his brother, Grand Duke Constantine Pavlovich as de facto viceroy and disregarded the constitution.

Soon after the Congress of Vienna resolutions had been signed, Russia ceased to respect them. In 1819, Alexander I abandoned liberty of the press in the Congress Kingdom and introduced censorship. The Russian secret police, commanded by Nikolay Nikolayevich Novosiltsev, started to infiltrate and persecute Polish clandestine organizations, and in 1821, the Tsar ordered the abolition of Freemasonry. As a result, after 1825, sessions of the Polish Sejm were conducted in secret. Nicholas I of Russia formally crowned himself as King of Poland on 24 May 1829 in Warsaw.

Despite numerous protests by various Polish politicians who actively supported the "personal union", Grand Duke Constantine had no intention of respecting the Polish constitution, one of the most progressive in Europe at that time. He abolished Polish social and patriotic organizations and the liberal opposition of the Kaliszanie faction, and replaced Poles with Russians in important administrative positions. Although married to a Pole (Joanna Grudzińska), he was commonly considered an enemy of the Polish nation. Also, his command over the Polish Army led to serious conflicts within the officer corps. The frictions led to various conspiracies throughout the country, most notably within the army.

== Outbreak ==
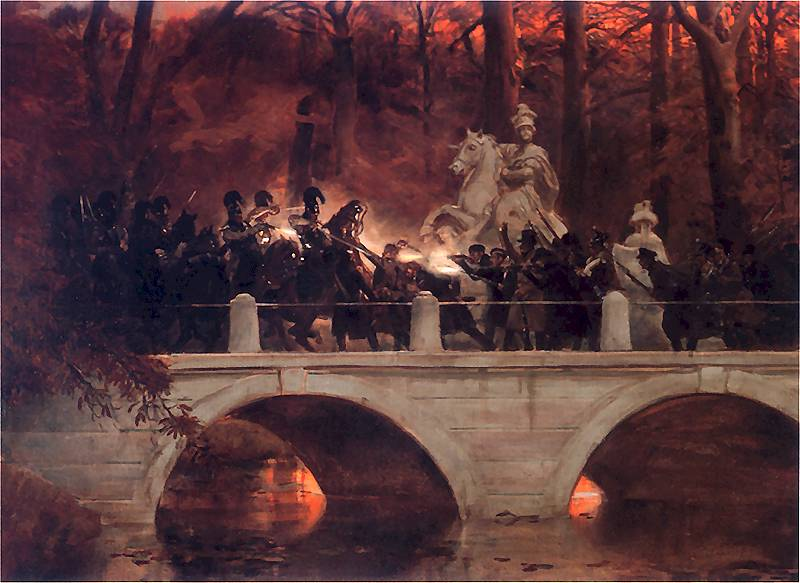
Fighting between Polish insurgents and the Russian cuirassiers on a bridge in Warsaw's Łazienki Park. In the background, an equestrian statue of King John III Sobieski. Painting by Wojciech Kossak, 1898.

The armed struggle began when a group of conspirators led by a young cadet from the Warsaw officers' school, Piotr Wysocki, took arms from their garrison on 29 November 1830 and attacked the Belweder Palace, the main seat of the Grand Duke. The final spark that ignited Warsaw was a Russian plan to use the Polish Army to suppress France's July Revolution and the Belgian Revolution, in clear violation of the Polish constitution.

The rebels managed to enter the Belweder, but Grand Duke Constantine had escaped in women's clothing. The rebels then turned to the main city arsenal and captured it after a brief struggle. The following day, armed Polish civilians forced the Russian troops to withdraw north of Warsaw. That incident is sometimes called the Warsaw Uprising or the November Night. (Polish: Noc listopadowa).

The coat-of-arms of the November Uprising

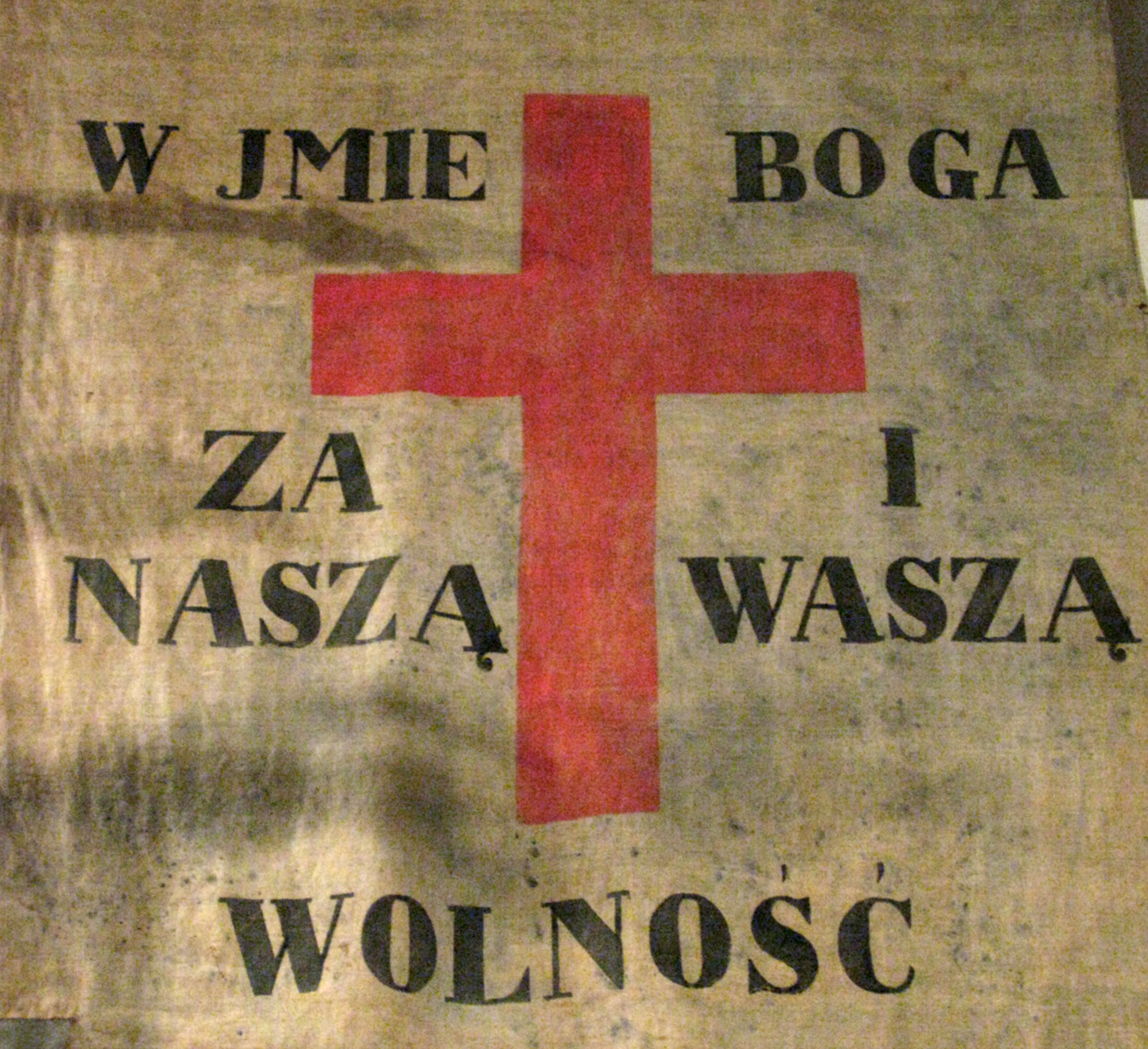
Flag of the November Uprising that carried the motto "For our freedom and yours"

On 7 February 1831, the uprising adopted white and red, the tinctures (colours) of the Polish and Lithuanian coats of arms, as the national cockade of Poland

== Uprising ==
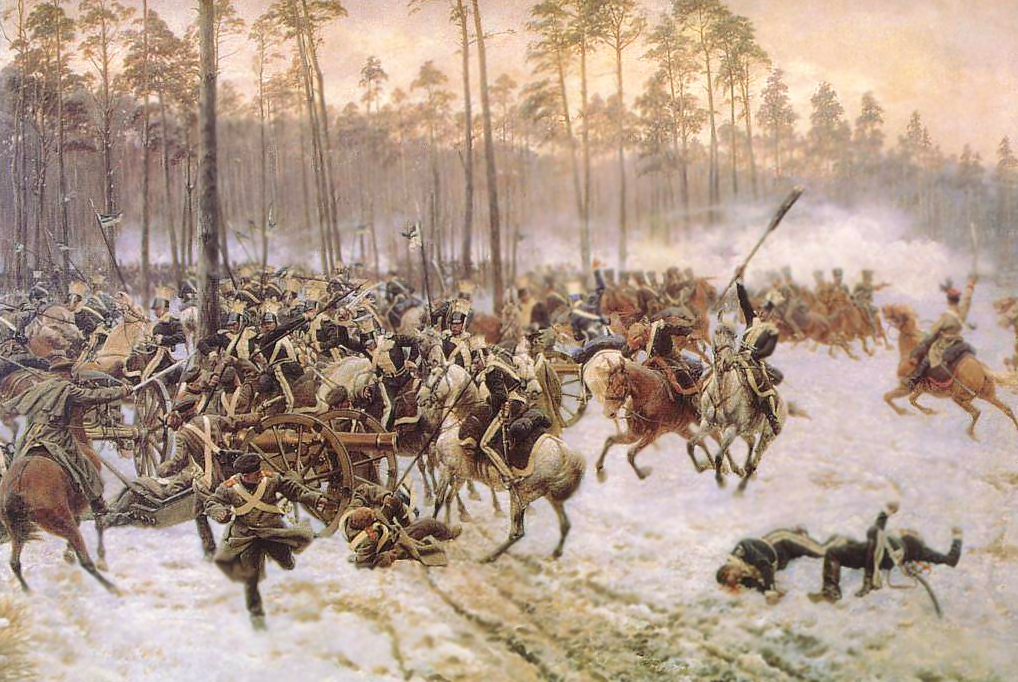
The Battle of Stoczek by Jan Rosen

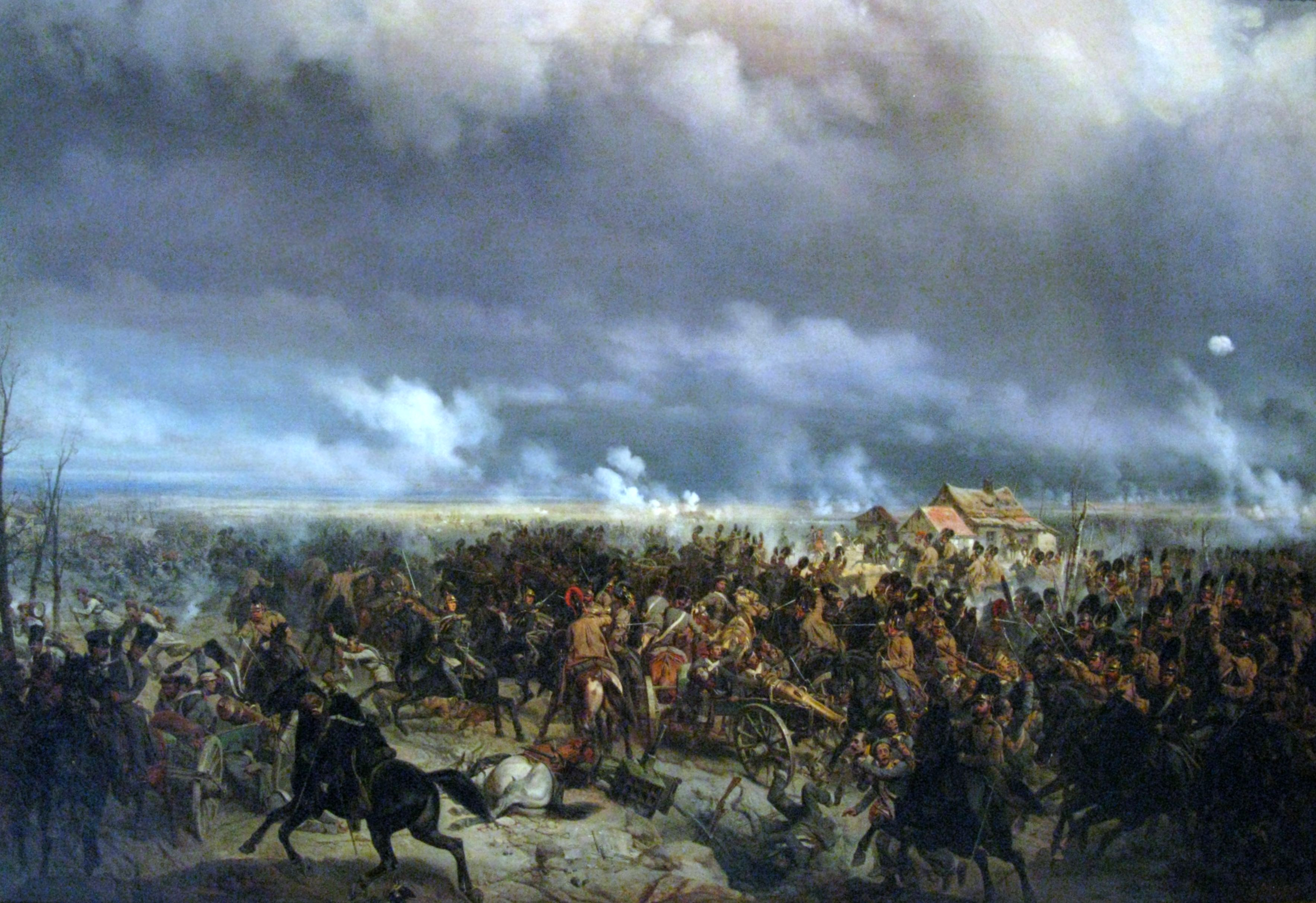
The Battle of Olszynka Grochowska

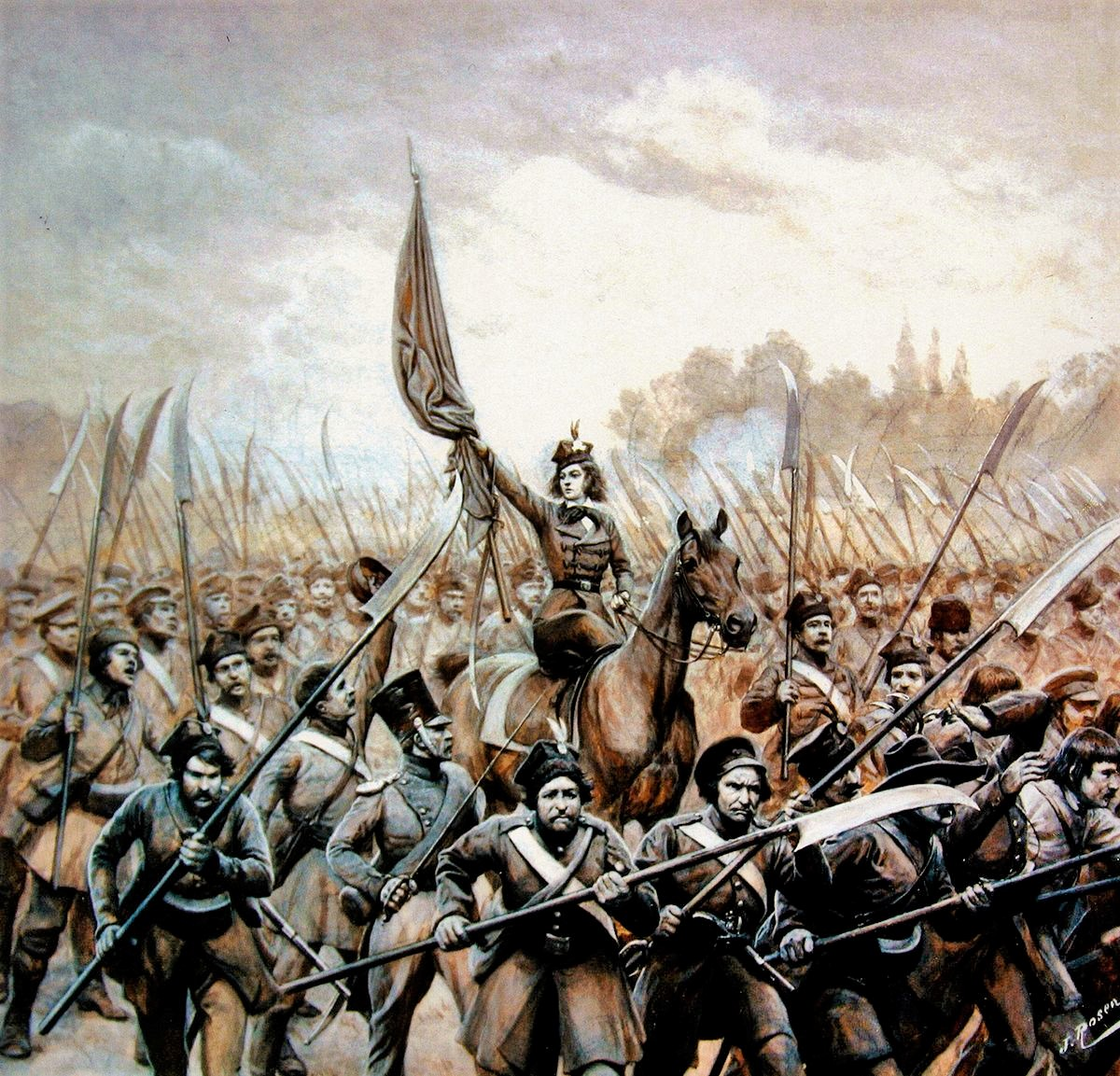
Emilia Plater leading scythemen 1831

Taken by surprise with the rapidly unfolding of events during the night of 29 November 1830, the local Polish government (administrative council) assembled immediately to take control and to decide on a course of action. Unpopular ministers were removed and men like Prince Adam Jerzy Czartoryski, the historian Julian Ursyn Niemcewicz and General Józef Chłopicki took their places. Loyalists led by Prince Czartoryski initially tried to negotiate with Grand Duke Constantine and to settle matters peacefully. However, when Czartoryski told the council that Constantine was ready to forgive the offenders and that the matter would be amicably settled, Maurycy Mochnacki and other radicals angrily objected and demanded a national uprising. Fearing an immediate break with Russia, the government agreed to let Constantine depart with his troops.

Mochnacki did not trust the newly constituted ministry and set out to replace it with the Patriotic Club, organized by him. At a large public demonstration on 3 December in Warsaw, he denounced the negotiations between the government and Grand Duke Constantine, who was encamped outside the city. Mochnacki advocated a military campaign in Lithuania to spare the country from the devastation of war and to preserve the local food supply. The meeting adopted a number of demands to be communicated to the administrative council, including the establishment of a revolutionary government and an immediate attack upon the forces of Constantine. The Polish army, with all but two of its generals, Wincenty Krasiński and Zygmunt Kurnatowski, now joined the uprising.

The remaining four ministers of the pre-revolutionary cabinet left the administrative council, and their places were taken by Mochnacki and three of his associates from the Patriotic Club, including Joachim Lelewel. The new body was known as the "provisional government". To legalize its actions the provisional government ordered the convocation of the Sejm and on 5 December 1830 proclaimed General Chłopicki as "dictator of the uprising".

Chłopicki considered the uprising an act of madness but bowed to pressure and consented to take command temporarily in the hope that it would be unnecessary to take the field. An able and highly decorated soldier, he had retired from the army because of the chicanery of Constantine. He overestimated the power of Russia and underestimated the strength and the fervor of the Polish revolutionary movement. By temperament and conviction, he was opposed to a war with Russia and did not believe in a successful outcome. He accepted the dictatorship essentially to maintain internal peace and to save the constitution.

Believing that Tsar Nicholas was unaware of his brother's actions and that the uprising could be ended if the Russian authorities accepted the constitution, Chłopicki's first move was to send Prince Franciszek Ksawery Drucki-Lubecki to Saint Petersburg to negotiate. Chłopicki refrained from strengthening the Polish army and refused to initiate armed hostilities by expelling Russian forces from Lithuania. However, the radicals in Warsaw pressed for war and the complete liberation of Poland. On 13 December, the Sejm pronounced the National Uprising against Russia, and on 7 January 1831, Prince Drucki-Lubecki returned from Russia with no concessions. The Tsar demanded the complete and unconditional surrender of Poland and announced that the "Poles should surrender to the grace of their Emperor". His plans foiled, Chłopicki resigned the following day.

Power in Poland was now in the hands of the radicals united in the Towarzystwo Patriotyczne ('Patriotic Society'), directed by Joachim Lelewel. On 25 January 1831, the Sejm passed the Act of Dethronization of Nicholas I, which ended the Polish-Russian personal union and was equivalent to a declaration of war on Russia. The proclamation declared that "the Polish nation is an independent people and has a right to offer the Polish crown to him whom it may consider worthy, from whom it might with certainty expect faith to his oath and wholehearted respect to the sworn guarantees of civic freedom."

On 29 January, the national government of Adam Jerzy Czartoryski was established, and Michał Gedeon Radziwiłł was chosen as successor to Chłopicki, who was persuaded to accept active command of the army.

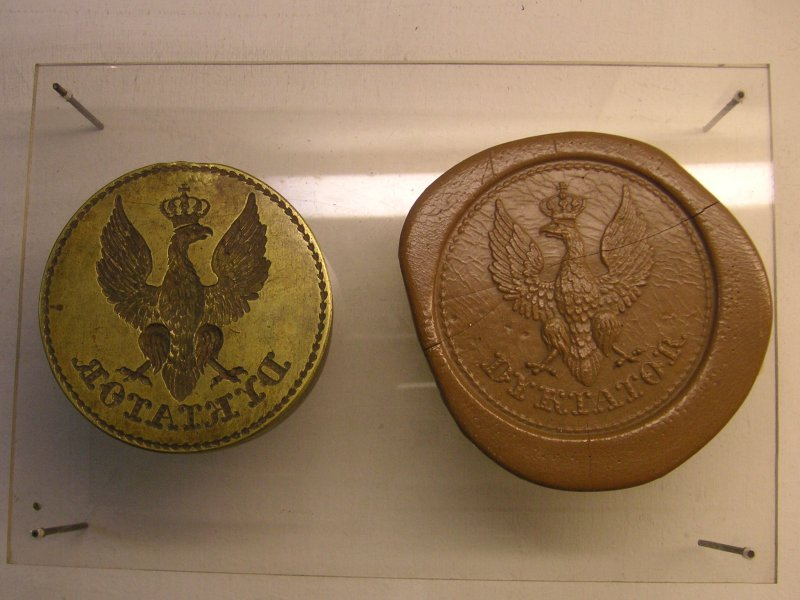
Seal of the "dictator" of the uprising

== Russo-Polish War ==
It was too late to move the theatre of hostilities to Lithuania. On 4 February 1831, a 115,000-strong Russian army under Field Marshal Hans Karl von Diebitsch crossed the Polish borders. The force included the Finnish Guards' Rifle Battalion. The first major battle took place on 14 February 1831, close to the village of Stoczek near Łuków. In the Battle of Stoczek, Polish cavalry under Brigadier Józef Dwernicki defeated the Russian division of Teodor Geismar. However, the victory had mostly psychological value and could not stop the Russian advance towards Warsaw. The subsequent Battles of Dobre, Wawer and Białołęka were inconclusive.

The Polish forces then assembled on the right bank of the Vistula to defend the capital. On 25 February, a Polish contingent of approximately 40,000 met a Russian force of 60,000 east of Warsaw at the Battle of Olszynka Grochowska. Both armies withdrew after almost two days of heavy fighting and with considerable losses on both sides. Over 7,000 Poles fell on that field, and the number of killed in the Russian army was slightly larger. Diebitsch was forced to retreat to Siedlce and Warsaw was saved.

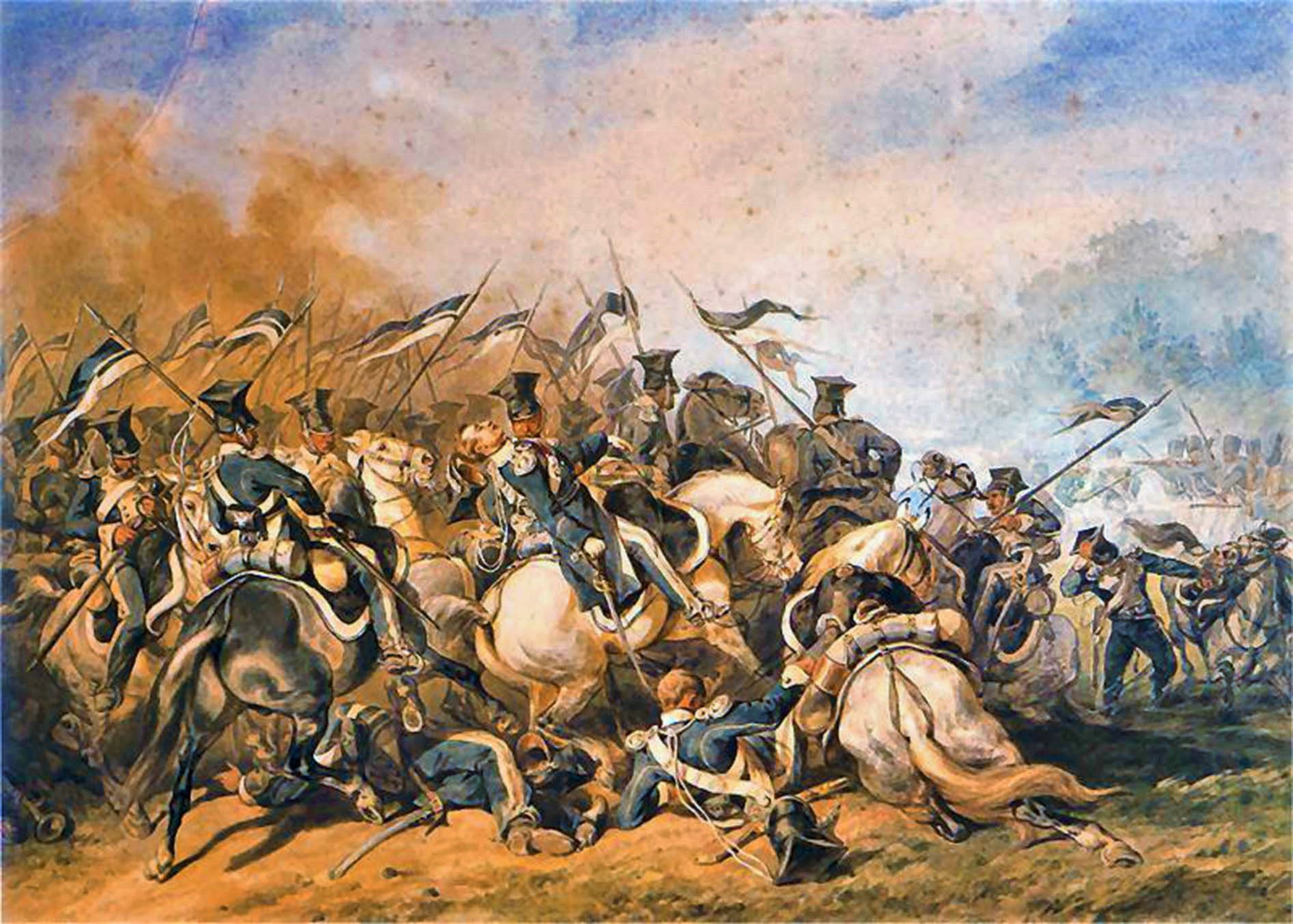
The Battle of Ostrołęka, painting by Juliusz Kossak

Chłopicki, whose soldierly qualities reasserted themselves by military activity, was wounded in action and his place taken by General Jan Skrzynecki, who, like his predecessor, had won distinction under Napoleon for personal courage. Disliked by Grand Duke Constantine, he had retired from service. He shared with Chłopicki the conviction that war with Russia was futile but with the opening of hostilities took command of a corps and fought creditably at Grochov. When the weak and indecisive Michał Radziwiłł surrendered the dictatorship, Skrzynecki was chosen to succeed him. He endeavored to end the war by negotiations with the Russian field commanders and hoped for benign foreign intervention.

Sympathetic echoes of the Polish aspirations reverberated throughout Europe. Enthusiastic meetings had been held in Paris under Lafayette's chairmanship, and money for the Polish cause was collected in the United States. The governments of France and Britain, however, did not share the feelings of some of their people. King Louis-Philippe of France thought mainly of securing for himself recognition on the part of all European governments, and Lord Palmerston was intent on maintaining friendly relations with Russia.

Britain regarded with alarm the reawakening of the French national spirit and did not wish to weaken Russia, "as Europe might soon again require her services in the cause of order, and to prevent Poland, whom it regarded as a national ally of France, from becoming a French province of the Vistula". Austria and Prussia adopted a position of benevolent neutrality towards Russia. They closed the Polish frontiers and prevented the transportation of munitions of war or supplies of any kind.

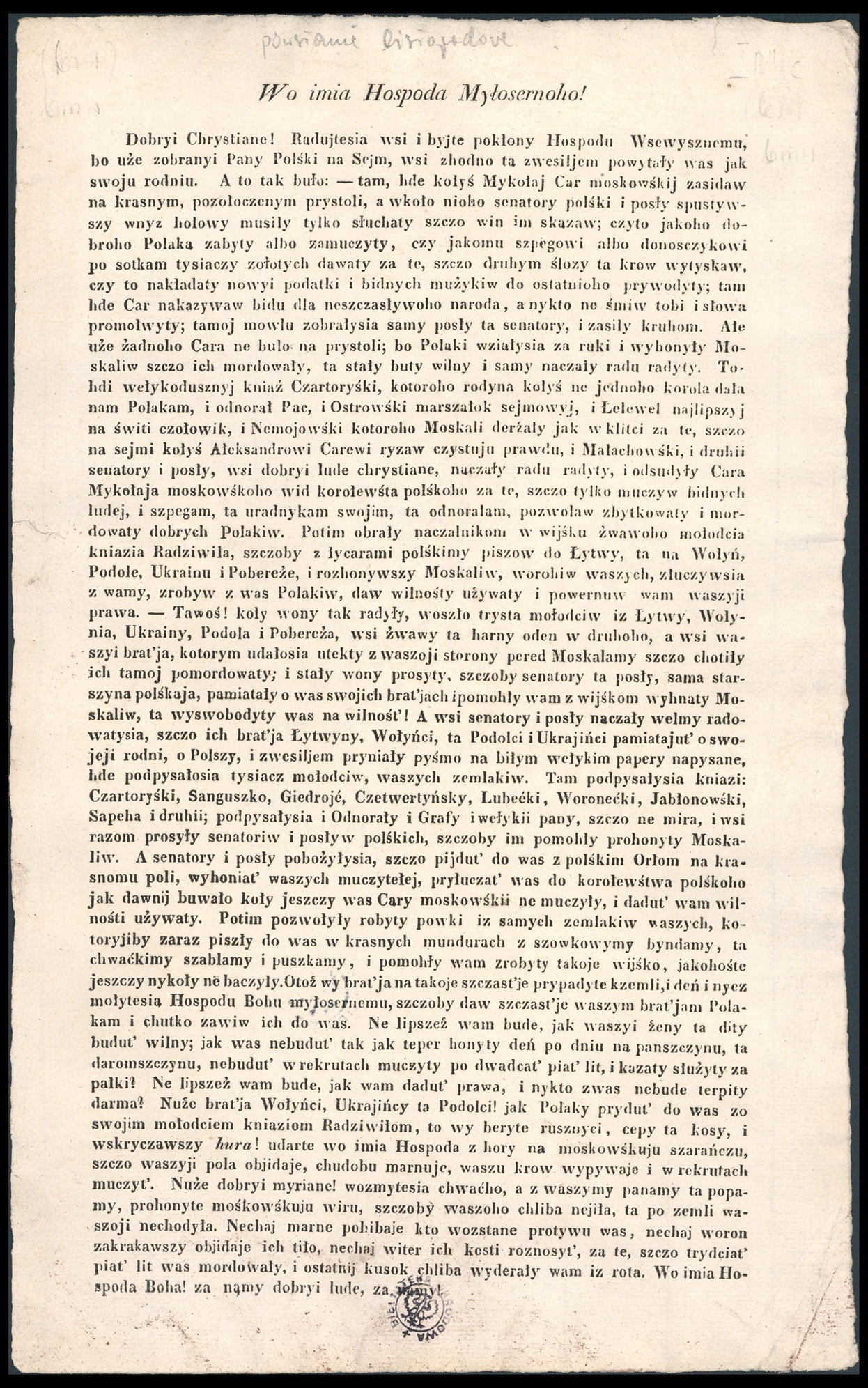
Appeal to Volhynians, Ukrainians and Podolians to fight against Muscovites

Under those circumstances, the war with Russia began to take on a somber and disquieting aspect. The Poles fought desperately and attempts were made to rouse Volhynia, Podolia, Samogitia and Lithuania. With the exception of the Lithuanian uprising in which the youthful Countess Emilia Plater and several other women distinguished themselves, the guerilla warfare carried on in the frontier provinces was of minor importance and served only to give Russia an opportunity to crush local risings. Notorious was the slaughter of the inhabitants of the small town of Ashmiany in Belarus. Meanwhile, new Russian forces under Grand Duke Michael Pavlovich of Russia arrived in Poland but met with many defeats. Constant warfare, however, and bloody battles such as that at Ostroleka in which 8,000 Poles died, considerably depleted the Polish forces. Mistakes on the part of the commanders, constant changes and numerous resignations, and the inactivity of the commanders, who continued to hope for foreign intervention, added to the feeling of despair.

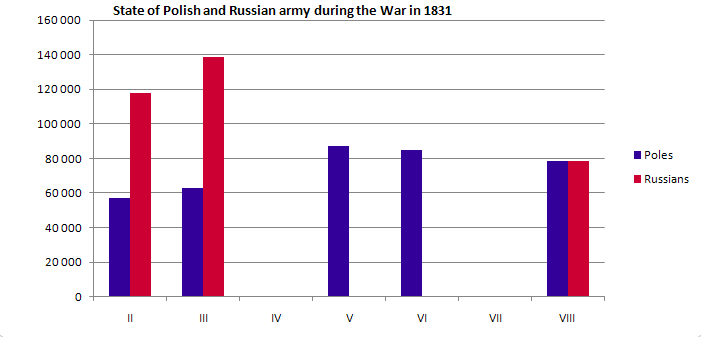
A comparison of the number of soldiers on both sides during Polish-Russian War, 1831

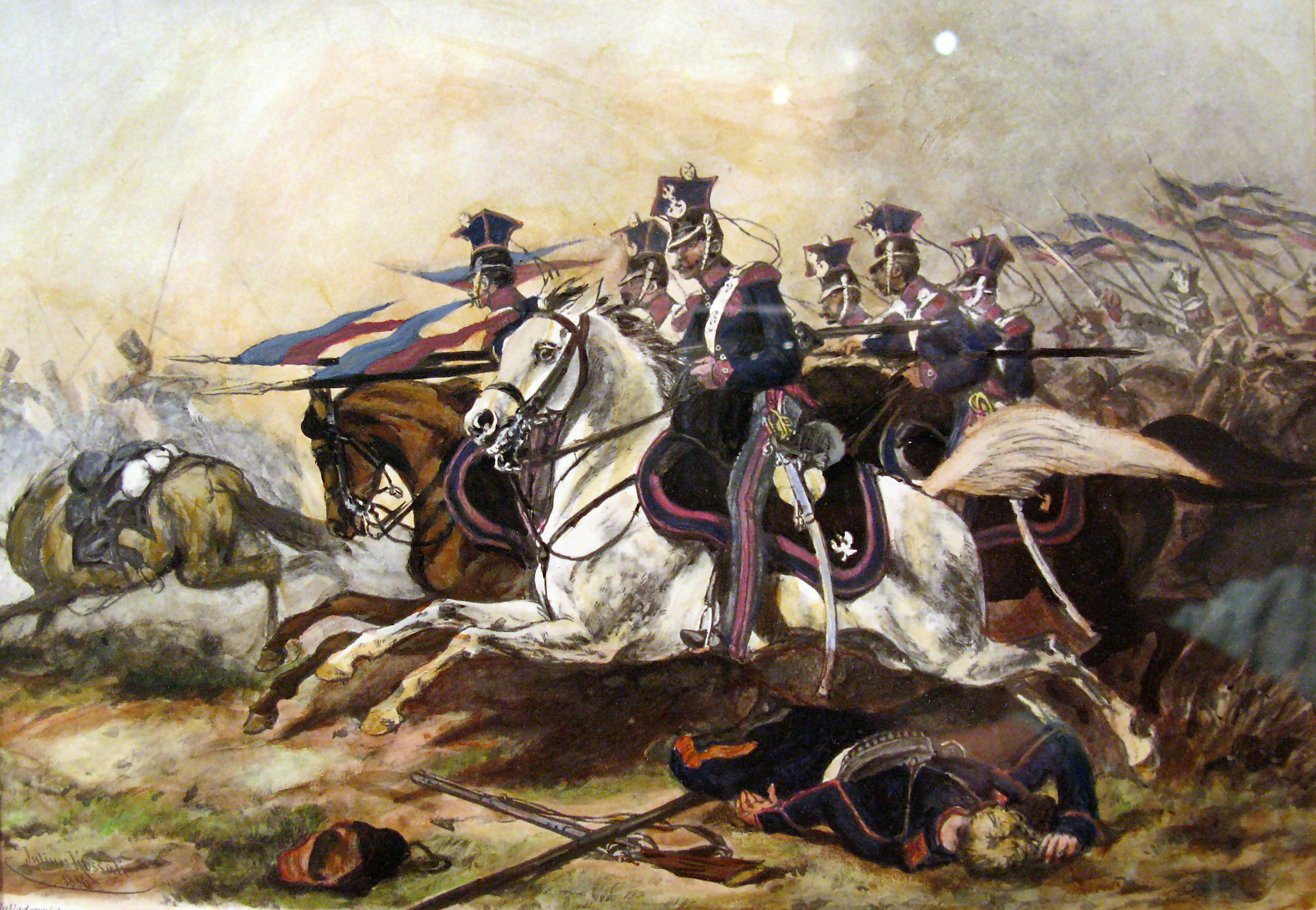
A charge of Polish uhlans in the city of Poznań during the November Uprising

The more radical elements severely criticized the government not only for its inactivity but also for its lack of land reform and its failure to recognize the peasants' rights to the soil they tilled, but the Sejm, fearing that the governments of Europe might regard the war with Russia as social revolution, procrastinated and haggled over concessions. The initial enthusiasm of the peasantry waned, and the ineptitude of the government became more apparent.

In the meantime, the Russian forces, commanded after the death of Diebitsch by General Paskevich, were moving to encircle Warsaw. Skrzynecki failed to prevent the Russian forces from joining, and the Sejm responded to popular clamor for his deposition by appointing General Dembinski to temporary command. The atmosphere was highly charged. Severe rioting took place and the government became completely disorganized. Count Jan Krukowiecki was made President of the Ruling Council. He had little faith in the success of the military campaign but believed that when passions had subsided he could end the war on what seemed to him advantageous terms.

Despite a desperate defence by General Józef Sowiński, Warsaw's suburb of Wola fell to Paskevich's forces on 6 September. The next day saw the second line of the capital's defensive works attacked by the Russians. During the night of 7 September Krukowiecki capitulated, although the city still held out. He was immediately deposed by the Polish government and replaced by Bonawentura Niemojowski. The army and the government withdrew to the Modlin fortress, on the Vistula, subsequently renamed Novo-Georgievsk by the Russians, and then to Płock. New plans had been adopted when the news arrived that the Polish crack corps under Ramorino, unable to join the main army, had laid down its arms after crossing the Austrian frontier into Galicia. It became evident that the war could be carried on no longer.

On 5 October 1831, the remainder of the Polish army of over 20,000 men crossed the Prussian frontier and laid down their arms at Brodnica in preference to submission to Russia. Only one man, a colonel by the name of Stryjenski, gained the peculiar distinction of giving himself up to Russia.

Following the example of Dąbrowski a generation before, General Bem endeavored to reorganize the Polish soldiers in Prussia and Galicia into Legions and lead them to France, but the Prussian government frustrated his plans. The immigrants left Prussia in bands of between fifty and a hundred, and their journey through the various German principalities was greeted with enthusiasm by the local populations. Even German sovereigns such as the King of Saxony, the Princess of Weimar and the Duke of Gotha shared in the general demonstration of sympathy. It was only upon the very insistent demands of Russia that the Polish committees all over Germany were closed.

== Aftermath ==
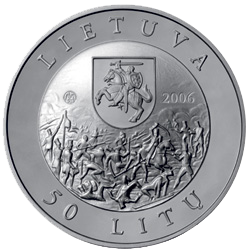
Lithuanian Litas commemorative coin dedicated to the uprising

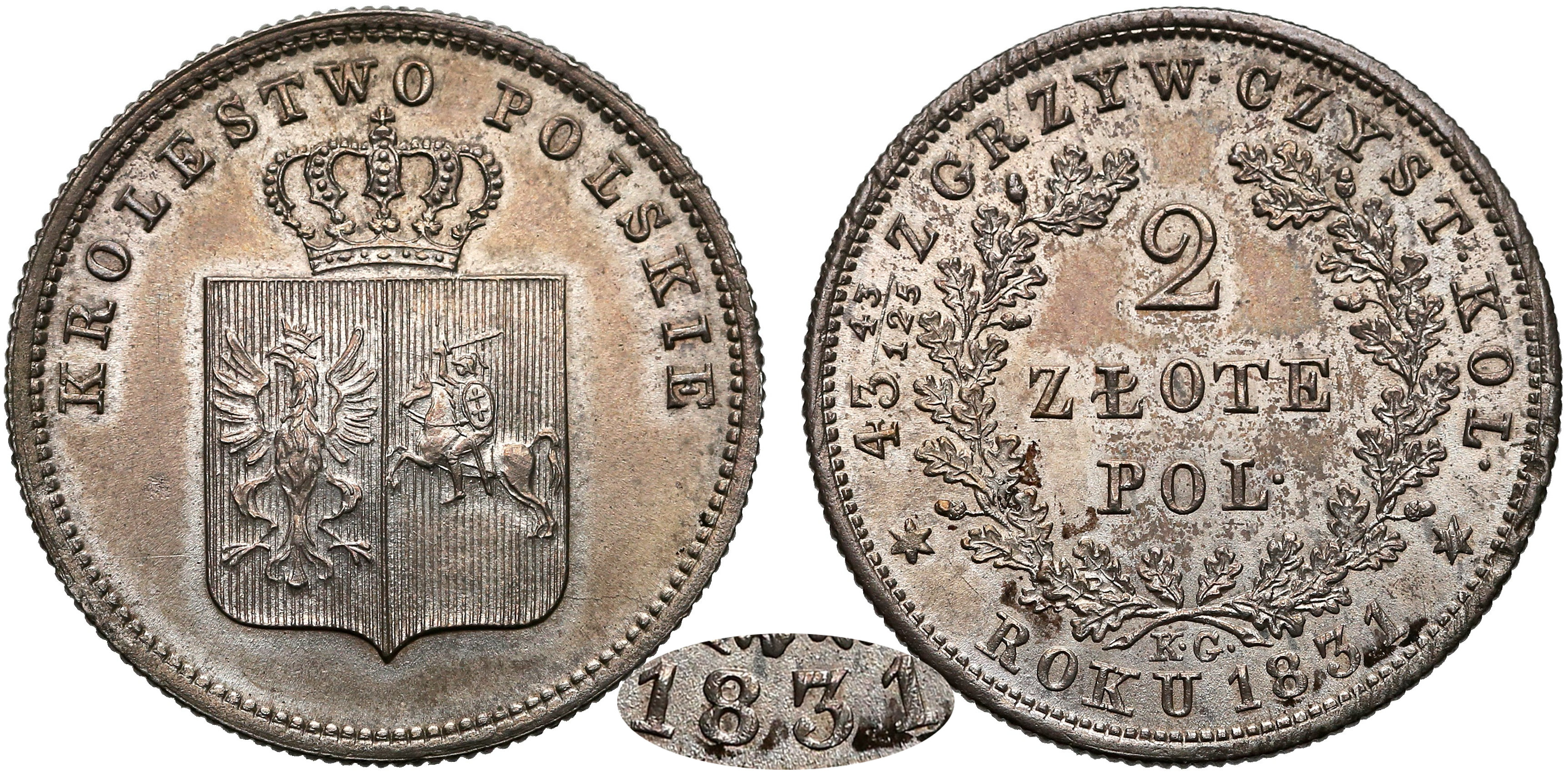
A Polish 2 zloty coin from the Uprising

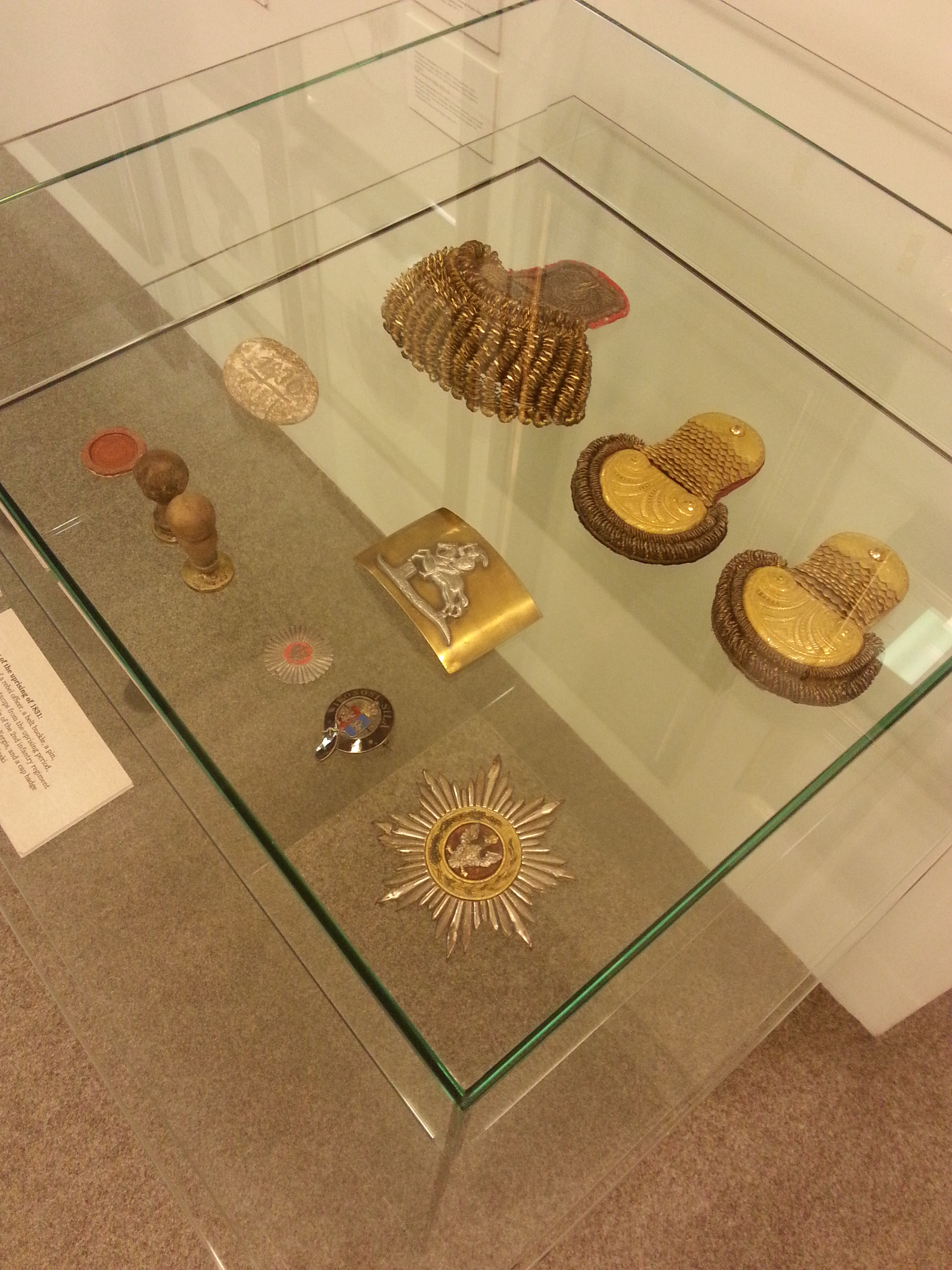
Relics of the uprising of 1831, exhibited in the National Museum of Lithuania in Vilnius.

Adam Czartoryski remarked that the war with Russia, precipitated by the rising of young patriots in November 1830, came either too early or too late. Puzyrewski argued that the rising should have been initiated in 1828, when Russia was experiencing reversals in Turkey and was least able to spare substantial forces for war with Poland (Lewinski-Corwin, 1917). Military critics, such as the Russian pundit General Puzyrevsky, maintained that in spite of the inequality of resources of the two countries, Poland had had every chance of holding her own against Russia if the campaign had been managed skillfully.

Russia sent over 180,000 well-trained men against Poland's 70,000, 30% of whom were fresh recruits entering the service at the opening of hostilities.

"In view of this, one would think that not only was the result of the struggle undoubted, but its course should have been a triumphant march for the infinitely stronger party. Instead, the war lasted eight months, with often doubtful success. At times the balance seemed to tip decidedly to the side of the weaker adversary who dealt not only blows but even ventured daring offensives."

It had long been argued, as by Edward Lewinski-Corwin in 1917, that "anarchy and a lack of concord" among people were the causes of Poland's national downfall. Thus, when the rising finally began, the insurgents demanded absolute power for their leaders and tolerated no criticism for fear that discord would again prove ruinous for all. However, the men chosen to lead, because of their past achievements, proved unable to perform the great task expected of them. Moreover, many apparently had little faith that their joint effort could succeed.

Militarily, Poland might have succeeded if the line of battle had been established in Lithuania, wrote Lewinski-Corwin, and if the Russian forces, arriving in Poland progressively, had been dealt with separately and decisively, one unit after another.

After the end of the November Uprising, Polish women wore black ribands and jewellery as a symbol of mourning for their lost homeland. Such images can be seen in the first scenes of the movie Pan Tadeusz, filmed by Andrzej Wajda in 1999, based on the Polish national epic. A 1937 German film, Ride to Freedom was partly shot on location in Poland.

The Scottish poet Thomas Campbell, who had championed the cause of the Poles in The Pleasures of Hope, was affected by the news of the capture of Warsaw by the Russians in 1831 as if it had been the deepest of personal calamities. "Poland preys on my heart night and day", he wrote in one of his letters, and his sympathy found a practical expression in the foundation in London of the Association of the Friends of Poland. The November Uprising was also supported in the United States. Edgar Allan Poe was sympathetic to the Polish cause and volunteered to fight the Russians during the November Uprising (Bobr-Tylingo 1982, 145).

Despite Poland's deep connection to Catholicism and the fact that many participants in the rebellion were Catholic, the rebellion was condemned by the Church. Pope Gregory XVI issued an encyclical letter in the following year on the subject of civil disobedience. Cum Primum stated:

When the first report of the calamities, which so seriously devastated your flourishing kingdom reached our ears, We learned simultaneously that they had been caused by some fabricators of deceit and lies. Under the pretext of religion, and revolting against the legitimate authority of the princes, they filled their fatherland, which they loosed from due obedience to authority, with mourning. We shed abundant tears at the feet of God, grieving over the harsh evil with which some of our flock was afflicted. Afterward We humbly prayed that God would enable your provinces, agitated by so many and so serious dissensions, to be restored to peace and to the rule of legitimate authority.

== In popular culture ==
Frédéric Chopin's Étude Op. 10, No. 12 was written in c. 1831, Scherzo No. 1 was completed around 1833 under influence of the November Uprising. And his "Fantasy in F minor Op. 49" was completed and published in 1841, and many performers regard this work as an “Ode to the Fallen,” in which Chopin is reminiscing about family and friends killed or missing as a result of the 1831 rebellion.

Aleksander Chodźko composed the song "Herby" about this uprising. The remix created by Dawid Hallmann gained popularity.

== See also ==
- Great Emigration
- Warszawianka 1831 roku
- Revolutionary etude
- Hôtel Lambert
- Polish National Government (November Uprising)
- Sources in Polish
- Stanislas Hernisz

General:

- List of wars involving Poland
