= Löwen =

Löwen, literally meaning "lions", may refer to:

== Music ==
- Lowen (band), an English heavy metal band from London

== Places ==
- Leuven or Löwen, the capital and largest city of the province of Flemish Brabant in the Flemish Region of Belgium
- Lewin Brzeski or Löwen, a town in Brzeg County, Opole Voivodeship, Poland

== Sports ==
- Frankfurter Löwen, a defunct American football club from Frankfurt, Germany
- Rhein-Neckar Löwen, a European handball club from Mannheim, Germany
- Basketball Löwen Braunschweig, a basketball club from Braunschweig, Germany

== People with the surname ==
- Albert von Löwen (1166-1192), saint
- Eduard Löwen (born 1997), German footballer
- Eva Helena Löwen (1743-1813), Swedish noble socialite
- Fredrique Löwen (1760–1813), Swedish actress
- Gerhard Löwen (1868–1938), Swedish diplomat

== See also ==
- Loewen, a surname
- Löwenbräu
- Löwenwolde (disambiguation)
