= Battle of Adrianople (1829) =

- Part of the Russo-Turkish Wars
Date	8 August 1829
Location	Edirne (Adrianople), Turkey 41.6771°N 26.55544°E
Result	Russian victory
Territorial changes	Treaty of Adrianople

Belligerents
Russian Empire	Ottoman Empire

Commanders and leaders
(Russian Empire) Hans Karl von Diebitsch	(Ottoman Empire) Reşid Mehmed Pasha

The Battle of Adrianople was one of the final battles of the Russo-Turkish War of 1828-1829 and resulted in the Treaty of Adrianople (1829), which ended that conflict.

== Background ==
Russian interest with regard to the Ottoman Empire centered on the Balkan Peninsula region and the Dardanelles in particular. Ottoman control of this strait left the potential, despite past treaties, to cut off a significant portion of Russian trade and access to the Mediterranean Sea. A weakened Ottoman military in the wake of Sultan Mahmud II's reformation of the armed forces and the recent destruction of their navy during the Greek War of Independence gave the Russian military the opportunity to seize control of the strait, as well as some additional territory. There is also reason to believe that Tsar Nicholas I desired to further reduce the resurgent Ottoman army.

The Balkans were the main focus of Russian attention at this time, but there was a significant interest in the Caucasus as well. Russian aspirations there centered on the creation of a better or more defensible military border with the Ottoman Empire. Though this was not the main objective of this war, the opportunity provided by a weakened Ottoman position in Europe allowed Russian forces the chance to make these goals a reality.

== Prelude ==
The Russian invasion of Ottoman territory in the Balkans was stalled at the end of 1828 by the fortress of Shumla in modern Bulgaria and other similar garrisons. Some of these forces, however, had been pulled up from the Balkan mountains, leaving the path south open to further Russian incursion. Diebitsch decided to bypass the forts after leaving small forces behind to contain the garrisons. This allowed him to approach Adrianople uncontested, but the journey through the mountains was hard on his army, and they were not in the condition to besiege the city. Rather than show weakness to the enemy, Diebitsch pushed his soldiers onward, hoping to bluff the defenders into believing a fresh Russian army had appeared on their doorstep.

== Battle ==
In this case, the label "battle" is misleading as no actual combat took place. The Turkish defenders, surprised and frightened by the appearance of the Russian army at their gates, surrendered without a fight. The Russian bluff paid off and resulted in their occupation of the European capital of the Ottoman Empire.

It is possible that there was a reason beyond fear that prompted the bloodless surrender of one of the Ottoman's most important European cities. Many members of the Adrianople garrison were former Janissaries who deserted almost immediately after the Russian forces' appearance. A number of these men were later arrested and killed for planning to instigate an uprising in Constantinople against the Sultan.

== Aftermath ==
Though the Sultan desired to continue the war, his advisors convinced him to opt for peace following the loss of Adrianople. Turkish envoys arrived in the city on August 17 to begin working on the peace treaty, which was finalized and signed on September 2.

The treaty affected Russian and Ottoman territorial holdings in both Europe and the Caucasus. Though there were no large border shifts, the implications for a number of the affected areas were substantial. In the Caucasus, Russia gained a handful of strong points and a small port. All other territory gained there was returned to the Ottomans. The more significant changes took place in the Balkans region with far-reaching implications for some provinces, especially Moldavia and Wallachia, though most of the land conquered by the Russian army, including Adrianople itself, was returned to Ottoman sovereignty. These two regions had previously been governed by the Ottomans with very little in the way of autonomy. After the Treaty of Adrianople, they had some ability to govern themselves and were even considered Russian protectorates despite being nominally labeled Ottoman territory. Serbia was likewise granted more autonomy and more or less freed of Ottoman governance. Additionally, the Balkan forts that had once acted as a first line of defense for the Ottomans along the Danube River were razed, further liberating these areas of Ottoman influence.

Russian access to the Dardanelles was also changed significantly. Their commercial ships were now to be granted unlimited access, as would the ships from any other nation trading with Russia. This gave Russia much more of an assurance that their commercial access to the Mediterranean would continue and effectively opened them to trade with all other nations.

As a result of the Battle of Adrianople the Ottoman Empire lost control of large portions of its European holdings in all but name, gave up territory in the Caucasus, and lost ability to use the Dardanelles as a bargaining chip. Russia gained influence in the Balkans and assured their ships' access to trade.

=== Post-treaty fighting ===
Some Caucasus commanders were not informed of the treaty until several days later due to slow communications, which led to several small skirmishes in the region after the official end of hostilities.
