= Battle of Kulevicha =

1829 battle of the Russo-Turkish War (1828–1829)

- Part of the Russo-Turkish War
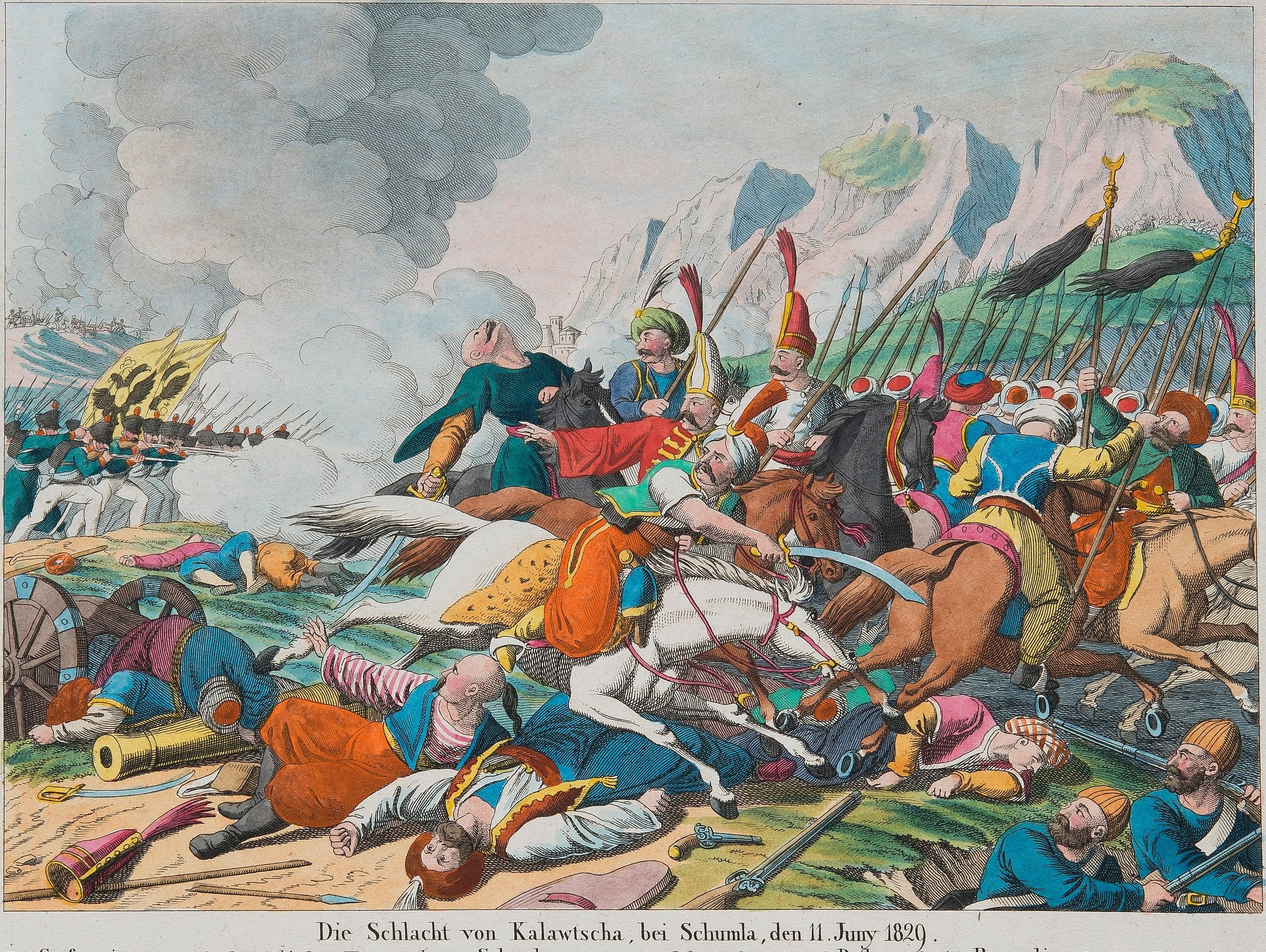
- Battle of Kulevicha
Date	11 June [O.S. 30 May] 1829
Location	Kulevicha, Ottoman Empire near present-day Kaspichan, Bulgaria; 43°15′26″N 27°6′58″E
Result	Russian victory

Belligerents
Russian Empire; Moldavia; Wallachia	Ottoman Empire

Commanders and leaders
Hans Karl von Diebitsch; Yakov Otroshchenko	Reşid Mehmed Pasha

Strength
28,000: (Note: One estimate is c. 30,000 in total): 26,000 Russian regulars; 2,000 Cossacks.; 18,000 engaged; 146 cannons	40,000: 25,000 regular infantrymen; 5,000 regular cavalrymen; 10,000 irregular cavalrymen.; unknown number engaged; 56 cannons

Casualties and losses
c. 2,000 killed (Note: By one estimate, 2,500 killed and wounded.)	>5,000 killed c. 2,000 captured (Note: By one estimate, the 5,000 casualties consisted of 3,000 killed and wounded and 2,000 captured.) almost all the artillery and the wagon train (Note: By one estimate, all 56 cannons, and all the train.)

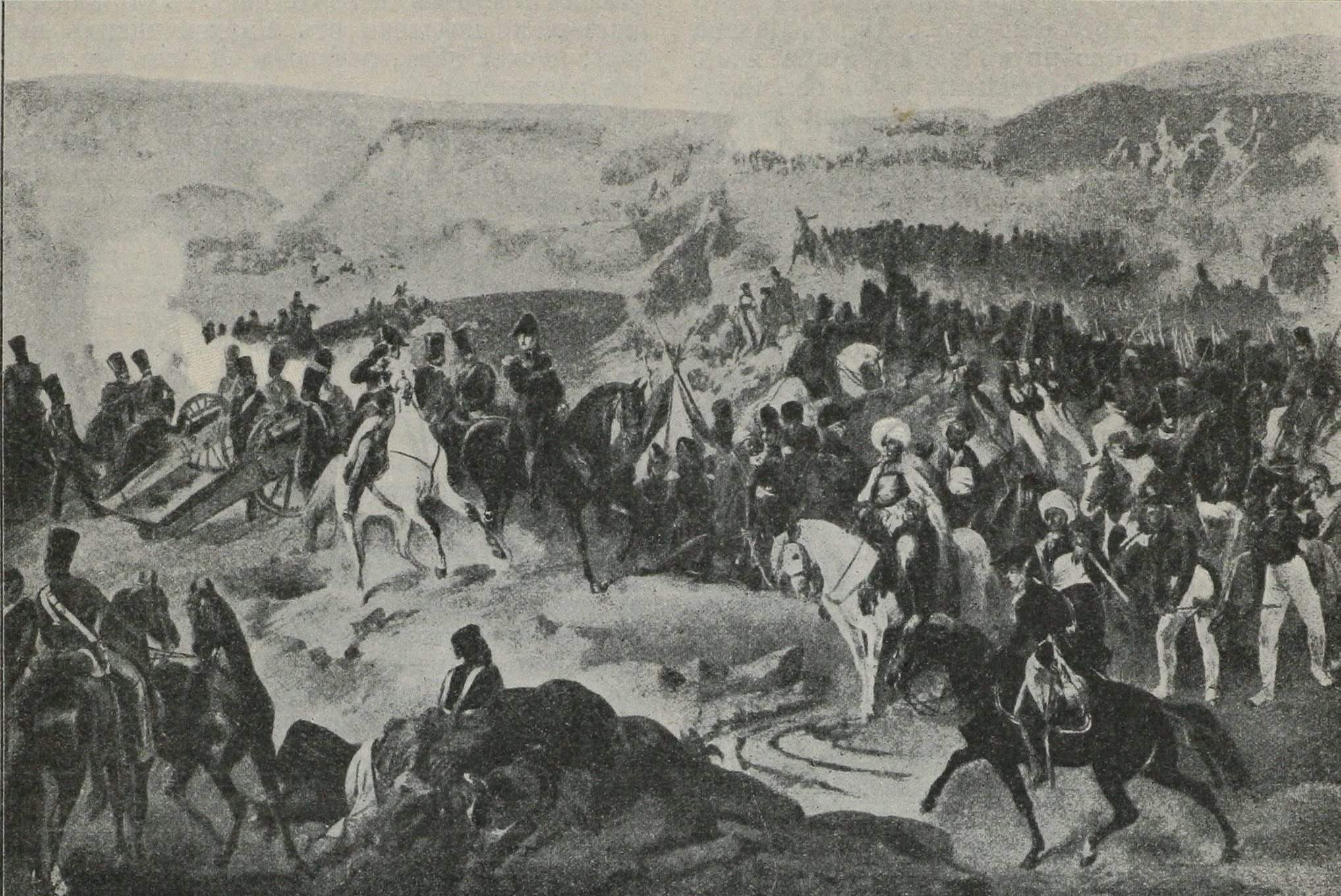
The battle by Alexander Kotzebue

The Battle of Kulevicha, also known as the Battle of Kulevcha or Kulewtscha, was fought during the Russo-Turkish War, 1828–1829, on 11 June 1829, between Russia and the Ottoman Empire. It ended with a Russian victory achieved by Commander Hans von Diebitsch (Ivan Dibich-Zabalkansky).

== Battle ==
The Russians, led by Hans Karl von Diebitsch (German-born general serving the Russian Empire), marched against the Ottomans led by Grand Vizier Reşid Mehmed Pasha (Georgian-born general enslaved as a child by the Ottomans) with the objective of relieving Silistria, 40 miles (64 km) west of the village of Kulevicha.

First Reşid Pasha with an Army's 40,000-strong main force inclusive of 56 guns came out of Shumla with the aim of defeating the Russian detachment sent under the Russian command's plan to lure the Ottomans out of this town, and assisting the besieged Ottoman troops with his active actions. Then Diebitsch, leaving part of his troops to continue the siege, with the main forces (about 30,000 people, 146 guns) moved against the Ottoman army and cut the way for its potential retreat, thus forcing Grand Vizier to give pitched battle.

In the morning of 11 June the Russian vanguard under the command of General of the Infantry Ya. O. Otroshchenko attacked his enemy and captured the heights near the village of Kulevicha, but under the onslaught of superior opponent forces was forced to abandon them, suffering losses. The Russian artillery fire and bayonet counterattacks of the Russian infantry stopped the Ottoman troops' advance. Having regrouped the forces by this evening (the Russian troops participating in the battle numbered ca. 18,000 men; how many Ottoman troops participated is not stated in the source used), supported by artillery fire, the Russian army went on the offensive and, having turned the Ottoman troops into flight, pursued them for about 8 kilometres (5.0 mi).

The Russians were victorious as the Turks got trapped in a valley suffering heavy casualties before they managed to withdraw. General Diebitsch then headed towards Adrianople.

The Ottoman force was tasked with various different objectives in Bulgaria, most notably the suppression of Hadjuk revolts, however several other more important duties were tasked to the Ottoman force such as relieving Silistria of constant battle and preventing further Russian advancements into Bulgaria.

== Sources ==
- Jaques, T.; Showalter, D.E. (2007). Dictionary of Battles and Sieges: F-O. Dictionary of Battles and Sieges: A Guide to 8,500 Battles from Antiquity Through the Twenty-first Century. Greenwood Press. ISBN 978-0-313-33538-9.
- Bodart, Gaston (1908). Militär-historisches Kriegs-Lexikon (1618–1905). Vienna and Leipzig: C. W. Stern.
