= Alexander von Kotzebue =

German Romantic painter (1815–1889)

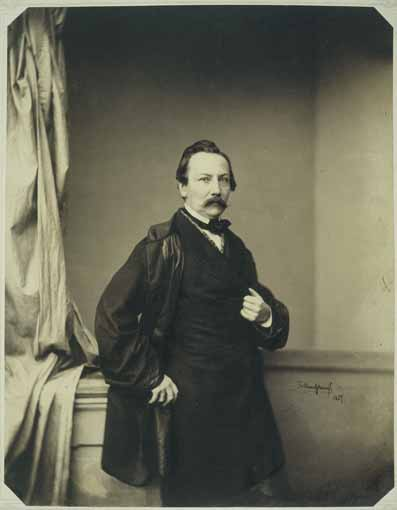
- Von Kotzebue in 1857
- Born: May 28, 1815; Königsberg
- Died: August 12, 1889 (aged 74); Munich
- Education: Member Academy of Arts (1850); Professor by rank (1858)
- Alma mater: Imperial Academy of Arts (1844)
- Known for: Painting
- Awards: Big Gold Medal of the Imperial Academy of Arts (1844)

Alexander Friedrich Wilhelm Franz von Kotzebue or Alexander Yevstafiyevich Kotzebue (Russian: Александр Евстафиевич Коцебу, romanized: Aleksandr Yevstafiyevich Kotsebu; 9 June 1815 – 24 August 1889) was a German Romantic painter of historical scenes and battle scenes.

== Life ==
Alexander von Kotzebue was the son of the playwright August von Kotzebue. He was born in Königsberg. On August's death in 1819, Alexander was educated in the Cadet Corps in St Petersburg, leaving it in 1834 as a Gardeleutnant. However, four years later, in 1838, he moved to an artistic career and began his artistic training at the St Petersburg Academy under Alexander Sauerweid. He spent six years at the St Petersburg Academy and at the end of them, in 1844, exhibited his first painting, The Storming of Warsaw, in St Petersburg.

He then went to continue his studies in Paris in 1846 and to Belgium, the Netherlands, Italy and Germany in 1848, before finally settling in Munich. There he became imperial professor of Russian and an honorary member of the Academy of Fine Arts Munich.

He painted several large-scale works for the Russian tsar of Russian battles in the Seven Years' War and the campaigns of Alexander Suvorov. The most important of these are considered to be the Storming of Schlüsselburg, Battle of Poltawa, Storming of Narva, Crossing of the Devil's Bridge and Founding of St Petersburg (Maximilianeum, Munich). Kotzebue died in Munich and is buried there in the Alter Südfriedhof.

== Gallery ==
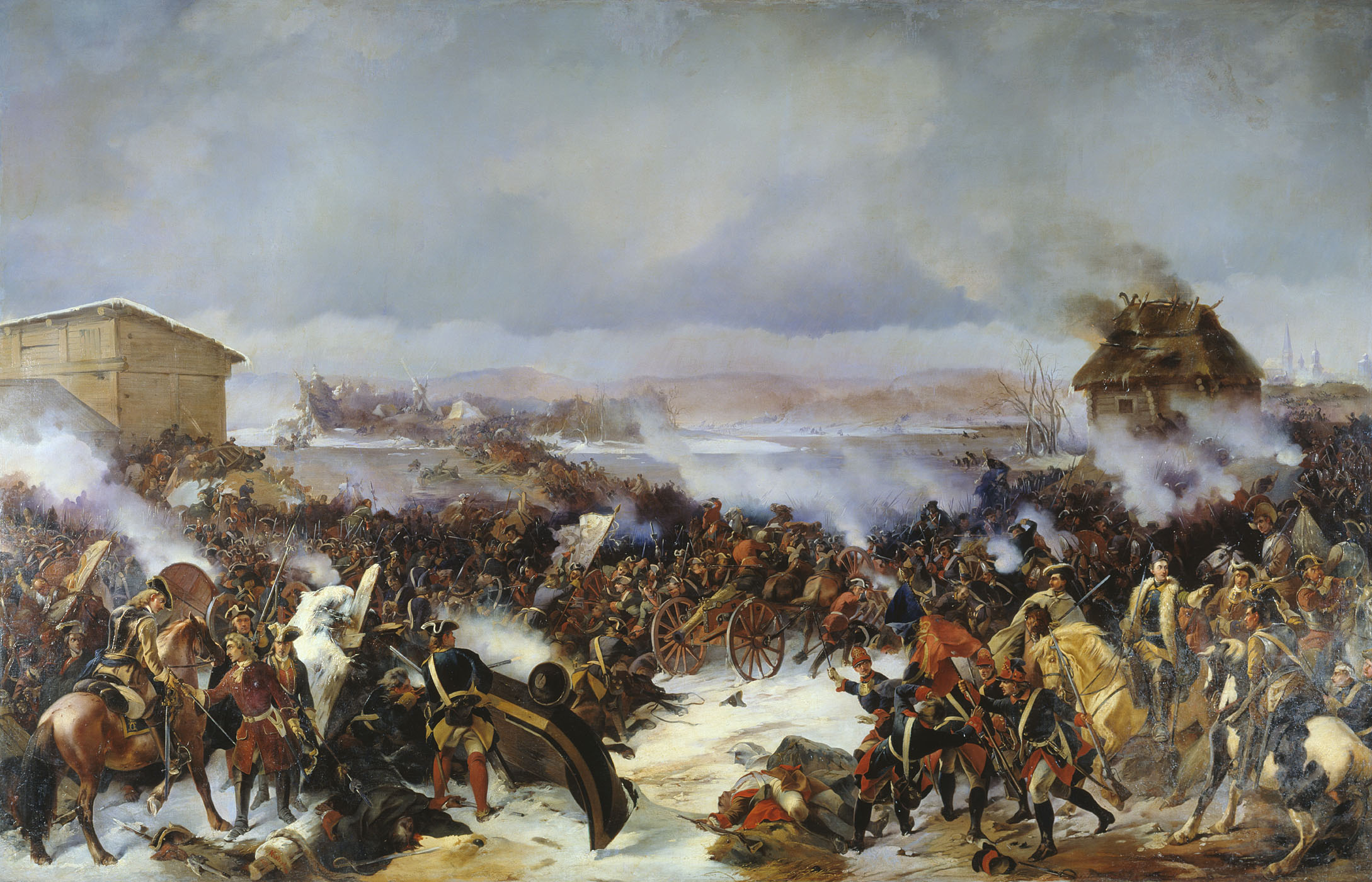
The Battle of Narva

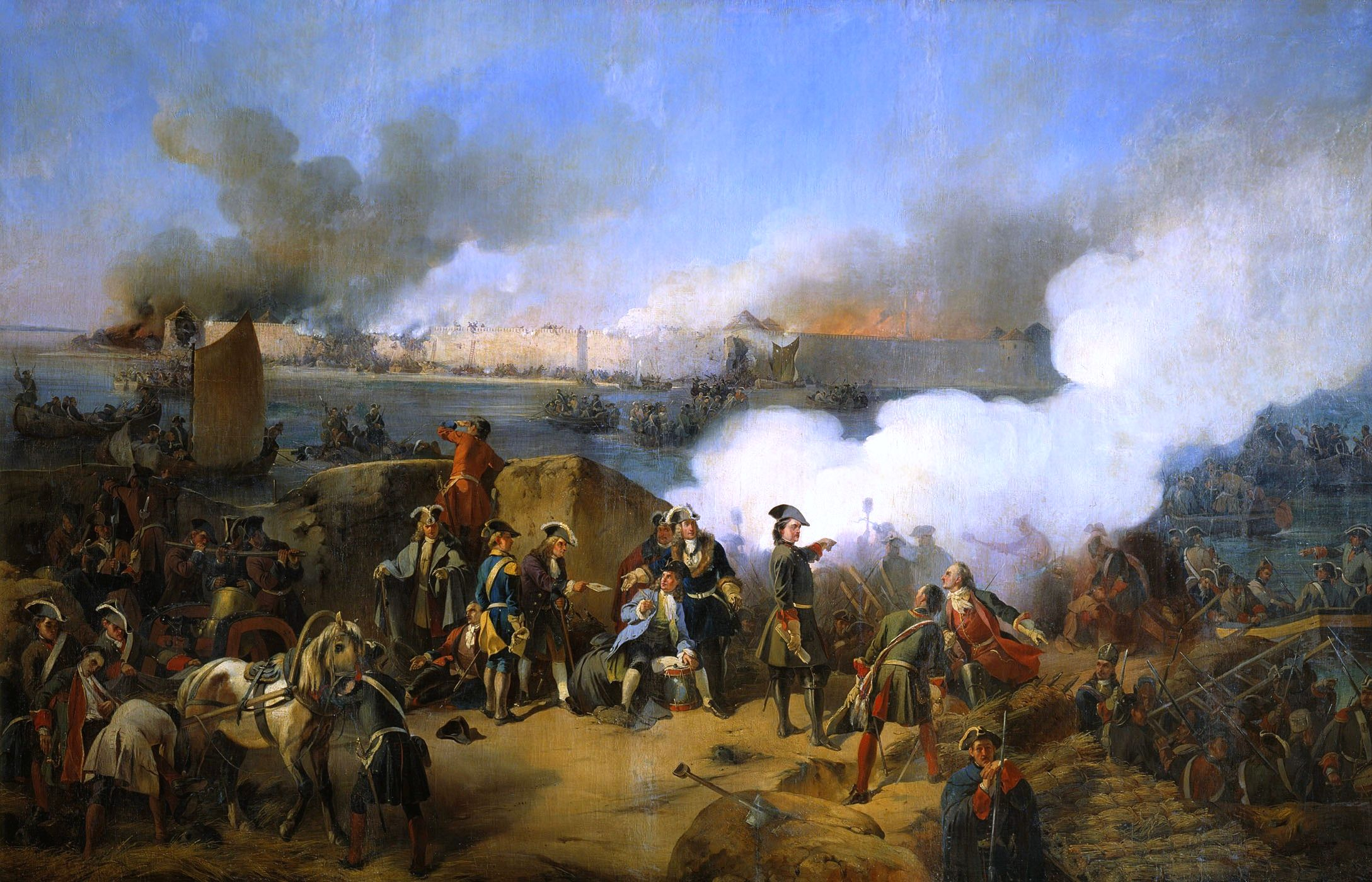
The Storming of Nöteborg

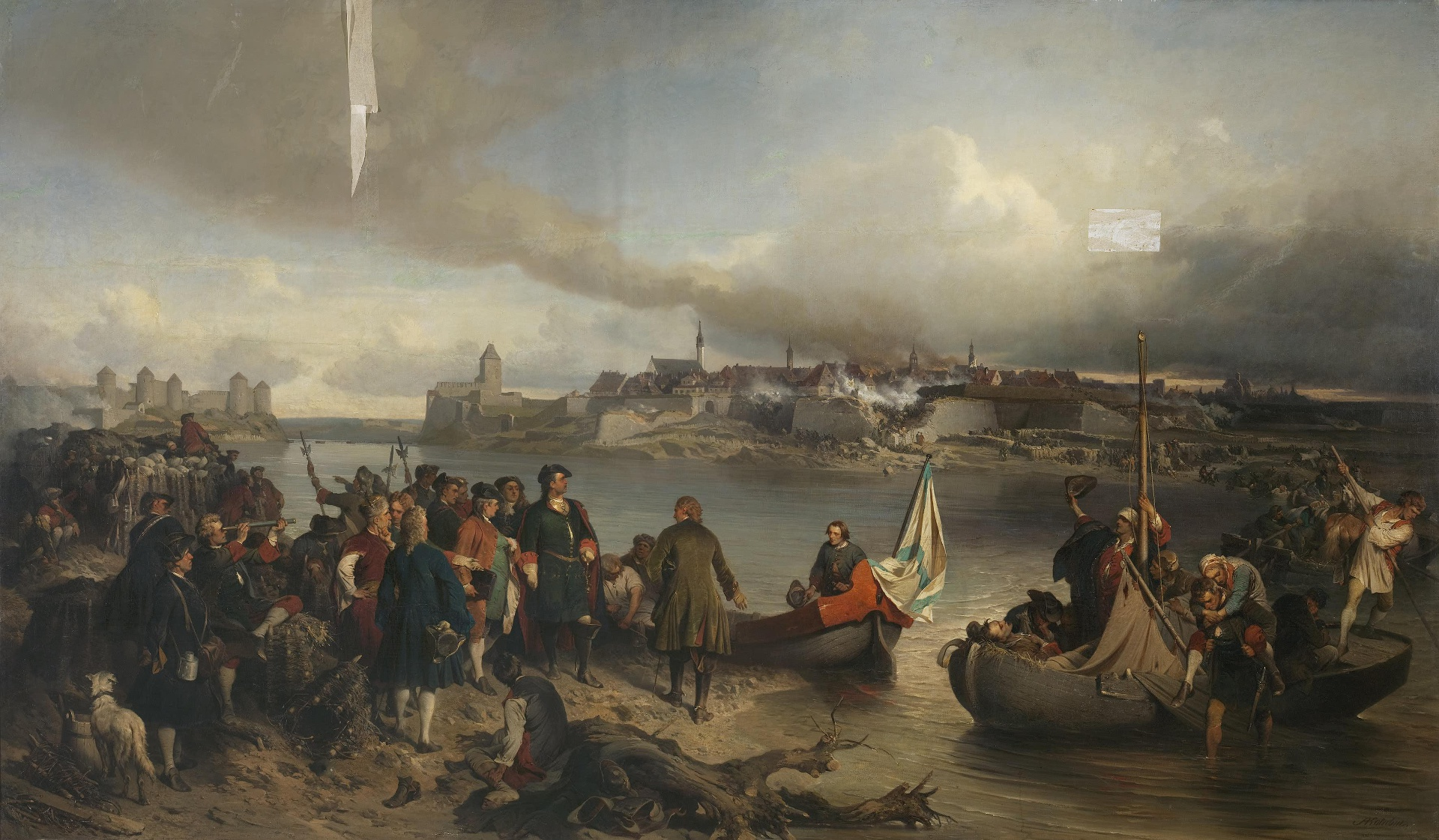
The Capture of Narva

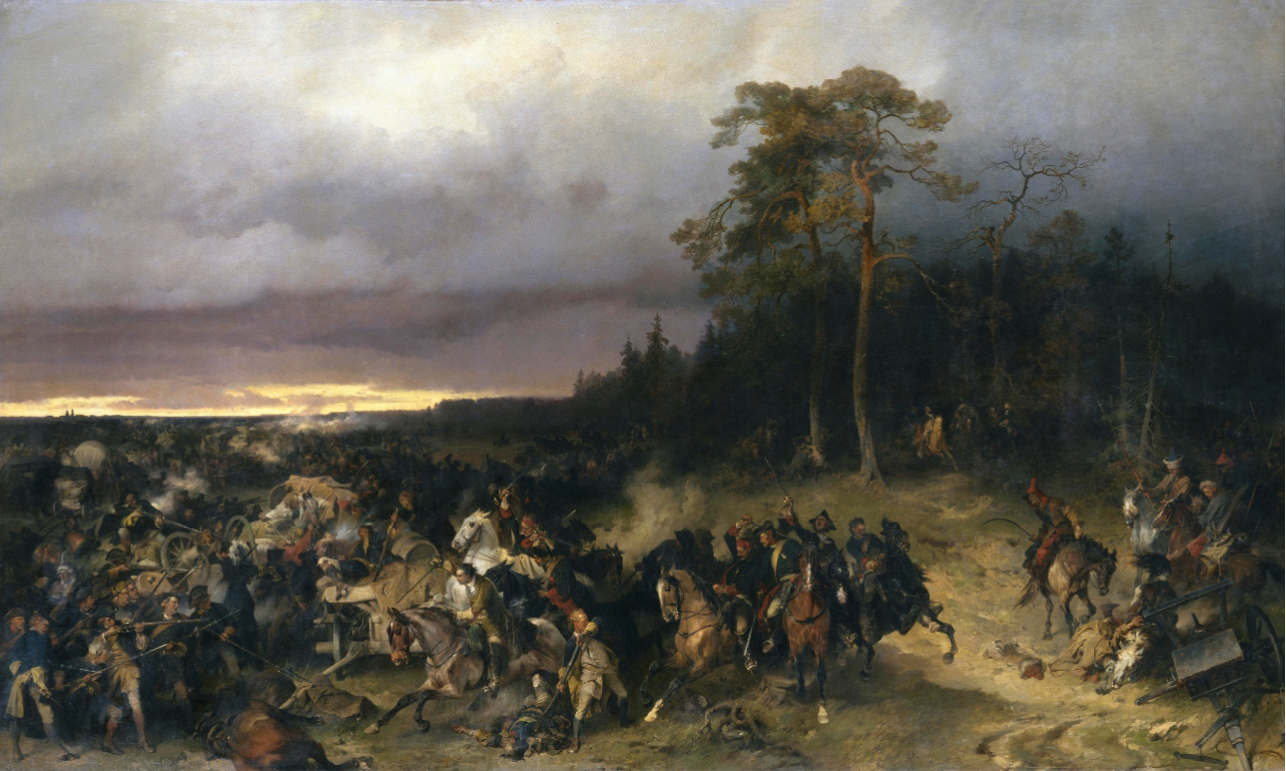
The Battle of Lesnaya

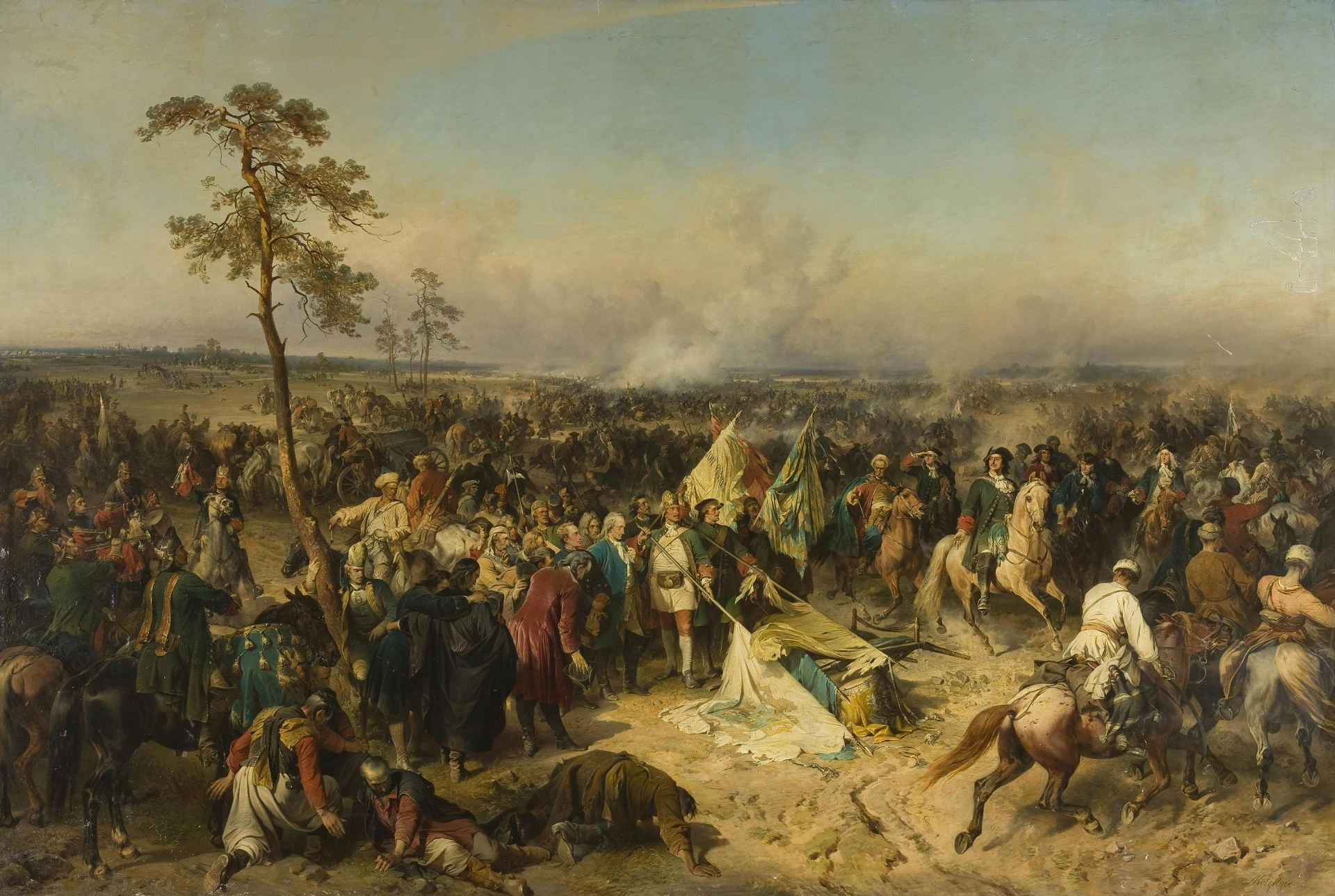
The Russian Victory at Poltava

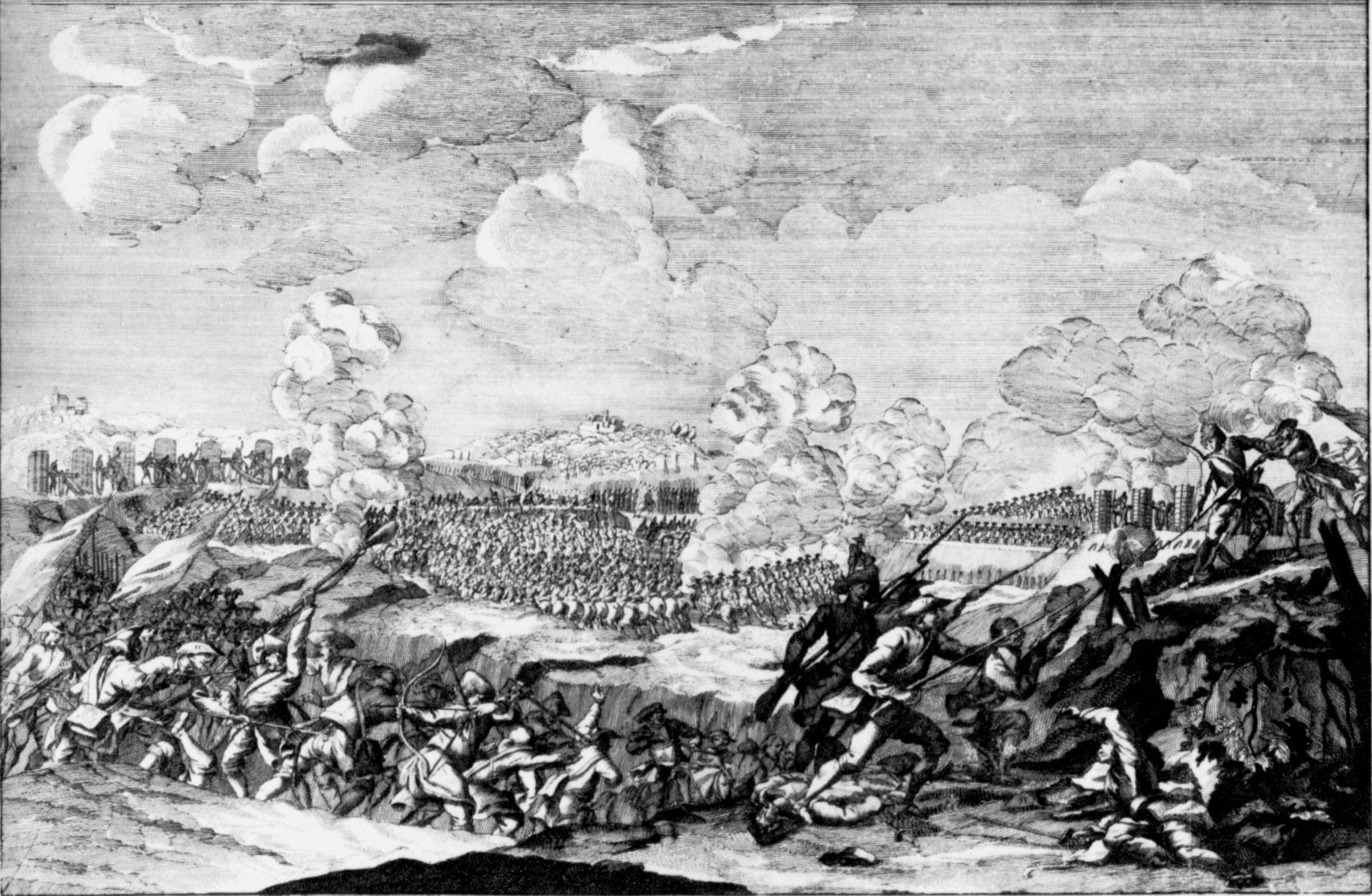
The Battle of Gross-Jägersdorf

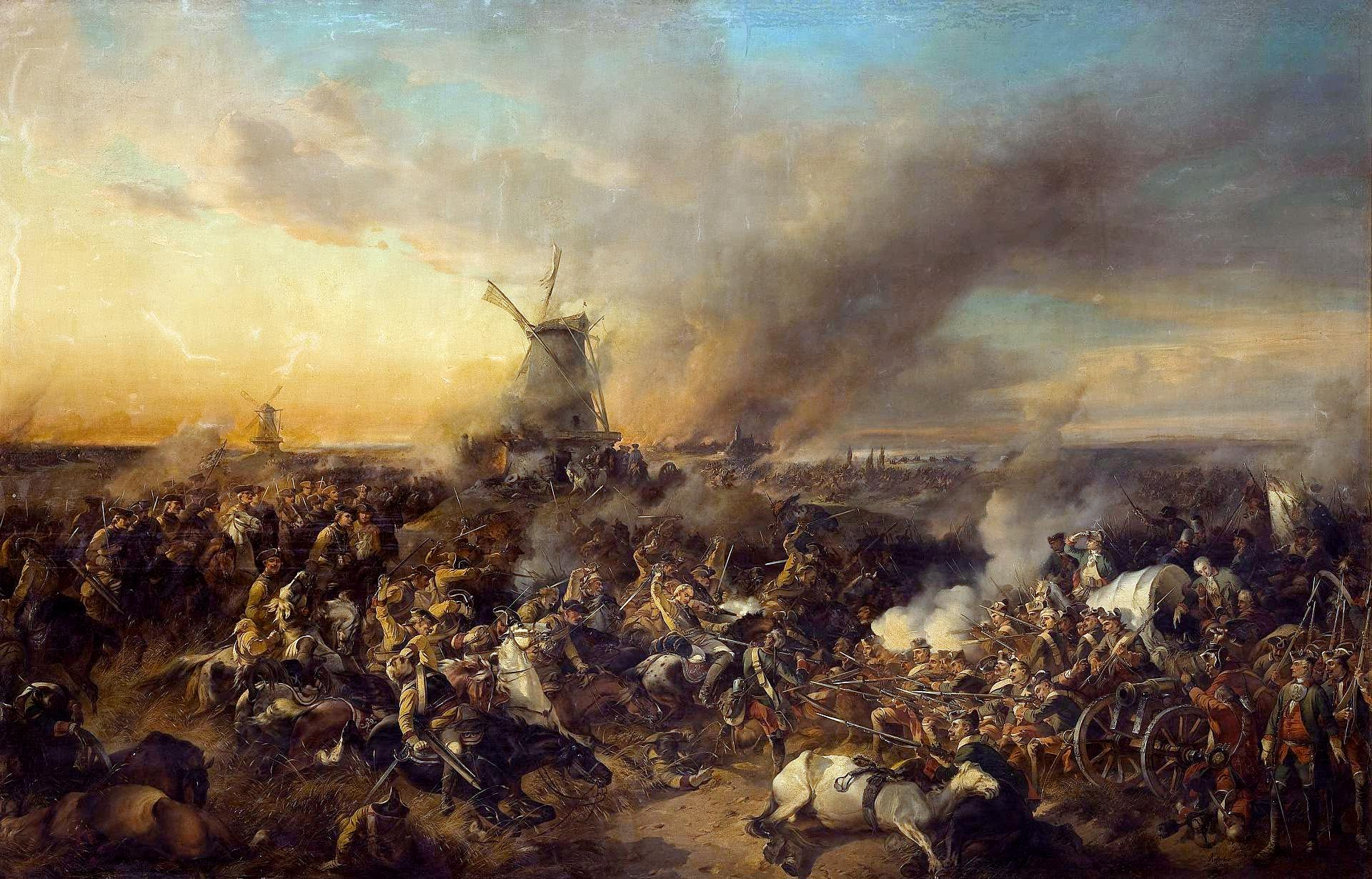
The Battle of Zorndorf

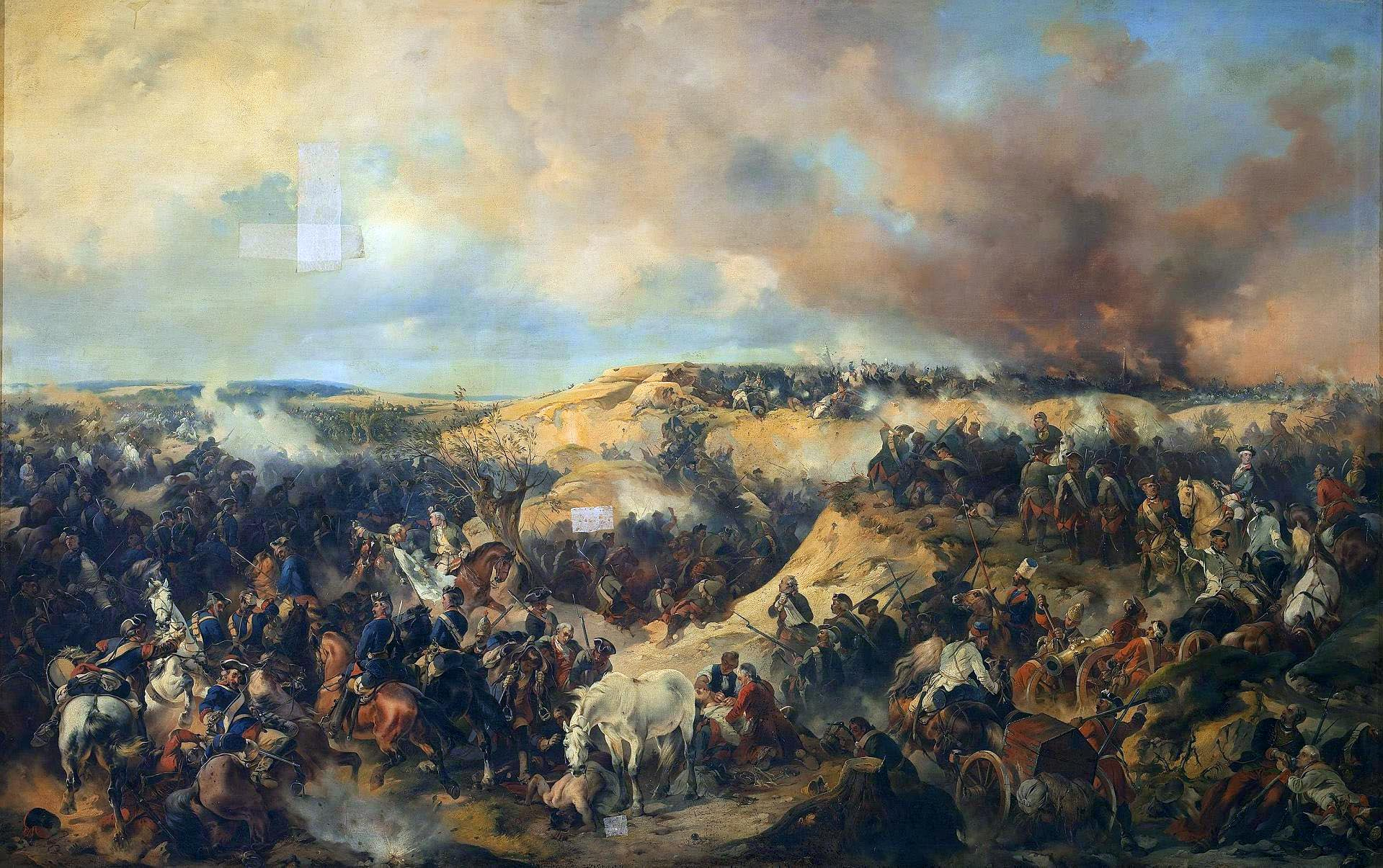
The Battle of Kunersdorf

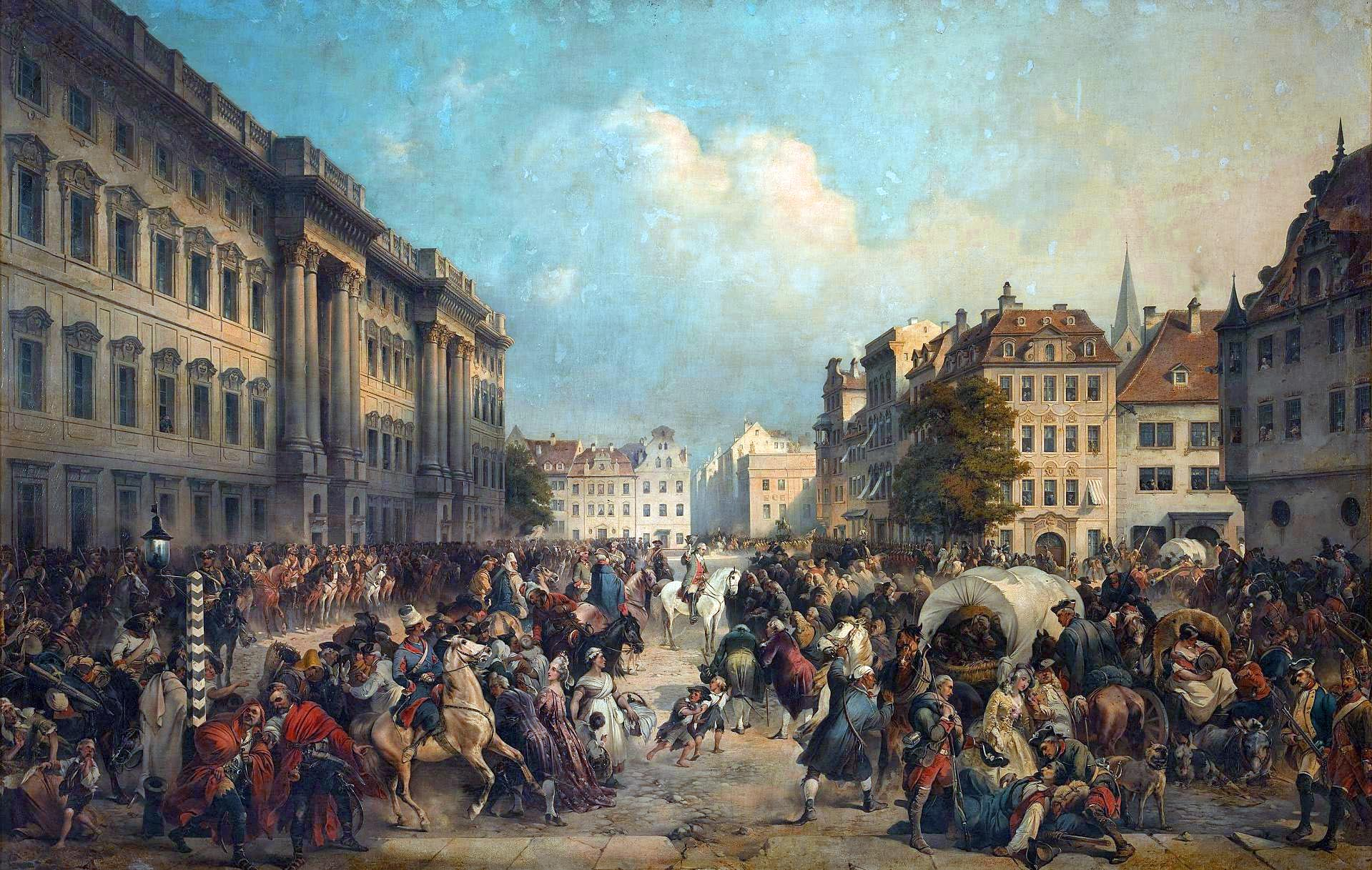
The Raid on Berlin

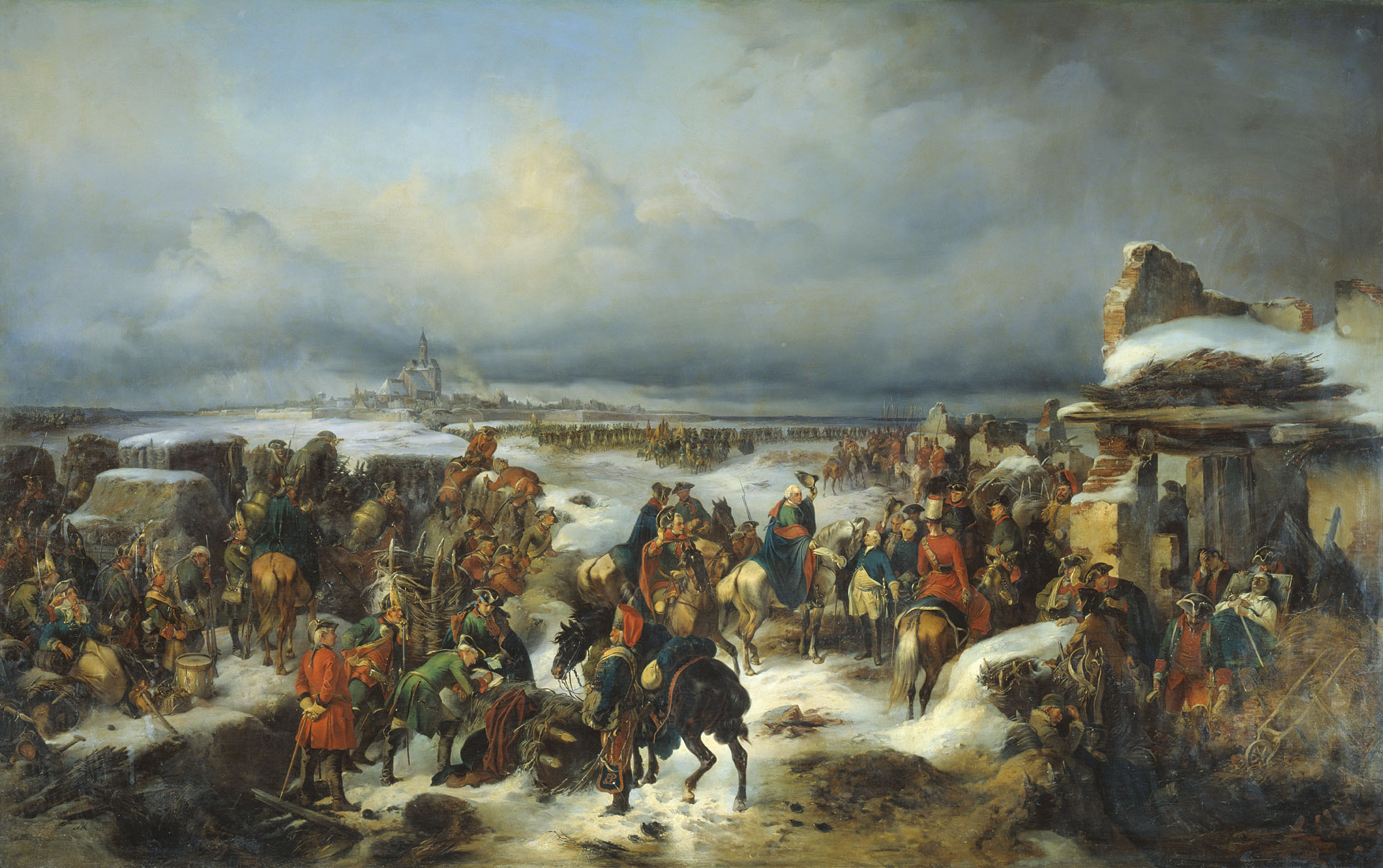
The Fall of Kolberg

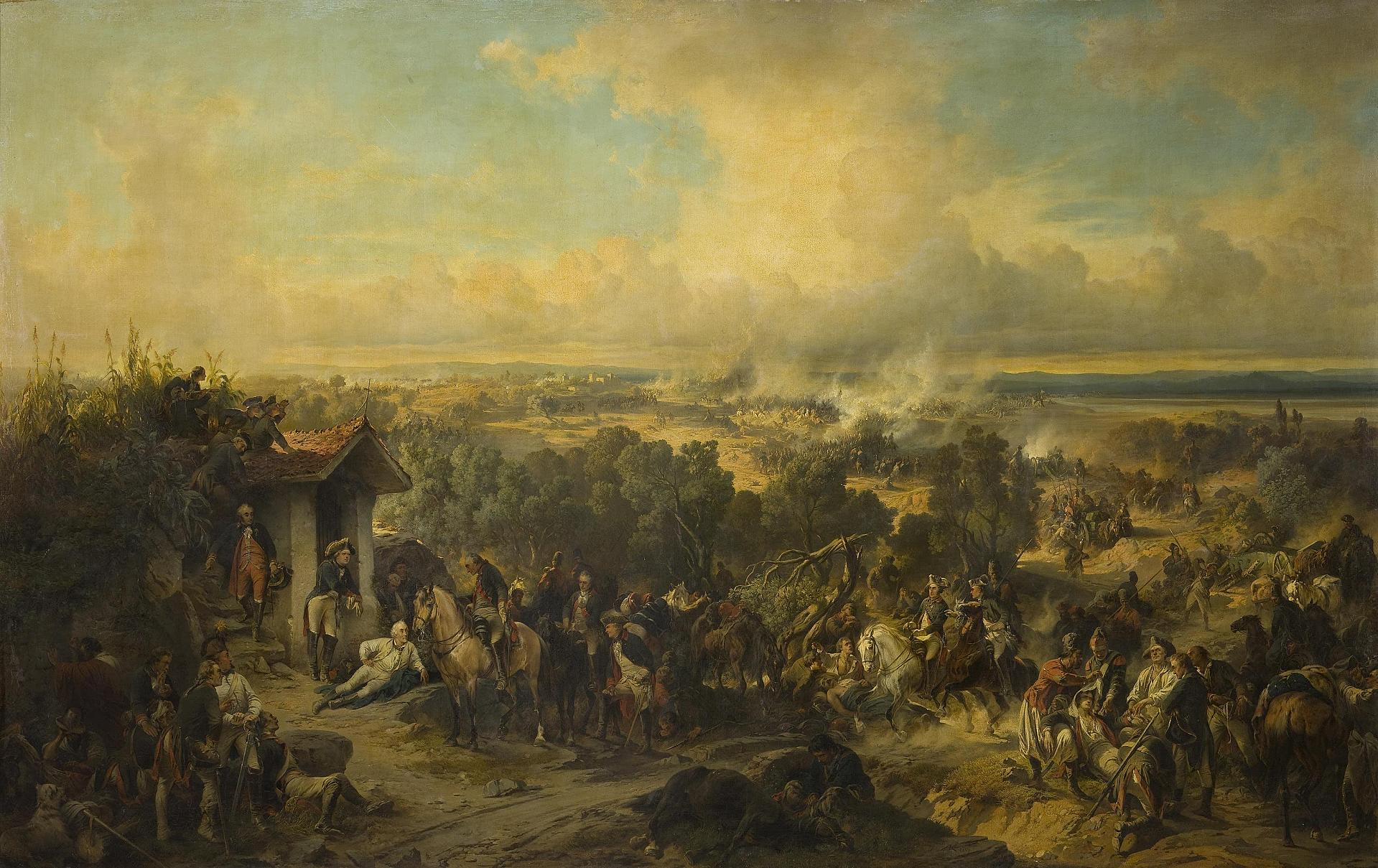
The Battle of the Trebbia

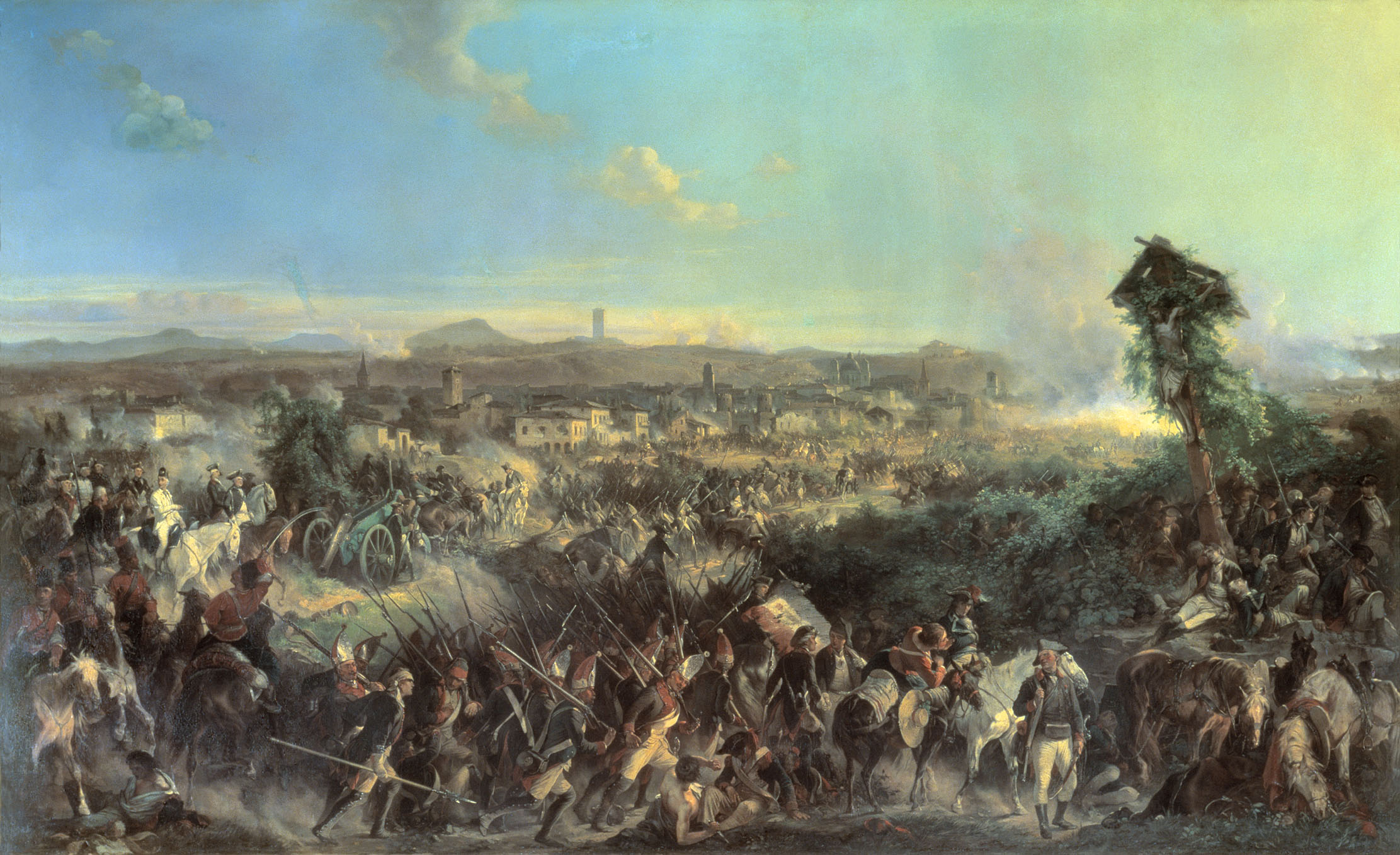
The Battle of Novi

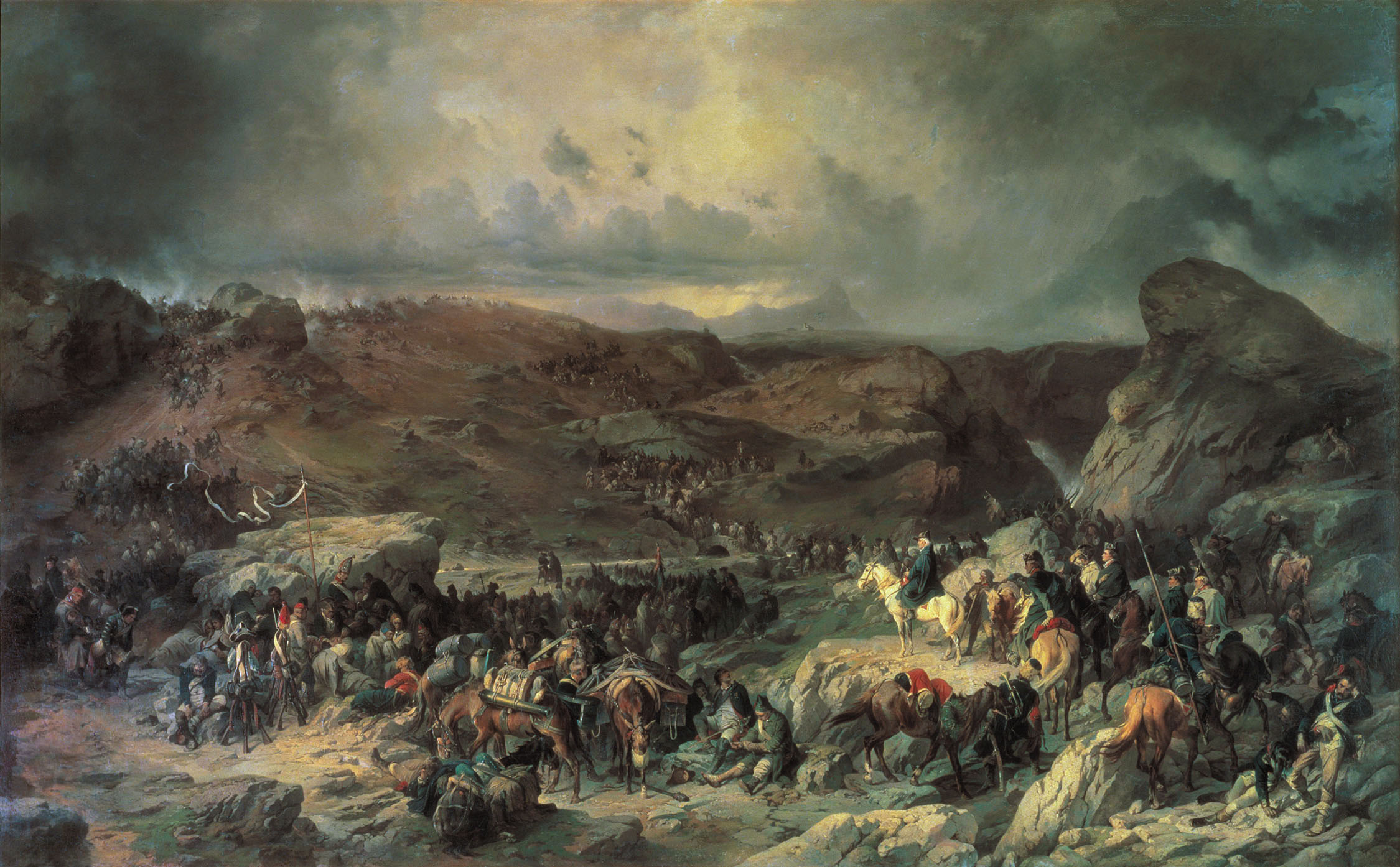
The Crossing of the Gotthard Pass

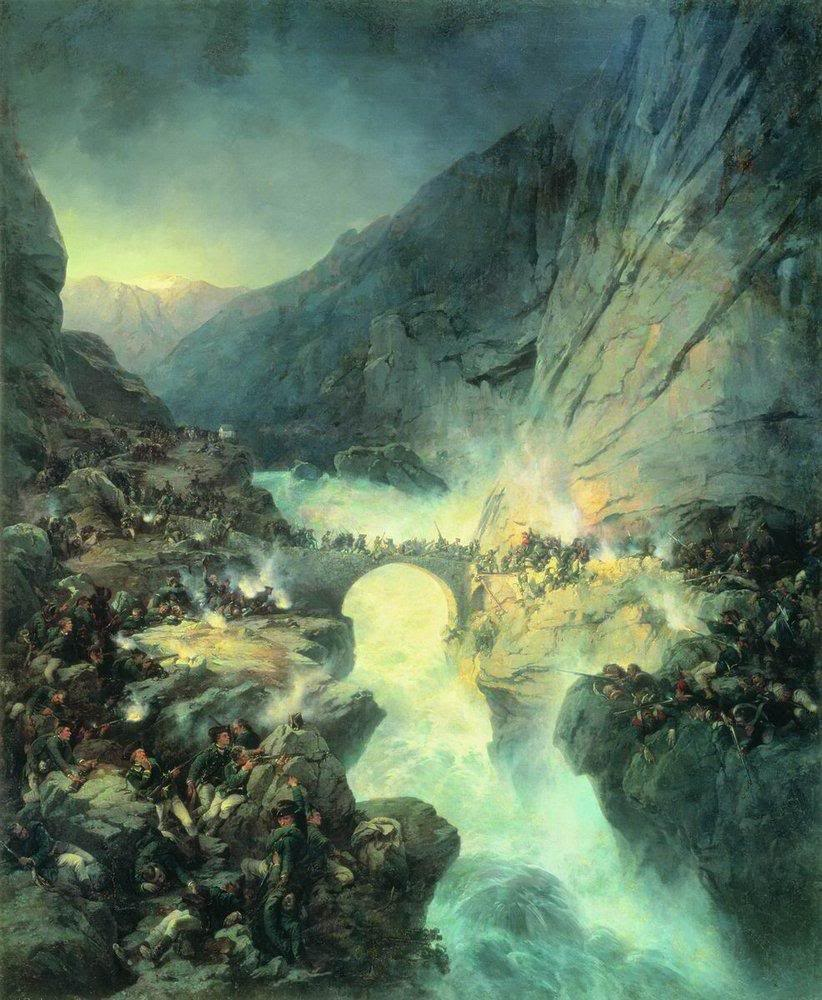
The Battle of Devil's Bridge

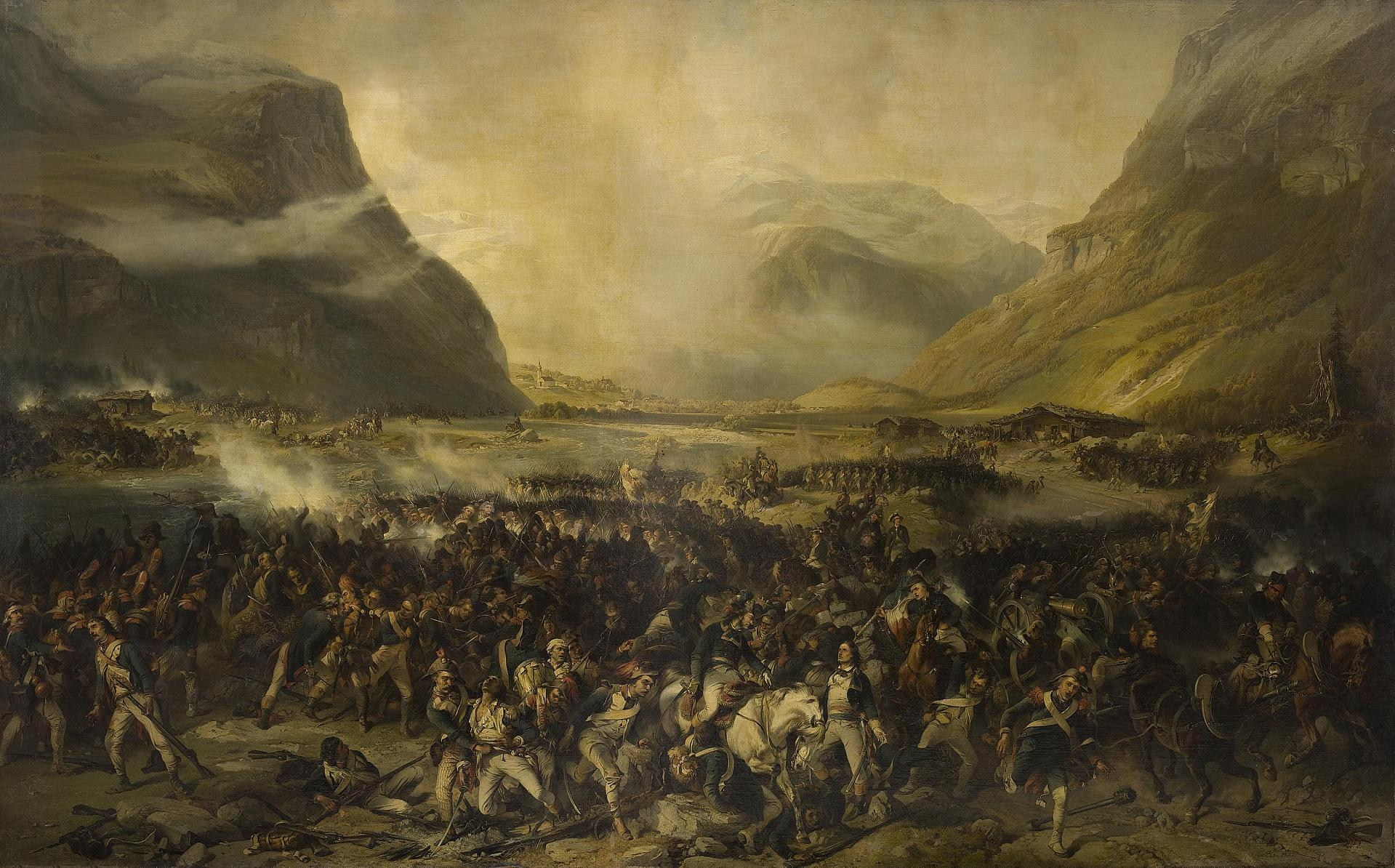
The Battle of the Muottental

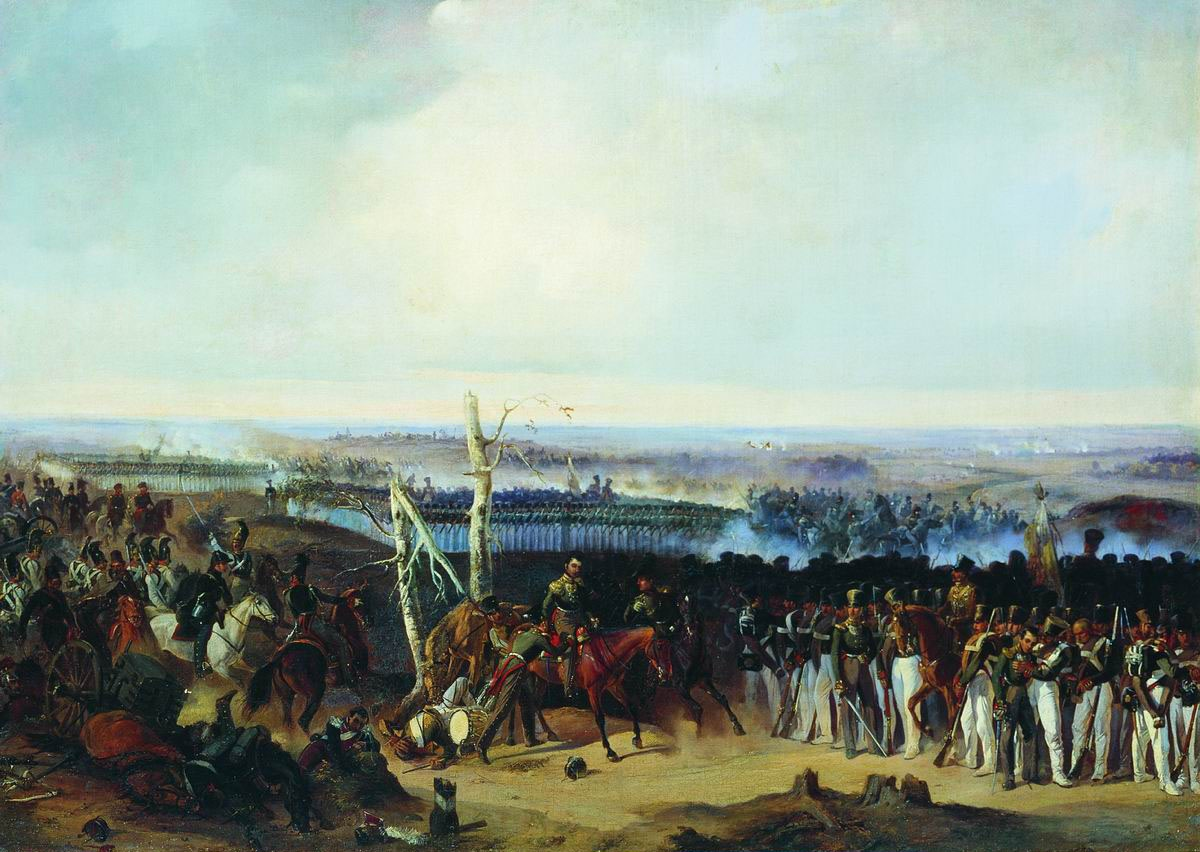
The Battle of Borodino (Izmailovsky Life Guards Regiment)

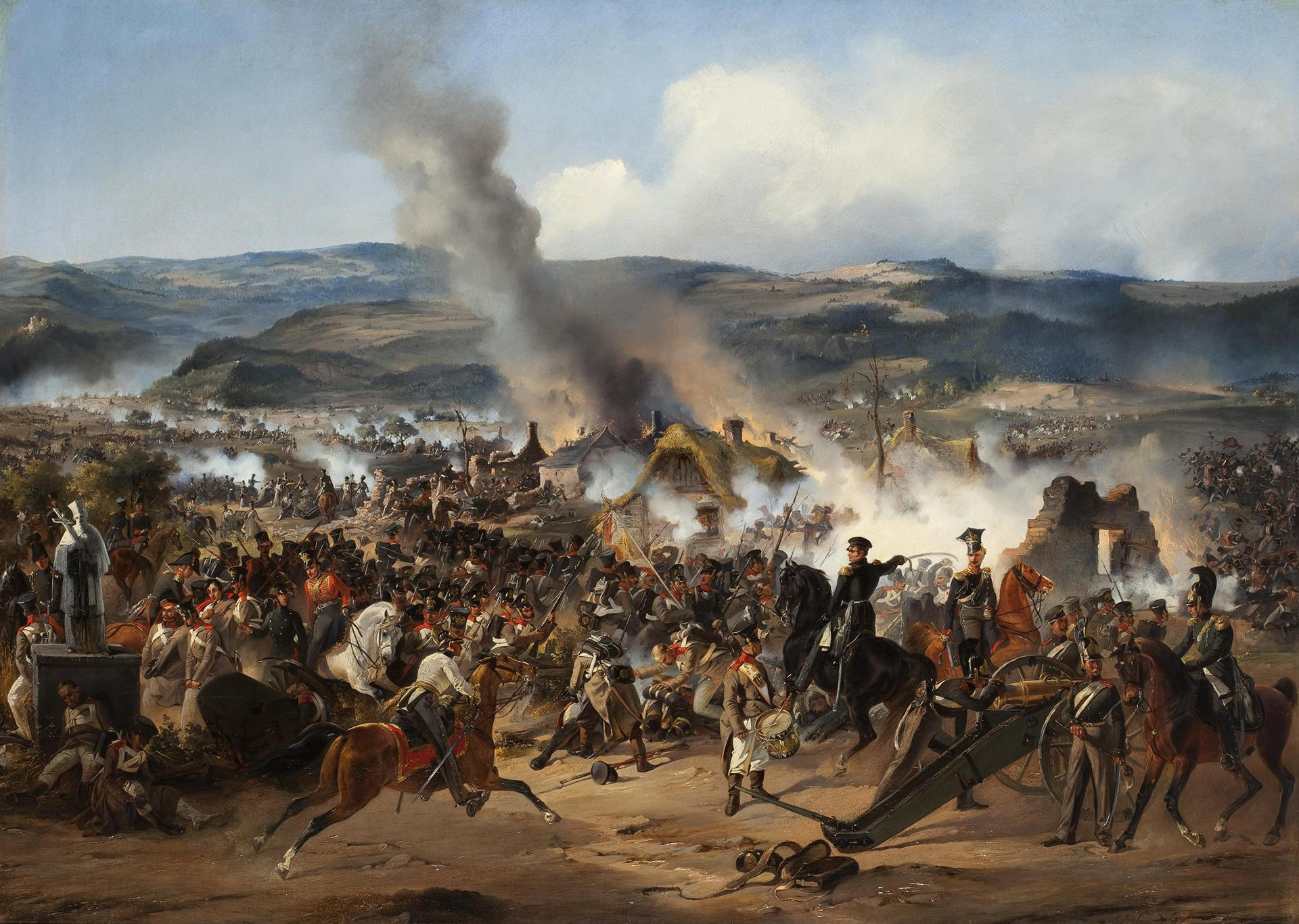
The Battle of Kulm

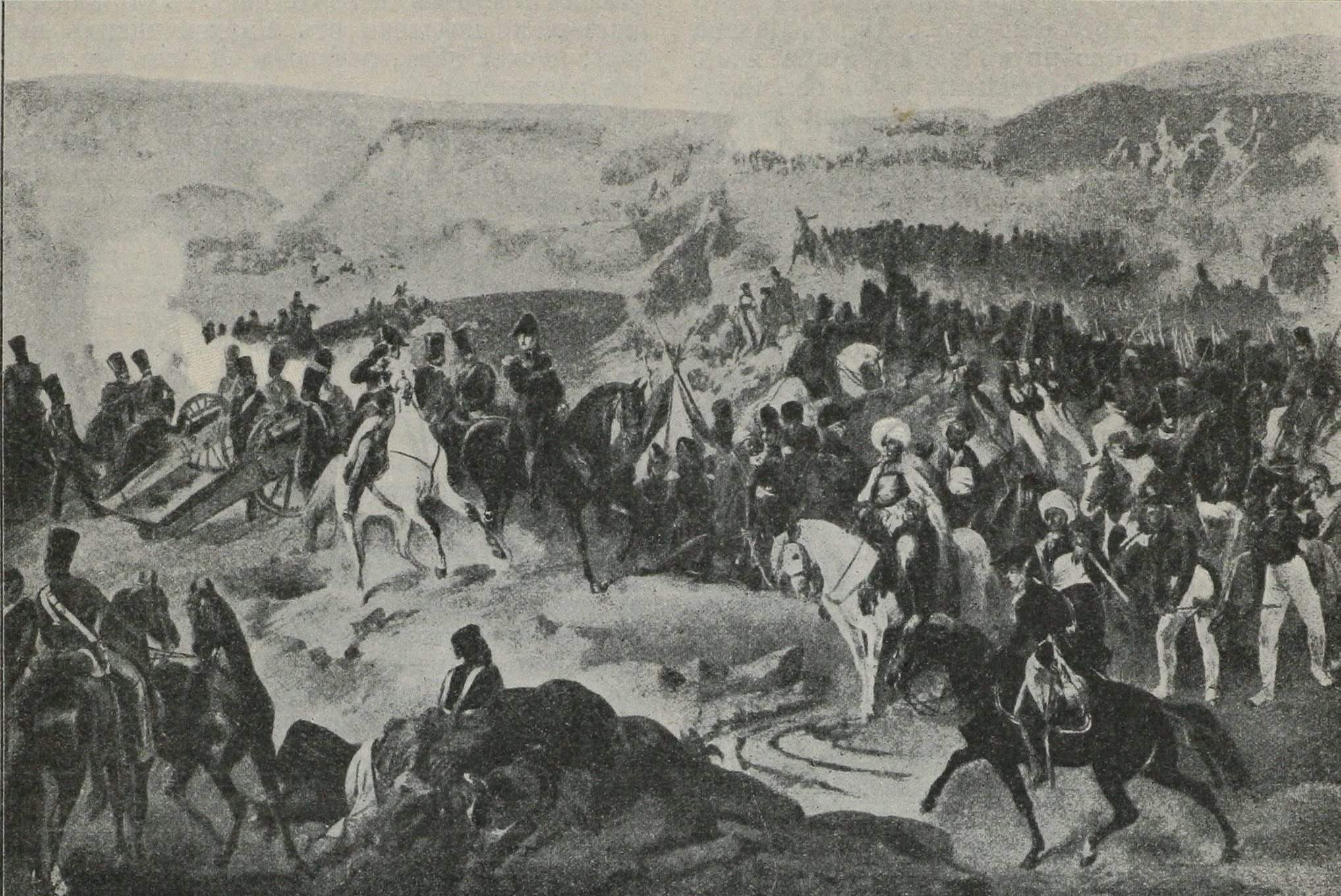
The Battle of Kulevicha

== Sources ==
- "Коцебу, Александр Евстафиевич" . Brockhaus and Efron Encyclopedic Dictionary (in Russian). 1906.
- Sylva van der Heyden: "Kotzebue, (August) Alexander Evstafievich" by Alexander Ferdinand Wilhelm Franz In: France Nerlich and Bénédicte Savoy (Eds.), Pariser Lehrjahre. Ein Lexikon zur Ausbildung deutscher Maler in der französischen Hauptstadt. Vol.2: 1844–1870. De Gruyter, Berlin/Boston 2015 ISBN 978-3-11-031477-9
- Rostislav von Kotzebue, Geschichte und Genealogie der Familie Kotzebue, Harvas 1984 ISBN 978-2-903118-11-2
