= Löwenwolde =

Löwenwolde (Левенвольде, Lehvenvold) may refer to

- Löwenwolde, Baltic German name of Liigvalla, Estonia
- Löwenwolde's Treaty (1732), Austro-Prusso-Russian treaty regarding the Polish succession
- Gerhard Johann von Löwenwolde (died 1721), Saxon and Russian diplomat and governor-general of Russian Livonia (1710-1713)
- Karl Gustav von Löwenwolde (died 1735), Russian diplomat and military commander
