= Izmailovsky Life Guards Regiment =

Izmaylovsky Lifeguard Regiment — III —
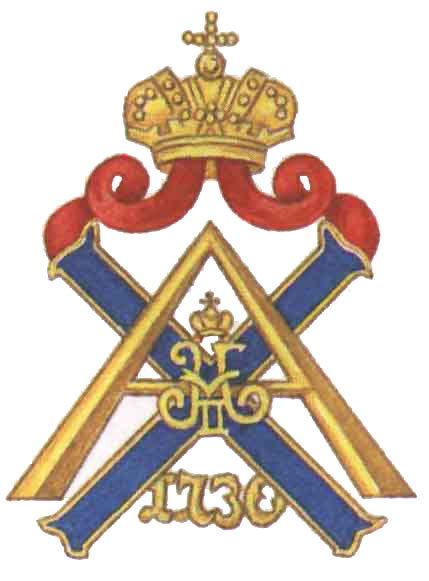
- Badge of the regiment
- Active: 22 September 1730 – 1917
- Country: Russian Empire
- Branch: Army
- Type: Infantry
- Size: Regiment
- Garrison/HQ: St. Petersburg

Insignia
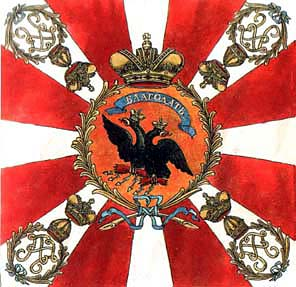
- Banner of the regiment

The Izmaylovsky Regiment (Russian: Изма́йловский лейб-гва́рдии полк, romanized: Izmáylovskiy leyb-gvárdii polk), also Izmailovsky, was one of the oldest regiments of the Imperial Russian Army, a subdivision of the 1st Guards Infantry Division of the Imperial Russian Guard. It was formed in Moscow on 22 September 1730 as Empress Anna's personal life guards (leib guard), named after the Romanov ancestral estate of Izmaylovo.

The first colonel of the regiment that was appointed was Adjutant general Count Karl Gustav von Löwenwolde. After him, only members of the imperial family were appointed chiefs of the regiment.

On 17 March 1800, the regiment was renamed to Lifeguards of His Imperial Highness Konstantin Pavlovich (Лейб-гвардии Его Императорского Высочества Константина Павловича), and then on 28 May of the same year to Lifeguard of His Imperial Highness Nikolai Pavlovich (Лейб-гвардии Его Императорского Высочества Николая Павловича).

The original name was restored in 1801. The regimental church was Trinity Cathedral, Saint Petersburg, where its military ensigns were kept.

== Timeline ==
- 1737 – the first time that the Izmaylovsky Regiment saw active service, when a battalion led by Lieutenant Colonel Gustav von Biron fought in the Russo-Turkish War; under the command of Field Marshal Burkhard Christoph von Münnich. This battalion was the first Russian unit to enter the Turkish fortress of Ochakov. In recognition of this action the regiment was awarded a set of silver trumpets, though not until 1857.
- 1742 – Russo-Swedish War
- 1762 – The regiment played a decisive role in the palace coup which placed Catherine on the throne as Empress Regnant of Russia, as the first of the guards regiments to answer her appeal for protection against her husband the Emperor.
- 1788 – Ochakov, Bendery, Brailov
- 1790 – Russo-Swedish War
- 1795 – Leopold I of Belgium appointed as a colonel at the age of five
- 1805 – Austerlitz
- 1807 – Friedland
- 1808 – Finnish War
- 1812 – Borodino
- 1813 – Lützen, Bautzen, Kulm, Leipzig
- 1828–1829 – Russo-Turkish War
- 1831 – Polish campaign
- 1863–1864 – Polish campaign
- 1878–1879 – Russo-Turkish war
- 1914 – First World War

== Ceremonial chiefs ==
- 22 September 1730 – 30 April 1735 – Count Karl Gustav von Löwenwolde
- 30 April 1735 – 17 October 1740 – Empress Anna Ivanovna
- 17 October 1740 – 25 November 1741 – Emperor Ivan VI of Russia
- 25 November 1741 – 25 December 1761 – Empress Yelizaveta Petrovna
- 25 December 1761 – 28 June 1762 – Emperor Pyotr III
- 28 June 1762 – 6 November 1796 – Empress Ekaterina II
- 7 November 1796 – 10 November 1796 – Emperor Pavel I
- 10 November 1796 – 28 May 1800 – Grand Prince Konstantin Pavlovich
- 28 May 1800 – 18 February 1855 – Grand Prince (then Emperor) Nicholas I
- 19 February 1855 – 1 March 1881 – Emperor Alexander II
- 2 March 1881 – 21 October 1894 – Emperor Alexander III (as a 2nd chief from 28 October 1866)
- 2 November 1894 – 1917 – Emperor Nicholas II

== Uniforms and physical appearance ==
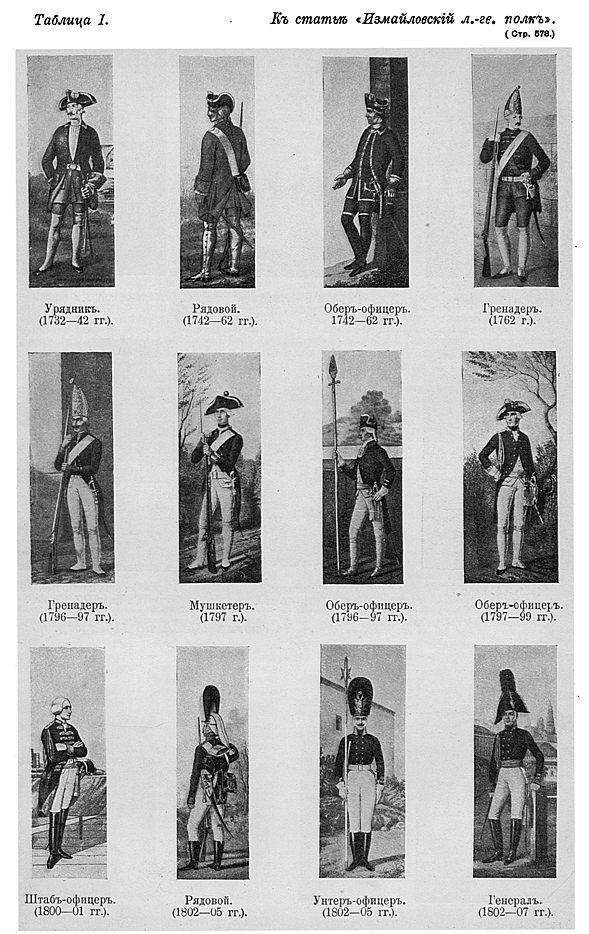
Izmaylovsky Regiment

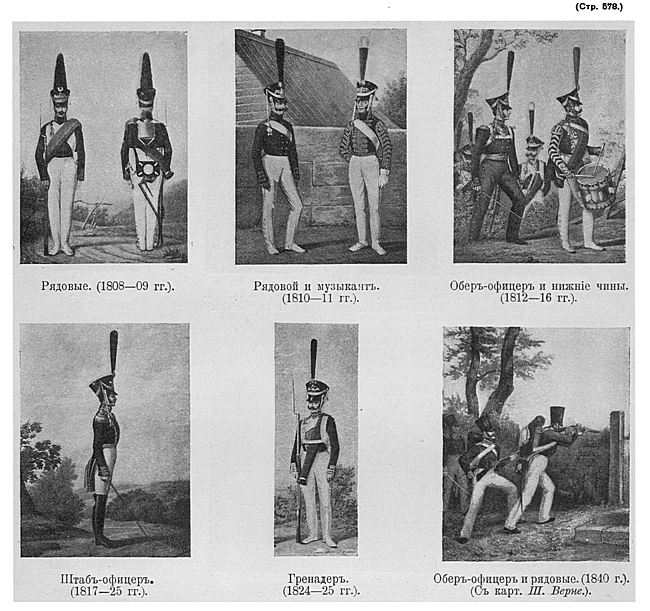
Izmaylovsky Regiment

Throughout its history under the Russian Empire, the regiment wore the standard uniform of the Infantry of the Imperial Guard, which from 1683 to 1914 was predominantly of a dark green (eventually verging on black) colour. The main distinctions of the Izmaylovsky Regiment were the red facings (plastron, cuffs and shoulder straps) edged in white piping. Collars were of the same dark green as the tunic; piped in red and worn with distinctive regimental patterns of braid (litzen). In addition, the tsar's monogram appeared on the soldiers' shoulder straps and officers' epaulettes. In 1912, in recognition of its long and distinguished record, officers of the regiment were authorised to wear a large metal gorget of a design dating from 1732.

A peculiarity of the Russian Imperial Guard was that recruits for most regiments were required to meet certain criteria of physical appearance, in order to provide a standardised appearance on parade. This tradition was taken so seriously that during the 19th century the tsar himself might make the selection from a line of new recruits, chalking the regimental initial on the coat of each recruit. For the Izmaylovsky Regiment conscripts were selected on the basis of their hair colour (brown), and beards (the latter being required for the first company of each battalion only).
