= Hans Karl von Diebitsch =

German-born Russian commander (1785–1831)

Graf Hans Karl von Diebitsch Sabalkanski
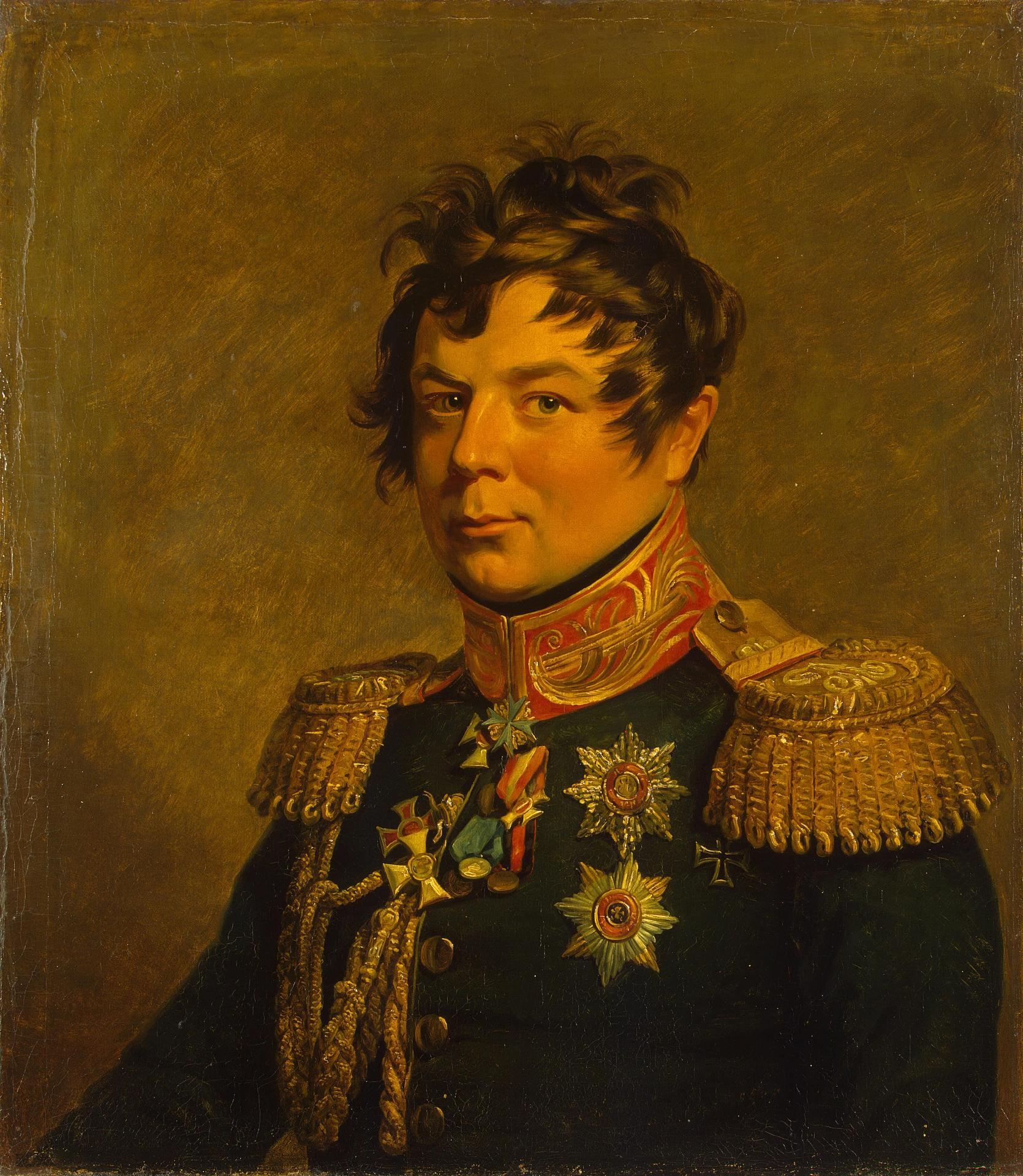
- Portrait by George Dawe, Military Gallery of the Winter Palace, 1821–1825.
- Born: 13 May 1785; Groß Leipe, Kingdom of Prussia
- Died: 10 June 1831 (aged 46); Kleszewo, Kingdom of Poland, Russian Empire
- Other names: Ivan Ivanovich Dibich-Zabalkansky; Ivan Ivanovich Diebitsch
- Military career
- Allegiance: Russia
- Branch: Imperial Russian Army
- Service years: 1801–1831
- Rank: Field marshal
- Conflicts: War of the Third Coalition; Battle of Austerlitz; War of the Fourth Coalition; Battle of Eylau; Battle of Heilsberg; Battle of Friedland; French invasion of Russia; Second Battle of Polotsk; War of the Sixth Coalition; Battle of Lützen; Battle of Dresden; Battle of Leipzig; Russo-Turkish War (1828–1829); Siege of Silistra; Battle of Kulevicha; Battle of Sliven; November Uprising; First Battle of Wawer; Battle of Olszynka Grochowska; Battle of Ostrołęka
- Awards: Order of St. George; Pour le Mérite; Order of the Red Eagle; Order of St. Vladimir; Order of Saint Anna; Order of Saint Alexander Nevsky; Order of Leopold (Austria); Kulm Cross; Gold Sword for Bravery; Order of the White Eagle; Military Order of Maria Theresa

Hans Karl Friedrich Anton Graf von Diebitsch-Sabalkanski und Narten (Russian: Иван Иванович Дибич-Забалканский, romanized: Ivan Ivanovich Dibich-Zabalkansky; 13 May [O.S. 2 May] 1785 – 10 June 1831) was a Prussian-born soldier serving as a Russian field marshal. His dynasty is of Silesian origin. He stands among the most important military leaders of the late modern period.

== Career ==
Hans Karl was born on 13 May [O.S. 2 May] 1785 in Groß Leipe. He was educated at the Berlin cadet school, but by the desire of his father, Frederick II's aide-de-camp who had passed into the service of Russia, he also did the same in 1801. He served in the campaign of 1805 against Napoleon and the Grande Armée, was wounded at Austerlitz, fought at Eylau and Friedland, and after Friedland was promoted captain.

During the next five years of peace, he devoted himself to the study of military science, engaging once more in active service in the War of 1812. He distinguished himself very greatly in Wittgenstein's campaign, and in particular at Polotsk (18 and 19 October), after which combat, he was raised to the rank of major-general. In the latter part of the campaign, he served against the Prussian contingent of General Yorck (von Wartenburg), with whom, through Clausewitz, he negotiated the celebrated convention of Tauroggen, serving thereafter with Yorck in the early part of the German Campaign of 1813.

After the battle of Lützen (1813), he served in Silesia and took part in negotiating the secret treaty of Reichenbach. Having distinguished himself at the battles of Dresden and Leipzig he was promoted lieutenant-general. At the crisis of the campaign of 1814, he strongly urged the march of the allies on Paris; and after their entry the emperor Alexander conferred on him the order of St. Alexander Nevsky.

In 1815 he attended the Congress of Vienna and was afterwards made adjutant-general to the emperor, with whom, as also with his successor Nicholas, he had great influence. By Nicholas he was created baron, and later count. In 1820 he had become chief of the general staff, and in 1825 he assisted in suppressing the Decembrist revolt.

His greatest exploits were in the Russo-Turkish War of 1828–1829, which, after a period of doubtful contest, was decided by Diebitsch's brilliant campaign of Adrianople; this won him the rank of field-marshal and the victory title of Zabalkansky (meaning "Trans-Balkan"; German: Sabalkanski) to commemorate his crossing of the Balkans.

In 1830 he was appointed to command the great army destined to suppress the November Uprising in Poland. After the inconclusive battle of Grochow on 25 February, he won the battle of Ostrołęka on 26 May, but soon afterwards died of cholera at Kleszewo near Pułtusk, on 10 June 1831.

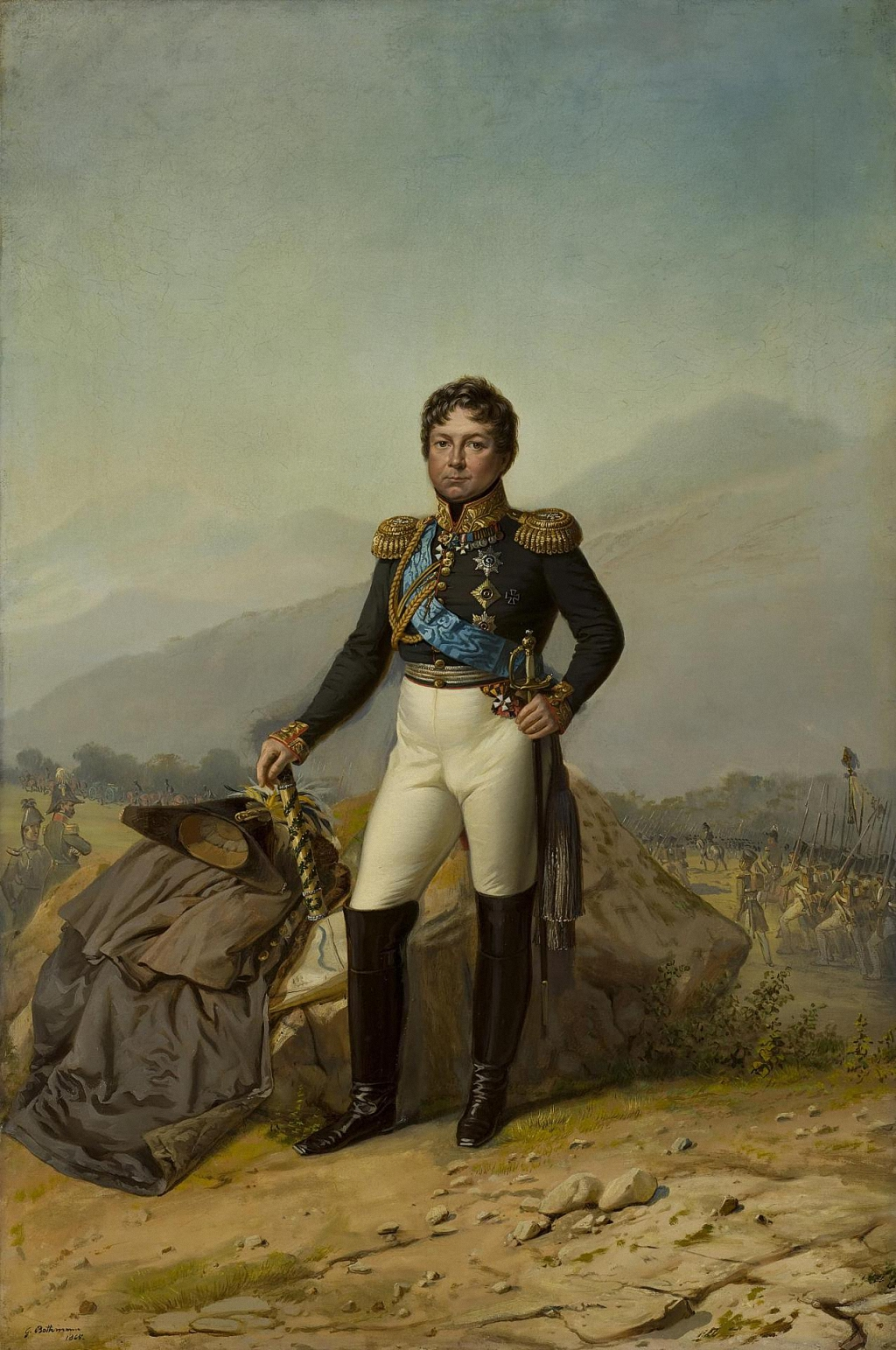
Diebitsch by Egor Botman

== Sources ==
- "Дибич-Забалканский, Иван Иванович" . Brockhaus and Efron Encyclopedic Dictionary (in Russian). 1906.
