= Loewen =

Loewen is a spelling variant of the word Löwen which means "lions" in German. This spelling is uncommon in Germany, Austria, and Switzerland (as in the most common German language dialects ö is used usually instead of oe, while in English ö and oe are the same thing) and a surname with this spelling is usually used by Mennonites or by Americans who Americanized their Löwen to Loewen. Notable people with the name include:

- Abe Loewen, Canadian drag racer
- Adam Loewen (born 1984), Canadian-American baseball player
- Bill Loewen (born 1930), Canadian entrepreneur, philanthropist, political activist and politician
- Chuck Loewen (born 1957), American football player
- Cynthia Loewen (born 1993), Canadian beauty queen
- Darcy Loewen (born 1969), Canadian-American hockey player
- Gregory Loewen (born 1966), Canadian social philosopher
- James W. Loewen (1942–2021), American sociologist
- Jocelyne Loewen (born 1976), Canadian voice actress
- John Loewen (born 1949), Canadian politician in Manitoba
- Raymond Loewen (born 1940), Canadian politician and business owner in British Columbia
- Rochelle Loewen (born 1979), Canadian broadcaster, glamour model and professional wrestler
- Royden Loewen (born 1954), Canadian historian
- Todd Loewen (born 1966), Canadian politician in Alberta

== See also ==
- Löwen (disambiguation)
