= Kleszewo =

Village in Masovian Voivodeship, Poland

- Village
- Location within Poland
- Coordinates: 52°45′N 21°6′E
- Country: Poland
- Voivodeship: Masovian
- County: Pułtusk
- Gmina: Pułtusk

Kleszewo [klɛˈʂɛvɔ] is a village in the administrative district of Gmina Pułtusk, within Pułtusk County, Masovian Voivodeship, in east-central Poland.
