= Gerhard Johann von Löwenwolde =

Baltic German noble

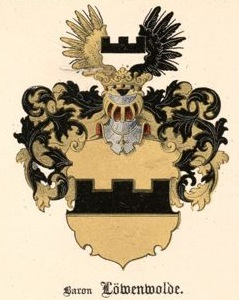
- Löwenwolde family CoA
- Born: Swedish Estonia
- Died: 1721; Russian Empire
- Occupations: knight and diplomat in Swedish, Saxon and Russian service Russian plenipotentiary in Livonia (1710-1713) hofmeister of Princess Charlotte of Brunswick-Wolfenbüttel (1713-1721)

Gerhard Johann von Löwenwolde (Гергард Иоганн Левенвольде, died 1721) was a Baltic German Estonian knight. In the 1690s, he announced support of Johann Reinhold von Patkul's lobbyism against Swedish absolutist threats to Baltic noble privileges, while also working with the Swedish authorities in Estonia. He served in the Swedish army, and in 1697 was promoted major of the Swedish garrison in Riga. During the Great Northern War, he first served Augustus the Strong of Saxe-Poland–Lithuania, and after taking an ambiguous stance towards August and Peter the Great of Russia entered Peter's service after the Capitulation of Estonia and Livonia in 1710. He served as Peter the Great's plenipotentiary of Livonia during the same year, and held that office until 1713, when he became hofmeister in the service of Princess Charlotte of Brunswick-Wolfenbüttel, wife of Peter's son Alexei Petrovich, Tsarevich of Russia.

With Magdalene Elisabeth von Löwen he had the following children:

- Charlotte
- Karl Gustav von Löwenwolde
- Gustav Reinhold von Löwenwolde
- Friedrich Casimir von Löwenwolde

== Sources ==
=== Bibliography ===
- Bushkovitch, Paul (2001). Peter the Great. The struggle for power, 1671-1725. New studies in European history. Cambridge University Press. ISBN 0-521-80585-6.
- Kappeler, Andreas (2008). Rußland als Vielvölkerreich. Entstehung, Geschichte, Zerfall. Beck'sche Reihe (in German). Vol. 1447 (2 ed.). Munich: C.H.Beck. ISBN 978-3-406-57739-0.
- Estland. Genealogisches Handbuch der baltischen Ritterschaften (in German). Vol. 2, 1.2. Görlitz: Verbände des livländischen, estländischen und kurländischen Stammadels. 1930.
