= Karl Gustav von Löwenwolde =

Russian diplomat and military commander

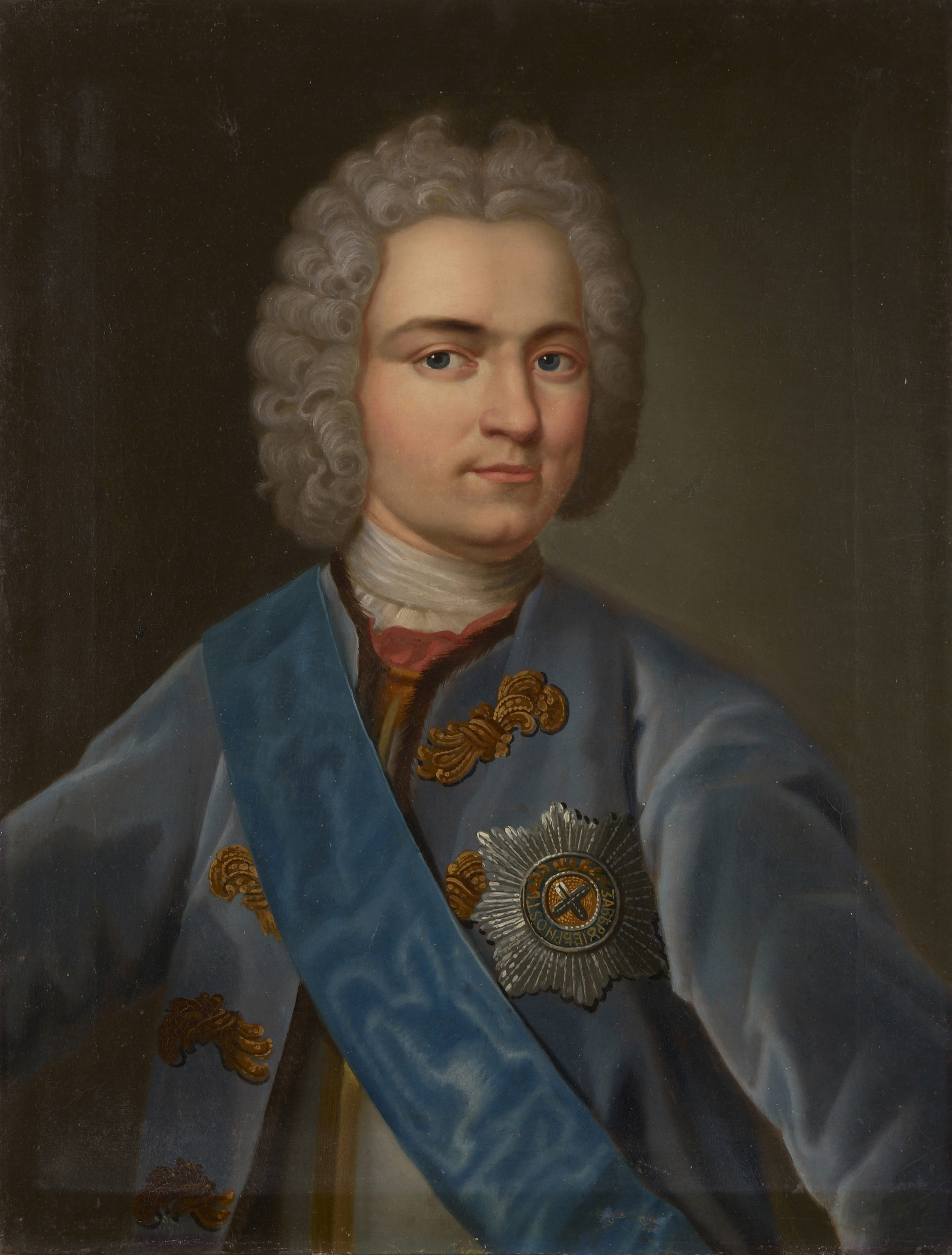

Count Karl Gustav von Löwenwolde (17th century – 30 April 1735 Räpina) (Polish: Karl Gustaw von Loewenwolde, Russian: Левенвольде, Карл Густав, Latvian: Kārlis Gustavs Lēvenvolde) was a Russian diplomat and military commander of German extraction.

He was a native of German speaking population of Livonia; and son of Gerhard Johann von Löwenwolde and Magdalene Elisabeth von Löwen and brother to knight of the Order of St. Andrew and Order of the Black Eagle Gustav Reinhold von Löwenwolde and Reichsgraf Friedrich Casimir von Löwenwolde.

He started his career at the court of Peter I of Russia and became one of the most important people at the court of Anna of Russia. He received the rank of general major in 1730 and become the first chief of the Izmaylovsky Regiment. Minister plenipotentiary to Austrian and Prussian courts in 1731; instrumental in the negotiations of the Löwenwolde's Treaty, which broke the possibility of Prussian-French alliance. Minister plenipotentiary in Poland (1733–1734). His last important mission was the negotiations between Russia and Austria in 1734 about an alliance against the Ottoman Empire.
