= Russo-Turkish War (1828–1829) =

Ninth conflict of the Russo-Turkish wars

- Part of Russo-Turkish wars, Russian conquest of the Caucasus, and Greek War of Independence
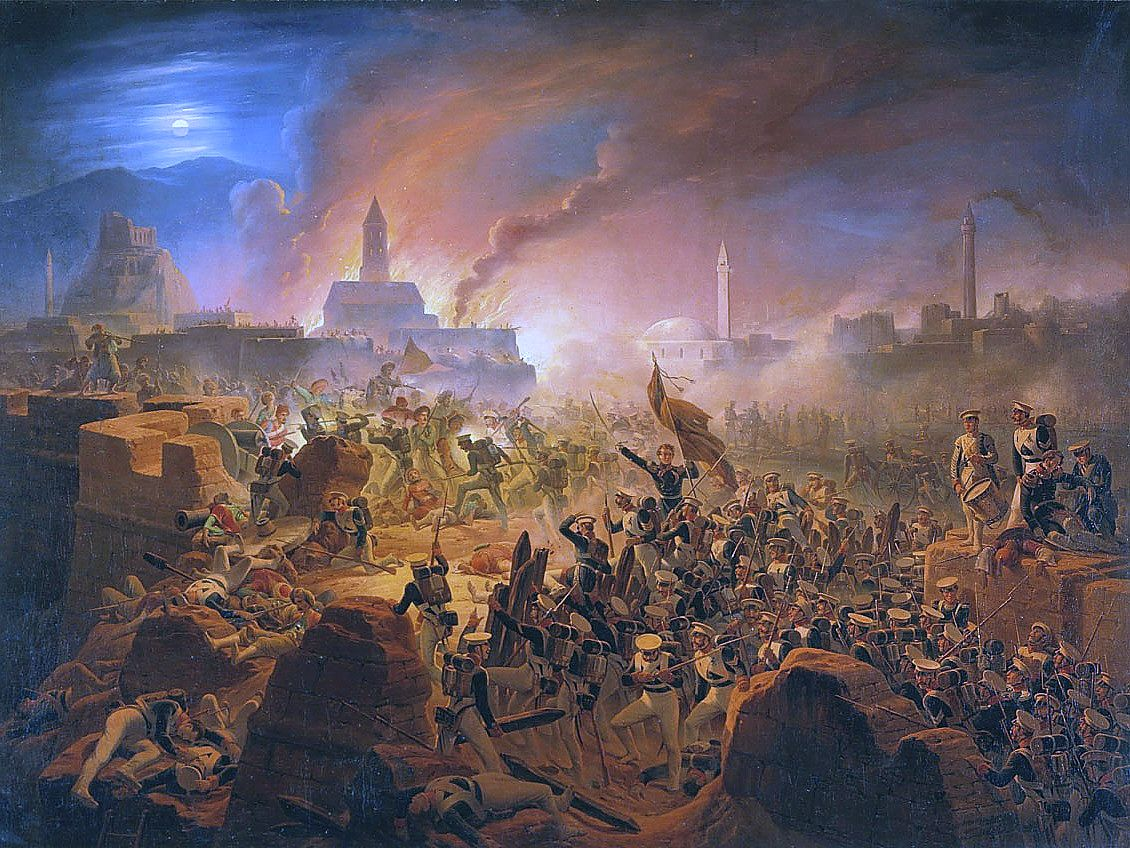
- Battle of Akhaltsikhe (1828), by January Suchodolski. Oil on canvas, 1839
Date	26 April 1828 – 14 September 1829 (1 year, 4 months, 2 weeks and 5 days)
Location	Balkans and the Caucasus
Result	Russian victory Treaty of Adrianople
Territorial changes	Danube Delta, Anapa, Sujuk-Qale (Novorossiysk), Poti, Akhaltsikhe and Akhalkalaki ceded to Russia

Belligerents
Russian Empire; Greece	Ottoman Empire; Circassia

Commanders and leaders
(Russian Empire) Nicholas I; (Russian Empire) Peter Wittgenstein; (Russian Empire) Ivan Paskevich; (Russian Empire) Hans Karl von Diebitsch; (Russian Empire) Ivan Burtsov; (Russian Empire) Grigory Zass; (Russian Empire) Aleksey Greig; (First Hellenic Republic) Ioannis Kapodistrias; (Kurdistan Region) Jafar Agha	(Ottoman Empire) Mahmud II; (Ottoman Empire) Reşid Mehmed Pasha; (Ottoman Empire) Agha Husein Pasha; (Circassia) Ismail Berzeg; (Circassia) Jembulat Boletoqo; (Circassia) Seferbiy Zaneqo

Units involved
(Russian Empire) Imperial Russian Army (Kurdistan Region) Kurdish regiments (Armenia) Ottoman Armenian volunteers	(Ottoman Empire) Ottoman Army

Strength
100,000	180,000

Casualties and losses
42,515 dead	80,000 dead

The Russo-Turkish War of 1828–1829 resulted from the Greek War of Independence of 1821–1829; war broke out after the Ottoman Sultan Mahmud II closed the Dardanelles to Russian ships and in November 1827 revoked the 1826 Akkerman Convention in retaliation for the participation of the Imperial Russian Navy in the Battle of Navarino of October 1827.

The Ottoman Empire had bloodily abolished its centuries-old regular army, the Janissary Corps, in 1826. A year later, Great Britain, France, and Russia jointly raided the Ottoman Navy at Navarino. When war broke out between the Ottomans and Russia in 1828, the Ottomans possessed neither a regular army nor a navy. After suffering several defeats, both in the Balkans and in the Caucasus, the Sultan decided to sue for peace, which resulted in the signing of the Treaty of Adrianople on 14 September 1829.

== The Balkan front ==
At the start of hostilities, the Russian army of 100,000 men was commanded by Emperor Nicholas I, while the Ottoman forces were commanded by Agha Hüseyin Pasha appointed by Sultan Mahmut II. In April and May 1828, the Russian commander-in-chief, Prince Peter Wittgenstein, moved into the Danubian Principalities. In June 1828, the main Russian forces under the emperor crossed the Danube and advanced into Dobruja.

The Russians then laid prolonged sieges to three key Ottoman citadels in modern Bulgaria: Shumen, Varna, and Silistra. With the support of the Black Sea Fleet under Aleksey Greig, Varna was captured on 29 September. The Siege of Shumen proved much more problematic, as the 40,000-strong Ottoman garrison outnumbered the Russian forces. As the Russians were harassed by Turkish troops and ill-equipped, many of the soldiers died of disease or exhaustion. Russia then had to withdraw to Moldavia with heavy losses without having captured Shumen and Silistra.

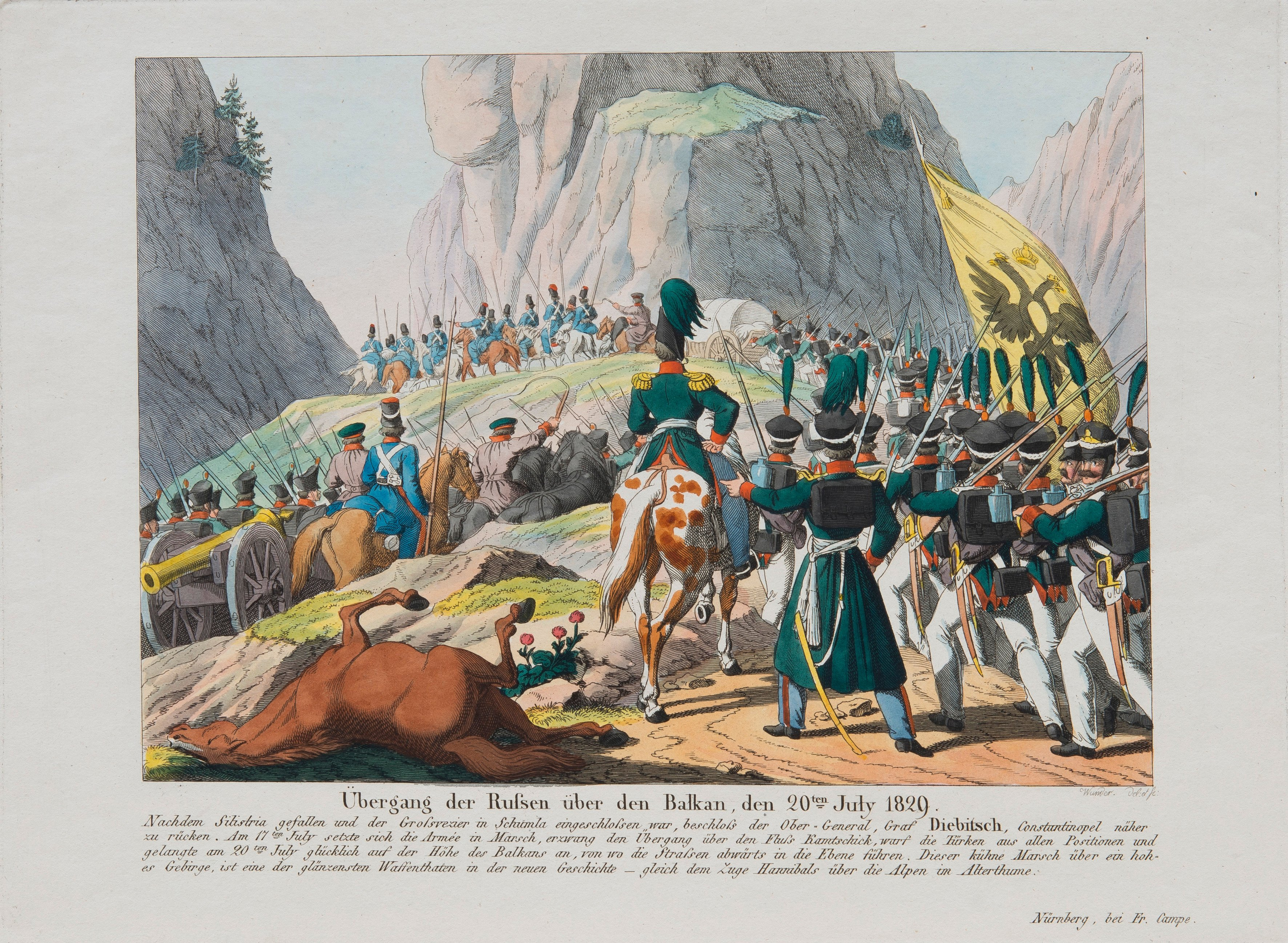
The passage of the Russian army through the Balkan mountains.

As winter approached, the Russian army was forced to leave Shumen and retreat back to Bessarabia. In February 1829, the cautious Wittgenstein was replaced by the more energetic Hans Karl von Diebitsch, and the Tsar left the army for Saint Petersburg. On 7 May, 60,000 soldiers led by Field Marshal Diebitsch crossed the Danube and resumed the siege of Silistra. The Sultan sent a 40,000-strong contingent to the relief of Varna, which was defeated at the Battle of Kulevicha on 30 May. Three weeks later on 19 June, Silistra fell to the Russians.

On 2 July, Diebitsch launched the Trans-Balkan offensive, the first in Russian history since the 10th-century campaigns of Svyatoslav I. The contingent of 35,000 Russians moved across the mountains, circumventing the besieged Shumla on their way to Constantinople. The Russians captured Burgas ten days later, and the Turkish reinforcement was routed near Sliven on 31 July. By 22 August, the Russians had taken Adrianople, reportedly causing the Muslim population in the city to leave. Edirne Palace was heavily damaged by Russian troops.

== The Caucasus front ==
Although the main fighting was in the west, there was significant action on the Caucasus front. Ivan Paskevich's main aims were to tie down as many Turkish troops as possible; to capture the Turkish forts on the Black Sea coast that supported the Circassians and might be used to land troops; and to push the border west to some desirable point. Most of the Turkish partisans were led by the semi-independent Pasha of Akhaltsikhe and Muslim Georgian Beys who ruled the hills. Kars on an upland plain blocked the road from Akhaltsikhe to Erzurum, the main city in eastern Turkey. The Russo-Persian War (1826–28) had just ended, which removed a major danger. Since two-thirds of Paskevich's troops were tied down holding the Caucasus and watching the Persians, he had only 15,000 men to fight the Turks. The Turks delayed attacking so Paskevich had time to move troops and supplies west, concentrating at Gyumri on the border.

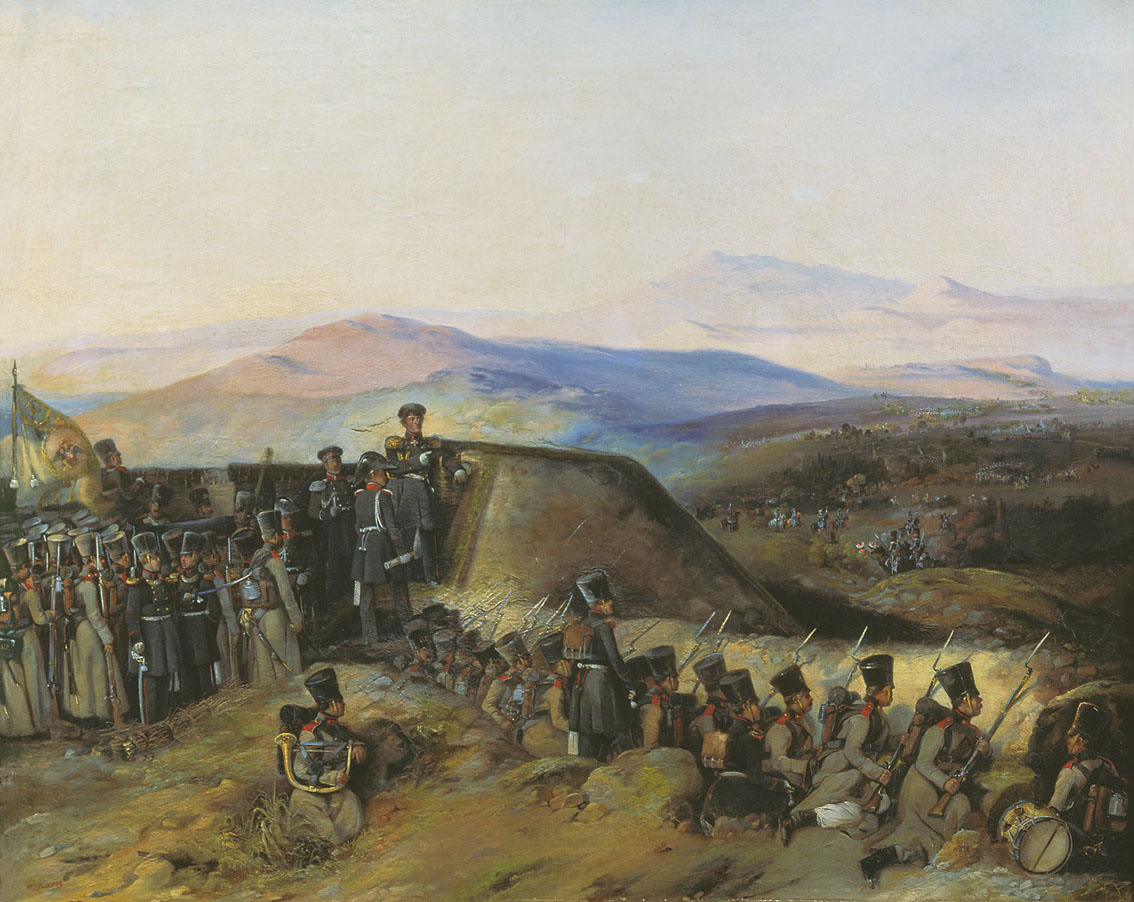
An episode of the battle of this war

1828, June: Kars: On 14 June, Paskevich set out for Kars 40 miles southwest which was held by 11,000 Turks with 151 guns. (Note: All dates are Julian. Add 12 days for the modern Gregorian calendar.) The capture of Kars was almost an accident. During a skirmish in the outskirts of the city a company of riflemen under Lieutenant Labintsev made an unauthorized advance. Seeing their danger, other companies rushed to the rescue. Their situation drew in more soldiers until most of the Russian force was massed at one point. The city wall was breached and soon the Turks held only the citadel. At 10:00 am on 23 June the citadel surrendered. The Turks lost 2,000 killed and wounded, 1,350 prisoners and 151 guns, although much of the garrison managed to escape. The Russians lost 400 killed and wounded. Kios Pasha (Note: Allen-Muratoff call him Köse Mehmet. Köse means beardless so he may have been a eunuch.) of Erzurum was within an hour's march of Kars, but when he heard the news, he withdrew to Ardahan.

1828, July: Akhalkalaki: Paskevich then feinted toward Erzurum but marched north to Akhalkalaki where he attacked the city first with his artillery. Under bombardment, the 1,000-man Turkish garrison became demoralized and half of the men tried to escape by letting themselves down the walls on ropes. Most of the Turks, however, were killed. The Russians then used the same ropes to scale the walls and enter the city. The Turks remaining in the garrison, some 300 men, surrendered on 24 July.

1828, August: Akhaltsikhe: Thirty miles to the northwest of Akhalkalaki was Akhaltsikhe with 10,000 men under a semi-independent Pasha. It guarded the Borjomi Gorge which led northeast to Georgia. Instead of taking the main road which went southwest to Ardahan and then north, Paskevich and 8,000 men marched three days through road less country and reached Akhaltsikhe on 3 August. The next day Kios Pasha and 30,000 men encamped four miles from the fort. Paskevich, outnumbered by an enemy on two sides, turned on Kios. After a day-long battle, Kios and his infantry force of 5,000 men fled to the Akhaltsikhe fortress while the remaining Turks scattered south to Ardahan. During the battle with Kios Pasha, the Russians lost 531 men, including a general, but confiscated a great amount of the Turk's supplies. Paskevich and his troops now began a siege of Akhaltsikhe which had three layers of defense: the town with its crooked streets, ravines and bastions; the fortress; and a citadel.

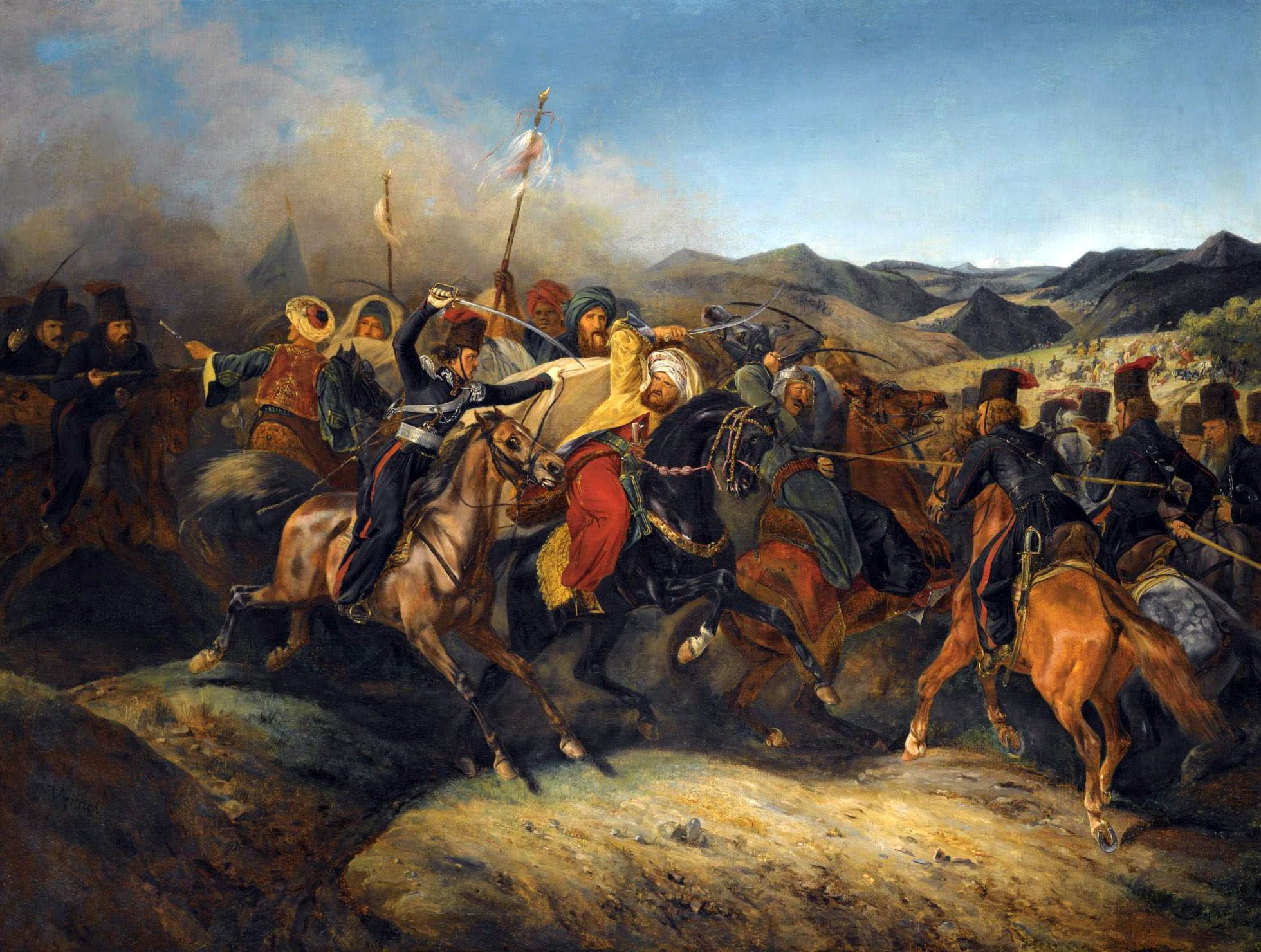
Clash between Turks and Russians

When the attack began at 4:00 pm, the citizens defended themselves as best they could but by nightfall the town was on fire. In one mosque 400 people burned to death. By dawn of the 16th the ruined town was in Russian hands. The Russians then moved their artillery up to bear on the fortress walls. On 17 August, Kios Pasha surrendered the fortress and the citadel on the condition that he and his remaining 4,000 men be allowed to withdraw with their arms and property. During the battle, the Russians lost about 600 men while the Turks lost 6,000.

The next day, Paskevich attacked and captured Atskhur castle which guarded the Borjomi Gorge leading from Akhaltsikhe northeast to Georgia. On 22 August the Russians occupied Ardahan, the road junction connecting Akhaltsikhe-Akhalkalaki to the Kars-Erzurum road. Seeing no further opportunities the Russians retired to winter quarters.

Russo-Turkish War 1828–29
X=Russian = taken and kept;
Blue circle=Taken and returned; Blue triangle=Turkish not captured

1829: Kios Pasha was replaced by Salih Pasha with Haghki (Hakki) Pasha as his deputy. Over the winter Paskevich went to St Petersburg with a plan for a massive invasion of Anatolia, but his plan was rejected. Twenty thousand (20,000) raw recruits were to be sent to the Caucasus, but they would not be ready until late summer. On 30 January the Russian ambassadors to Tehran, including Alexander Griboyedov were killed by a mob. Both sides were hesitant to restart the fighting, but the possibility tied up part of the Russian army. On 21 February Akhmet Beg (Ahmet Bey) of Hulo and 15,000 Lazes and Adjars occupied the town of Akhaltsikhe and besieged the fortress. Twelve days later Russian Commander Burtsov forced the Borjomi Gorge and the Adjars fled with their loot. General Hesse drove back a Turkish advance from Batum and captured the Turkish camp of Limani south of Poti. Far to the southeast, Bayazid was besieged by the Pasha of Van. The main Turkish advance began in mid-May. Kiaghi Bek approached Ardahan, but was driven north to Adjaria where he threatened Akhaltsikhe. He was defeated at Digur south of Akhaltsikhe and the Russians went south to join Paskevich at Kars.

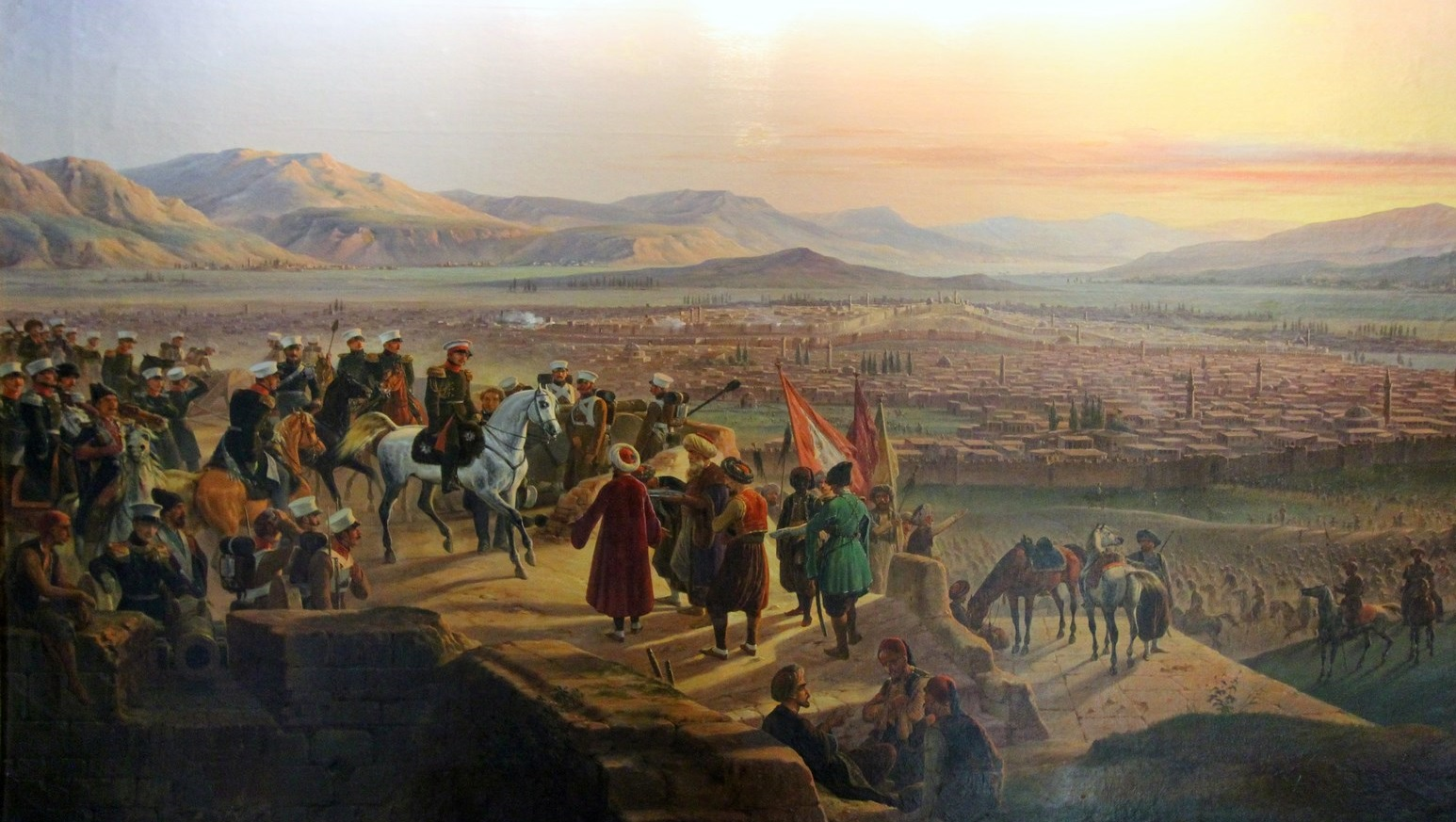
Capitulation of Erzurum (1829), by January Suchodolski.

1829, June: Saganlug and Erzurum: On 13 June Paskevich (12,340 infantry, 5,785 cavalry and 70 guns) left Kars for Erzurum. The Turks had 50,000 men including 30,000 nizams (new-model infantry). They stood between Hasankale and Zivin on the Erzurum-Kars road. Further east on the road an advanced force (20,000 under Haghki Pasha) held the Millidiuz (Meliduz) Pass over the Saganlug mountain. (Note: Allen-Muratoff have Soğanli-dağ (former) and Pasinler-sira-dağ (current)) Paskevich chose to take the inferior road to the north, place himself near Zevin between the two armies and attack Haghki Pasha from the rear. There were complex maneuvers and small actions. At 7:00 pm on the 19th Paskevich attacked and completely defeated the western army. Next day he turned east and captured Haghki Pasha and 19 guns, but most of his men managed to scatter. With the armies out of the way he set out for Erzurum. On 27 June, the city, which had not seen Christian soldiers within its walls for five centuries, surrendered.

1829: After Erzurum: From Erzurum the main road led northwest through Bayburt and Hart to Trebizond on the coast, a very formidable place that could only be taken with the fleet which was now busy on the Bulgarian coast. In July Russian Commander Burtsov went up this road and was killed at Hart. To retrieve Russia's reputation Paskevich destroyed Hart on 28 July. He sent an army west and brought it back, went up the Trebizond road, saw that nothing could be accomplished in that direction, and returned to Erzurum. Hesse and Osten-Sacken pushed north toward Batum and returned. The Pasha of Trebizond moved against Bayburt and was defeated on 28 September, the last action of the war. The Treaty of Adrianople (1829) was signed on 2 September 1829, but it took a month for the news to reach Paskevich. In October his army began marching home. Russia kept the ports of Anapa and Poti, the border forts of Atskhur, Akhalkalaki and Akhaltsikhe, but returned Ardahan and the Pashaliks of Kars, Bayazid and most of Akhaltsikhe Pashalik. In 1855 and 1877 Paskevich's work had to be done all over again. One consequence of the war was the migration of 90,000 Armenians from Turkish to Russian territory.

== Kurdish-Armenian involvement ==
Following the return of Erzurum, Kars and Bayazid the war had struck an entirely new note of danger. Not only had Ottoman Armenians assisted the Russian capture of Kars, but Muslim Kurdish tribes had also provided a regiment against Sultan Mahmud. Yazidi Kurds also took part in the campaign against the Turks, Russian poet Alexander Pushkin described his encounterment with a detachment in the Russian army. Two tribe chiefs, Jafar Agha and Ahmet Agha, commanded these Kurdish regiments, under the supervision of Captain Loris Melikov. They also participated in the Crimean war with the same Kurdish regiments.

== Treaty of Adrianople ==
Territorial changes after the Treaty of Adrianople

Faced with these several defeats, the Sultan decided to sue for peace. The Treaty of Adrianople signed on 14 September 1829 gave Russia most of the eastern shore of the Black Sea and the mouth of the Danube. Turkey recognized Russian sovereignty over parts of present-day northwest Armenia. Serbia achieved autonomy and Russia was allowed to occupy Moldavia and Wallachia (guaranteeing their prosperity and full "liberty of trade") until Turkey had paid a large indemnity. Moldavia and Wallachia remained Russian protectorates until the Crimean War. The Straits Question was settled four years later, when both powers signed the Treaty of Hünkâr İskelesi.

Regarding the Greek situation with the treaty of Adrianople, the Ottoman Sultan finally recognized the independence of the Kingdom of Greece. Much later, Karl Marx in an article in the New York Tribune (21 April 1853), wrote: "Who solved finally the Greek case? It was neither the rebellion of Ali Pasha, neither the battle in Navarino, neither the French Army in Peloponnese, neither the conferences and protocols of London; but it was Diebitsch, who invaded through the Balkans to Evros".

== See also ==
- Russo-Persian War (1826–28)
- Greek War of Independence

== General references ==
- Egorshina, O.; Petrova, A. (2023). "русско-турецкая война 1828-1829" [Russo-Turkish War of 1828-1829]. История русской армии [The history of the Russian Army] (in Russian). Moscow: Edition of the Russian Imperial Library. ISBN 978-5-699-42397-2.
- Allen, William Edward David; Muratoff, Paul (2010). "II". Caucasian Battlefields.
- Bitis, Alexander. "The 1828–1829 Russo-Turkish war and the resettlement of Balkan peoples into Novorossiia." Jahrbücher Für Geschichte Osteuropas (2005): 506-525 online in English
- Marriott, J. A. R. The Eastern Question An Historical Study in European Diplomacy (1940) pp 221–225. online
- The Ottoman Empire: Problems of Foreign Policy and Relations with Russia (in Russian). 1996.
- Sheremet, V. I. (2002). "At the gates of Constantinople. Campaign of 1829 and the Treaty of Adrianople. The Russo-Turkish War of 1828–1829: Military Actions and Geopolitical Consequences". Military History Magazine (in Russian) (2).
- Shishov, A. V. (2001). Russian General-Field Marshals Dibich-Zabalkansky, Paskevich-Erivansky (in Russian).
