= Aleksander Franciszek Chodkiewicz =

Polish writer and chemist

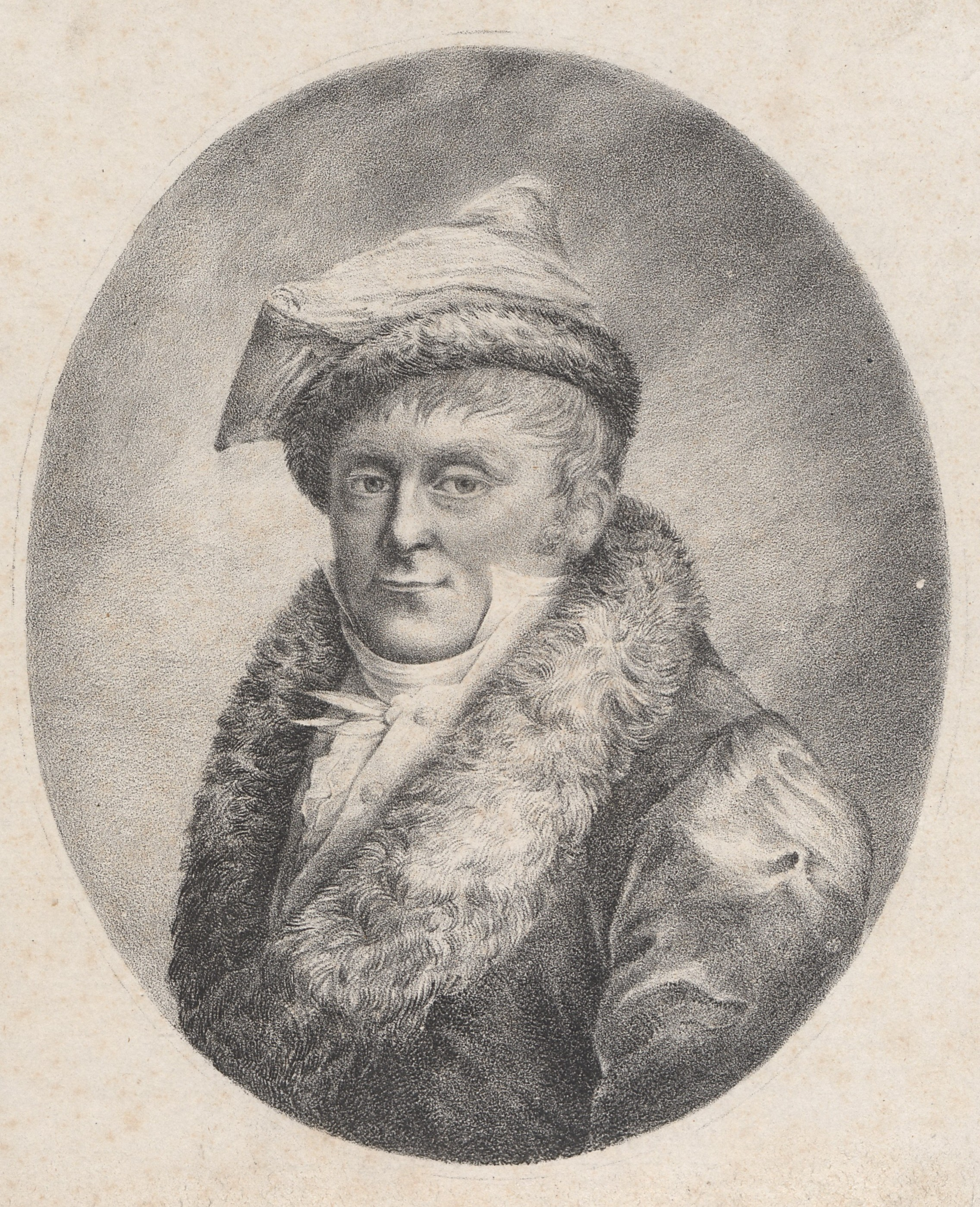
Aleksander Chodkiewicz (artist unknown, 1822)

Count Aleksander Franciszek Chodkiewicz (Lithuanian: Aleksandras Pranciškus Chodkevičius; 4 June 1776, Chernobyl - 24 January 1838, Młynów) was a Polish writer, playwright, chemist, lithographer, patron of the arts, collector, military officer and politician.

== Biography ==
He was the son of Count Jan Mikołaj Chodkiewicz, the Starost of Duchy of Samogitia, and his wife, Maria Ludwika Rzewuska (1744–1816), daughter of the poet and Hetman, Wacław Rzewuski. He originally studied at home and then, after 1790, attended a private boarding school for the nobility. He took part in the Kościuszko Uprising, becoming a Major in the National Guard. When the uprising failed, he settled in Volhynia, devoting himself to scientific and literary work, as his estates had been sequestered.

He was a member of the Sejm in 1809. During the Austro-Polish War, he organized secret patriotic activities. When Napoleon's armies took Vilnius, he became a member of the Armed Forces Committee of the Lithuanian Provisional Governing Commission. Appointed a Colonel, he created his own regiment and became an Adjutant to General Józef Antoni Kossakowski. In 1812, he was sent to Warsaw, then spent eleven months in the besieged Modlin Fortress. After its surrender by General Herman Willem Daendels, Chodkiewicz refused to cooperate, and was taken prisoner by the Russians for a brief period.

In 1818, at his own request, he was dismissed from service with the rank of Brigadier-General. The following year, he was appointed to the Senate of the Kingdom of Poland; a satellite state of the Russian Empire. His service was cut short by decree, after only six months, when he felt insulted by Grand Duke Konstantin Pavlovich and strongly opposed his policies on the Senate floor. From 1820 to 1825, he served as a Deputy in the Sejm, representing the area around Sandomierz.

In 1826, by order of Grand Duke Konstantin, he was arrested, taken to St. Petersburg, and imprisoned on charges of belonging to secret societies. He was known to be a member of some patriotic organizations, but no criminal activity could be proven, and he was released. Nevertheless, he was held under what amounted to house arrest in Żytomierz for a year; having to report to the police periodically. After the failure of the November Uprising, he returned to Młynow and remained there until his death. During his final years, he established several schools and an Orthodox Church. He also helped to support the naturalist, Antoni Andrzejowski and the artist, Józef Oleszkiewicz, among others.

He was married twice. First, to Teresa Karolina Walewska (1778–1846), with whom he had two daughters and two sons. She had an affair with General Aleksandr Golitsyn, and divorced Chodkiewicz to marry him. His second wife was Franciszka Ksawera Szczeniowska (1806–1855), with whom he had one son.

== Scientific and cultural activities ==
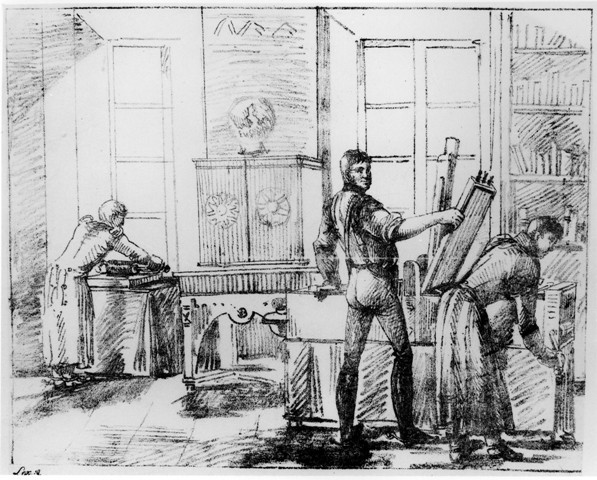
Chodkiewicz's lithography studio; by Józef Lex

In 1811, he set up a chemical laboratory in his palace. From 1816 to 1820, he published a seven-volume textbook on chemistry. He devised much of the terminology himself, which brought him into a long, and often politely contentious, correspondence with Jędrzej Śniadecki, who was engaged in the same endeavor. In 1814, he gave a lecture on obtaining iodine from fucus and, in 1816, devised a simplified method of obtaining potassium from potash. Later, he argued against designating chlorine as a new element, and experimented with the Zamboni pile; an early battery.

In 1818, together with the educator, Jan Siestrzyński, he introduced the relatively new art of lithography to Poland. His first published lithographs were after drawings by Jan Paweł Lelewel. He combined this with his interest in chemistry, attempting to improve the ink and paper used in the process. In 1820, he published Portraits of famous Poles, drawn on stone by Walenty Śliwicki, with a description of their lives, in which he provided the biographies. Numerous issues of the Gazeta Warszawska were printed in his studio.

He also wrote and translated novels, poems and plays; notably the five-act tragedy, The Spaniards in Peru or the death of Roila (1797), by August von Kotzebue. His own tragedies included Classical subjects, such as Cato in Utyce (1809), and Polish history, in Jadwiga, the Polish Queen (1817). He also wrote a memoir, The History of the Great Events of My Life, Written by Me with My Own Hand, along with Some Annexes That May Be Used in Polish History from 1777 to December 28, 1819, which was not published until 2010.

In addition to his creative activities, he collected books, paintings, coins, minerals and sculptures. He maintained an archive; originally in Pekałów, then Warsaw and, finally, at his palace in Młynow. His book collecting began in 1801, and by 1810 he had over 10,000 volumes. In 1816, he inherited more books from his mother. By 1823, he had 25,000 volumes. Three years later, most of the library was auctioned off and dispersed. At the time of his death, he still owned about 3,600 volumes. His heirs began enlarging the collection again. It eventually comprised over 30,000 volumes, but many were destroyed by the Bolsheviks between 1917 and 1919. The surviving ones were transferred to the National Museum of Kraków, from 1920 to 1936, in several lots. Since 1951, his books, original manuscripts, and personal papers have been divided between the National Archives and the Czartoryski Library.

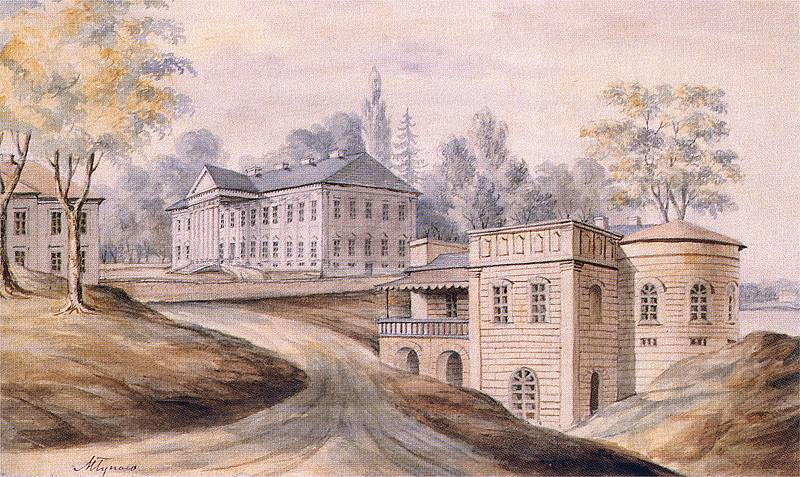
The Chodkiewicz Palace in Młynów, by Napoleon Orda
