= Sejm of Congress Poland =

Parliament in the 19th century Kingdom of Poland

Sejm of Congress Poland Sejm Królestwa Polskiego
- Kingdom of Poland

Type
- Type: Bicameral
- Chambers: Senate; Chamber of Deputies
- Term limits: 2 years

History
- Founded: 1815
- Disbanded: 1831
- Preceded by: Sejm of the Duchy of Warsaw
- Succeeded by: Legislative Sejm

Leadership
- King of Poland: Nicholas I since 1825
- President of the Senate: Stanisław Kostka Zamoyski since 1822
- Marshal of the Sejm: Władysław Ostrowski since 1830
- Seats: 192; 64 Senators; 128 Deputies

Elections
- Senate voting system: Appointment
- Chamber of Deputies voting system: First past the post with limited suffrage

Meeting place
- Royal Castle, Warsaw

The Sejm of Congress Poland (Polish: Sejm Królestwa Polskiego, Russian: Сейм Ца́рства По́льского) was the parliament in the 19th century Kingdom of Poland, colloquially known as Congress Poland. It existed from 1815 to 1831. In the history of the Polish parliament, it succeeded the Sejm of the Duchy of Warsaw.

== History ==
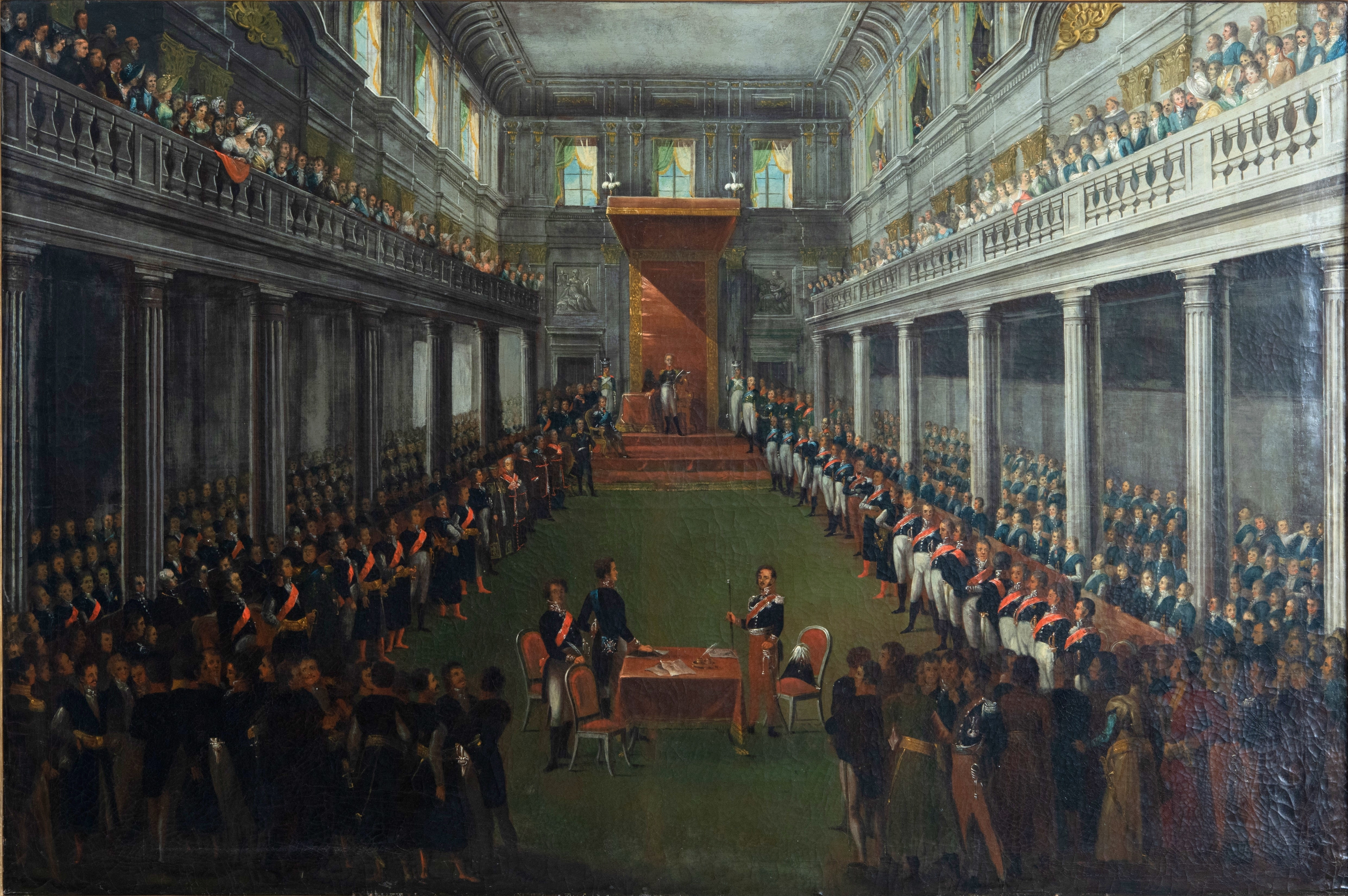
Sejm of Congress Poland in 1818

After the Congress of Vienna, a small Kingdom of Poland, known as Congress Poland, was recreated, with its king being the Tsar of Russia, Alexander I. Alexander I, an enlightened autocrat, decided to use Congress Poland as an experiment to see if Russian autocratic rule could be mixed with an elective legislative system, and rule Poland as a constitutional monarchy. At that time many hoped that this experiment would be a success and pave way to a liberalization in Russia; in the end it proved to be a failure.

Tsar Alexander left the administration to his younger brother, Grand Duke Constantine Pavlovich of Russia, to serve as viceroy. Constantine, with the help of Nikolay Nikolayevich Novosiltsev, "Russified" Congress Poland and oversaw secret police investigations of student groups in contravention of the Constitution. Alexander visited the Sejm in 1820 and received such condemnation from the deputies (members of the Sejm's lower house) that he reversed his stance of the Sejm as a liberalization experiment although he was still bound by the Congress of Vienna not to liquidate Russia's partition of Poland entirely. By 1825, Alexander I was sufficiently dissatisfied with the Sejm that he decided to bar some of the most vocal opposition deputies from it.

Although the Sejm was supposed to meet every 2 years, only four sessions were called by the Tsar as it became the scene of increased clashes between liberal deputies and conservative government officials. With regards to the years the Sejm met, Bardach gives the dates of 1818, 1820, 1823 and 1830; Jędruch offers a similar list, however lists 1825 instead of 1823.

Nicholas, an opponent of Alexander's liberalization efforts, acceded the throne as Tsar Nicholas I upon Alexander's death in December 1825. Idealistic Russian military officers resisted Nicholas's takeover in the Decembrist revolt. Some Polish liberals were accused of being connected to the Decembrist plot and were brought before the Sejm for trial in 1828. Despite heavy political pressure from Moscow, the Sejm Tribunal only found them guilty of belonging to the National Patriotic Society formed by Walerian Łukasiński (a misdemeanor) rather than treason. The decision was met with cheers in Poland but infuriated Tsar Nicholas.

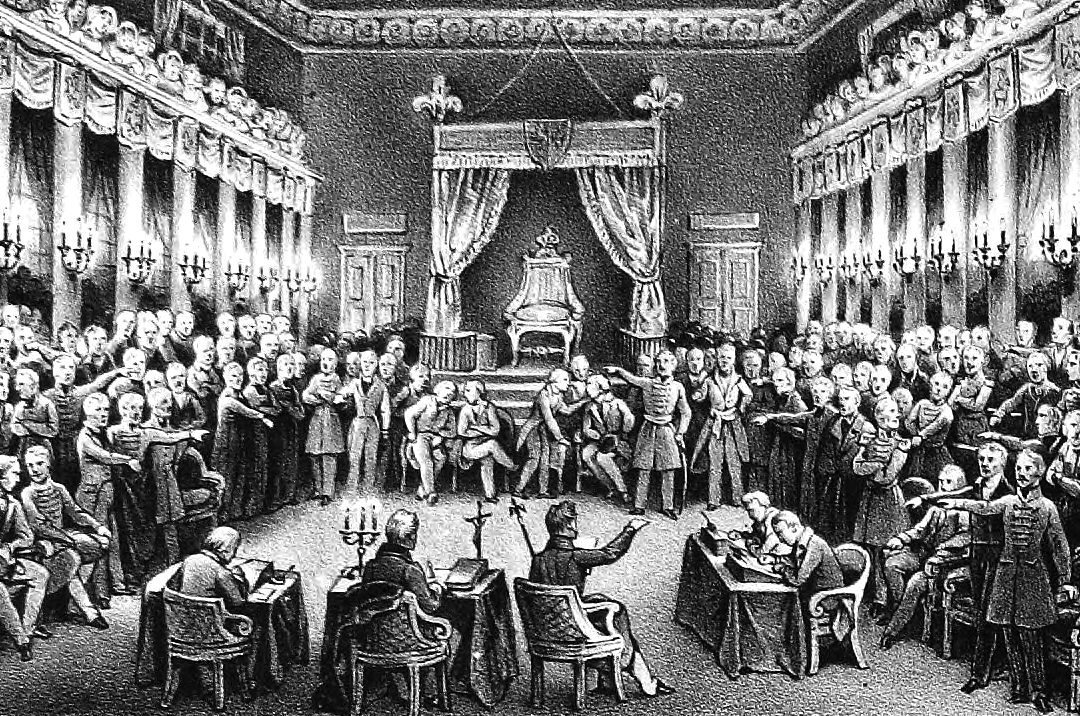
Dethronisation of Tsar Nicholas I by the Sejm in 1831

In the 1830 session, the Sejm refused to allocate funding for a statue in Warsaw to honor Tsar Alexander, further incensing Moscow. The Tsar's tightening grip on Poland ran counter to the growing romantic nationalism sweeping Poland's youth, especially in the universities. These factors led to increasing discontent within Poland culminating in the failed November Uprising in 1830. An extraordinary Sejm was convened on 18 December 1830. Despite the danger this failed attempt to assassinate the Grand Duke represented, the Sejm was swept by nationalist fervor and supported the insurgents, thereby appointing a new revolutionary government led by General Józef Chłopicki. On 25 January 1831, it passed an act introduced by Roman Sołtyk dethroning Tsar Nicholas I and declaring full independence from Russia. Senator Wincenty Krasiński, one of the few votes against the National Patriotic Society members, refused to join the revolt. The overthrow of Russian rule was planned badly and as the fortunes of war turned against the insurgents, the last session of the Sejm-in-exile was held in Płock in September that year. After the uprising was crushed, in an act of vengeance the Tsar not only eliminated the parliamentary institution of the Sejm from the new government of Congress Poland, but ordered the demolition of the Chamber of Deputies in the Castle of Warsaw. Member of the Sejm and noted historian Joachim Lelewel, as well as fellow deputy Julian Ursyn Niemcewicz and countless others, fled the Russian crackdown in what would be termed the "Great Emigration."

== Composition and duration ==
The Sejm was composed of the king, the upper house (Senate) and the lower house (Chamber of Deputies or Sejm proper). There were 128 members (called deputies), including 77 deputies elected by the nobility (szlachta) at local sejmiks, and 51 elected by the non-noble classes. They were chosen for 6 years, with one third of them chosen every 2 years. Sejms were called every 2 years for a period of 30 days, with provisions for extraordinary sessions in time of special need. The king could also dissolve the Sejm before the 30 days elapsed. During the Uprising, on 19 February 1831, a new law declared the Sejm in constant session. The Marshal of the Sejm was appointed by the king. Candidates for all offices had to meet specific wealth requirements.

Suffrage was offered to property owners, lease holders, and teachers. Jews were forbidden from voting. Military personnel had no right to vote. Overall, about 100,000 people in the Congress Poland population of 2.7 million had the right to vote, which made them one of the most enfranchised populations in early 19th-century Europe.

Candidates for Deputy had to be literate males over the age of 30. The deputies had legal immunity, although that did not prevent two liberal deputies, brothers Bonawentura and Wincenty Niemojowski, from being placed under temporary house arrest to prevent them from joining the Sejm in 1825.

The Senate had 64 members, including 9 bishops, 18 voivodes and 37 castellans. Candidates for the Senate members (senators) were appointed by the king for a lifetime from a list prepared by a Senate, and had to be at least 35 years old.

== Competences ==
While the Constitution of Congress Poland was relatively liberal in theory, and gave the Sejm significant powers (wider than those of the Sejm of the Duchy of Warsaw), in practice its powers were limited, as they were often not respected by the tsar. Jews and peasants lost rights they had previously enjoyed under the Duchy of Warsaw.

The Sejm had the right to vote on civil, administrative and legal issues; a simple majority was required to pass laws. With permission from the king, it could vote on matters related to the fiscal system and the military. It had the right to control government officials, and could prepare reviews and reports on them to present to the king. It had legislative competences in court and administrative law. It could issue laws on currency, taxation and budget, deal with issues related to military conscription (such as its size), and amend the constitution. It had no legislative initiative, as that belong only to the king; however, the Sejm could issue petitions to the monarch with proposed legislation.

The Senate, rather than the judiciary, acted as the tribunal, and could sit in judgement over government officials impeached by the Sejm. The Sejm Tribunal also had competences in cases of crimes against the state. After the Sejm Tribunal's 1828 acquittal of the National Patriotic Society members, Tsar Nicholas reversed the tribunal's verdict and permanently removed the Sejm's competency to hear other such cases.

== Bibliography ==
Jacek Jędruch (1998). Constitutions, elections, and legislatures of Poland, 1493–1977: a guide to their history. EJJ Books. ISBN 978-0-7818-0637-4.

Lewinski-Corwin, Edward H. (1917). The political history of Poland. New York: Polish Book Importing Co.
