= Józef Dwernicki =

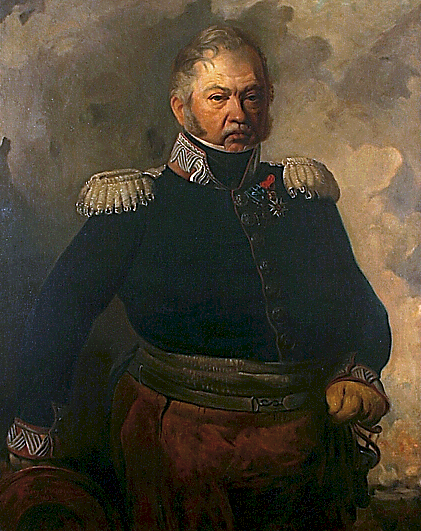
Józef Dwernicki; portrait by Aleksander Raczyński (1856)

Józef Dwernicki (19 March 1779 in Warsaw – 23 November 1857 in Lopatyn near Lwów) was a General of Cavalry in the Polish Army, and a participant in the November Uprising (1830–1831).

== Biography ==
Dwernicki was born in a noble family of Sas coat of arms, which owned villages in Podolia. His parents were Polish patriots, and at the age of 12, young Józef entered a military school, where he remained until 1795. He then returned to the family property at Zawale in Podolia, where he took care of the farm. In 1806, when during the War of the Fourth Coalition, French armies approached the Vistula river, Dwernicki, together with his friend Augustyn Trzecieski, decided to find the so-called Patriotic Society, which planned an anti-Russian uprising. The insurrection failed, due to the Treaties of Tilsit, signed in July 1807.

In 1809, Dwernicki armed 80 men, crossed the Zbruch river, and joined Polish troops under Piotr Strzyżewski (27 May 1809, near Tarnopol). He fought in the Polish–Austrian War: his bravery and efforts resulted in promotion to the rank of captain. In 1810, Duke Józef Poniatowski awarded him the Virtuti Militari, and nominated him commander of a squadron in the 15th Uhlan Regiment, formed in Podolia. Dwernicki, together with his uhlans, fought in the French invasion of Russia of 1812. In January 1813, he was promoted to the rank of major, and in March, he once again was awarded the Virtuti Militari. Soon afterwards, he received French Legion of Honour.

In the summer of 1813, after the disastrous invasion of Russia, Dwernicki became commandant of the 8th Uhlan Regiment, with which he fought in France and Germany. After the Battle of Wartenberg (3 October 1813), Napoleon Bonaparte personally awarded him Golden Cross of the Legion of Honour. Dwernicki also distinguished himself in the Battle of Leipzig. On 4 January 1814 he was promoted to the rank of Colonel, and became commandant of the Krakus Regiment, with which he fought in the suburbs of Paris.

=== After the Napoleonic Wars ===
Following the Napoleonic Wars, Dwernicki returned to Congress Poland, joining the Freemasons in 1816. He was named commandant of the 2nd Uhlan Regiment, which was stationed in Podlasie. His military skills were greatly appreciated by Russian Governor of Poland, Grand Duke Constantine Pavlovich, who awarded him several orders. In 1826, Dwernicki was transferred to Warsaw, and in 1829, was named Brigadier general. Soon afterwards, he wrote a book on rules and regulations of Russian cavalry.

In the autumn of 1830, when the November Uprising began, Dwernicki was stationed in Sieradz, where he commanded 3rd Regiment of Mounted Rifles. He was immediately ordered to return to Warsaw, where he was tasked with creating new units of the Polish Army. By January 1831, Dwernicki created 18 squadrons, ready to enter combat.

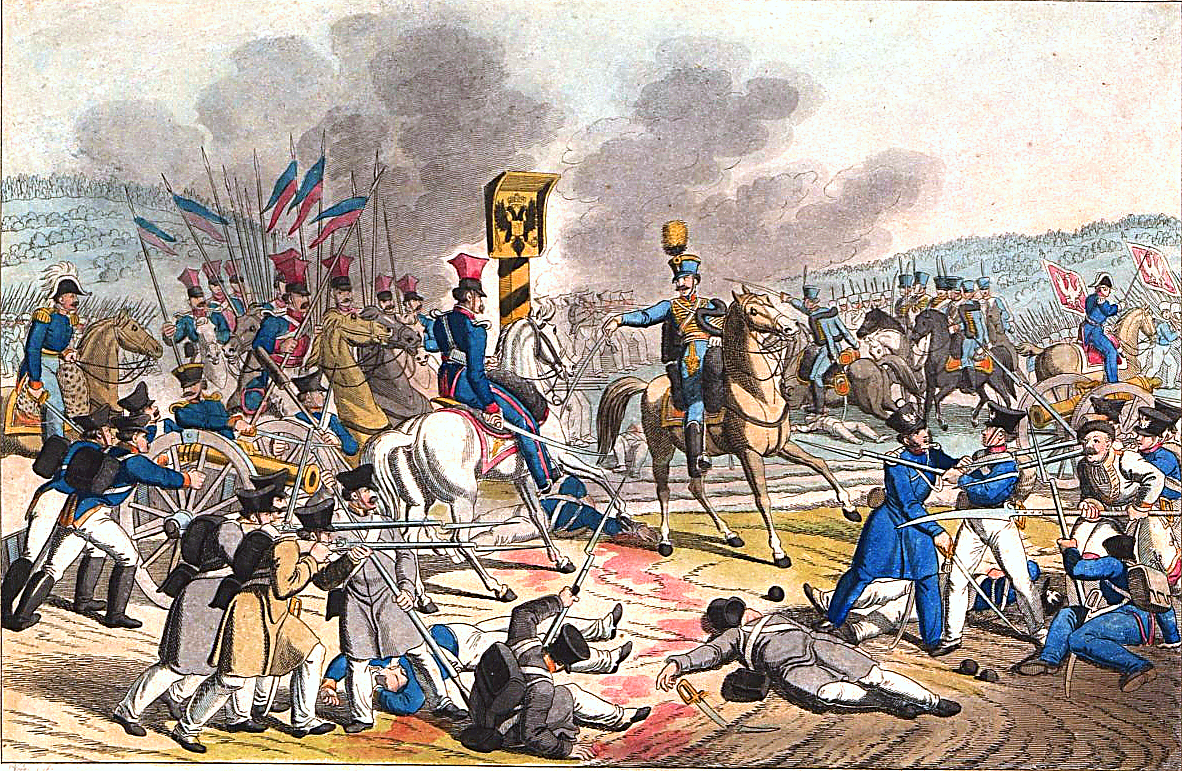
General Dwernicki Crossing the Austrian Border, by Georg Benedikt Wunder (1786-1858)

In late January 1831, the Polish National Government decided to send an army corps to Podolia, Volhynia and Ukraine. Dwernicki was named commandant of this unit, but in February 1831, when Russian Army entered Congress Poland, Commander in Chief Michal Gedeon Radziwill ordered him to stop the advance of General Teodor Geismar. On 14 February 1831 the Russians were defeated in the Battle of Stoczek, and Dwernicki was afterwards promoted to Divisional general. Following the battle, Dwernicki and his unit marched to Góra Kalwaria, and then engaged the Russians in several places, such as Warka, Kozienice, Puławy, Lublin and Zamość.

In early April 1831, Dwernicki crossed the Bug river, and marched into Volhynia, hoping to start the uprising in this province of former Polish–Lithuanian Commonwealth. His corps consisted of some 7,000 soldiers, but their situation quickly deteriorated. There were few volunteers, and local population did not respond to Dwernicki’s announcement to the residents of Volhynia, Podolia and Ukraine. On 11 April 1831 Dwernicki clashed with Russians near Poryck; four days later he fought the Russians again near Beresteczko. Disappointed by lack of support of local residents, he then marched to Podolia, but once again, he failed to rouse the population. Facing encirclement, on 27 April 1831 Dwernicki and his unit crossed the Russian - Austrian border near Radziwiłłów.

=== Temporary exile ===
The General was for some time interned by Austrian authorities, and in November 1831, he left for Paris, joining the Great Emigration. He immediately became involved in patriotic activities. Dwernicki was a founder and member of several organizations, and was a very popular activist, whose house was visited by such people, as Louis-Napoleon Bonaparte and Gilbert du Motier, Marquis de Lafayette. In 1834, he married his second wife, Maria Ludwika Alina de Brok (his first wife, Julianna, died after falling ill during the Volhynian raid of Dwernicki’s corps). Soon afterwards, they moved to London.

In 1848, Austrian government allowed Dwernicki to visit Galicia. His arrival at Lwów turned into a mass patriotic demonstration, and Dwernicki decided to stay in this city. He became a friend of Count Adam Zamoyski, who supported him financially, and invited Dwernicki to visit his real estate in Lopatyn near Brody. The General died on 23 November 1857 in Lopatyn, and was buried there.

== Sources ==
- A webpage of the Dwernicki family
- Biography of General Dwernicki at www.dzieje.pl
