= Kaliszanie =

Polish political group

Kaliszanie (Polish pronunciation: [kaliˈʂaɲɛ], those from Kalisz) or Kalisz Opposition was a semi-formal political group opposed to the conservative authorities of the Kingdom of Poland in the period preceding the outbreak of the November Uprising. The circle was formed around 1820 by brothers Bonawentura and Wincenty Niemojowski, two liberal politicians from the western provinces of Poland. The group was opposed to the government, yet supported only legal means of political struggle. Its main aims were the defence of the autonomy of Congress Poland within the Russian Empire and the Polish Constitution of 1815. They also played a pivotal role in founding of the National Patriotic Society.

Although opposing to any means of revolutionary changes, the Kaliszanie eventually supported the November Uprising and joined the ranks of the National Government in 1830. During the period of struggle against Russia the Kaliszanie practically dominated the government, controlling the ministries of internal affairs, treasury and war. Following the fall of the uprising in 1831, most of its members had to flee Poland and continued their political activities abroad, notably in London and Paris.

Among the noted politicians commonly associated with the movement were Alojzy and Józef Biernacki, Teodor and Teofil Morawski, Bonawentura, Jan Nepomucen and Wincenty Niemojowski, Antoni Jan and Władysław Tomasz Ostrowski, Ignacy Prądzyński, Stanisław Kaczkowski, Józef Komorowski, Jan Nepomucen Umiński and Walenty Zwierkowski.

== Notes and references ==
In-line:

General:

- Władysław Bortnowski (1976). Kaliszanie: kartki z dziejów Królestwa Polskiego (Kaliszanie: notes on the history of the Kingdom of Poland) (in Polish). Warsaw: Książka i Wiedza.
- Aleksander Gieysztor, ed. (1960–1962). Osiemnaście wieków Kalisza (18 Centuries of Kalisz) (in Polish). Poznań: Wydawnictwo Poznańskie. p. 1386.
- Jerzy Topolski (1999). Wielkopolska poprzez wieki (Greater Poland throughout the ages) (in Polish). Poznań: Wydawnictwo Poznańskie. p. 471. ISBN 83-7177-057-X.
