= Sejm of the Kingdom of Poland (disambiguation) =

The Sejm of the Kingdom of Poland can refer to:

- the Sejm of the Kingdom of Poland (15th century – 1569)
- the Sejm of the Polish–Lithuanian Commonwealth (1569–1795)
- the Sejm of the Congress Poland (1815–1831)
