= Józef Oleszkiewicz =

Polish-Lithuanian painter (c.1777–1830)

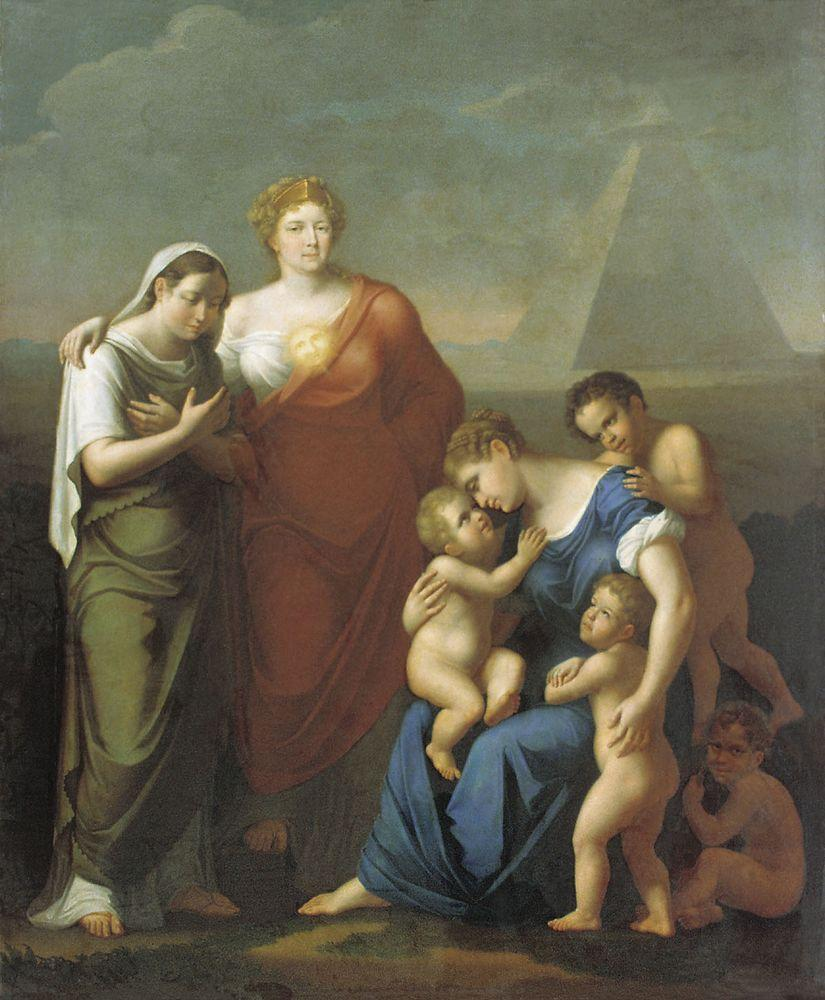
Maria Feodorovna Caring for the Poor (1812)

Józef Oleszkiewicz (Lithuanian: Juozapas Oleškevičius, Russian: Юзеф Иванович Олешкевич; c.1777 – 5 October 1830) was a Polish painter, active in Vilnius and then in Saint Petersburg during Tsar Alexander I's reign, known primarily for his portraits and his eccentric behavior.

== Biography ==
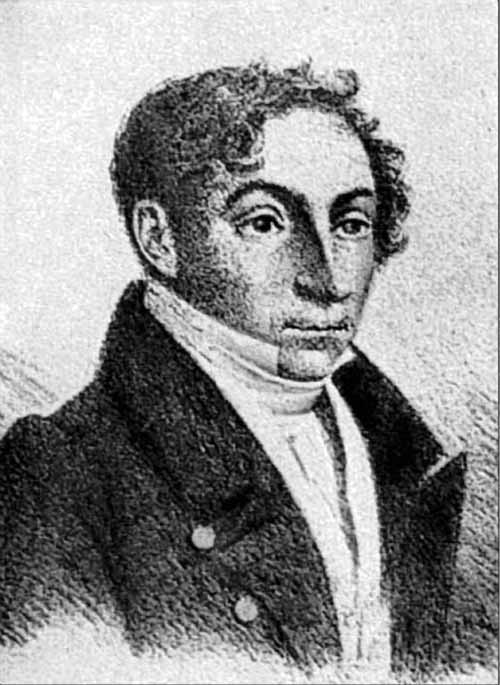
Oleszkiewicz as a young man (self-portrait?)

Oleszkiewicz was born in Šiluva. He came from an impoverished noble family; his father was a musician. With assistance from a family friend, he became a student at the University of Vilnius in 1797. He studied anatomy and physiology but switched to drawing and painting, taking classes with Franciszek Smuglewicz and Jan Rustem. He also copied paintings at the homes of wealthy people who knew his family. In 1801, he attracted the attention of Count Aleksander Chodkiewicz, a playwright, chemist and (later) a general, who was also a budding patron of the arts. Chodkiewicz provided him with the necessary funds to study abroad.

In 1803, he went to Paris and enrolled at the École des Beaux-Arts, where he studied with Jean-Simon Berthélemy and Jacques-Louis David. He returned to Vilnius in 1806 and had great success with several historical paintings at an exhibition there in 1809.

After failing to obtain a Professorship at the university, he went to Saint Petersburg. His painting of Tsarina Maria Feodorovna providing for the poor won him the title of "Academician" from the Imperial Academy of Arts in 1812. Oleszkiewicz soon became a much sought-after portrait painter, but he also created historical, religious and allegorical works.

In regard to the latter, he was a prominent Freemason, eventually becoming part of the upper hierarchy at the lodges in Saint Petersburg and Vilnius, until they were outlawed in 1822. His interests extended to theosophy, mysticism and the paranormal. He was also a vegetarian and an early advocate of animal rights, lived in a house full of cats, and gave most of his large income to the poor, in person. After predicting what would be the worst flood in Saint Petersburg's history, in 1824, he gained a reputation as a soothsayer, although floods there were certainly not uncommon. Later, he was the inspiration for "The Sorcerer"; a character who appears in Part III of the poetic drama Dziady by Adam Mickiewicz.

He died in Saint Petersburg in 1830. Despite being a vegetarian, it appears that he died from complications related to gout.

== Selected portraits ==
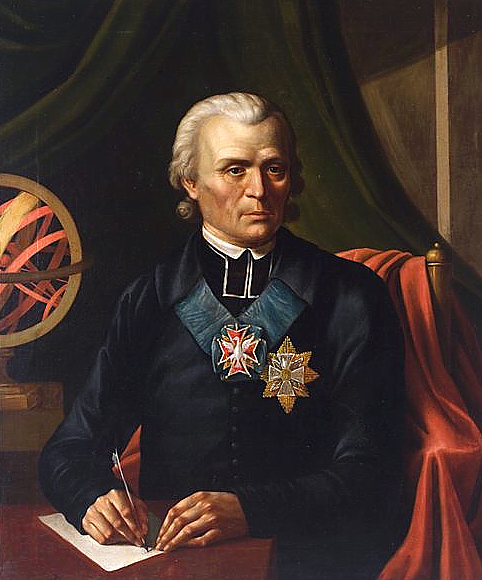
Marcin Odlanicki Poczobutt

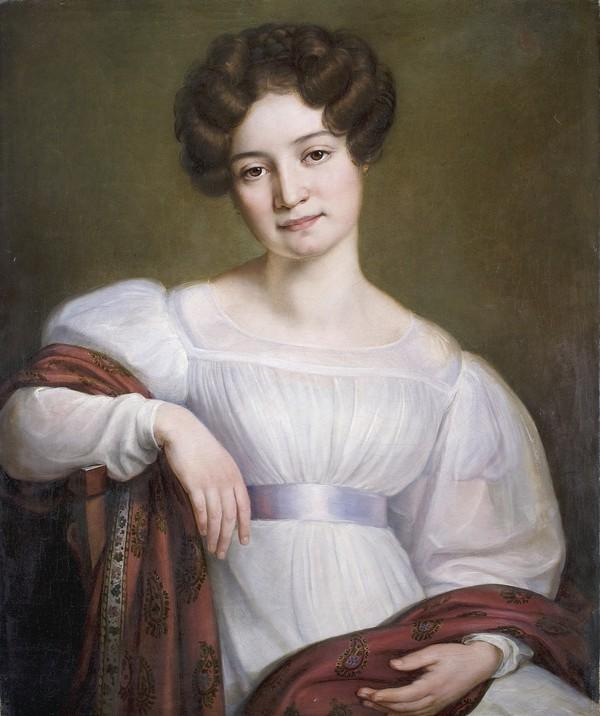
Mariya Volkonskaya

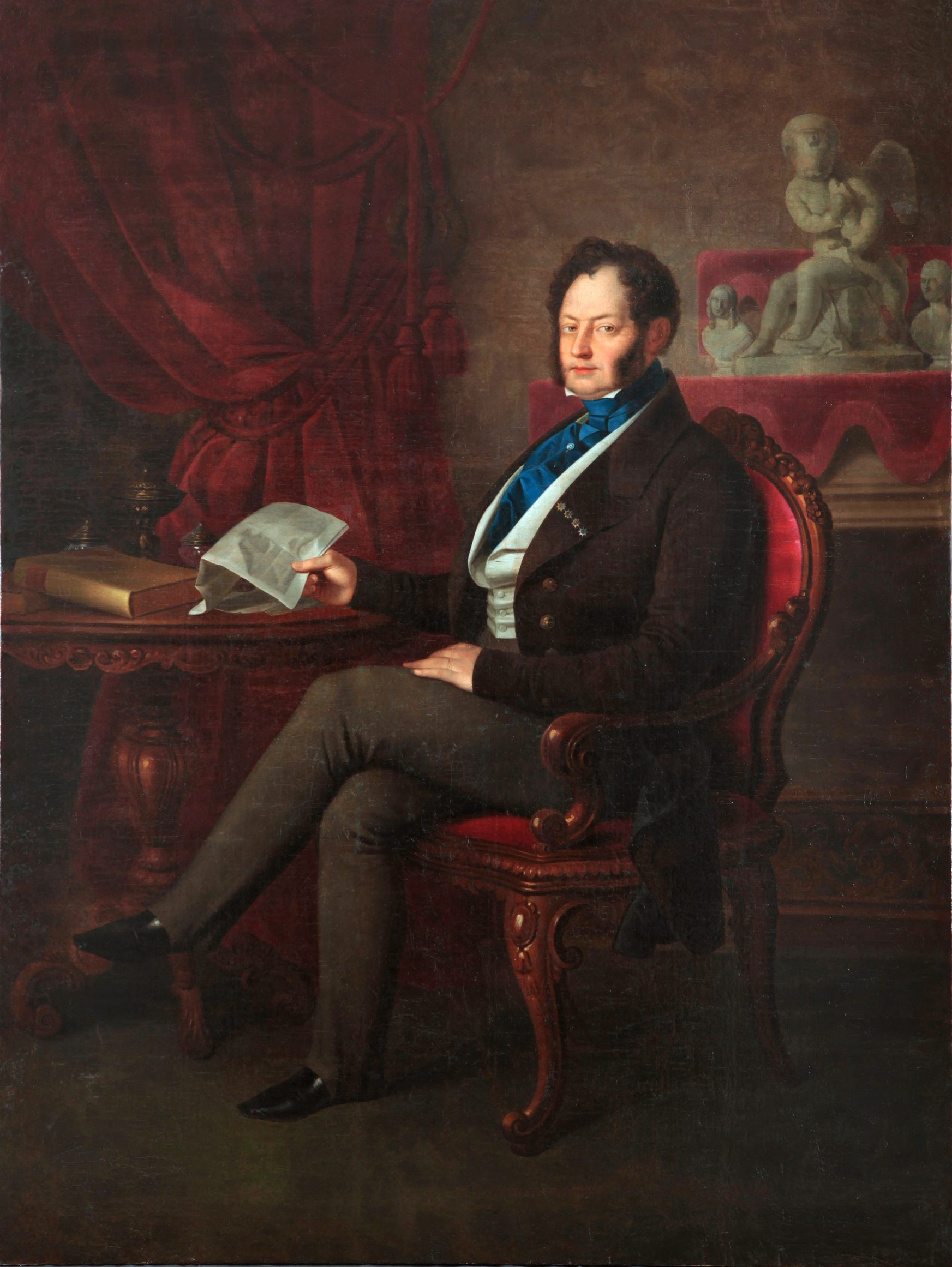
Michał Kleofas Ogiński

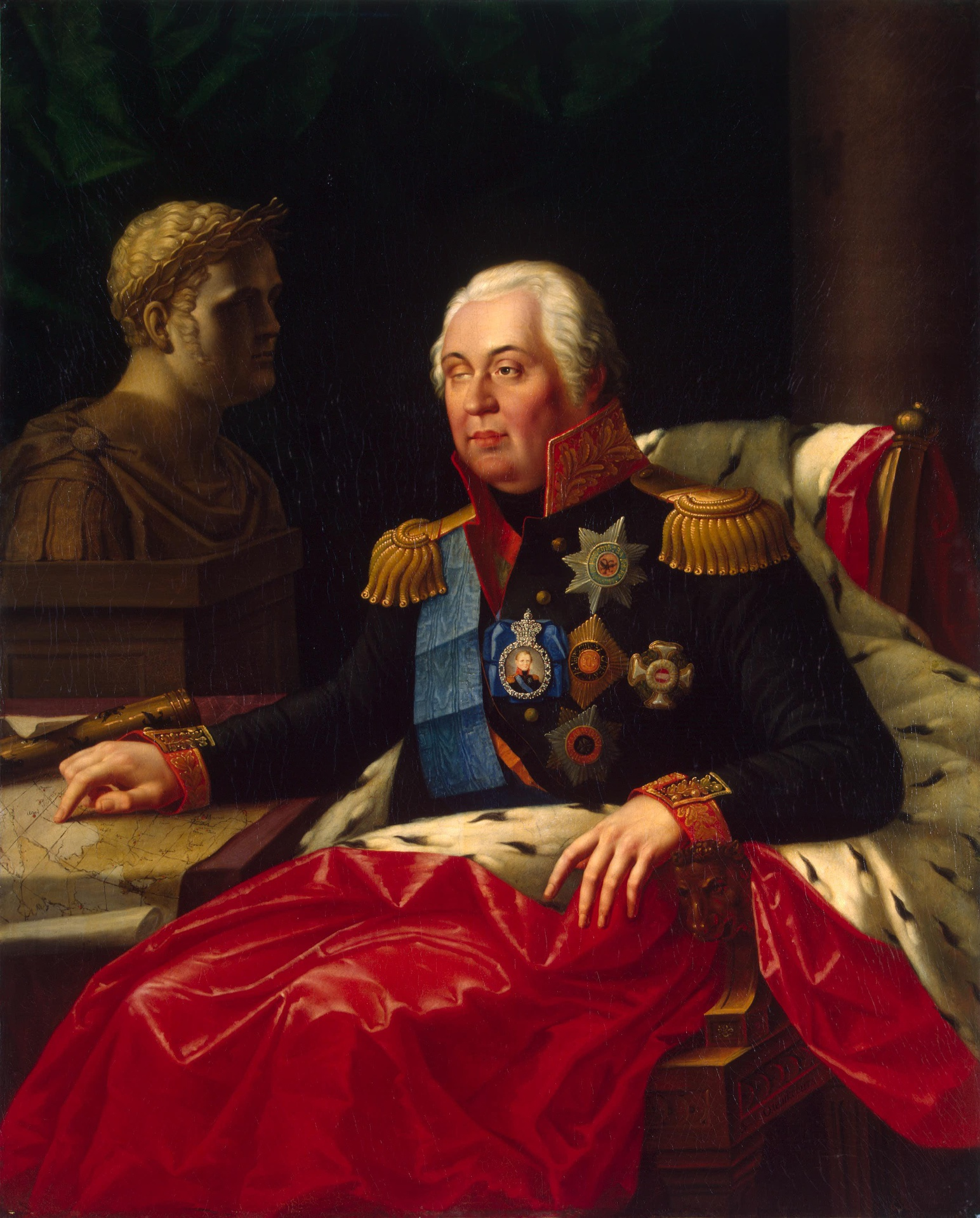
Mikhail Kutuzov

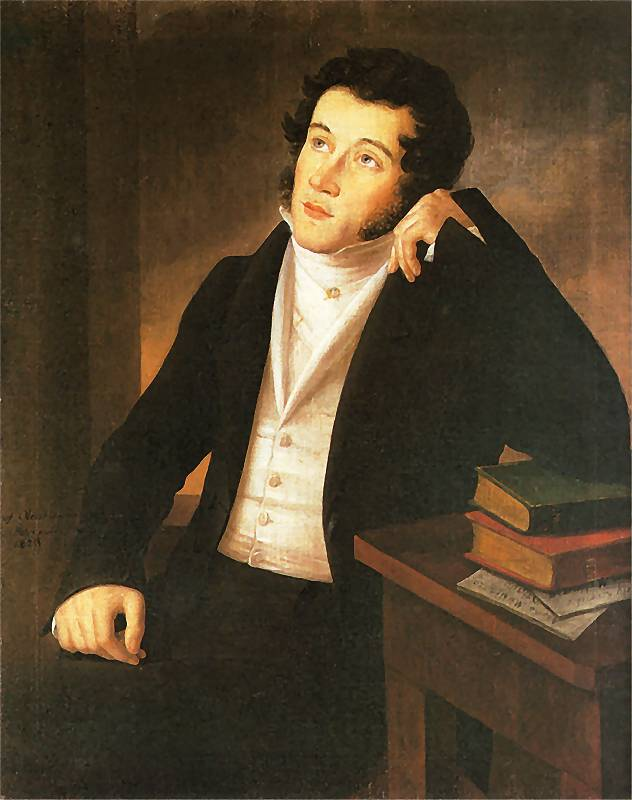
Adam Mickiewicz
