= Bonawentura Niemojowski =

Polish politician (1787–1835)

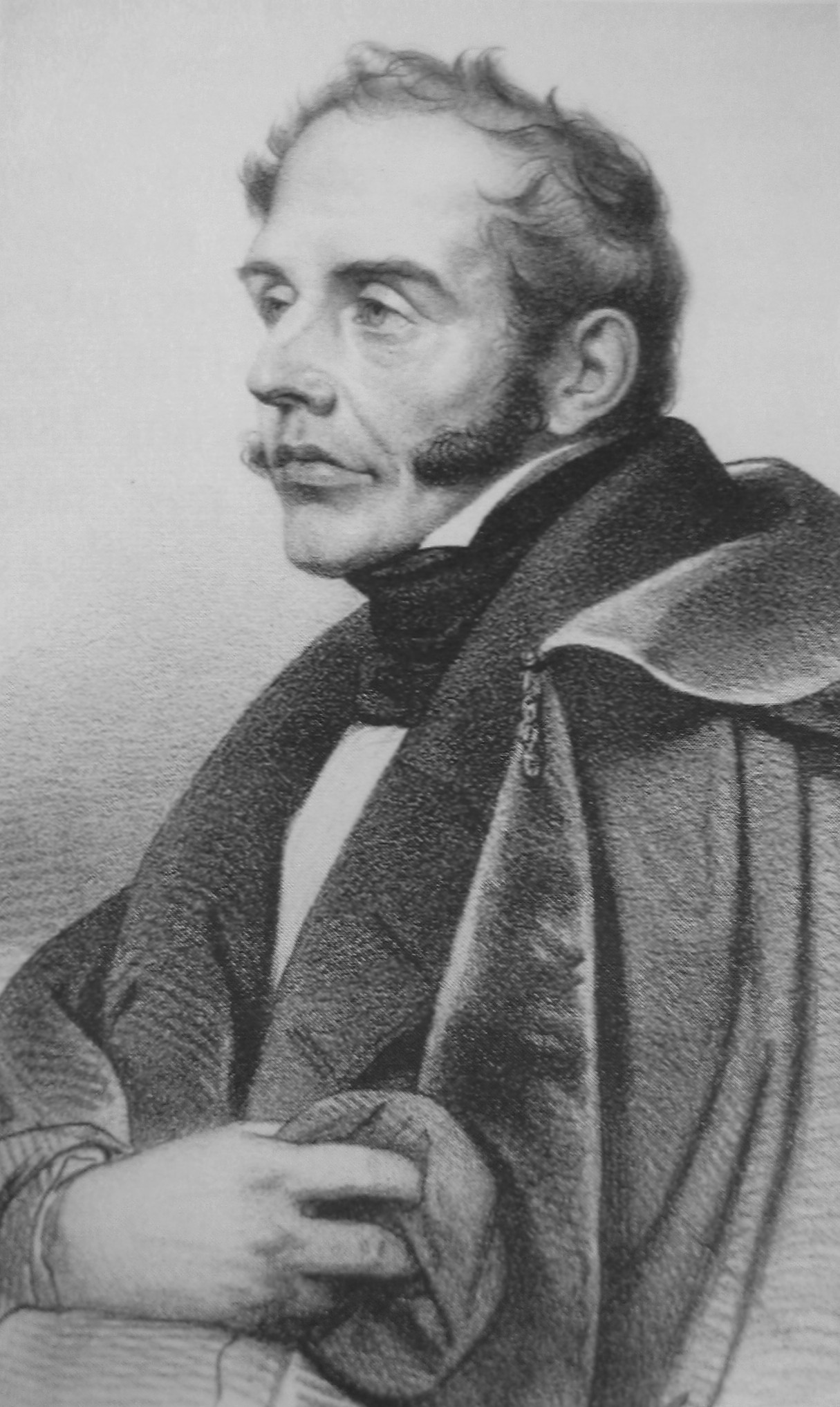
Bonawentura Niemojowski

Bonawentura Niemojowski (Polish pronunciation: [bɔnavɛnˈtura ɲɛmɔˈjɔfskʲi]; 4 September 1787 – 15 June 1835) was a Polish lawyer, writer and politician. He was one of the leaders of Polish National Government during the November Uprising.

== Biography ==
Bonawentura Niemojowski was born in Słupia near Kępno to a noble (szlachta) family (Wierusz Coat of Arms). He first studied in the Piarist college in Warsaw, and later abroad in Paris. After returning to Poland, he became elected from the Kalisz Voivodeship to the Sejm (parliament) of Congress Poland. He was a member of the liberal Kalisz Opposition (Kaliszanie) in the parliament since 1820; the group was named after the voivodeship which he and his brother, Wincenty Niemojowski, both notable members of the group, were from.

In 1821 Bonawentura married Wiktoria Lubowidzka, with whom he had two children.

In the Sejm, Bonawentura soon became a major nuisance to the Russian officials. One of the demands of the Kalisz faction in 1820, regarding independence of the judiciary, led the tsar Alexander I of Russia (who was also king of Congress Poland, the Russian Empire puppet state) to suspend the Polish parliament for a period of five years; Niemojowski was dismissed from the parliament before that and subject to house arrest for over a year. After the parliament was reestablished, he was a vocal opponent to the movement to make the parliament debates secret, and criticized the tsar's and Russian officials breaking the Constitution of the Congress Poland. In 1830 tsar ordered the Senate of Poland to annul Niemojowski's and his brother's mandates on a technicality in order to bar them from attending the parliament sessions.

Although opposed to any means of revolutionary changes, the Kaliszanie eventually supported the November Uprising and joined the ranks of the National Government in 1830. During the period of struggle against Russia, the Kaliszanie practically dominated the government, controlling the ministries of internal affairs, treasury and war. With the November Uprising of 1830 Bonawentura joined the revolutionary government, taking, among others, posts of minister of justice and later minister of internal affairs. On 8 September 1831 he replaced general Jan Krukowiecki as the leader of Polish National Government. Where Krukowiecki wanted to negotiate with the Russians, Niemojowski represented the radical arm of the insurgents, opposed the negotiations and in favor of continuing the uprising. He supported the defense of Warsaw. After the fall of Warsaw he moved to Modlin. He resigned his post on 23 September, once the majority of the government decided to support capitulation, and was succeeded by general Maciej Rybiński. Eventually, with the collapse of the uprising, he escaped to France, joining the Great Emigration; he lived in Paris and Brussels and was an activist in the Komitet Tymczasowy Emigracji (Emigration's Temporary Committee).

== Works ==
Niemojowski published several political works:

- Głosy posła kaliskiego na sejmie Królestwa Polskiego 1818
- L’autokrate et la constitution du rayaume de Pologne (Brussels 1833)
- O ostatnich wypadkach rewolucji polskiej (Paris 1833)
- Kilka słów do współrodaków z powodu fałszów przez J.B. Ostrowskiego w piśmie „Nowa Polska” (Paris 1834)

== See also ==
- Wincenty Niemojowski, brother, politician
