= Grand Duke Konstantin Pavlovich of Russia =

19th-century Russian grand duke

Konstantin Pavlovich
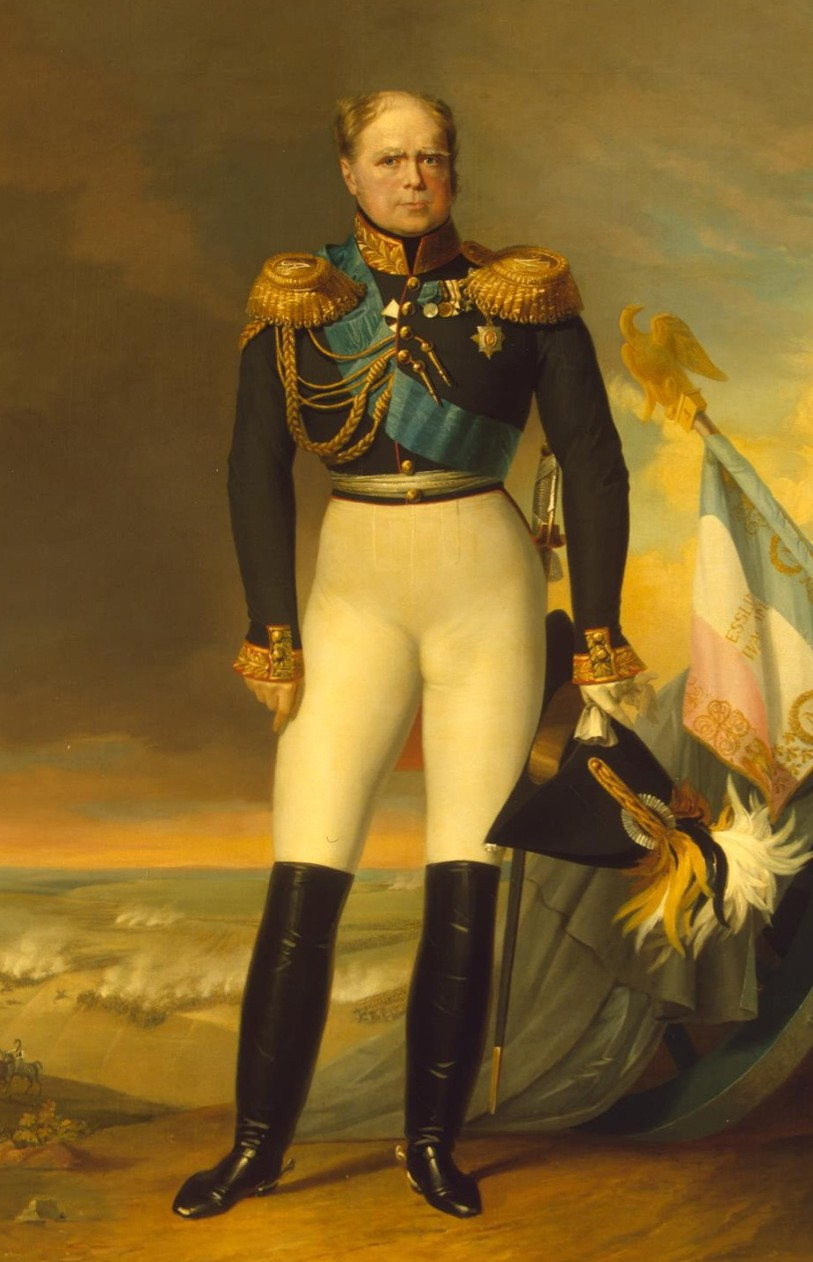
- Portrait by George Dawe 1834
- Born: 27 April 1779; Tsarskoye Selo, Saint Petersburg Governorate, Russian Empire
- Died: 15 June 1831 (aged 52); Vitebsk, Russian Empire
- Burial: Peter and Paul Cathedral
- Spouse: Princess Juliane of Saxe-Coburg-Saalfeld (m. 1796; ann. 1809) Joanna Grudzińska (m. 1820)
- Issue: 3 children with mistresses (Pavel, Konstantin, Konstasia)
- House: Holstein-Gottorp-Romanov
- Father: Paul I of Russia
- Mother: Sophie Dorothea of Württemberg

Konstantin Pavlovich (Russian: Константи́н Па́влович; 8 May [O.S. 27 April] 1779 – 27 June [O.S. 15 June] 1831) was a grand duke of Russia and the second son of Emperor Paul I and Sophie Dorothea of Württemberg. He was the heir presumptive for most of his elder brother Alexander I's reign, but had secretly renounced his claim to the throne in 1823. For 25 days after the death of Alexander I; from 19 November (O.S.)/1 December to 14 December (O.S.)/26 December 1825, he was known as His Imperial Majesty Konstantin I Emperor and Sovereign of Russia, although he never reigned and never acceded to the throne. His younger brother Nicholas became tsar in 1825. The succession controversy became the pretext of the Decembrist revolt.

Konstantin was known to eschew court etiquette and to take frequent stands against the wishes of his brother Alexander I, for which he is remembered fondly in Russia, but in his capacity as the governor of Poland he is remembered as a hated ruler.

== Early life ==
Konstantin was born in Tsarskoye Selo on 27 April 1779, the second son of the Tsesarevich Paul Petrovich and his wife Maria Fyodorovna, daughter of Friedrich II Eugen, Duke of Württemberg. Of all Paul's children, Konstantin most closely resembled his father both physically and mentally.

His paternal grandmother Catherine the Great named him after Constantine the Great, the founder of the Eastern Roman Empire. A medal with antique figures was struck to commemorate his birth; it bears the inscription "Back to Byzantium" which clearly alludes to Catherine's Greek Plan. According to the British ambassador James Harris:

"Prince Potemkin's mind is constantly taken up with the idea of creating an empire in the East; he has managed to fascinate the Empress with these feelings, and she proved so subject to his chimeras that she christened the new-born Grand Prince Constantine, gave him as nursemaid a Greek by the name of Helen, and talks in her own circles about how to place him on the throne of the Eastern empire. At the same time she is setting up a town at Tsarskoe Selo to be called Konstantingorod."

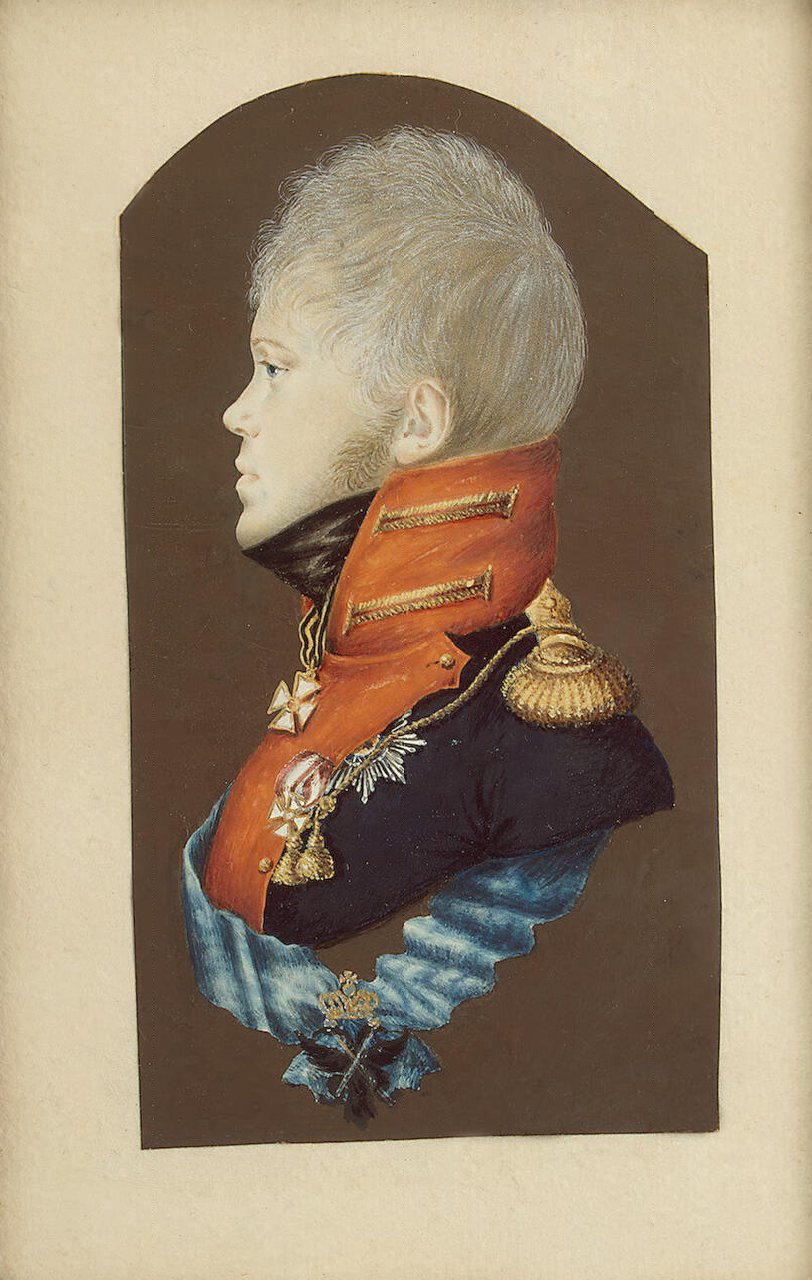
Grand Duke Konstantin of Russia, son of Emperor Paul

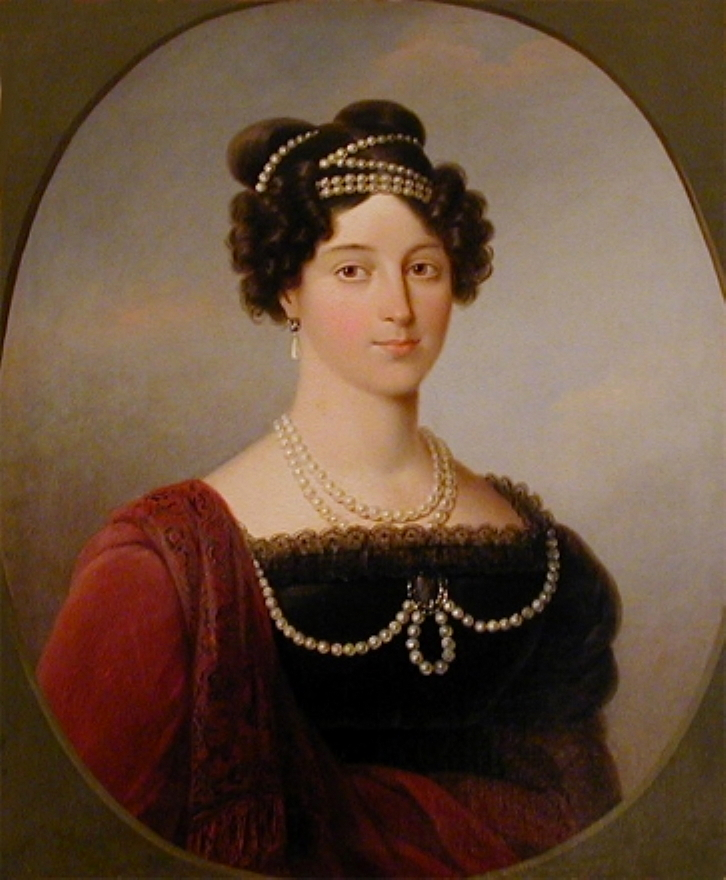
Princess Juliane of Saxe-Coburg-Saalfeld, later Anna Feodorovna

The direction of the boy's upbringing was entirely in the hands of his grandmother, the empress Catherine II. As in the case of her eldest grandson (afterwards the emperor Alexander I), she regulated every detail of his physical and mental education; but in accordance with her usual custom, she left the carrying out of her views to the men who were in her confidence. Count Nikolai Saltykov was supposed to be the actual tutor, but he too in his turn transferred the burden to another, interfering personally only on exceptional occasions, and exercised no influence upon the character of the passionate, restless and headstrong boy. The only person who exerted a responsible influence was Cesar La Harpe, who was tutor-in-chief from 1783 to May 1795 and educated both the empress's grandsons.

Catherine arranged Konstantin's marriage as she had Alexander's; Juliane of Saxe-Coburg-Saalfeld, 14, and Konstantin, 16, were married on 26 February 1796. As Caroline Bauer recorded in her memoirs, "The brutal Constantine treated his consort like a slave. So far did he forget all good manners and decency that, in the presence of his rough officers, he made demands on her, as his property, which will hardly bear being hinted of."

Due to his violent treatment and suffering health problems as a result, Juliane separated from Konstantin in 1799; she eventually settled in Switzerland. An attempt by Konstantin in 1814 to convince her to return broke down in the face of her firm opposition.

== Napoleonic Wars ==
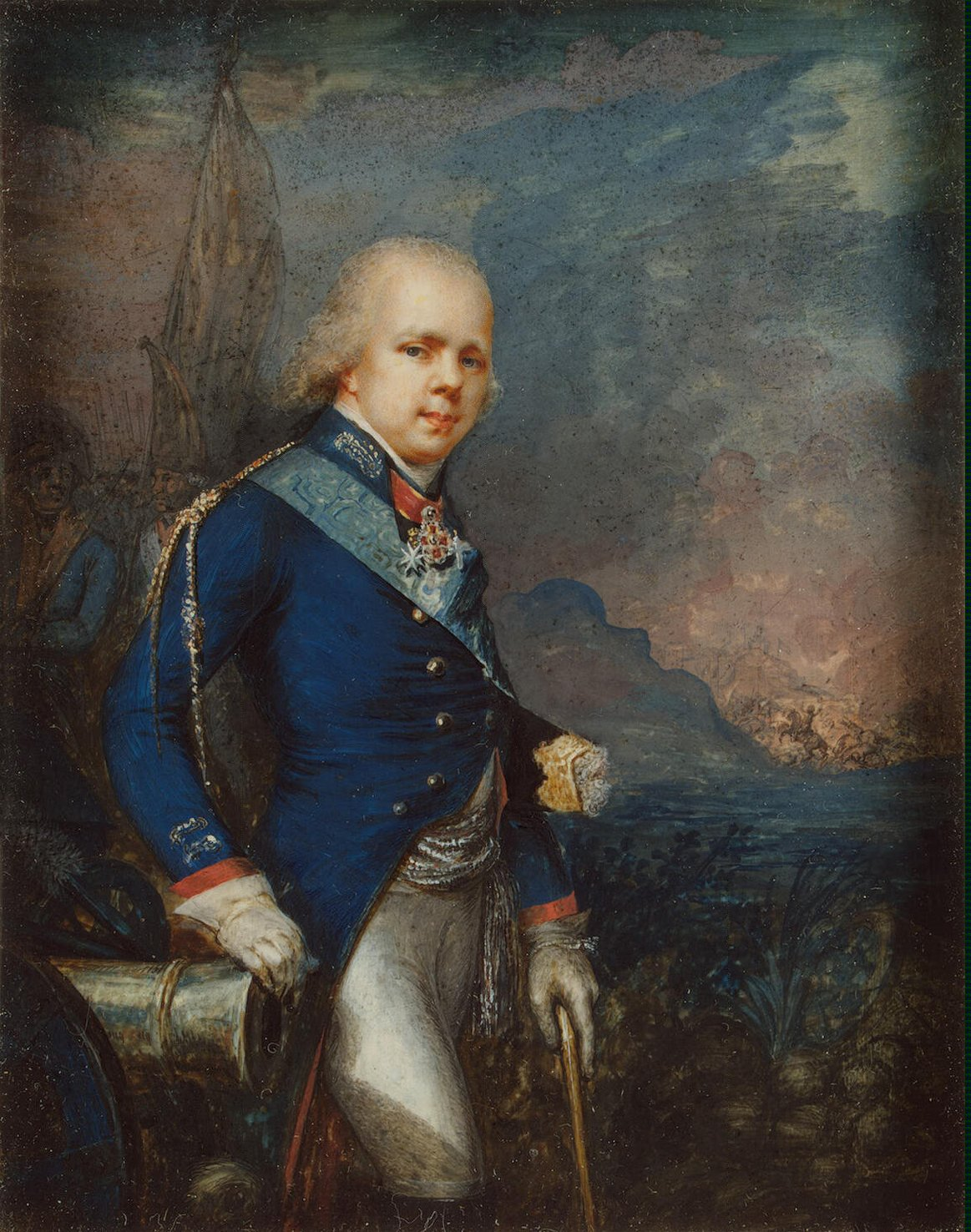
Portrait of Konstantin at the Battle of Novi, a Russian victory

During this time, Konstantin's first campaign took place under the leadership of Suvorov. The battle of Bassignana was lost by Konstantin's fault; but at Novi he distinguished himself by personal bravery, so that the emperor Paul bestowed on him the title of tsesarevich, which according to the fundamental law of the constitution belonged only to the heir to the throne. Though it cannot be proved that this action of the tsar denoted any far-reaching plan, it yet shows that Paul already distrusted the grand-duke Alexander.

Konstantin never tried to secure the throne. After his father's death in 1801, he led a disorderly bachelor life. He abstained from politics, but remained faithful to his military inclinations, without manifesting anything more than a preference for the externalities of the service. In command of the Imperial Guards during the campaign of 1805, he had a share of the responsibility for the Russian defeat at the battle of Austerlitz, however he did capture the first French Imperial Eagle in the coalition's history; while in 1807 neither his skill nor his fortune in war showed any improvement.

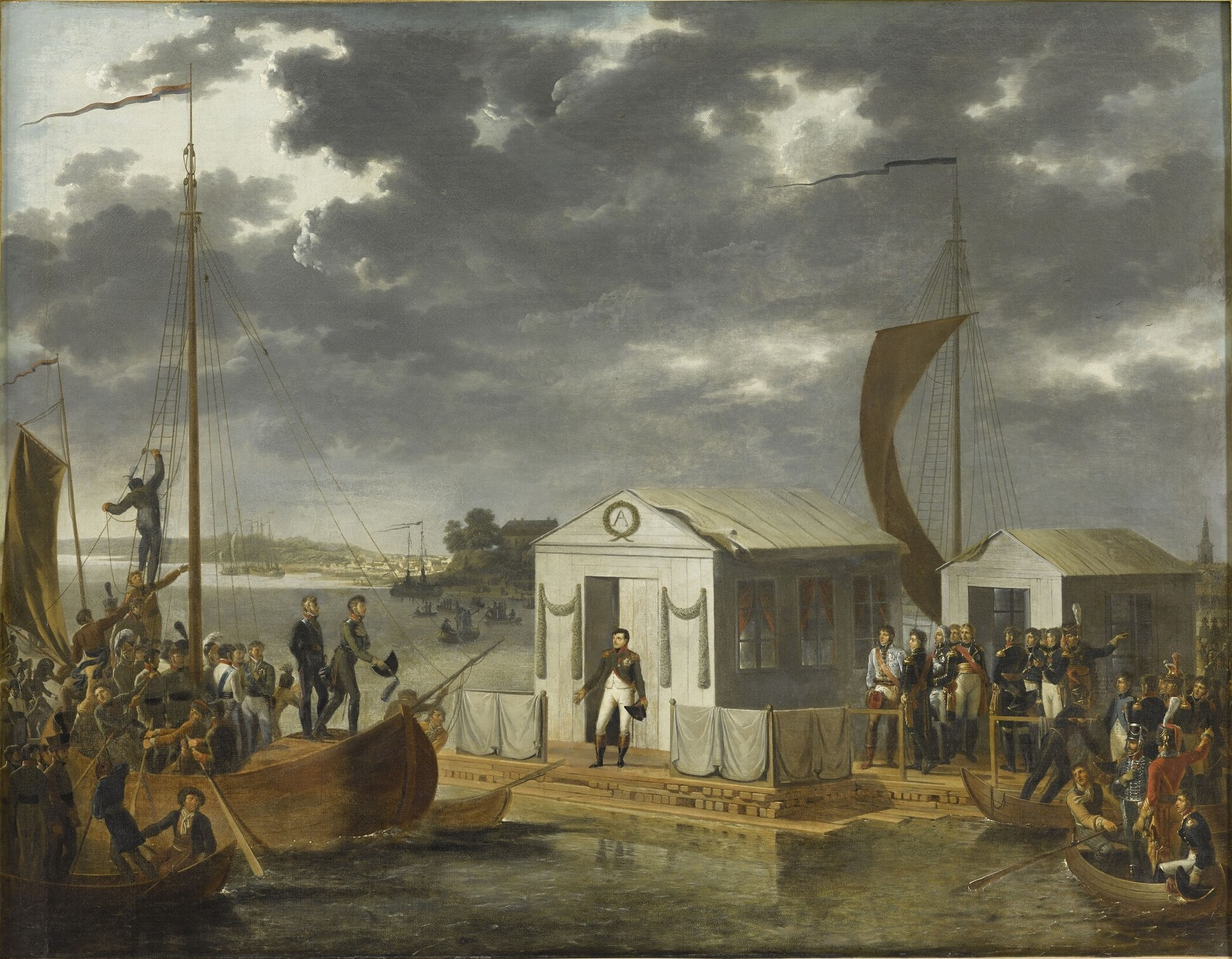
The Meeting of Napoleon I and Tsar Alexander I at Tilsit by Adolphe Roehn, 1808. Konstantin is shown behind his brother on the left.

After the peace of Tilsit he became an ardent admirer of Napoleon and an upholder of the Russo-French alliance. He therefore lost the confidence of his brother Alexander; to the latter, the French alliance was merely a means to an end. This view was not held by Konstantin; even in 1812, after the fall of Moscow, he pressed for a speedy conclusion of peace with Napoleon, and, like field marshal Kutuzov, he too opposed the policy which carried the war across the Russian frontier to victorious conclusion upon French soil. His personal behaviour towards both his own men and French prisoners was eccentric and cruel.

During the campaign, Barclay de Tolly was twice obliged to send him away from the army due to his disorderly conduct. His share in the battles in Germany and France was insignificant. At the battle of Dresden, on 26 August 1813, his military knowledge failed him at the decisive moment, but in March 1814 at the battle of La Fère-Champenoise he distinguished himself by personal bravery. In Paris the grand duke excited public ridicule by the manifestation of his petty military fads. His first visit was to the stables, and it was said that he had been marching and drilling even in his private rooms.

== Governor of the Kingdom of Poland ==
Konstantin only became important in political history when his brother, Tsar Alexander, installed him in Congress Poland as de facto viceroy (however, he was not the 'official' viceroy, namestnik of the Kingdom of Poland), with the task of the militarization and discipline of Poland. In Congress Poland, he received the post of commander-in-chief of the forces of the kingdom to which was added in 1819 the command of the Lithuanian troops and of those of the Russian provinces that had belonged to the Polish–Lithuanian Commonwealth (so called Western Krai). In this capacity, he was in charge of appointing military leaders, including those in Poland. Each of these officers was required to serve Konstantin's goal of making the Polish army a version of Russia's military.

Alexander's policies were liberal by the standards of Restoration Europe. Classical liberals enjoyed freedoms of education, scholarship and economic development, but key deficiencies in Poland's autonomy like lack of control over the budget, military, and trade left Poles hungry for more. The Kalisz Opposition, led by the brothers Bonawentura and Wincenty Niemojowski, pressed for reforms including more independence for the judiciary. Alexander, calling their actions an "abuse" of liberty, suspended the Polish parliament (Sejm) for five years and authorised Konstantin to maintain order in the kingdom by any means necessary.

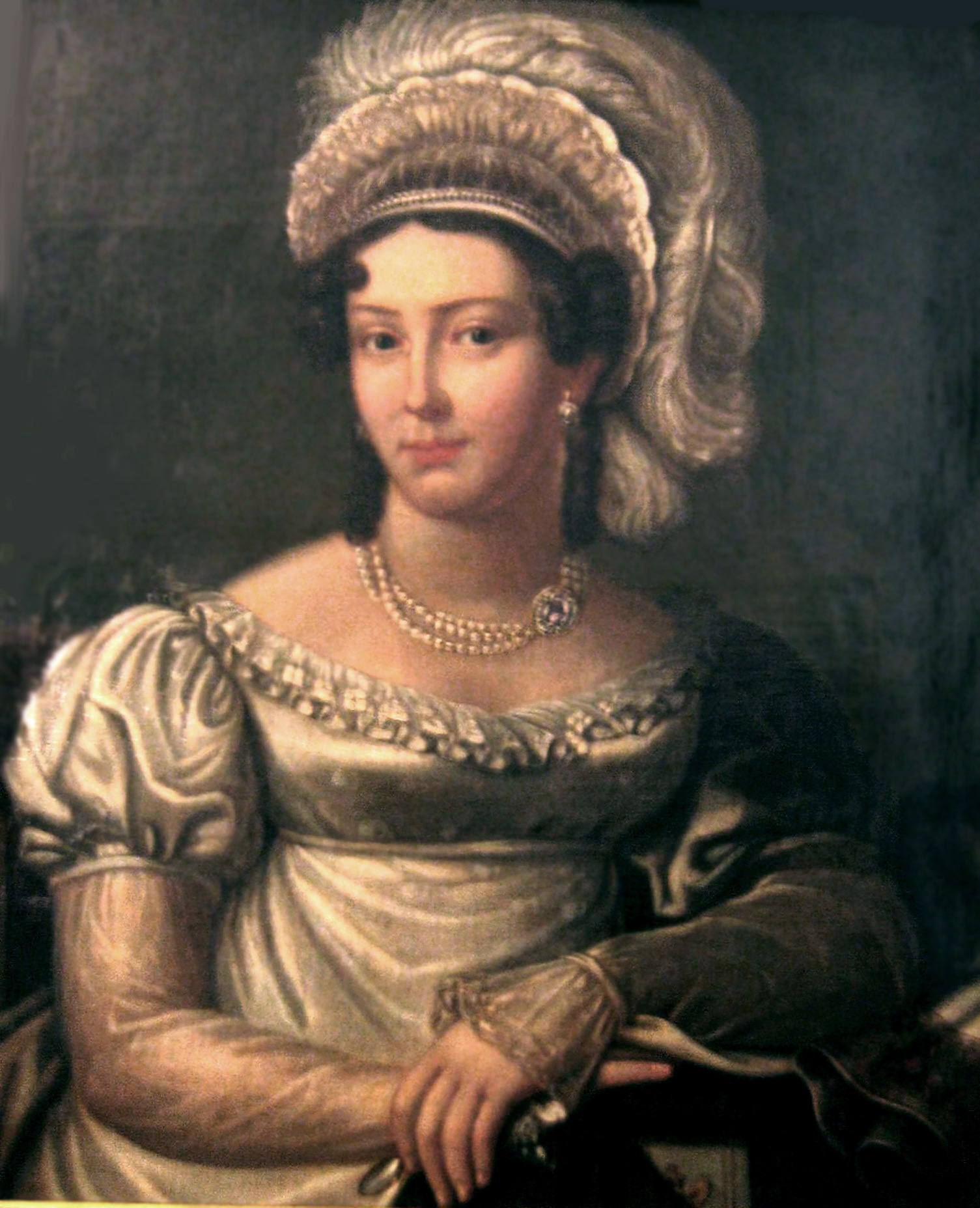
Joanna Grudzińska

Konstantin, attempting to carry out his brother's mandate to silence dissent, strengthened the secret police (Ochrana) and suppressed the Polish patriotic movements, leading to further popular discontent. Konstantin also harassed the liberal opposition, replaced Poles with Russians in important posts in local administration and the army, and often insulted and assaulted subordinates, which led to conflicts in the officer corps. The Sejm, until then mostly dominated by supporters of the personal union with Russia, saw his actions as disobedient to the very constitution of which he felt personally proud. This also led to him being mocked, which he did not help by sending adjutants with threats to those he deemed "guilty" of such behavior like Wirydianna Fiszerowa. Nevertheless, Konstantin was an ardent supporter of Polish musicians, such as Maria Agata Szymanowska and Frédéric Chopin.

After 19 years of separation, the marriage of Konstantin and Juliane was formally annulled on 20 March 1820. Two months later, on 27 May, Konstantin married the Polish Countess Joanna Grudzińska, who was given the title of Her Serene Highness Princess of Łowicz. In connection with the marriage, he decided to renounce any claim to the Russian succession, doing so (but not making it public) in 1822. After the marriage, he became increasingly attached to his new home of Poland.

== Succession crisis and Decembrist Uprising ==
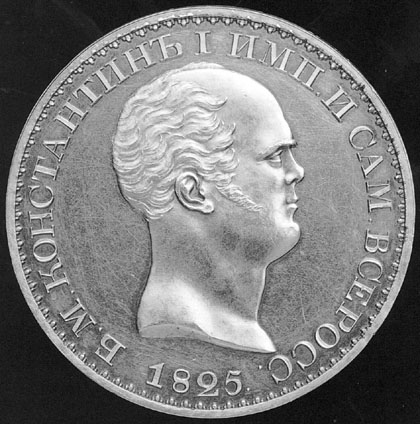
Constantine ruble, a rare silver coin produced during the Russian interregnum of 1825 but never issued

When Alexander I died on 1 December 1825, Grand Duke Nicholas had Konstantin proclaimed emperor in Saint Petersburg. When the news of his proclamation reached Warsaw, Konstantin formally abdicated the throne. When that became public knowledge, the Northern Society scrambled in secret meetings to convince regimental leaders not to swear allegiance to Nicholas. The efforts would culminate in the Decembrist revolt.

Under Nicholas I, Konstantin maintained his position in Poland. Differences soon arose between Konstantin and his younger brother, however, because of the part taken by Poles in the Decembrist conspiracy. Konstantin hindered the discovery of the organized plotting for independence, which had been going on in Poland for many years, and held obstinately to the belief that the army and the bureaucracy were loyally devoted to the Russian Empire. The eastern policy of the Tsar and the Turkish War in 1828-29 caused a fresh breach between them. Because of Konstantin's opposition, the Polish army took no part in the war.

== Failed assassination and November Uprising ==
An assassination attempt was made on the life of Grand Duke Konstantin, which precipitated the November 1830 insurrection in Warsaw (the November Uprising). After the attempt on Konstantin's life, a secret court was set up to prosecute those who were responsible. "It was learned that Nicholas had ordered the Grand Duke Konstantin ... to start an energetic investigation and court-martial the culprits ... the committee at its session of 27 November decided irrevocably to start the revolution on the evening of the 29th, at 6pm." Like the assassination, the recruitment of army units by the rebels failed; only two units joined them, and only the capture of the armory and the subsequent arming of the populace kept the revolt alive. Konstantin saw the revolt as a strictly Polish affair and refused to use troops, as he could have, because it was foolish politically. He could trust his Russian troops, but to use them might be considered a violation of the kingdom's independence and even an act of war.

Because of that setback, he was limited to the resources around him. If he decided to intervene, it would require a different source of manpower. He was limited to the handful of Polish troops he could gather together. Konstantin thus refused to send his troops against the revolutionaries: "The Poles have started this disturbance, and it's Poles that must stop it", and he left the suppression of the revolt in the hands of the Polish government.

Polish Prince Ksawery Lubecki, realizing that the insurgents had formed no government by midnight, assembled some members of the council and other prominent personalities on his own initiative. They sent a delegation to the grand duke, but when he stated again that he did not wish to intervene in any way, the committees decided to take matters into their own hands. Konstantin's involvement remained minimal, showing considerable restraint in not wanting to use Russian troops to help put down the rebellion. The timid response that he did give was that he would not attack the city of Warsaw without giving it 48 hours' notice, that he would intercede between the emperor and the Polish Kingdom, and would not order Lithuanian troops to enter Poland. What he was trying to accomplish was to remain neutral at all costs, which led to a belief among his fellow Russians that he was more sensitive towards the Polish independence than to Russian dominance. The securing of neutrality from Konstantin gave the Polish government the feeling that Russia would not attack Poland and gave it the chance effectively to quash the uprising.

After ensuring Russian neutrality, Konstantin retreated behind Russian lines. That further confused the Polish government regarding its status with Russia because of a previous Russian promise to help put down the rebellion. The patriotic Poles could not have been more pleased. Konstantin, on 3 December, retreated toward Russia. Following the failure of the uprising, Konstantin expressed admiration for the valor of the Polish insurgents. The policy of neutrality at all costs has led to Konstantin being viewed two ways through the scope of history. Either he would be viewed by the Russian royal family as weak and sympathetic to the Poles, or he would be seen as a seed for the idea of a soon to be independent Poland, but he was effectively only trying to avoid a wider war.

== Death and legacy ==
Konstantin died of cholera in Vitebsk (now in Belarus) on 27 June 1831 and did not live to see the suppression of the revolution. His frequent stands against the wishes of the Imperial Family were perceived in Russia as brave, even gallant. In Poland, he was viewed as a tyrant, hated by the military and civilian population alike, and in Polish literature, Konstantin is portrayed as a cruel despot.

== Archives ==
Konstantin's letters to his grandfather, Frederick II Eugene, Duke of Württemberg, (together with letters from his siblings) written between 1795 and 1797, are preserved in the State Archive of Stuttgart (Hauptstaatsarchiv Stuttgart) in Stuttgart, Germany.

== Honours ==
- Russian Empire:
  - Knight of St. Andrew, 1779
  - Knight of St. Alexander Nevsky, 1779
  - Knight of St. Anna, 1st Class, 1779
  - Grand Cross of the Order of St. John of Jerusalem, 1798
  - Knight of St. George, 3rd Class, 1806; 2nd Class, 8 October 1813
  - Knight of St. Vladimir, 1st Class, 11 November 1807
- Habsburg Monarchy: Grand Cross of the Military Order of Maria Theresa, 1799
- Two Sicilies:
  - Knight of St. Januarius, 1800
  - Grand Cross of St. Ferdinand and Merit
- Sweden:
  - Knight of the Seraphim, 24 November 1800
  - Grand Cross of the Sword, 1st Class, 24 April 1814
- Kingdom of Prussia: Knight of the Black Eagle, 7 April 1805
- France:
  - French Empire: Grand Eagle of the Legion of Honour, 7 July 1807
  - Kingdom of France: Knight of the Holy Spirit, 1815
- Kingdom of Bavaria: Grand Cross of the Military Order of Max Joseph, 30 April 1814
- Kingdom of Sardinia: Knight of the Annunciation, 1814
- Württemberg: Grand Cross of the Military Merit Order, 1814; with Blue Band, 1818
- Spain: Knight of the Golden Fleece, 13 April 1817
- Netherlands: Grand Cross of the Military William Order, 19 November 1818
- Kingdom of Saxony: Knight of the Rue Crown, 1824

== Ancestry ==
Ancestors of Grand Duke Konstantin Pavlovich of Russia

8. Charles Frederick, Duke of Holstein-Gottorp
4. Peter III of Russia
9. Grand Duchess Anna Petrovna of Russia
2. Paul I of Russia
10. Christian August, Prince of Anhalt-Zerbst
5. Catherine II of Russia
11. Princess Johanna Elisabeth of Holstein-Gottorp
1. Grand Duke Konstantin Pavlovich of Russia
12. Charles Alexander, Duke of Württemberg
6. Frederick II Eugene of Württemberg
13. Princess Marie Auguste of Thurn and Taxis
3. Duchess Sophie Dorothea of Württemberg
14. Frederick William, Margrave of Brandenburg-Schwedt
7. Princess Friederike of Brandenburg-Schwedt
15. Princess Sophia Dorothea of Prussia
