= Aleksander Raczyński =

Polish portrait painter (1822–1889)

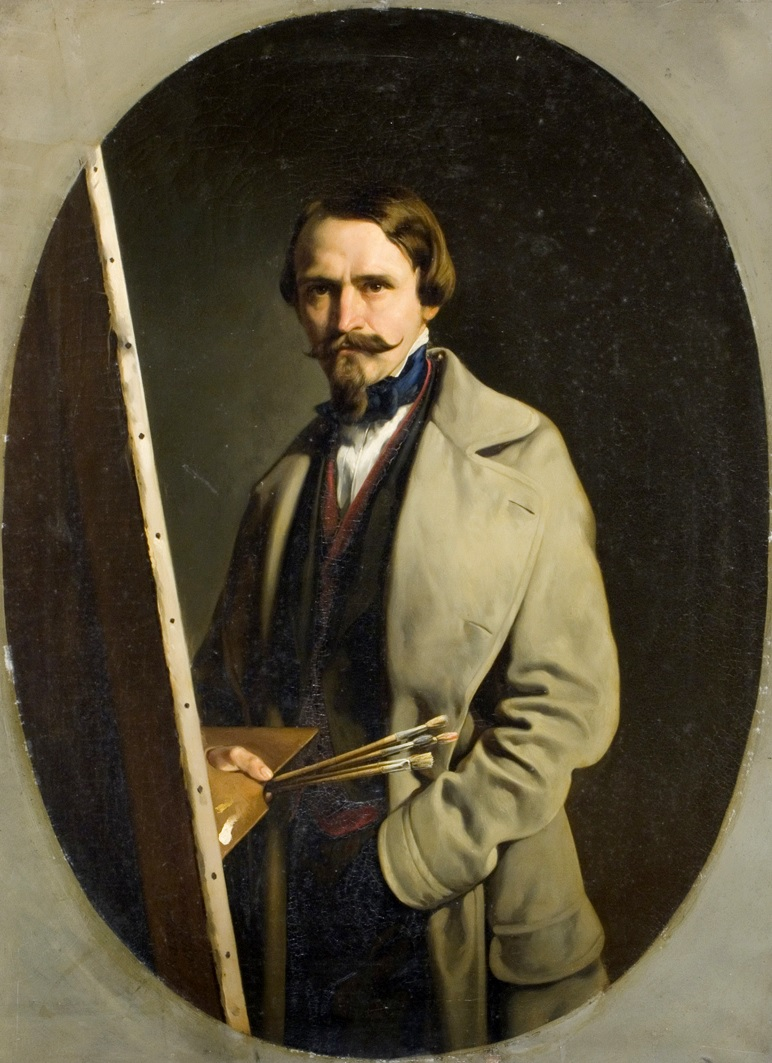
Self-portrait (date unknown)

Aleksander Raczyński (1822 – 16 November 1889) was a Polish portrait painter.

== Biography ==
He had his first art lessons in his native Lwów with Jan Maszkowski. After 1846, he studied at the Academy of Fine Arts Vienna and the Academy of Fine Arts, Munich. Later, he attended the École des Beaux-Arts in Paris. During his student years, he created a large number of humorous drawings and cartoons depicting the life of the artistic community. They are now in the collection of the Ossolineum in Wrocław.

In 1857, he travelled to Italy and, upon his return, settled permanently in Lwów. where he opened a portrait studio. Among his best-known sitters were Wincenty Pol, Aleksander Fredro, Józef Dwernicki, Maciej Rybiński and Gregory Yakhimovich. He often painted from photographs. His friend, Artur Grottger, provided the landscape backgrounds for many of Raczyński's portraits.

He also painted sacred and historical subjects, as well as contemporary scenes from the Crimean War. In 1855, he engraved the Coats-of-Arms for a new edition of the Herbarz Polski (Polish Armorial) by Kasper Niesiecki. He was also a founder and frequent exhibitor at the "Society of Friends of Fine Arts in Lwów" and served as Director of the Technical Academy (now Lviv Polytechnic).

Raczyński died in 1889 in Lwów. His works may be seen at the Lviv National Art Gallery and the King John III Palace Museum, Wilanów.

== Selected paintings ==
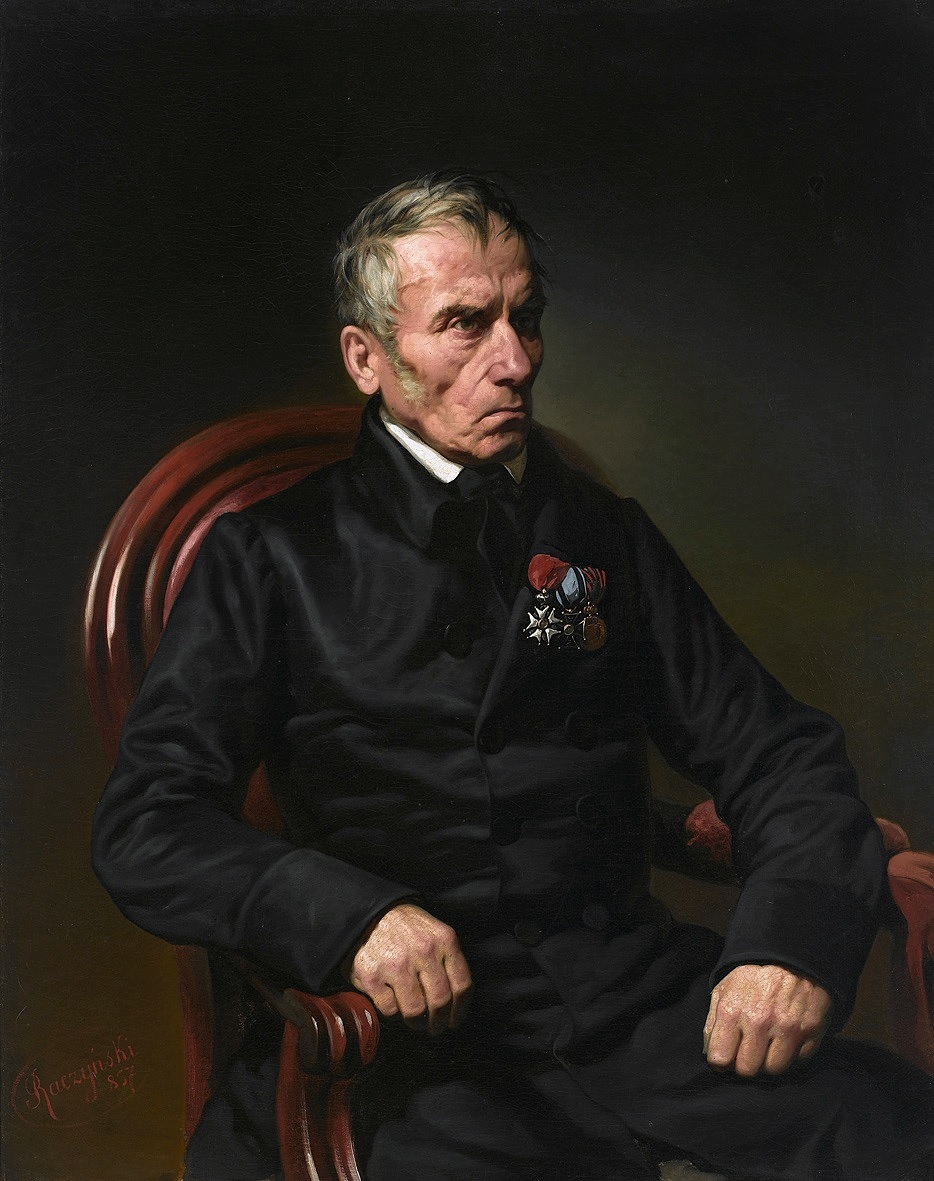
General Maciej Rybiński

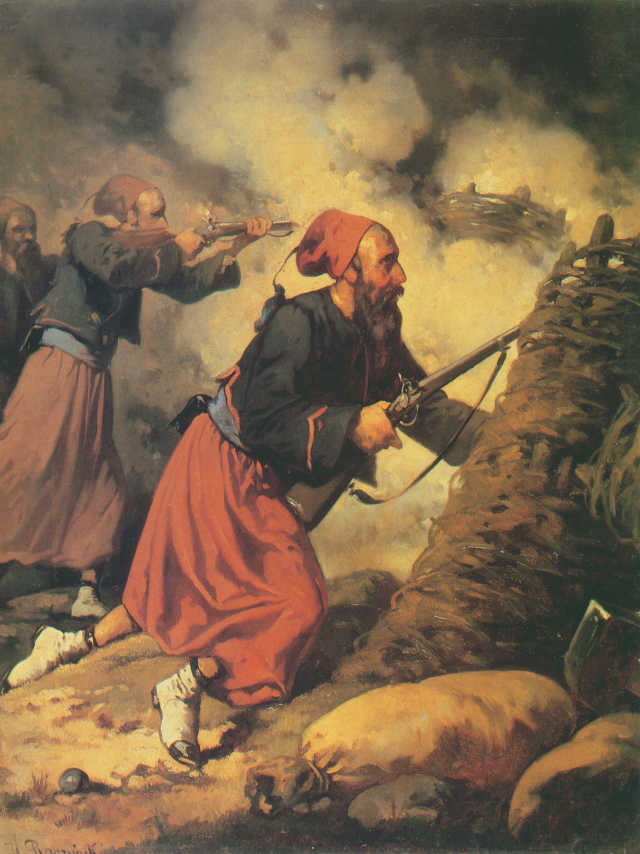
Zouaves in Battle (1858)

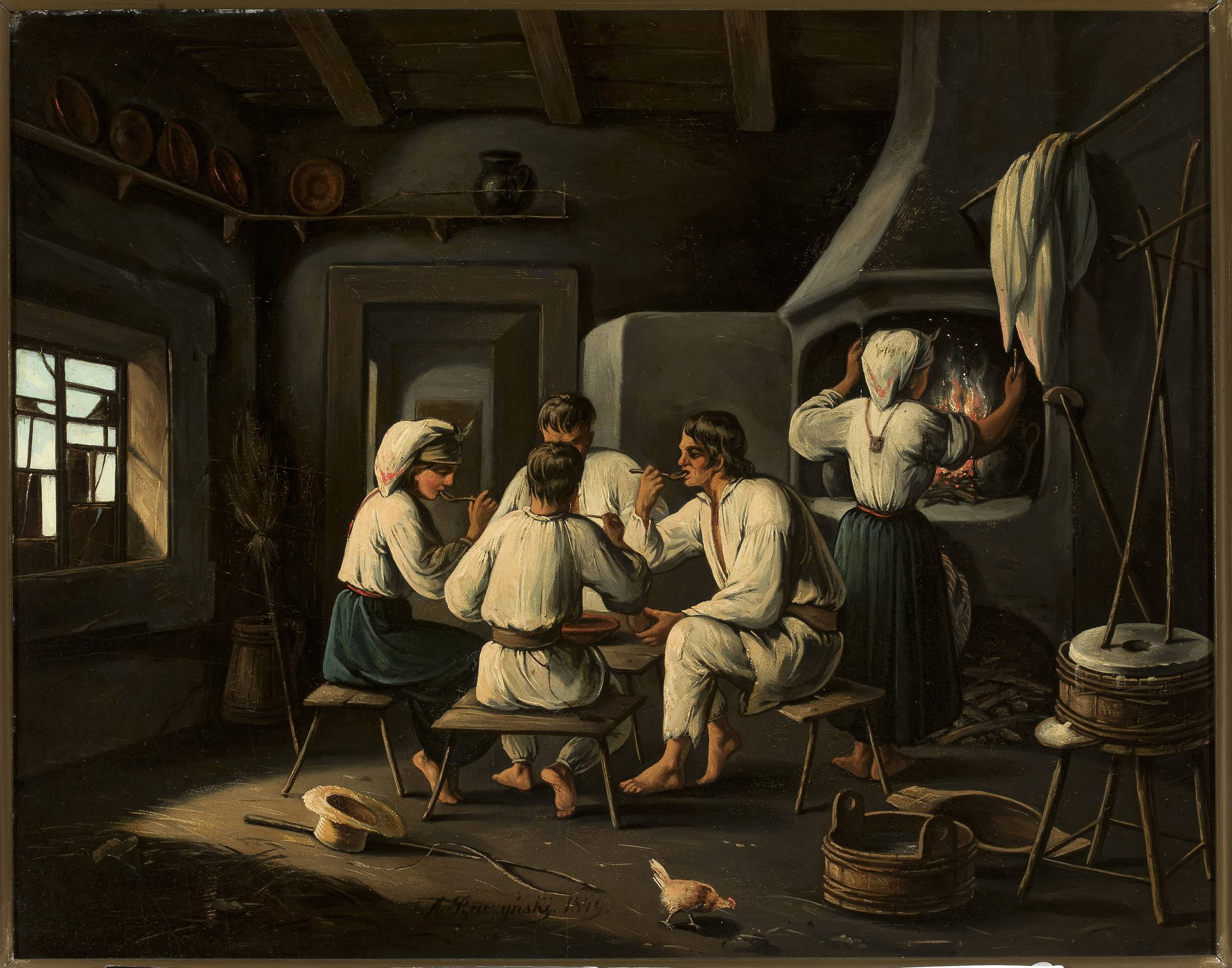
In the Servants' Chamber

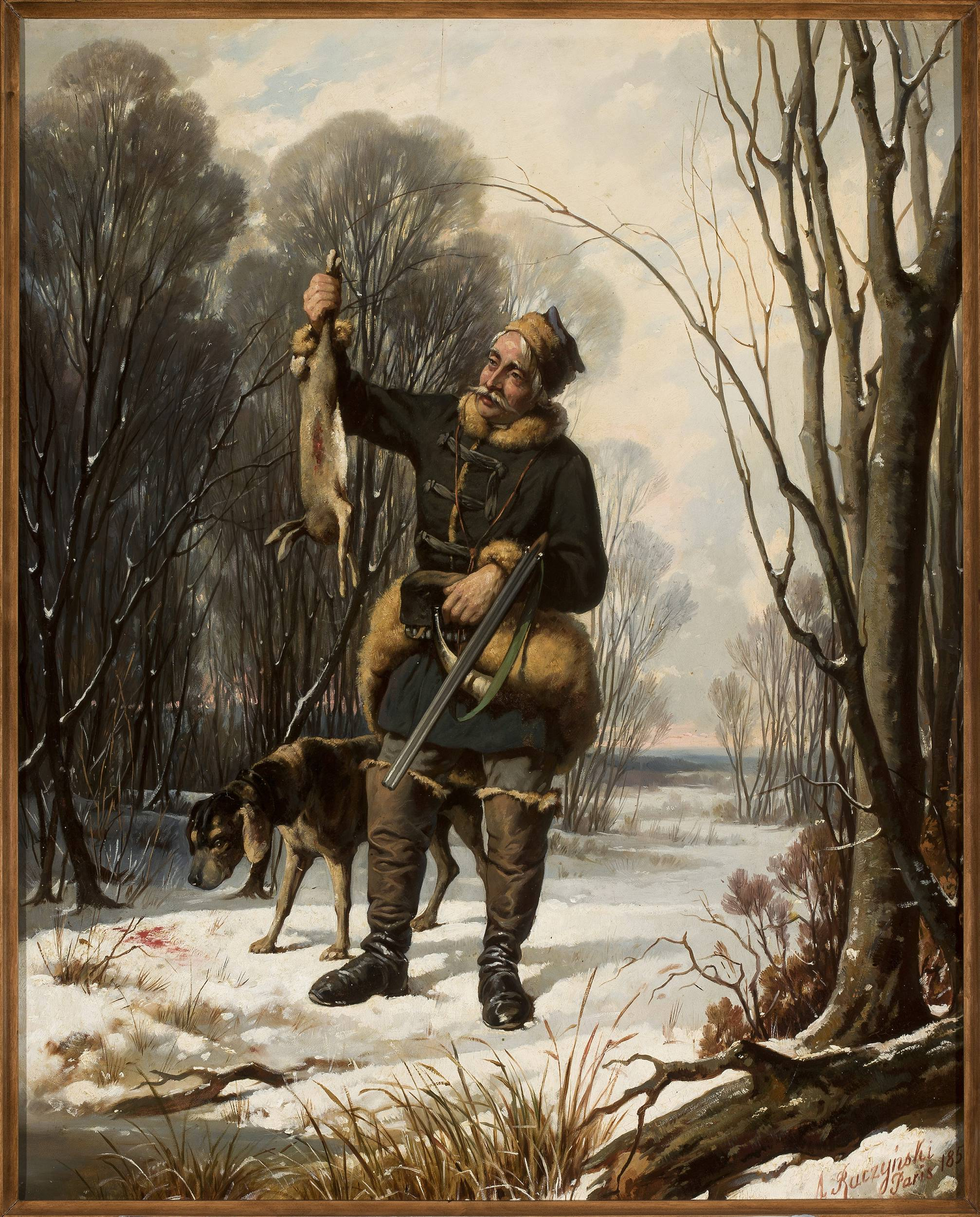
Hunter

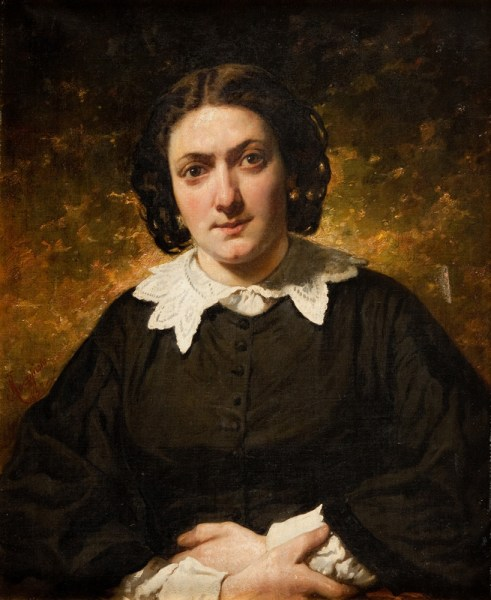
Portrait of a Woman (1857)
