= Kalisz Department =

Unit of administrative division in the Polish Duchy of Warsaw

Coordinates: 51°46′00″N 18°05′00″E

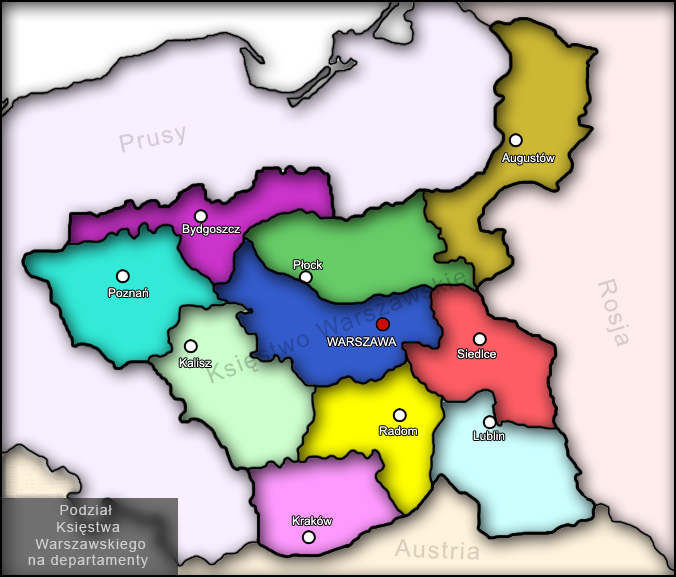
Administrative division of the Duchy of Warsaw, 1810–1815. Kalisz Department is light green in the south-west.

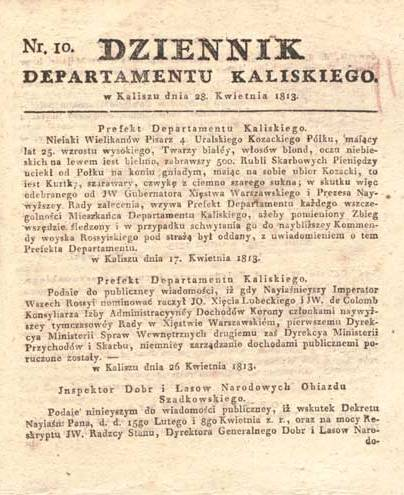
Dziennik Departamentu Kaliskiego, 1813

Kalisz Department (Polish: departament kaliski) was a unit of administrative division and local government in the Duchy of Warsaw from 1807 to 1815.

Its capital city was Kalisz, and the area was further subdivided onto 13 powiats.

In 1815, it was transformed into the Kalisz Voivodeship.
