= Maciej Rybiński =

Polish general and politician (1784–1874)

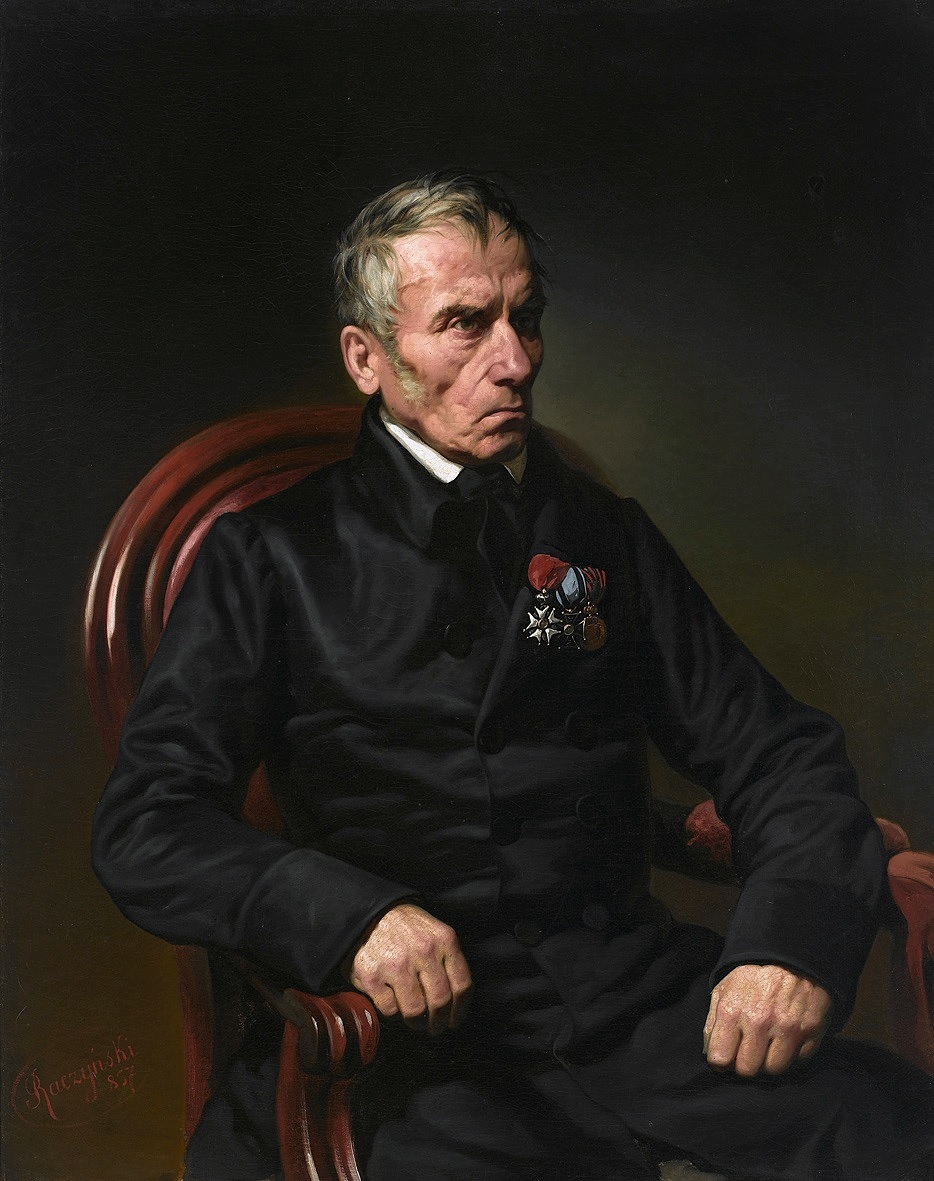
Portrait of Rybiński by Aleksander Raczyński

Maciej Rybiński (Polish pronunciation: [ˈmat͡ɕej rɨˈbiɲskʲi]; born 24 February 1784 in Slavuta in Wołyń, died 17 January 1874 in Paris) was a Polish general, who was the last chief of State of November Uprising. He was a successful artillery commander of the Napoleonic Wars commanding in Prince Piatkowski's VIII Corps of the Grandee Arme in Napoleon's invasion of Russia.
