= Sejm of the Duchy of Warsaw =

Parliament of the Duchy of Warsaw. It was created in 1807 by Napoleon

Sejm of the Duchy of Warsaw Sejm Księstwa Warszawskiego
- Duchy of Warsaw

Type
- Type: Bicameral
- Chambers: Senate; Chamber of Deputies

History
- Founded: 1807
- Disbanded: 1815
- Preceded by: Sejm of the Polish-Lithuanian Commonwealth
- Succeeded by: Sejm of Congress Poland

Leadership
- President of Senate: Tomasz Adam Ostrowski since 1811
- Marshal of the Sejm: Adam Kazimierz Czartoryski since 1812
- Seats: 106 (later 176): 100 (166) deputies; 6 (10) senators

Elections
- Senate voting system: Appointment
- Chamber of Deputies voting system: First past the post with limited suffrage

Meeting place
- Royal Castle, Warsaw

Sejm of the Duchy of Warsaw (Polish: Sejm Księstwa Warszawskiego) was the parliament of the Duchy of Warsaw. It was created in 1807 by Napoleon, who granted a new constitution to the recently created Duchy. It had limited competences, including having no legislative initiative. It met three times: for regular sessions in 1809 and 1811, and for an extraordinary session in 1812. In the history of Polish parliament, it succeeded the Sejm of the Polish-Lithuanian Commonwealth and was followed by the Sejm of the Congress Poland.

== History ==
In 1807 Napoleon created the Duchy of Warsaw and granted it a constitution. Like with all Napoleonic legislatures, it was inferior in political power to executive by design.

The Sejm had met three times: for regular sessions in 1809 and 1811, and for an extraordinary session of 1812. The Sejm was mainly occupied with administration and financial matters; its final act, in 1812, was to create the last Polish confederation, the General Confederation of the Kingdom of Poland.

== Composition and duration ==
The Sejm was composed of two chambers: a chamber of deputies and a senate. The chamber of deputies was composed of 100 deputies, in 1810 increased to 166. (Note: The revised numbers of deputies and senators are given for the period after the incorporation of Galicia following the Polish–Austrian War of 1809.) The initial 100 was composed of 60 deputies (after 1810, 100) elected from the ranks of the nobility (szlachta) during the sessions of the local parliaments (sejmiks), and 40 non-noble deputies (after 1810, 66), as well as members of the Council of State. The deputy candidates had to be 24 years or older, and government officials, priests or officers in active military service were not eligible for candidacy. They were elected for a nine-year term of office, in three tranches (elections for a third of the deputies were to be held every three years).

The senate was composed of bishops, voivodes and castellans; all nominated by the king. They numbered six each, in 1810 increased to ten each.

Those enfranchised to vote included landowners, owners of large businesses, clergy, artists, scientists, and the military. Notably, peasants could vote as well, provided they owned the land.The Sejm session lasted fifteen days, and was convened every two years.

Notable politicians of the Sejm of the Duchy of Warsaw included: Józef Godlewski, Tomasz A. Ostrowski, Stanisław Sołtyk, Stanisław Staszic, Wawrzyniec Surowiecki and Józef Wybicki.

== Competences ==
The competences of the Sejm of the Duchy of Warsaw were limited compared to its predecessor, the Sejm of the Polish-Lithuanian Commonwealth. It had no legislative initiative (that was limited to the executive, represented by the king and the Council of State), and could only accept or refuse (by simple majority) the legislation on the issues of treasury (finances and taxes) and civil and criminal law, presented to it by the executive. Further, discussions were limited, as only the members of the five-person strong committees (one for treasury and one for each of the two laws), elected in secret ballot and tasked with the analysis of the proposed legislation, and members of the Council of State, had the right to speak. In practice, the members of the Sejm found a way to overcome this limitation, as after the day session would be officially closed, the deputies would remain in the parliament and start a new discussion.

The senate was to supervise the chamber of deputies, ensuring it acts according to the constitution, and ensure the proper procedure during the elections. The senate could object to a legislation, but could be overruled by the king.

The king had the right to dissolve the chamber of deputies, or replace senators with new nominees.
