= Jan Paweł Lelewel =

Polish military and civil engineer, builder, and painter

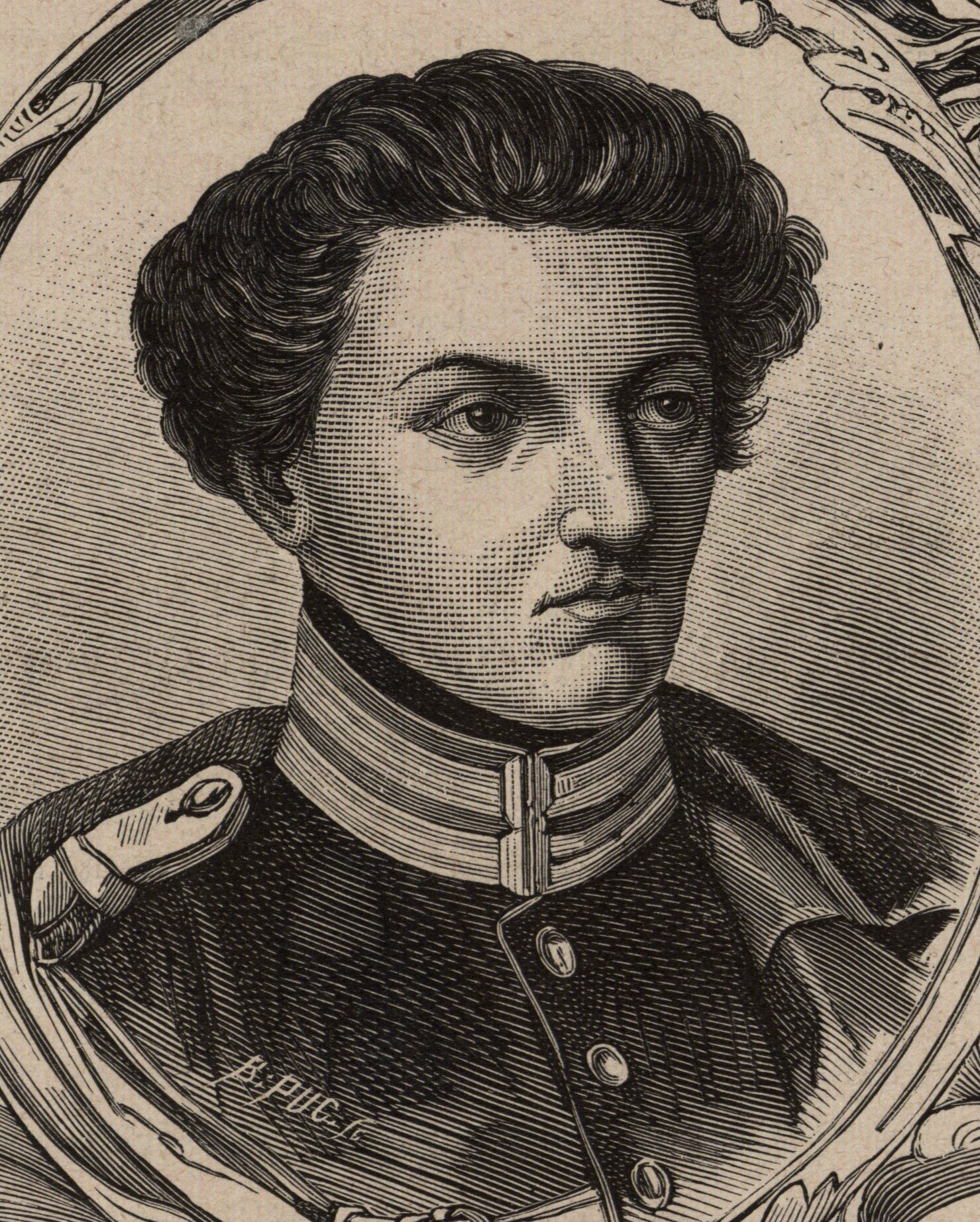
Jan Pawel Lelewel

Jan Paweł Lelewel (26 June 1796 in Warsaw – 9 April 1847 in Bern) was a Polish military and civil engineer, builder, and painter.

He was the brother of Joachim Lelewel, Polish historian and politician, and of Adam Prot Lelewel. They were all sons of Karol Maurycy Lelewel, secretary treasurer of the Commission of National Education and of Ewa Szeluta-Małynicka (1763-1837). His paternal grandfather had been the court doctor of August III, Henryk Loelhoeffel von Lowensprung.

From 1809, he attended the School for Cadets in Warsaw, after which he took part as a sergeant major in the 1812 invasion of Russia. In 1815, he became an officer in the Engineer Corp of the army of The Duchy of Warsaw. In 1823, he was responsible for the rebuilding works at Zamość Fortress. Subsequently, he took part in the building of Augustow Canal. He was given the Order of St. Vladimir, Fourth Class.

He took part in Polish November Uprising, in which he was in charge of maintaining fortifications in Praga, then a suburb of Warsaw. He began his military duty as a captain and ended it as a lieutenant colonel. After the defeat of the insurrection, he left the country for France.

== Bibliography ==
- A. Czolowskic: Zapomniany fortyfikator Zamościa. Teka zamoj. R. l (5): 1938 nr 3 s. 153 nn. Inż. Jan Paweł Lelewel;
- Jacek Feduszka: Jan Paweł Lelewel (1796-1847), in: Zamojski Kwartalnik Kulturalny nr 3-4/1999 s.77-84 2000;
- Lelewel, Prot und Joachim Lelewel: Żywot Jana Pawla Lelewela, podpułkownika i inżyniera, Posen 1857;
- Orłowski, Bolesław (red.): Słownik polskich pionierów techniki, Katowice 1984, s. 118-119;
- Polski Słownik Biograficzny, Band XVII, S. 19;
- Przegon, Wojciech: Jan Paweł Lelewels Generalplan zum Projekt der Trockenlegung der Sumpfgebiete des Seelandes (1834). Vermessung Photogrammetrie Kulturtechnik. Schweiz, 8, 1999, S. 432-434;
- Przegon, Wojciech: Krajobrazy XIX-wiecznego Zamościa w akwarelach i rysunkach Jana Pawła Lelewela. Krakau 1997;
- Przegon, Wojciech: Jan Paweł Lelewel - inżynier wojskowy. Biuletyn Regionalny Zakladu Doradztwa Rolniczego Akademii Rolniczej w Krakowie 2001;
- Zieliński, Jan: Nasza Szwajcaria. Przewodnik śladami Polaków, Warszawa 1999, s. 24-25, 141;
