= Wincenty Niemojowski =

Polish political activist

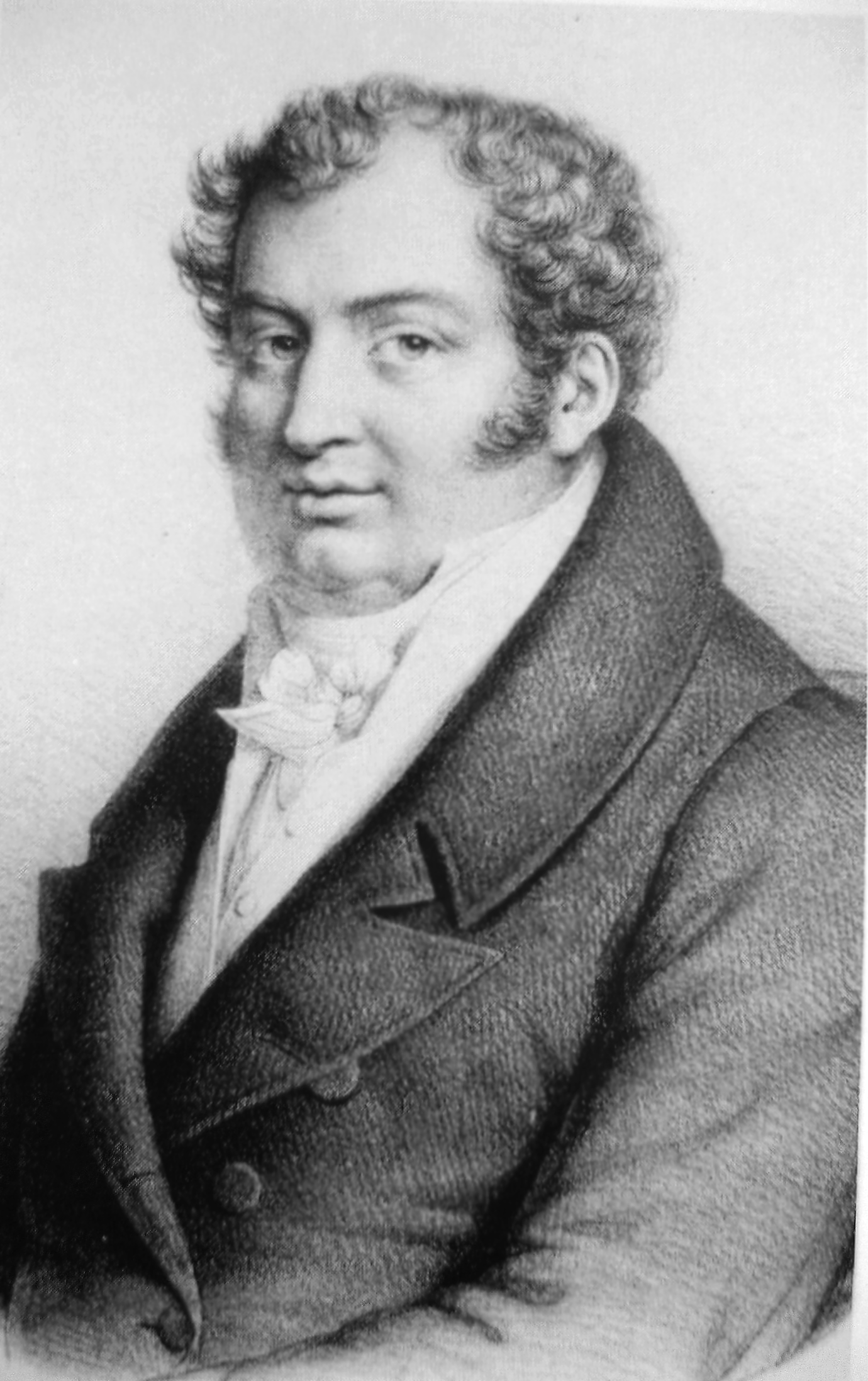
Wincenty Niemojowski

Wincenty Niemojowski (1784–1834) was a Polish political activist in Congress Poland. Member of the Kalisz Opposition, later joined the revolutionary government during the November Uprising.

== See also ==
- Bonawentura Niemojowski
