= Polish National Government (November Uprising) =

1831 rebel government

Kingdom of Poland Królestwo Polskie (Polish)
- 1831
- Flag Coat of arms
- Motto: Polish: Za wolność naszą i waszą (For our freedom and yours)
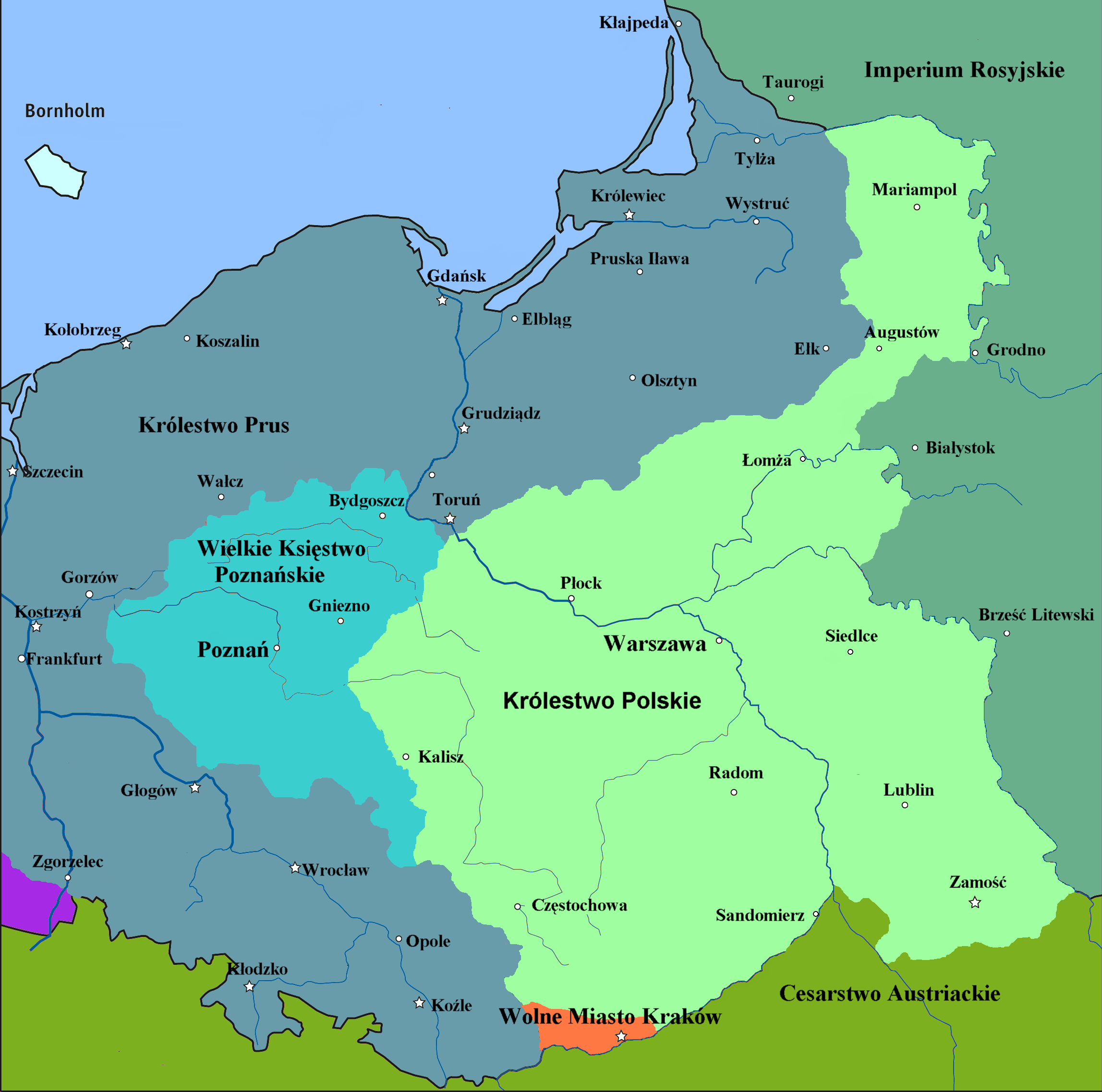
- Congress Poland (in light green), 1815
- Capital: Warsaw
- Common languages: Polish; Ruthenian; Lithuanian
- Religion: Roman Catholic
- Government: Republic
- Dictator of the Uprising
- President
  - 30 January – 17 August 1831: Adam Jerzy Czartoryski
  - 17 August – 7 September 1831: Jan Krukowiecki
  - 7–25 September 1831: Bonawentura Niemojowski
  - 25 September – 9 October 1831: Maciej Rybiński^{[a]}
- Legislature: Sejm
- History
  - Establishment of National Government after November Uprising: 29 January 1831
  - Suppressed: 5 October 1831
Preceded by	Succeeded by
Congress Poland	Congress Poland
- a: Maciej Rybiński was not a president per se, but a legal successor.

Polish National Government of 1831 was a Polish supreme authority during the November Uprising against the Partitions of Poland that dissolved the Polish–Lithuanian Commonwealth. It was formed by the decree of the Sejm (parliament) of the Congress Poland on 29 January 1831 to assume the competences of the Polish head of state in the follow-up of an earlier decree of 25 January: deposing the Tsar Nicholas I of Russia from the throne of Poland.

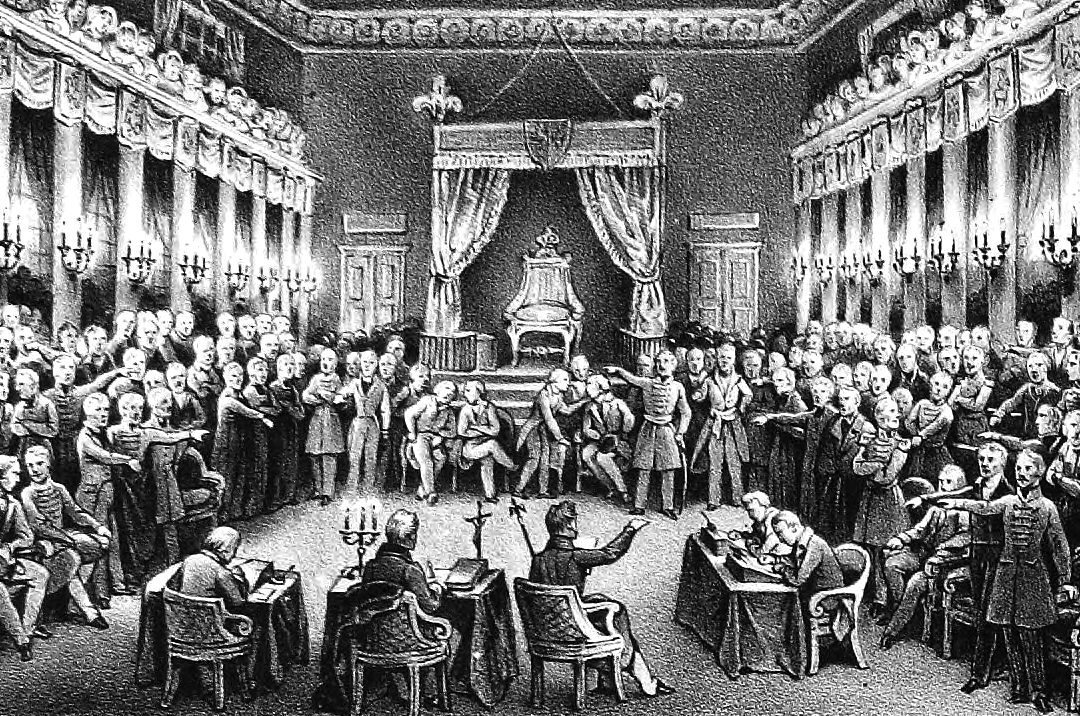
Legal dethronisation of Russian Tsar Nicholas I on Polish soil by the National Government, 1831

The government concentrated on issues related to the fight against the Russian Empire. In August 1831, the government of Prince Adam Jerzy Czartoryski resigned, facing loss of support and radicalization among the Varsovians. Czartoryski was replaced by Jan Krukowiecki. After the capitulation of Warsaw, the government was taken over by lawyer Bonawentura Niemojowski. After the government went into exile, it passed its powers to General Maciej Rybiński.

== Presidents ==
- Prince Adam Czartoryski 30 January – 17 August 1831, head of the Department of Foreign Affairs
- Jan Krukowiecki 17 August – 7 September 1831
- Bonawentura Niemojowski 7–25 September 1831 (left the country with archives, refusing to capitulate)
- General Maciej Rybiński 25 September – 9 October 1831 (not a president per se, but a legal successor)

== Others ==
- Leon Dembowski
- Joachim Lelewel, head of the Department of Religion, Education and Justice
- Franciszek Morawski
- Wincenty Niemojowski, head of the Department of Administration and Police
