= Kalisz Voivodeship (1816–1837) =

Former subdivision of the Congress Poland

- Voivodeship of Congress Poland and the Polish-Lithuanian-Ruthenian Commonwealth
- Coat of arms

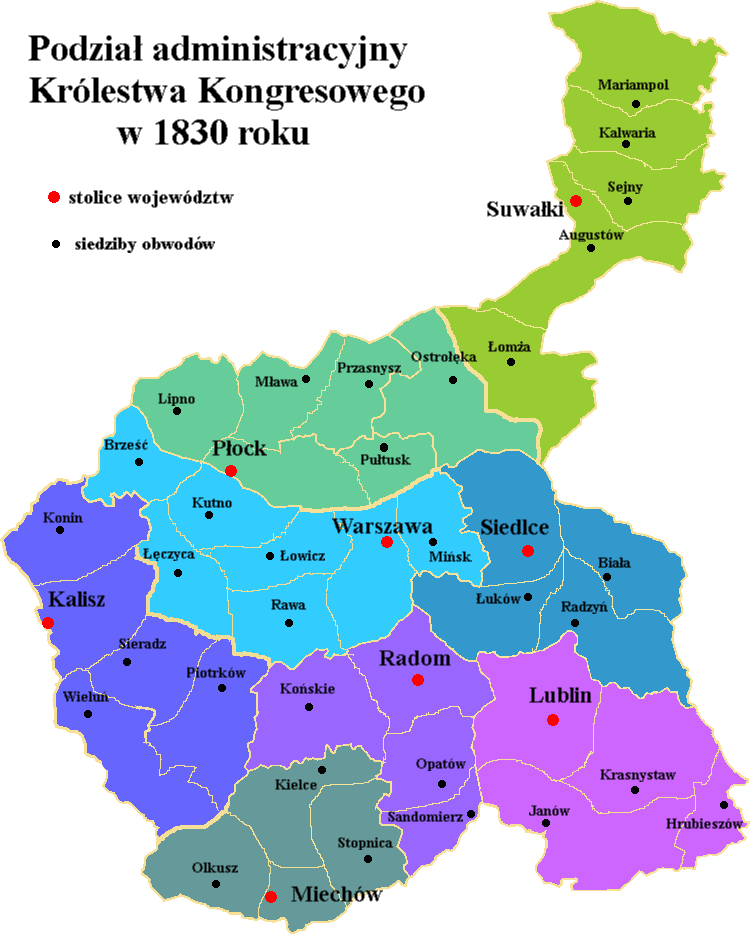
- The administrative subdivisions of the Congress Poland in 1830, including the Kalisz Voivodeship.
- Capital: Kalisz
- History
  - Establishment: 16 January 1816
  - Replacement by the Kalisz Governorate: 23 February 1837
  - Reestablishment during the January Uprising: 1863
  - Abolishment by the Russian Empire: 1864
- Contained within
  - Country: Congress Poland (1816–1837); Polish-Lithuanian-Ruthenian Commonwealth (1863–1834)
Preceded by	Succeeded by
Kalisz Department; Warsaw Governorate	Kalisz Governorate; Warsaw Governorate

The Kalisz Voivodeship (Note: Polish: Województwo kaliskie) was a voivodeship of the Congress Poland, that existed from 1816 to 1837. Its capital was Kalisz. It was established on 16 January 1816, from Kalisz Department, and existed until 23 February 1837, when it was replaced by Kalisz Governorate. During the January Uprising, the Polish National Government, announced the re-establishment of the voivodeships with the borders from 1816, reestablishing the administration of the Kalisz Voivodeship within the part of Warsaw Governorate. It existed from 1863 to 1864, when it was abolished, and replaced by the Warsaw Governorate.

== Subdivisions ==
- Kalisz District
  - Kalisz County
  - Warta County
- Konin District
  - Konin County
  - Pyzdry County
- Sieradz District
  - Sieradz County
  - Szadek County
- Wieluń District
  - Częstochowa County
  - Ostrzeszów County
  - Wieluń County
- Piotrków District
  - Piotrków County
  - Radom County
