= Józef Chłopicki =

Polish military general (1771–1854)

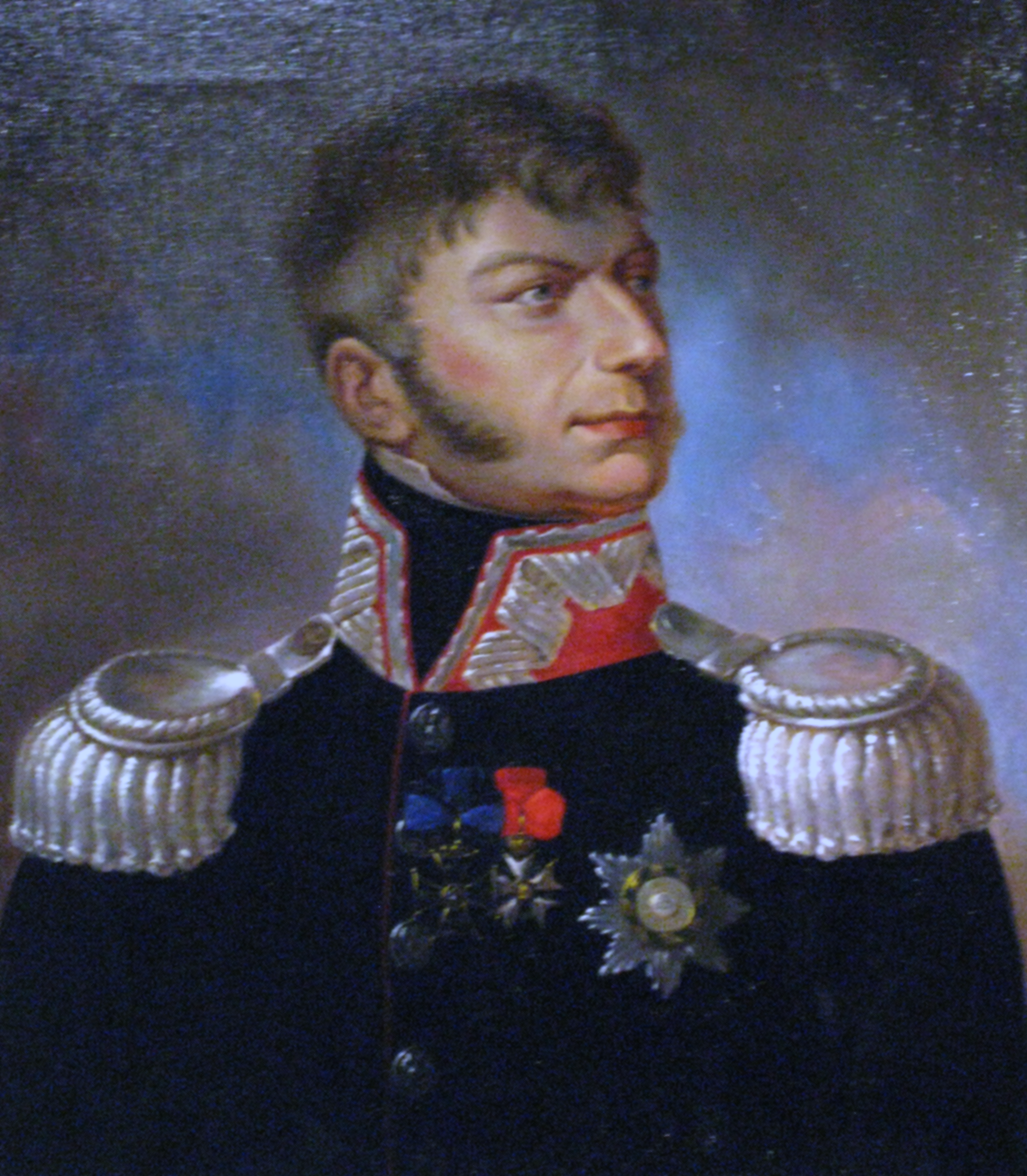
- Chłopicki before 1854
- Born: Józef Grzegorz Chłopicki; 14 March 1771; Kapustynie, Volhynia, Kingdom of Poland
- Died: 30 September 1854 (aged 83); Kraków, Austrian Empire
- Burial place: Olszynka Grochowska, Warsaw, Poland
- Military career
- Allegiance: Kingdom of Poland, Kingdom of France
- Branch: Polish Legions; Vistula Legion; Grande Armée; Army of the Duchy of Warsaw; Army of Congress Poland
- Service years: 1785–1831 (Note: Despite his resignation, Chłopicki continued to fight as a private soldier until his retirement.)
- Rank: General of division
- Conflicts: Polish–Russian War of 1792; Battle of Zieleńce; Kościuszko Uprising (1794); Battle of Racławice; Polish Legions and campaigns in Italy; Battle of Novi; Battle of the Trebbia; War of the Fourth Coalition; Battle of Eylau; Battle of Friedland; Peninsular War; Battle of Tudela; Battle of Alcañiz; Battle of María; Battle of Belchite; Siege of Tortosa; Battle of Saguntum; French invasion of Russia; Battle of Smolensk; Battle of Borodino; November Uprising (1830–1831); Battle of Olszynka Grochowska
- Awards: Legion of Honour

Dictator of the Polish National Government (Acting)
- In office December 5, 1830 – January 17, 1831
- Monarch: Nicholas I
- Preceded by: Adam Jerzy Czartoryski
- Succeeded by: Jan Krukowiecki

Józef Grzegorz Chłopicki (Polish pronunciation: [ˈjuzɛf xwɔˈpit͡skʲi]; 14 March 1771 – 30 September 1854) was a Polish military general who led the Polish Armed Forces, and fought in Europe during the Napoleonic era alongside later years. During his service, he was chosen and served as the dictator of the Polish National Government from December 1830 until his resignation in January 1831.

Chłopicki was born in Volhynia. In 1785, he ran away from his home in order to enlist as a volunteer in the Polish army. After entering the army, he fought under military leader Tadeusz Kościuszko in the Uprising of 1794. After Warsaw was surrendered to the Russians in November 1794, Chlopicki went to the Kingdom of France and joined the Army of the Cisalpine Republic under General Jan Henryk Dąbrowski.

During the November Uprising, Chłopicki became the leader of the Polish insurrection in December 1830. Rather then pursuing a prolonged war, he began a negotiated settlement with Nicholas I of Russia but resigned in January 1831 after negotiations failed. He later participated in several other battles, including the Battle of Olszynka Grochowska where he was seriously wounded which forced him into retirement. He spent his final years retired in Kraków, Poland, where he died in September 1854.

== Early life and enlistment ==
Józef Grzegorz Chłopicki was born in Kapustynie, Volhynia, in the Kingdom of Poland on 14 March 1771. His father, Franciszek Chłopicki, held the office as cupbearer of Bracław, while his mother was Marianna Lenkiewicz. His older brother, Andrzej Chłopicki, was a monk who fought in the Bar Confederation. His family belonged to Polish nobility and bore the Nieczuja coat of arms.

Chłopicki was educated at the school of the Basilians at Szarogrod, but showed very little interest. After his brother helped him develop interest in military history, he ran away in 1785 in order to enlist in the Polish army.

== Service ==
=== Early years ===
An early portrait of Chłopicki

Chłopicki was present at all the engagements fought during 1792 to 1794, especially distinguishing himself at the Battle of Racławice, when he was General Franciszek Rymkiewicz's adjutant. On the formation of the Italian legion, Chłopicki joined the second battalion as major, and was publicly complimented by General Nicolas Oudinot for his extraordinary valour at the storming of Peschiera. He also distinguished himself at the battles of Modena, Busano, Casablanca and Ponto.

=== Napoleonic wars (1807−1813) ===
In 1807, Chłopicki became a colonel and commander of the 1st Infantry Regiment of the Vistula Legion, a Polish formation serving under Napoleon. He served during the War of the Fourth Coalition, including the battles of Eylau and Friedland. The remaining infantry and cavalry regiments who had continued in French service in Italy were reorganized in Silesia into a Polish-Italian Legion (PolaccoItalienne). In Spain, Chłopicki obtained the Legion of Honour and the rank of a French Imperial Baron for his heroism at the battle of Epila and the storming of Zaragoza, and in 1809 was promoted to be general of brigade.

Chłopicki was involved in battles from 1806 to 1812, including his involvement in the Peninsular War from 1808 to 1811, commanding Polish troops at the Battle of Épila. He continued fighting in Spain until 1812, where he followed Napoleon to Russia and fighting at Smolensk and on the Moscow. At Smolensk he was seriously wounded, and on the reconstruction of the Polish army in 1813 was made a general of division.

=== Return to Poland ===
Chłopicki returned to Polish service under the rule of Alexander I of Russia, who became king of the Congress Poland. Chłopicki received the rank of general of division in May 1814, and as such was able to command the 1st Infantry Division. However, due to an insult made from Grand Duke Konstantin Pavlovich, it resulted in him retiring in October 1818.

=== November Uprising ===
Chłopicki crossing the Wisła river, 1831

After the November Uprising broke out, members of several officer cadets and academics began searching for a leader to lead the Polish insurrection. Chłopicki initially declined to join the insurgents, but eventually agreed to become the dictator of the Polish insurrection on December 5, 1830.

Following his agreement, Chłopicki began a negotiated settlement with Nicholas I of Russia, as an attempt to further tie strengths between Poland and Russia. After negotiations failed with Russia however, Chłopicki resigned on 17 January 1831. Chłopicki's resignation did not end his military involvement in the uprising though, as he joined the Polish army as a private soldier and fought in various battles, and Jan Krukowiecki was named as his successor.

== Retirement and death ==
The grave of Chłopicki, located in Olszynka Grochowska

Chłopicki took part in fighting near Wawer, and was subsequently appointed to command troops on the front line. At the Battle of Olszynka Grochowska on 20 February 1831, while Chłopicki was fighting, he became seriously wounded which led to him getting escorted to Kraków. From there, he lived in retirement until his death in 1854. He was 83.
