= UAB Lelija =

- Founded: 1947; 79 years ago
- Headquarters: Lithuania
- Number of employees: 414

UAB Lelija is the biggest garment manufacturer in Lithuania, producing annually around 1.5 million outerwear textile clothing. "Lelija" was established in 1947. 414 employees currently work with the company.

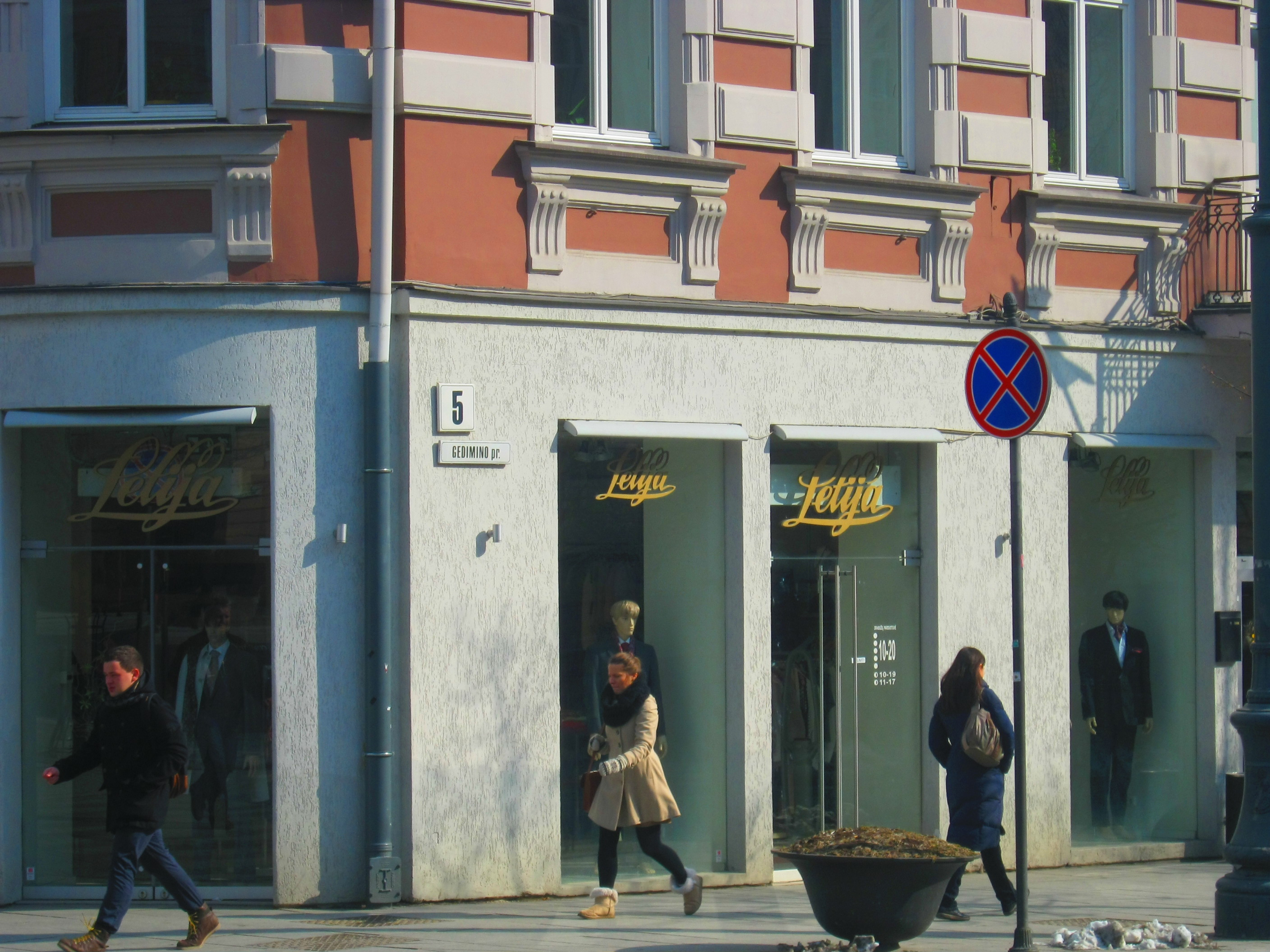
The Lelija Store in Gediminas Avenue, Vilnius

Main enterprise is located in Paneriai (Vilnius), the capital of Lithuania, where are samples making, CAD (designing), CAM (cutting) departments and nine specialized sewing workshops. The Company has six affiliates in other cities in Lithuania. In 2011, it owed 832,500 litas (241,000 euros) to the state alone.
