= Józefat Ignacy Łukasiewicz =

Lithuanian painter

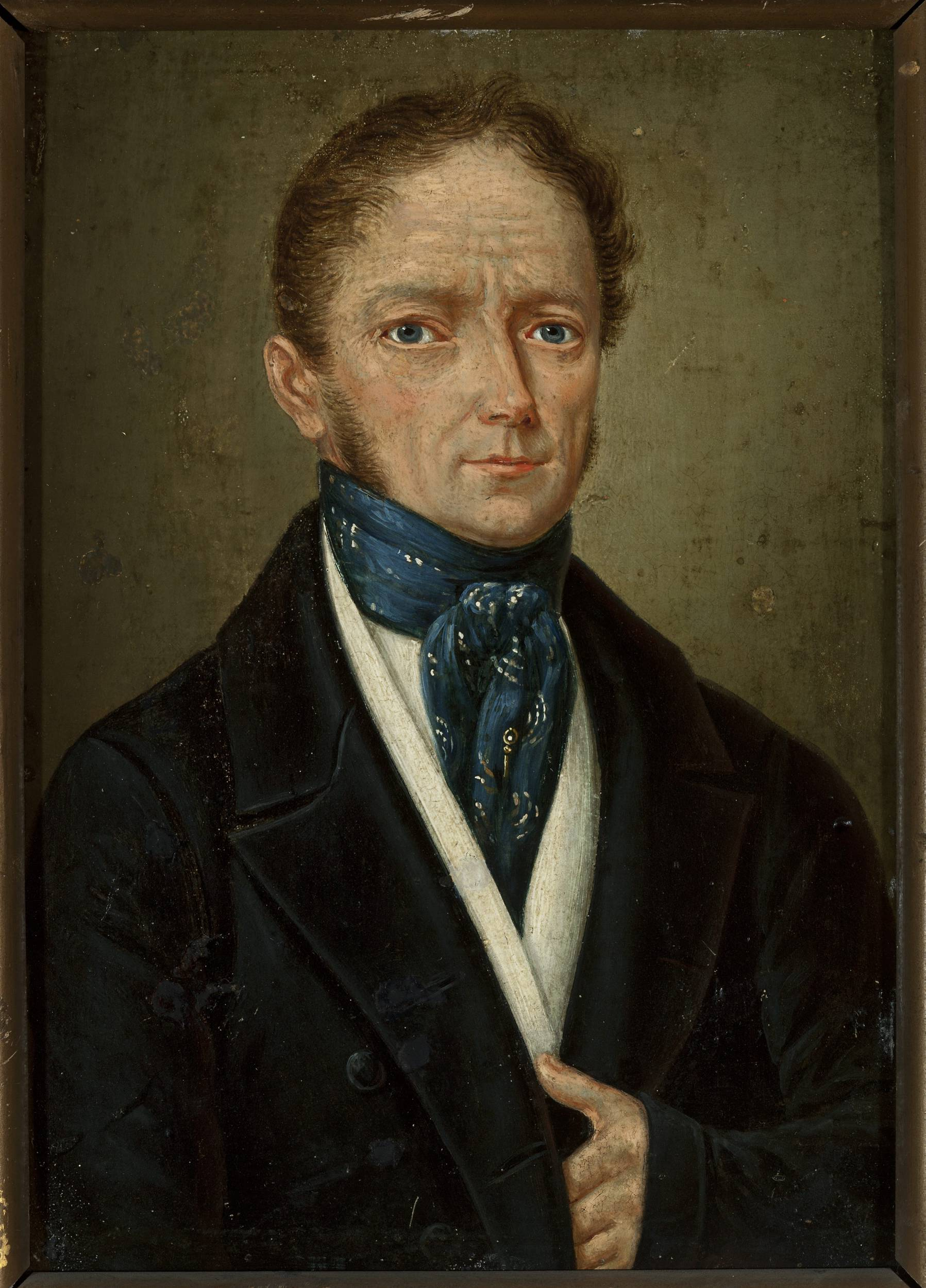
Józefat Ignacy Łukasiewicz

Józefat Ignacy Łukaszewicz (Lithuanian: Juozapas Ignotas Lukaševičius; 6 November 1789 – 3 January 1850) was a Polish-Lithuanian painter.

== Early life ==
He was born in Žiežmariai on 6 November 1789 as son of Teodor Jozef Łukaszewicz (1747–1805), noble and owner of the village council and administrator of several towns in the property of Władysław Franciszek Jabłonowski in Czeszewo, and Katarzyna Zofia Marianna Łukaszewicz born Baranowska (1765–1843). He was brother of Józef Łukaszewicz (1799–1873), historian, publicist, librarian and publisher. When he was young, Józefat initially was a student of the Dominican Order in Vilnius.

== Napoleonic Wars ==
In 1812, Łukaszewicz enrolled in the Vilnius University and began studying in its art school, where he studied painting as a pupil of Jan Rustem. When the French invasion of the Russian Empire began in summer 1812 and the Grand Armée liberated Vilnius, Łukaszewicz joined Napoleon's Imperial Guard and was an uhlan of the 3rd Lithuanian Guard Lancer Regiment. Its commanding officer, General Jan Konopka, and some of the regiment's soldiers were taken prisoner at the battle of Slonim in 1812. Together with the Grand Armée's remnants, the soldiers from the broken regiment, including Józefat Łukaszewicz, retreated to the Kingdom of Saxony. Łukaszewicz was wounded in the Battle of Leipzig, in late October 1813. Thereafter, he was released from the army due to his weak health and he went to Warsaw. The sick Józefat was cared for by an uncle Jan Baranowski, who lived in Warsaw, a well-known violin maker and manufacturer of musical instruments. He lived there until his death since 1813.

== Life in Warsaw ==
When he came to Warsaw in 1813, Łukaszewicz continued his studies in painting with Józef Kosiński, whose collaborator he was until 1818. In 1817–1818, he studied at the Department of Fine Arts at University of Warsaw under the supervision of Antoni Brodowski and Antoni Blank. At the Warsaw Exhibitions of Fine Arts in the years 1819, 1821 and 1825, Józefat Łukaszewicz exhibited his paintings. In 1819, he received a gold medal for three paintings exhibited at the Warsaw Art Exhibition. After the exhibition, he became the court painter of Grand Duke Konstantin Pavlovich of Russia until 1830. Many of Łukaszewicz's paintings decorated Konstantin's palaces in Warsaw and Saint Petersburg. In 1825 Łukaszewicz was awarded together with Frédéric Chopin by Tsar Alexander I of Russia with a diamond ring.

Despite living in Warsaw, he did not cut ties with his homeland until his death, is evidenced by his work "The Cross and Luke the Evangelist", stored in the Art Museum of Vilnius, on which the artist's handwriting states that it was painted on 17 February 1820 in Darsūniškis. In addition, Łukaszewicz signed that painting as "Ignatius Lukaszewicz".

He died in Warsaw on 3 January 1850 and was buried in Powązki Cemetery.

== Artworks ==
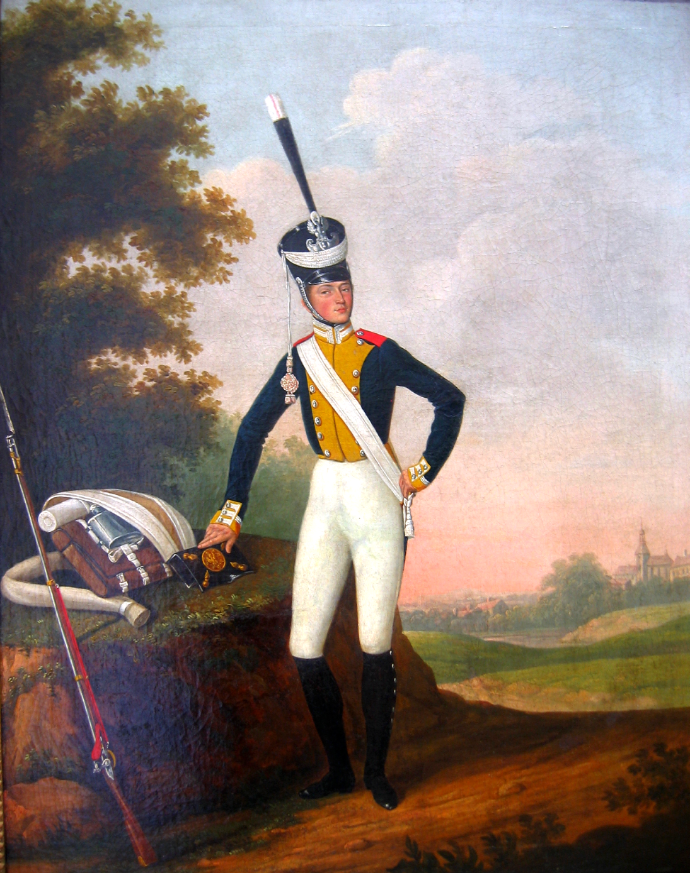
Congress Poland Infantryman

Łukaszewicz created mostly military art and painted more than a hundred paintings depicting the Army of Congress Poland in Warsaw. Nevertheless, he painted also religious and landscape paintings, portraits and portrait miniatures, as well as copies of Western European masters. His painting style was that of academism, characterized by careful modeling of details.

In his works, the confusion of the battle is shown through the whirlwind of men and horses, the individual actions and the bloody consequences for the participants. Łukaszewicz relied on all of his dramatic skills and compositional devices to create thrilling scenes in dramatic and dynamic landscapes that participate emotionally in the scene represented.

His works are in numerous churches and museums, including the Lviv National Museum, Polish Army Museum, National Museum, Warsaw, National Museum, Szczecin, Belweder and Russian Museum in Saint Petersburg.

== Works ==
- Portrait of Aleksander Skawiński. Oil on canvas. Lublin Museum
- Equestrian portrait of Piotr Szembek, Oil on canvas, 1832
- Portrait of Grand Duke Konstantin Pavlovich of Russia, Watercolor on paper, ca.1830
- Portrait miniature of Baroness de Sassè (fiancée of the “aide de camp” of the Count Ivan Paskevich d’Erivan the Lieutenant General Friedrich Wilhelm Rembert von Berg), watercolor on ivory, 1824
- Equestrian portrait of Joanna Grudzińska, oil on canvas

== Sources ==
- Dobrovolskaitė, Irena (2017). "Juozapas Ignotas Lukaševičius". vle.lt (in Lithuanian). Archived from the original on 12 September 2022.
- Dobska, Elżbieta (2016). "Gdy mój prapradziadek był szwoleżerem". Parantele: Rocznik Śląskiego Towarzystwa Genealogicznego we Wrocławiu (in Polish). 1.
- Jankuvienė, Audronė (2009). Kas yra kas Lietuvoje. Kraštiečiai (in Lithuanian). Vol. Kaišiadorys. Kaunas: UAB „Neolitas“. pp. 102–103. ISBN 9789986709657.
