= Johanna Juliana Friederike Bacciarelli =

German miniaturist, pastelist and court painter

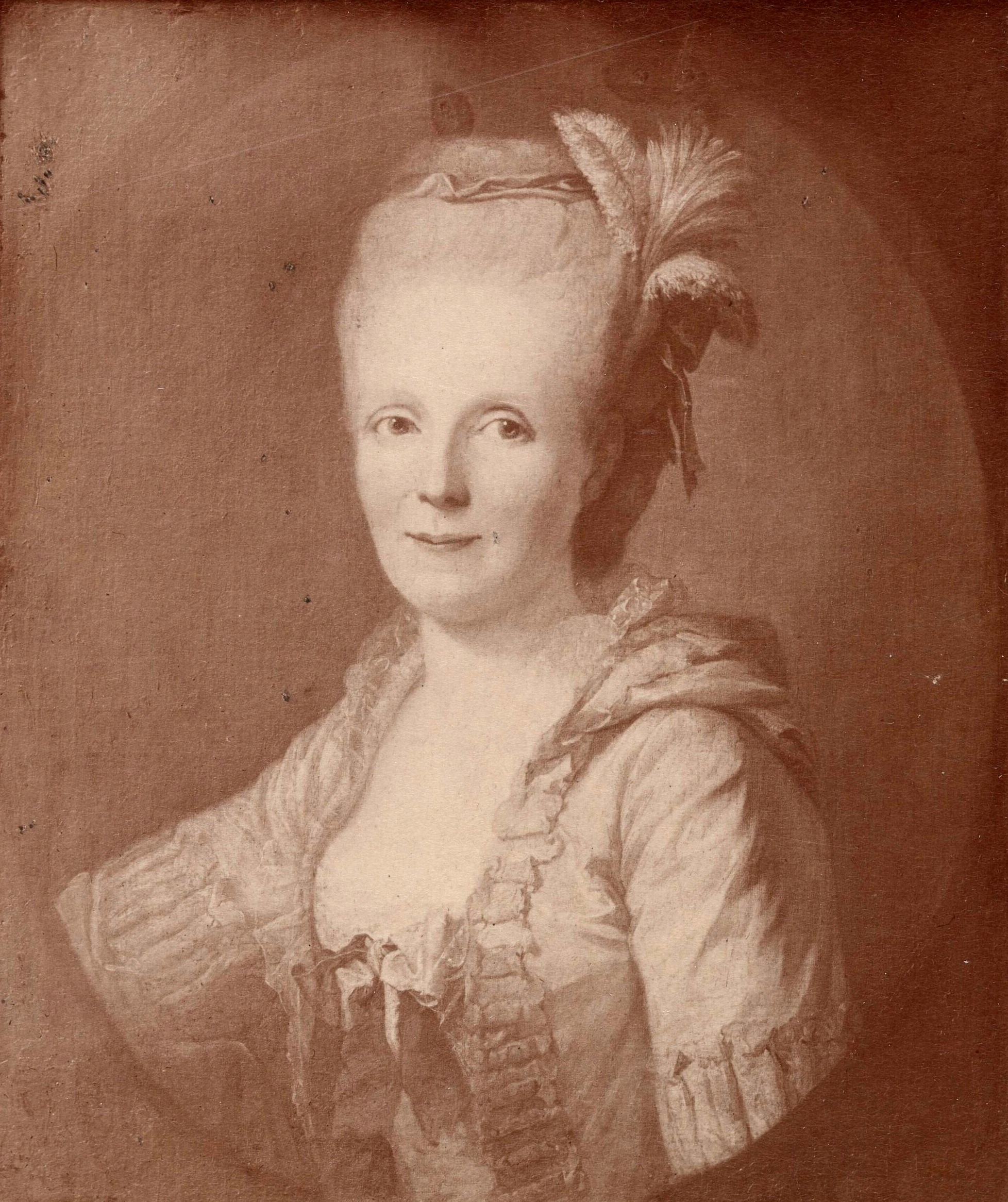
- Portrait of Bacciarelli
- Born: 21 May 1733; Dresden, Electorate of Saxony
- Died: 1809, 1811 or 1812; Warsaw, Duchy of Warsaw
- Known for: Painting

Johanna Juliana Friederike Bacciarelli, née Richter (21 May 1733 – 1809 or later), was a German miniaturist, pastelist and court painter to the Polish kings.

== Early life and education ==
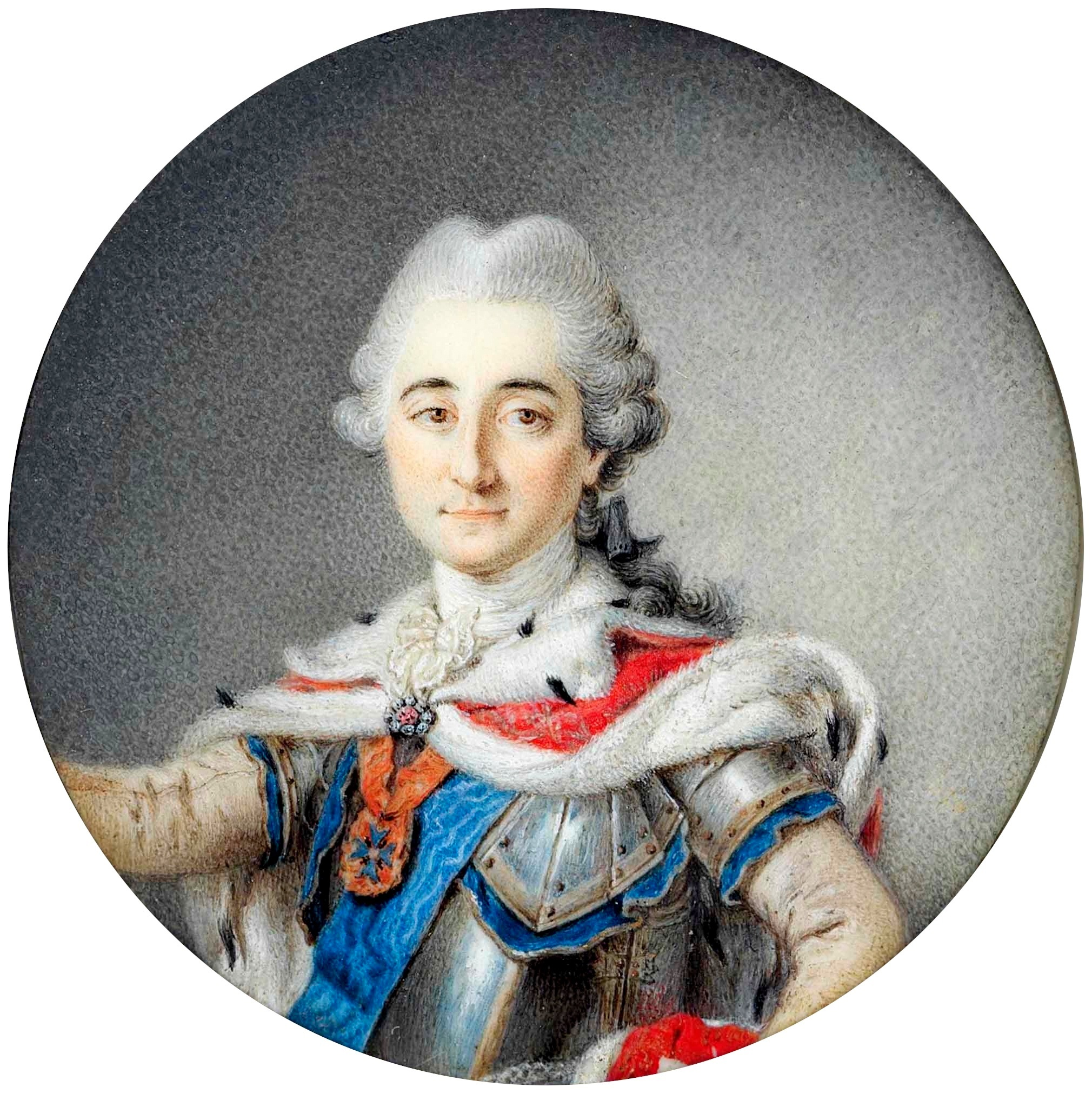
Stanisław August Poniatowski, circle of Bacciarelli

Johanna was born on 21 May, 1733 in Dresden, in the artistic Richter family. She studied painting with Charles Hutin and Marcello Bacciarelli.

== Career ==
In 1753, she began working at the Dresden court and two years later married Bacciarelli. She spent the years 1756–1764 in Warsaw, and on 8 December 1759, she received the title of court painter of Augustus III of Poland. In 1764, she received the title of académicienne agregée at the Dresden Academy of Fine Arts, later becoming its honorary member. She spent the years 1764–1766 in Vienna, where she created miniature copies of paintings for Elżbieta Grabowska, then she returned with her husband to Warsaw.

Johanna created miniatures, medallions and pastels. She mainly portrayed nobility and kings, including Stanisław August Poniatowski, painting portrait miniatures on ivory, which was unusual in Poland at the time. Like Hutin, she used the technique of dry pointillism, limiting the use of pigments. She taught many artists who went on to create the Warsaw school of miniature: Wincenty de Lesseur, Józef Kosiński, Franciszek Olexiński and Stanisław Marszałkiewicz. As she rarely signed her works, most of the works were attributed to her according to tradition.

Works attributed to Bacciarelli and her workshop can be found in the collection of the National Museum in Warsaw.

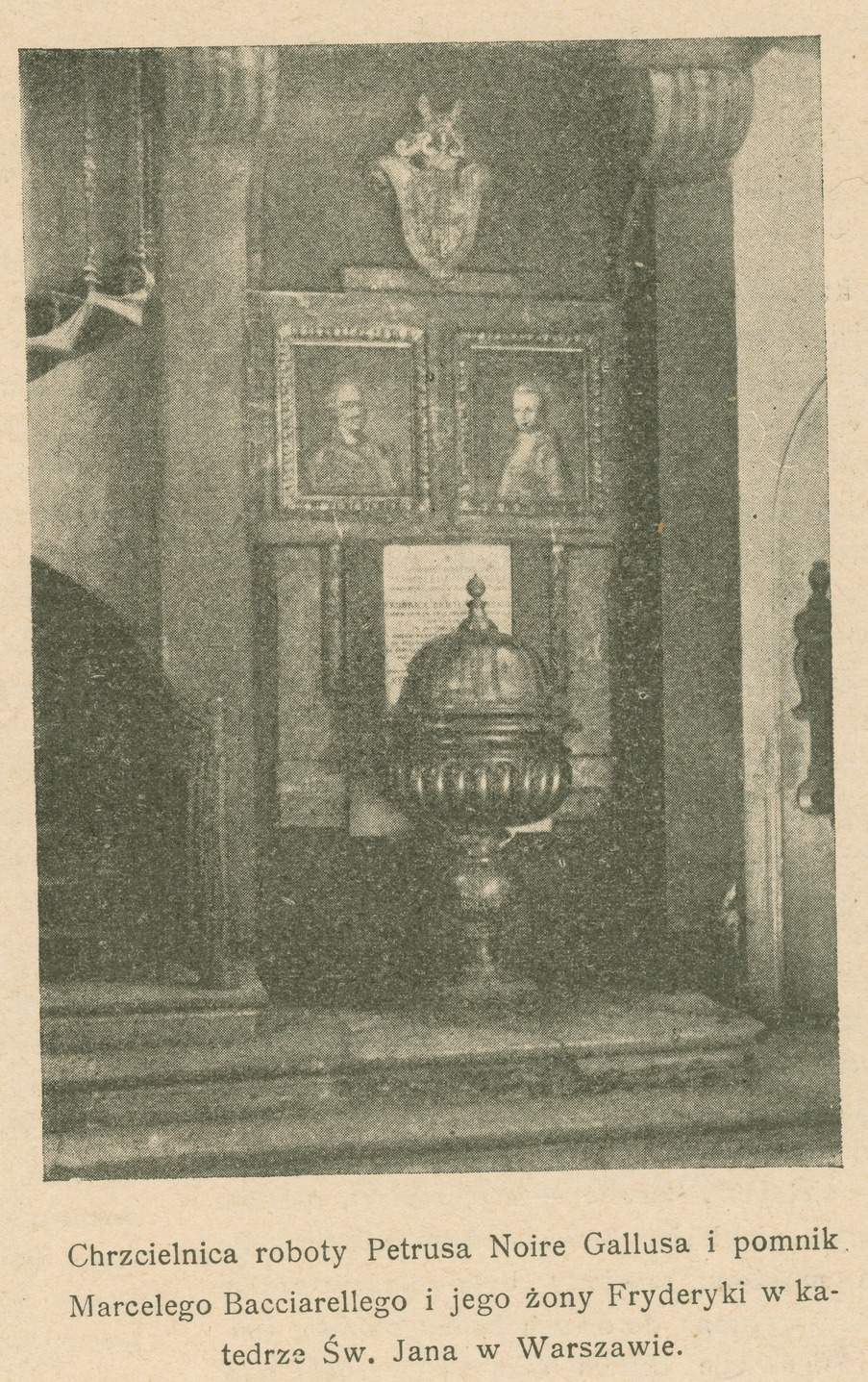
Memorial to Marcello and Johanna Bacciarelli at St. John's Archcathedral, Warsaw

== Illness and death ==
She suffered from epilepsy. She died in Warsaw, probably on 26 February, 1809, or in 1811 or 1812.

Johanna's two daughters, Anna and Manon, continued the family's artistic traditions by learning to draw. After studying with both parents, Anna became a miniaturist and a singer.
