= Battle of Białołęka =

Coordinates: 52°11′34″N 20°53′23″E

- Part of Polish–Russian War 1830–1831
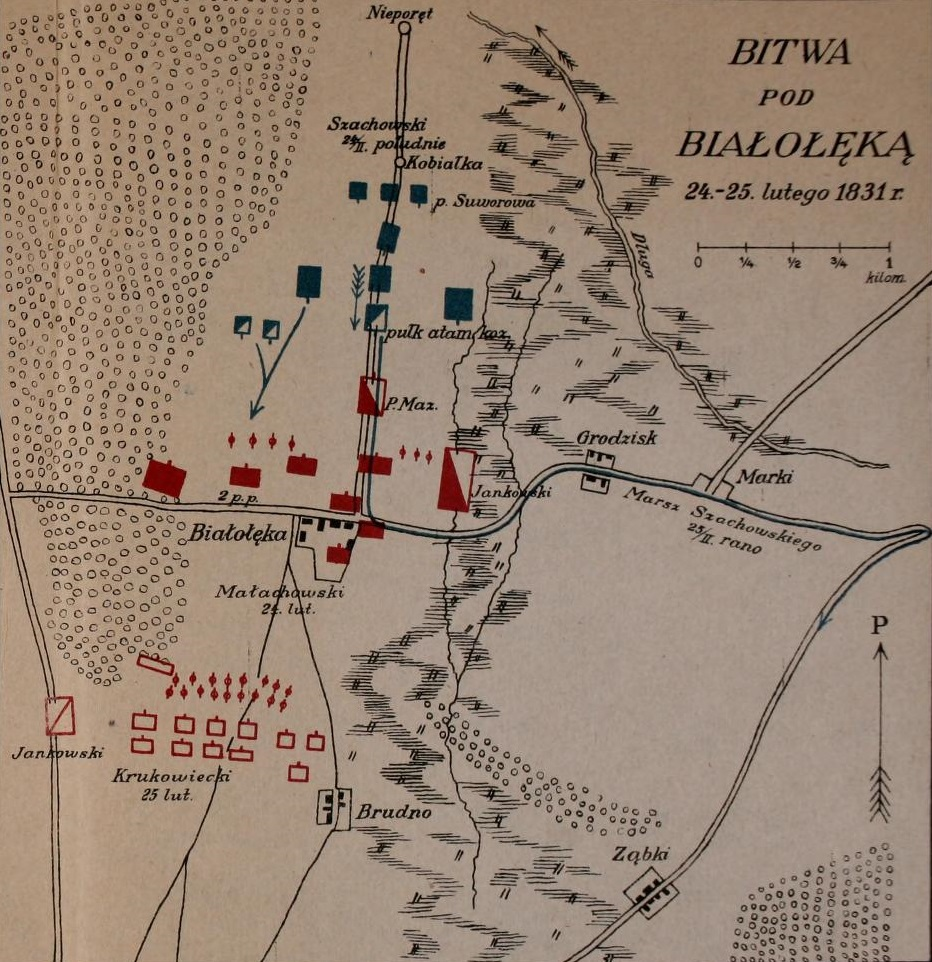
- Map of the battle
Date	24–25 February 1831
Location	Near Warsaw, Poland
Result	Polish victory

Belligerents
Poland	Imperial Russia

Commanders and leaders
(Poland) Jan Krukowiecki (Poland) Antoni Giełgud (Poland) Kazimierz Małachowski	(Russia) Ivan Shakhovskoy

Strength
13,000 men, 22 cannons	11,000 men, 56 cannons

Casualties and losses
770 killed and wounded	1,070 killed and wounded

The Battle of Białołęka was fought from 24 to 25 February 1831 in the village of Białołęka, Poland, during the November Uprising. Though the Polish forces were victorious over the Russians, the outcome was not decisive, and was inconclusive in the scope of the larger Russo-Polish War.

== Historical context ==
On 29 November 1830 a group of young, non-commissioned officers in the Imperial Russian Army's military academy in Warsaw revolted against the rule of the Russian Empire in Poland and Lithuania. The following day, armed Polish civilians forced the Russian troops to withdraw north from Warsaw.

The Russo-Polish War officially began in early February 1831, when a 115,000-strong Russian army led by Field Marshal Hans Karl von Diebitsch crossed Polish borders. The first major battle took place on 14 February 1831 near the village of Stoczek near Łuków, where Polish cavalry under the command of Brigadier Józef Dwernicki defeated the Russian division of Teodor Geismar. The victory had psychological rather than militaristic significance, as it did little to slow the Russian advance towards Warsaw. Subsequent victories at Dobre on 17 February and at Wawer on 19 and 20 February bolstered Polish spirits, but were inconclusive.

Białołęka was a small town located North of Warsaw. The road to the capital passed through Białołęka, continued south through the villages of Bródno and Praga, and then crossed the Vistula into Warsaw.

== Combatants ==
The Russian forces, under the command of Ivan Shakhovskiy, included 11,000 men and 56 cannons. Their orders were to march through Białołęka and to continue to Brodno.

Polish forces under the command of Jan Krukowiecki, Antoni Giełgud and Kazimierz Małachowski were in fortified positions to protect the entrance to the capital city. Their combined forces included 13,000 men and 22 cannons. These forces included 2,700 cavalry and 1,200 infantry under the command of Antoni Jankowski.

== Battle ==
The Battle of Białołęka lasted two days. After the first day, the Polish had lost 450 men, while the Russians had suffered 650 losses. During the second day, Polish forces suffered 320 losses, while the Russians suffered 430. In total, 670 Polish soldiers were killed or wounded, compared to 1,070 Russians.

Fighting commenced on 24 February at approximately 09:00 AM. Russian troops attacked the combined forces of General Kazimierz Małachowski (4,200 infantry, 6 cannons) and Antoni Jankowski (2,700 cavalry, 1,200 infantry), who had taken positions within the town and surrounding woods. Russian forces attacked the Hussars who were entrenched in the forest, and suffered heavy losses. After many hours of fierce fighting, the Polish forces were pushed back from their position and into the countryside.

The Polish high command sent Antoni Giełgud to reinforce Małachowski and Jankowski, and ordered Jan Krukowiecki to take charge of the Polish forces at Białołęka. The reinforcements arrived at the battlefield just before sunset, and skirmishing continued through the night.

Suspecting that Krukowiecki's forces were vastly outnumbered, Polish military authorities ordered their forces to hold their positions, and to only retaliate in the event that the Russians attempted to press on towards Warsaw. Ironically, Shakhovskiy received similar orders from Field Marshal von Diebitsch: if attacked by Polish forces, he was to withdraw immediately. Shakhovskiy withdrew to the town of Marki directly to the east, and was pursued by Krukowiecki, whose flanking maneuver threw the Russian forces into disorder. The Polish forces were able to take back Białołęka, but the disorganization of the Russian forces made it impossible to strike a decisive blow.

== Aftermath ==
By 24 February the Russian Army had reached the outskirts of Warsaw in two columns: one from the North under the command of General Shakhovskiy, and one from the East under the command of General Grigoriy Vladimirovich Rosen. Field Marshal von Diebitsch initially planned a full frontal assault on Warsaw to take place on 26 February. The successful Polish counter-attack at Białołęka, however, prompted von Diebitsch to change his plans and attack earlier. On 25 February General Rosen received orders to attack, resulting in the Battle of Olszynka Grochowska. His forces were joined later that day by the remnants of Shakhovskiy's defeated column.

== See also ==
- November Uprising
