= Piotr Szembek Square =

Urban square in Warsaw, Poland

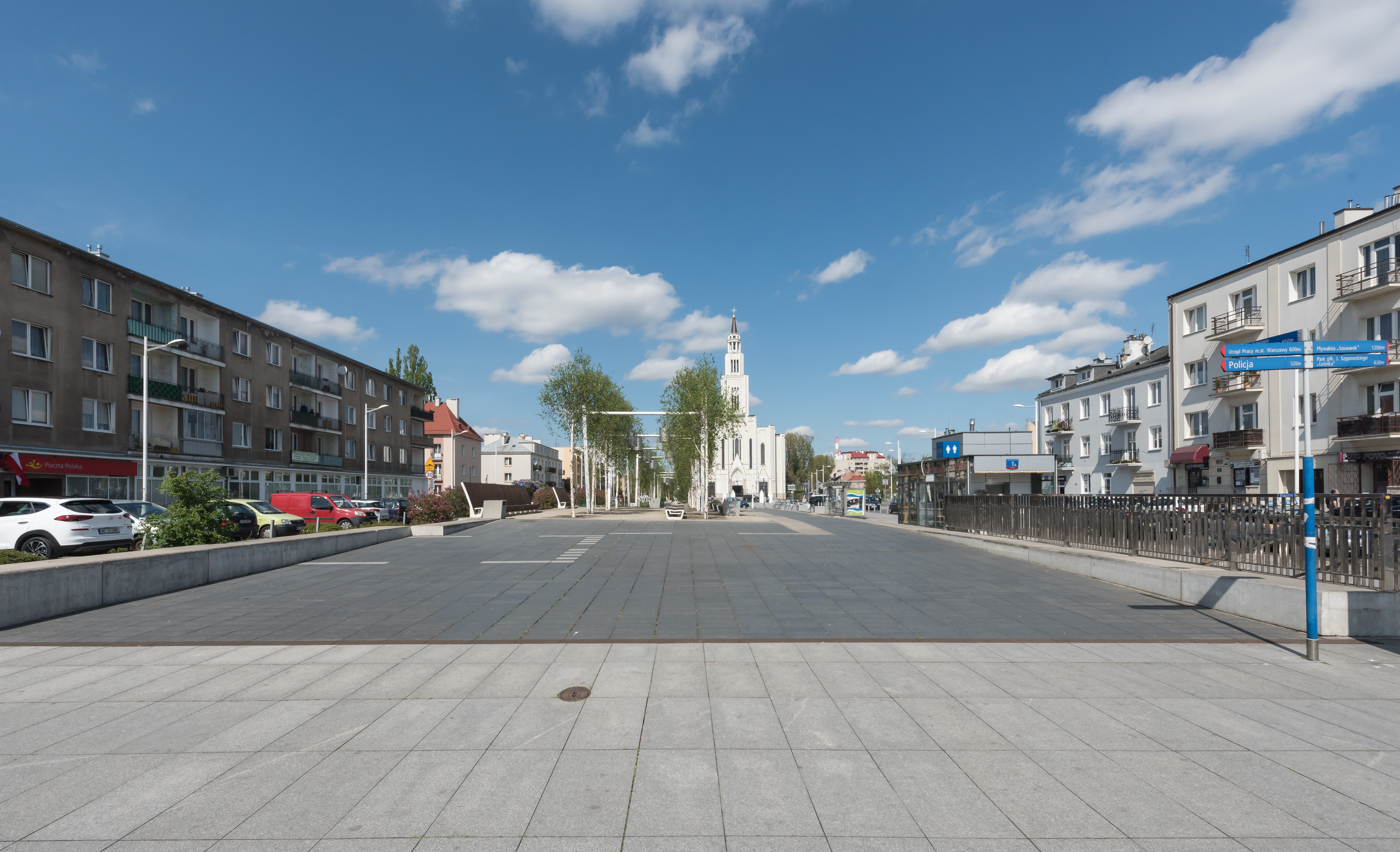
- Piotr Szembek Square in 2020

- Location within Warsaw
- Namesake: Piotr Szembek
- Type: Urban square
- Location: Praga-South, Warsaw, Poland
- Coordinates: 52°14′35.54″N 21°06′07.77″E

Construction
- Completion: 1919

Piotr Szembek Square (Polish pronunciation: [ˈpjɔtr ˈʂɛm.bɛk]; Polish: Plac Piotra Szembeka) is an urban square in Warsaw, Poland. It is located in the district of Praga-Południe, between Grochowska, Kordeckiego, Zaliwskiego, Zamienieckiej, Sztuki, and Chłopickiego Streets. The square was constructed in 1919.

== History ==
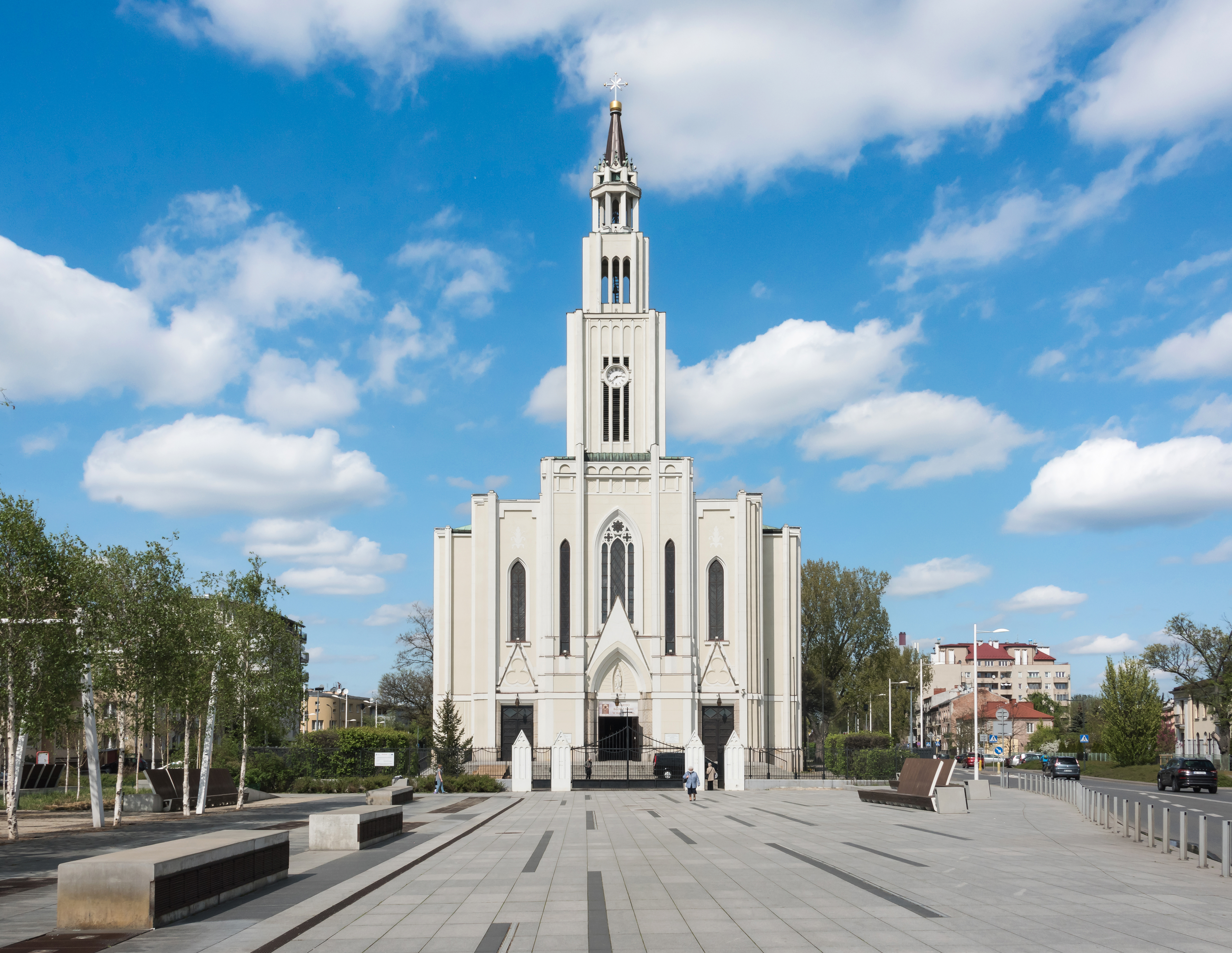
Church of the Immaculate Heart of Mary

The square was constructed in 1919, and named after Piotr Szembek, a 19th-century military officer, and general in the Polish insurgent army during the November Uprising.

Between 1934 and 1946, next to the square, at 3 and 5 Chłopickiego Street, the Catholic Church of the Immaculate Heart of Mary was constructed. It was erected as a memorial to the Battle of Olszynka Grochowska from 1831.

During the interwar period, the Szembek Market began operating near the square. It stayed open under the German occupation in the Second World War. It was reactivated in 1944, as the first market opened in the city after the war. In 2016, most of the market was replaced by the Centrum Szembeka shopping centre.

The square was renovated and remodelled between 2011 and 2012.

== Characteristics ==
The square is located in the district of Praga-South, between Grochowska, Kordeckiego, Zaliwskiego, Zamienieckiej, Sztuki, and Chłopickiego Streets.

Next to the square, at 3 and 5 Chłopickiego Street, is the Church of the Immaculate Heart of Mary. To the south of the square, between Gdecka, Komorska, and Zamieniecka Streets, is the Szembek Market. Nearby, at 90 Zamieniecka Street, is the Centrum Szembeka shopping centre.
