= Battle of Rajgród =

Battle on 29 May 1831 between Poles and Imperial Russia in the November Uprising

Coordinates: 53°44′00″N 22°42′00″E

- Part of Polish–Russian War 1830–1831
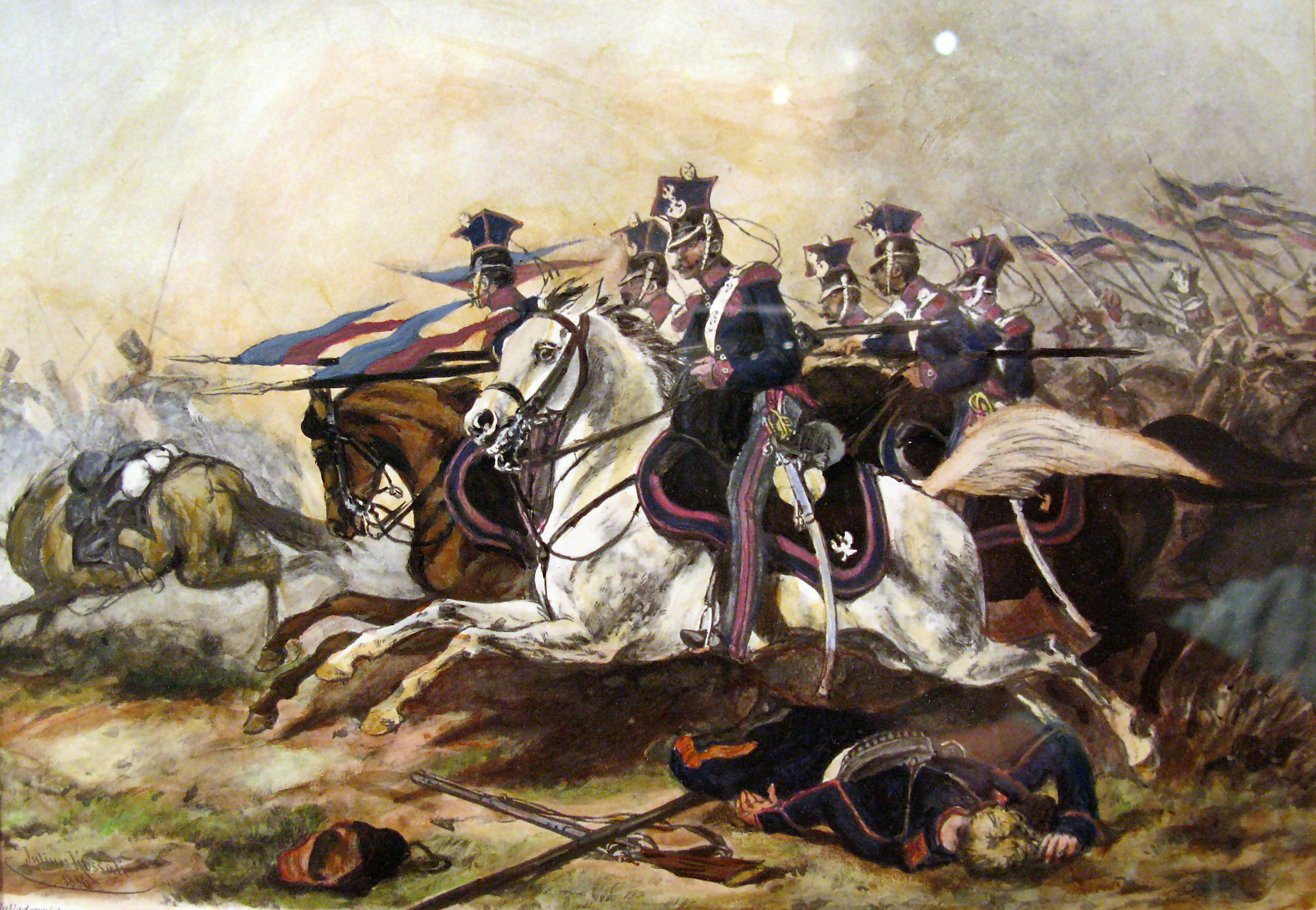
- Charge of the Poznan Cavalry during the Battle of Rajgrod by Juliusz Kossak
Date	29 May 1831
Location	Rajgród, Poland
Result	Polish victory

Belligerents
Poland	Imperial Russia

Commanders and leaders
(Poland) Antoni Giełgud	(Russia) Dmitri Osten-Sacken

Strength
12,000 men, 10 cannons	5,800 men, 14 cannons

Casualties and losses
Unknown	Unknown

The Battle of Rajgród was fought on 29 May 1831 between Poland and Imperial Russia, during the November Uprising. The Poles, according to some accounts, were victorious.

== Background ==
Due to the Polish expedition against the Russian guards in the area led by Antanas Gelgaudas failing near Łomża, a retreat was ordered to Rajgród, where they would encounter the Russians, which had a force of 5,800 men.

After the Battle of Ostrołęka Gelgaudas' force planned a march on Lithuania, which also included the city as part of the route.

== Battle ==
Both forces met, and as the guards started a fight Atantanas' vanguard near the village of Miecze, they were attacked during a march and forced to retreat to Rajgród, which they were pushed out of and lost the battle, which resulted in 800 casualties and 1,200 prisoners of war.

This victory was an important strategic move for the Poles, as the Russians gave them an open way to Lithuania, where there was an active partisan movement since February.
