= Battle of Olszynka Grochowska =

November Uprising battle 1831

Coordinates: 52°14′55″N 21°6′28″E

- Part of the November Uprising
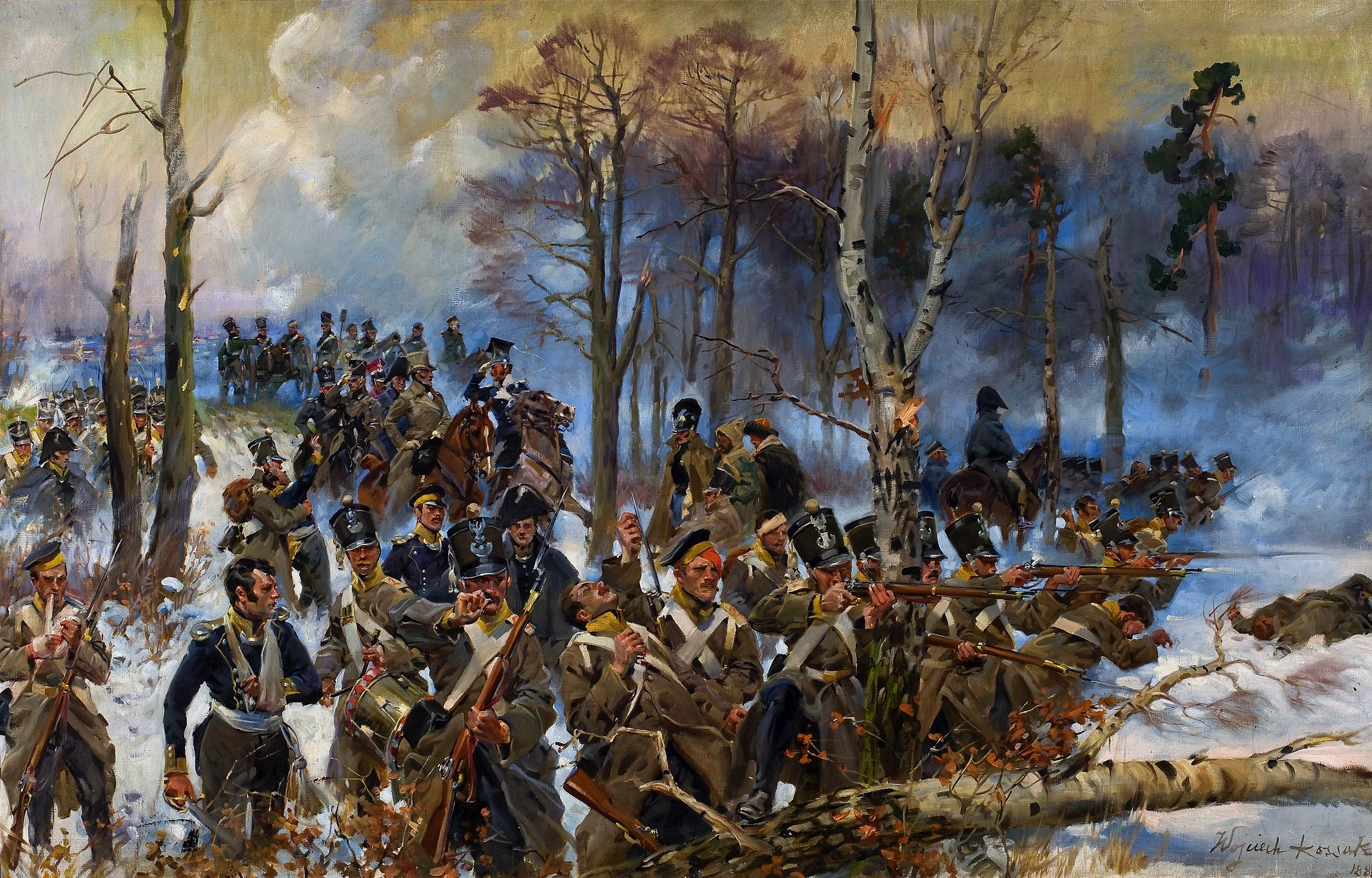
- Olszynka Grochowska, an 1931 painting by Wojciech Kossak
Date	25 February 1831
Location	Olszynka Grochowska east of Warsaw, Poland
Result	See § Aftermath

Belligerents
Kingdom of Poland	(Russia) Russian Empire

Commanders and leaders
Józef Chłopicki; Jan Zygmunt Skrzynecki; Jan Krukowiecki	(Russia) Hans Karl von Diebitsch (Russia) Grigory Vladimirovich Rosen

Strength
36,000–40,000 men, 115 cannon	60,000 men, 178 cannon

Casualties and losses
Estimates: • Polish: 6,800; • Russian: 12,000; • Other: 7,000–9,500 casualties (Note: 7,000; 9,500, 3 cannons)	Estimates: • Polish: 9,400; • Russian: 9,500; • Other: at least 9,500 casualties; up to 10,500

The Battle of Olszynka Grochowska, or the battle of Grochów, (Note: Russian: Сражение при Грохове) was fought on 25 February 1831 in the woods near Grochów, on the eastern outskirts of Warsaw. The Polish army, commanded by Józef Chłopicki, succeeded in preventing its Russian counterpart, under Hans Karl von Diebitsch, from crushing the uprising. However, the battle has also been described as an inconclusive bloodbath.

== Prelude ==
The first months after the outbreak of the November Uprising saw no hostilities between Poland and Russia. Both the Polish commander Józef Chłopicki and Russian Tsar Nicholas I were hoping for a peaceful solution to the conflict. However, neither side could propose a satisfactory compromise, and on 25 January 1831 Nicholas was deposed from the Polish throne.

This was seen as a de facto declaration of war and the Russian Army under Hans Karl von Diebitsch was ordered to enter Poland and crush the rebellion. The Russian army entered Poland on 4 February and started a fast advance towards Warsaw. Despite several minor battles and skirmishes, in which the Russian army suffered significant losses, the advance could not be stopped by the Polish forces, which were both numerically and technically inferior.

On 24 February the Russian Army reached the outskirts of Warsaw in two columns. Initially Diebitsch was planning an all-out assault on Warsaw on 26 February. However, the successful Polish counter-attack in the Battle of Białołęka, in which the 13,500 men strong Corps of General Ivan Shakhovskoy was defeated and forced to retreat, made Diebitsch change his plans and attack earlier than planned.

== Armies ==
The Polish forces deployed to the east of Warsaw constituted the majority of the Polish Army. Apart from the II Infantry Brigade under General Kazimierz Małachowski, dispatched to the north to take part in the Battle of Białołęka, the forces of General Józef Chłopicki included some 36,000 soldiers and 115 cannon of various calibres. The majority of the Polish forces was composed of fresh, poorly trained and ill-equipped volunteers. However, the core of the Polish Army was composed of Napoleonic Wars veterans.

The Russian forces had some 59,000 men under arms and 178 cannon. In addition, at 15:00 the weakened corps of General Shakhovskiy arrived at the battlefield and took part in the assault. The forces of Field Marshal Diebitsch were organised into five Infantry Corps, with some cavalry units attached to them. However, the main part of the Russian cavalry was defeated in the Battle of Stoczek and did not enter the combat.

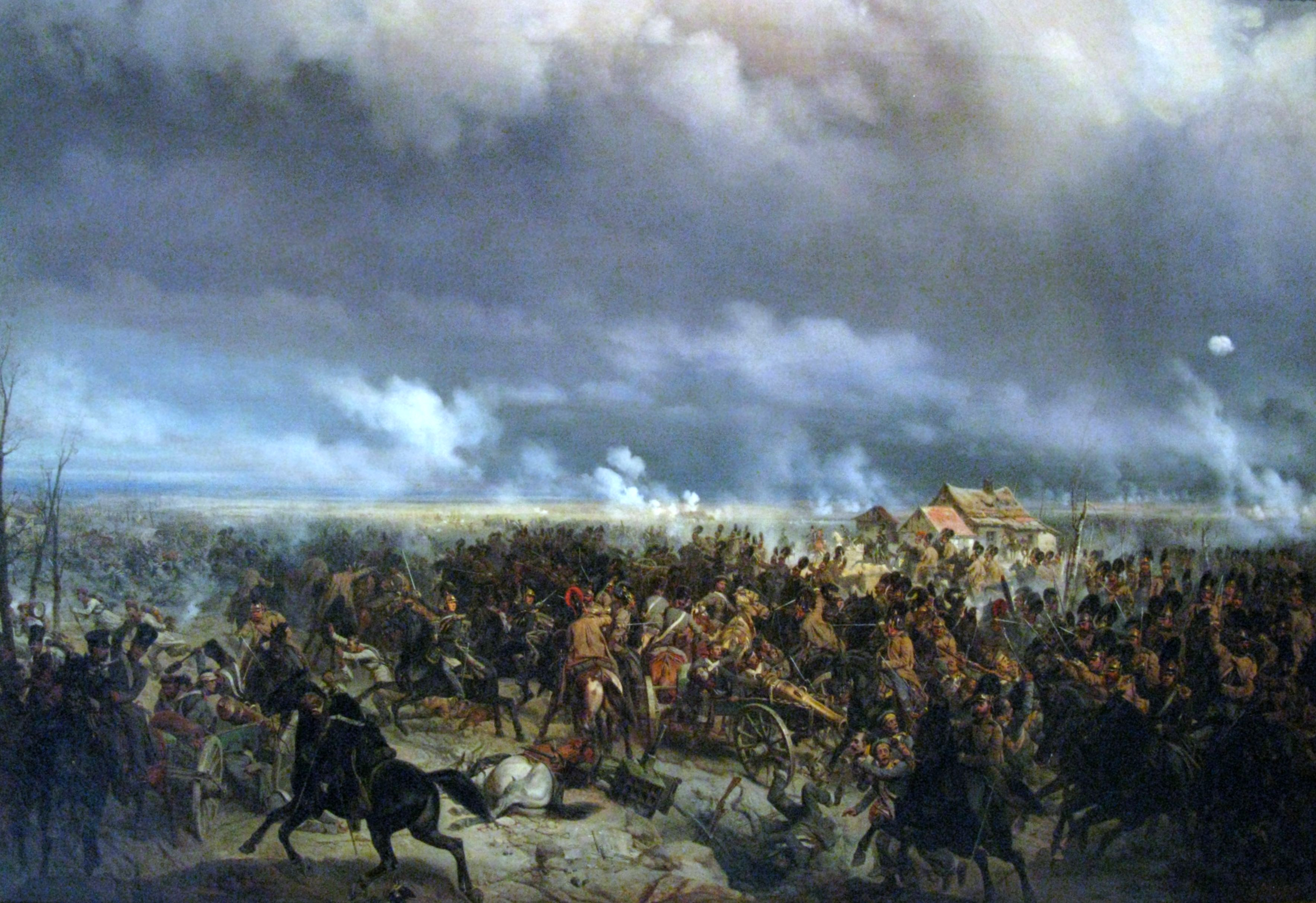
Battle of Grochów 1831

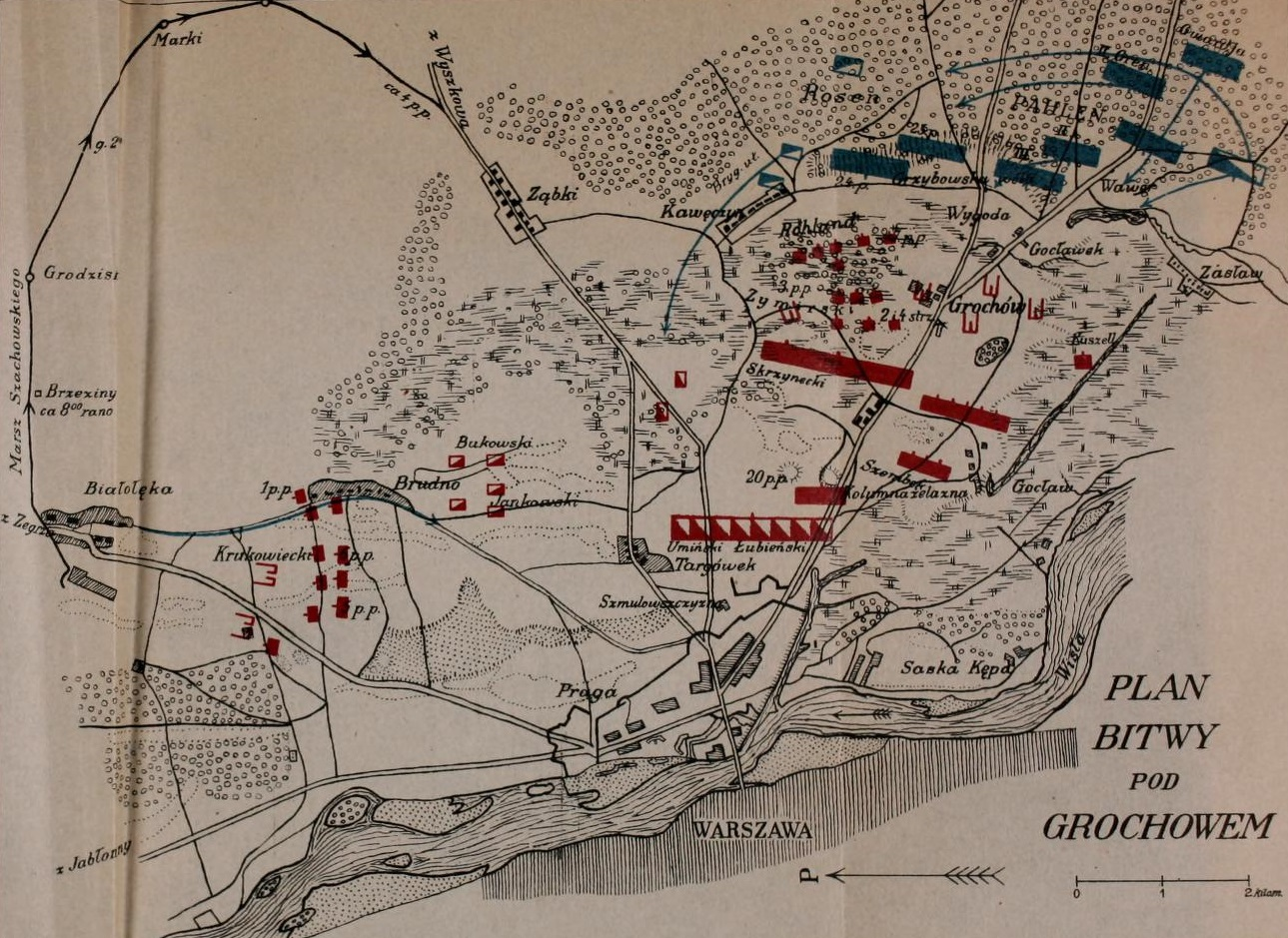
Map of the battle

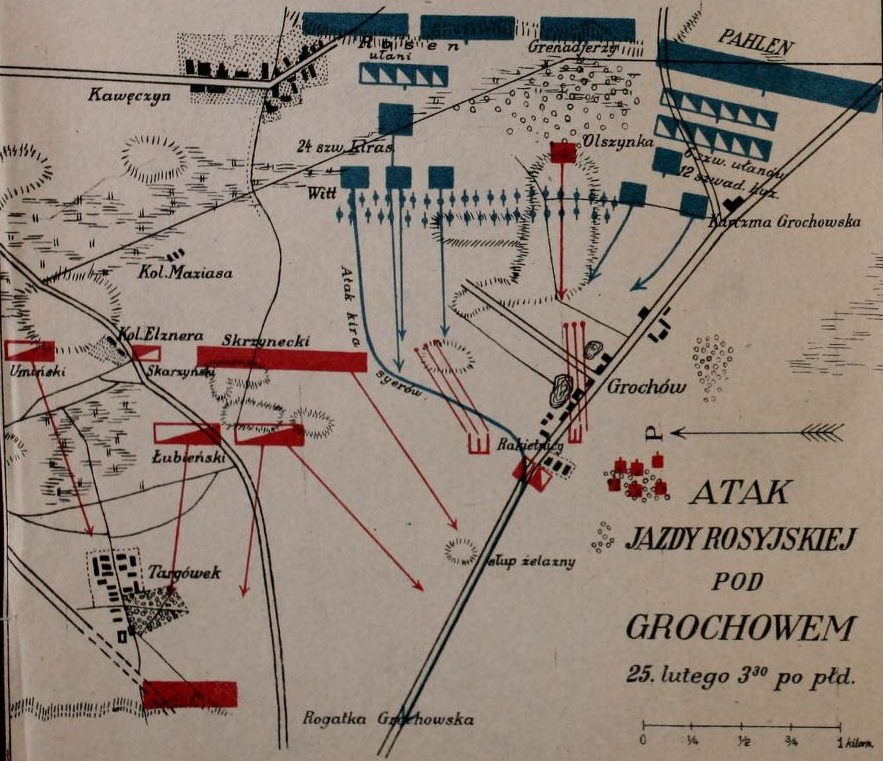
Map of the attack of the Russian cavalry at 3h30 PM.jpg

== Battle ==
The Polish counter-attack in the area of Białołęka on 24 February surprised the Russians. In the early morning of 25 February, after both units taking part in the Battle of Białołęka were on the verge of breaking after a night-long city fight, the Poles threw in the reserve 1st Infantry Division under General Jan Krukowiecki. The Russians started a retreat and the Poles started a pursuit, but the Polish advance was halted after an hour.

The sound of the nearby battle made Field Marshal Diebitsch (Dibich-Zabalkansky) change his plans and order an assault on Polish positions 24 hours earlier than planned. At noon the I Corps and the Corps of General Grigoriy Vladimirovich Rosen were ordered to assault the Polish 2nd and 3rd Infantry Divisions (Generals Skrzynecki and Żymirski, respectively) in the woods east of Grochów. At the same time the Corps of General Pahlen was ordered to outflank the Poles from the south and strike through the lines of the Polish 4th Infantry Division of General Szembek.

Although the Russians had numerical superiority and better equipment on their side, the Polish lines were well-hidden in the woods and the Russian artillery had difficulties supporting the advancing infantry. Congreve rockets designed by Józef Bem also helped disrupt Russian cavalry charges. Despite numerous assaults, both the woods and the Grochów-Gocławek road were still in Polish hands at dusk. After suffering heavy casualties, the Russians withdrew from the battlefield. However, the Poles had also lost a large part of their forces and were unable to organise a successful pursuit.

== Aftermath ==
In the course of a day-long struggle the Russians lost at least 9,500 killed and wounded, and were forced to abandon their plans of capturing Warsaw and ending the Polish uprising with one blow. Polish losses were also heavy, ranging from 6,900 to 12,000 dead and wounded. However, Chłopicki did not start a pursuit after the fleeing Russians and did not take advantage of the success.

Because of this, the battle is described as a marginal Polish victory in most handbooks and monographs, both modern and contemporary. Some authors argue that, although the Russian forces were badly beaten and forced to retreat and abandon their plans of capturing Warsaw, the lack of Polish pursuit resulted in the battle being either a Pyrrhic victory, a marginal victory, or simply an inconclusive bloodbath. Finally, several Russian sources claim that the result of the battle was a Russian victory.

== Sources ==
1. Andrzej Garlicki (2003). Historia 1815-1939; Polska i świat (in Polish). Warsaw, Scholar. p. 444. ISBN 83-7383-041-3.
2. "Modern Synchronology". Synchronology of the Principal Events in Sacred And Profane History. Kessinger Publishing Company. April 2005. p. 324. ISBN 1-4179-5419-1.
3. Velichko, Konstantin; Novitsky, Vasily; Schwartz, Alexey von; Apushkin, Vladimir; Schoultz, Gustav von (1912). Военная энциклопедия Сытина [Sytin Military Encyclopedia] (in Russian). Vol. VIII: Гимры – Двигатели судовые. Moscow: Типография Т-ва И. Д. Сытина.
4. "Польское восстание 1830 и 1863 г. (Polish uprisings of 1830 and 1863)" (in Russian).
5. Bodart, Gaston (1908). Militär-historisches Kriegs-Lexikon (1618–1905) (in German). Vienna and Leipzig: C. W. Stern.
