= Dmitri Osten-Sacken =

Russian general (1789–1881)

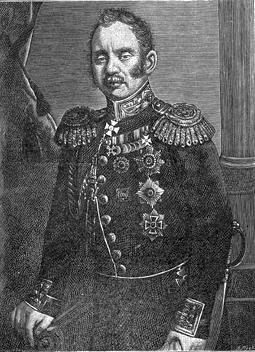
Dmitri Osten-Sacken

Dmitri Yerofeyevich Osten-Sacken (Russian: Дмитрий Ерофеевич Остен-Сакен; 24 April 1789 – 4 March 1881) was a Russian general of Baltic German/Russian descent, member of the State Council, commander in charge of military settlements in the South of Russia during the Crimean War.

== Early life ==
Born in to an ancient German Baltic noble family, Dmitri was born as the son of Baron Ulrich Hieronymus Kasimir von der Osten-Sacken (1748-1808) and his wife, Anna Efimovna Tozlukova.

== Biography ==
He participated in Napoleonic Wars, Russo-Persian War (1826–1828), Russo-Turkish War (1828–29), suppression of the November Uprising in Poland (incl. the battles at Rajgród and Paneriai), Russian conquest of Caucasus, and the Crimean War, overall 15 campaigns and over 90 battles and skirmishes. Serving over 50 years in various ranks of General, he was recipient of many military awards. He is also the author or a number of literary works and memoirs related to military.

== Personal life ==
He was married to Anna Ivanovna Ushakova (1805-1897) and had two sons:

- Count Vladimir von der Osten-Sacken (1829-1885); married in 1870 to Princess to Alexandra Dmitrievna Urussova (1851-1920) and had issue
- Baron Nicholas von der Osten-Sacken (1831-1912); married in 1861 to Princess Maria Ilinichna Dolgoroukaya (1822-1907); no issue
