= Antoni Giełgud =

Brigadier General Antoni Giełgud Antanas Gelgaudas
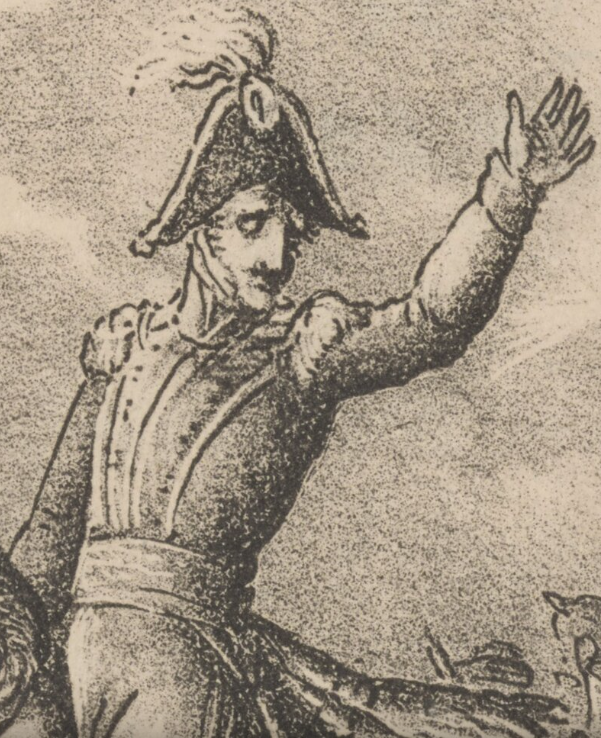
- Antoni Giełgud, anonymous 19th-century litography
- Born: 27 April 1792; Panemunė Castle, Kovno Governorate, Russian Empire
- Died: 23 December 1831 (aged 25); Agluona river, Kovno Governorate, Russian Empire
- Buried: Kisiniai cemetery
- Noble family: Gelgaudai (Giełgud)
- Father: Michał Giełgud
- Mother: Eleonara Tyszkiewicz
- Military career
- Allegiance: Polish–Lithuanian insurgents
- Service years: 1830–1831
- Rank: Brigadier General
- Units: 21st Lithuanian Infantry Regiment (Duchy of Warsaw), 1st Brigade of the 1st Infantry Division, 1st Infantry Division (under Jan Krukowiecki), 2nd Infantry Division
- Conflicts: Battle of Wawer, Battle of Białołęka, Battle of Ostrołęka, Battle of Rajgród, Battle of Paneriai

Antoni Giełgud (Lithuanian: Antanas Gelgaudas; 27 April 1792 – 13 July 1831) was a Polish-Lithuanian brigadier general and leader of the Polish-Lithuanian forces during the November Uprising.

== Biography ==
=== Early life ===
Antoni Giełgud was born on 27 April 1792 in the Panemunė Castle, then part of the Kovno Governorate of the Russian Empire. Through his father he was a descendant of the Giełgud (Gelgaudai) noble family, while through his mother, of the Tyszkiewicz noble family. Giełgud was a son of Michał Giełgud, a member of the Permanent Council, and Eleonara Tyszkiewicz, daughter of Stanisław Antoni Tyszkiewicz, castellan of Samogitia.

=== Napoleonic Wars ===
During the French invasion of Russia, he financed and commanded the creation of the 21st Lithuanian Infantry Regiment of the Army of the Duchy of Warsaw, which he led since 29 August 1812. He took part in the defence of Modlin fortress. For his contributions to the French campaign, he was awarded the rank of colonel.

=== November Uprising ===
In 1818 he was appointed as a brigadier general of the 1st Brigade of the 1st Infantry Division of Kingdom of Poland army by Grand Duke Konstantin. During the November Uprising he returned to active service and initially served as a commanding officer of the 1st Brigades 1st Infantry Division under Jan Krukowiecki. A hero of the battles of Wawer and Białołęka, he was given command over the entire 2nd Infantry Division. He covered the retreat of Polish-Lithuanian forces after the battle of Ostrołęka, but got separated from the main force and decided to head for Lithuania instead. In June 1831 he was appointed the leader of the rebellion in Lithuania.

He defeated the Russians in the Battle of Rajgród, but his assault of Vilnius failed and his corps composed of his own division and the forces of Dezydery Chłapowski lost over 2,000 men in the battle of Paneriai. Unable to return to Polish-Lithuanian main forces at that time converging on Warsaw, he decided to head to Klaipėda, where he was expecting foreign reinforcements. En route, however, all three of Giełgud's columns were intercepted by the Russians and forced to cross the Prussian border. Giełgud himself soon after crossing the border was shot dead by one of his staff officers, enraged by his poor command. He died on 31 August 1831 in the Šnaukštai village while crossing the Agluona river, where he was buried.

Three to five years after the uprising, the Tsar of Russia agreed to transfer the remains of Giełgud to a cemetery in Kisiniai, 10 kilometres (6.2 mi) from Klaipėda. Giełgud's grave was abandoned up until 1928 or 1929 when representatives of the noble family from the United Kingdom sent over money with a request to the eldership to clean up his grave. It was decorated with a cross, and became a gathering spot for the youth. Giełgud's rebellious legacy is still celebrated to this day.

== Bibliography ==
- Zarembianka, Zofia (1958). "Antoni Giełgud". Polski Słownik Biograficzny (in Polish). Vol. 7. Wrocław. pp. 438–440.
