= Józef Kosiński =

Polish painter (1753–1821)

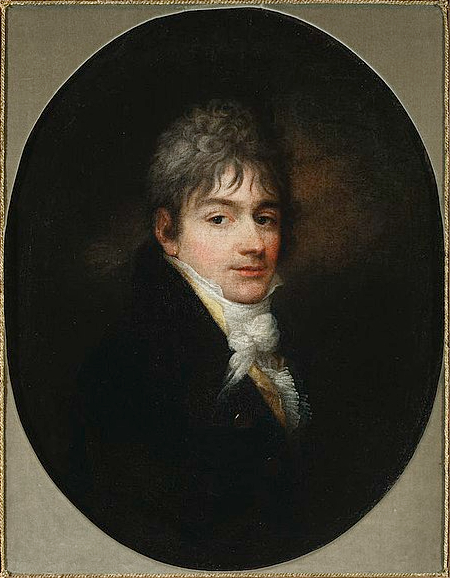
Self-portrait (c.1803)

Józef Kosiński (1753, Kraków - 1 April 1821, Warsaw) was a Polish portrait and miniature painter.

== Life and works ==
He was born to Michał Kosiński and Marianna née Jaraczewska, members of a noble family, bearing the Rogala coat of arms. His younger brother, Baron Michał Kosińsky (1773-1835), would later bequeath his title to Jozef's son, Colonel Jozef-Jan Kosiński. The bequest was approved by the Governing Senate in 1836.

He studied painting with the Italian artist, Marcello Bacciarelli, who had been employed by King Augustus III. He later made a trip to Italy for further studies. Upon returning, he was appointed a court painter by King Stanisław II August. Within a short time, he was awarded the Medal Bene Merentibus and, from 1789, received a pension of 10 ducats monthly.

From 1791 to 1794, he maintained a close professional relationship with Josef Grassi, an Austrian portrait painter, who was forced to leave Poland during the Kościuszko Uprising.

Most of his clients were among the minor nobility, but he also created portraits of people who were more widely known, such as Tadeusz Kościuszko, Izabela Czartoryska and Hans Moritz Hauke. He worked in both oils and watercolors. Students and apprentices were welcome in his studio. Often, he would focus on a portrait's face, and allow them to complete the rest; a common practice at that time. Antoni Blank and Józefat Ignacy Łukasiewicz were among his best-known students. Relatively few of his paintings have survived, but some may be seen at museums in Warsaw and Kraków.

== Sources ==
- Biography and works by Jacek Kopeć, from Malarstwo polskie
- Stanisław Szenic, Cmentarz Powązkowski 1790-1850. Zmarli i ich rodziny, Państwowy Instytut Wydawniczy, 1979, ISBN 83-06-00281-4
