= Aukštieji Paneriai =

Suburb of Vilnius, Lithuania, and site of the Ponary massacre

- Eldership
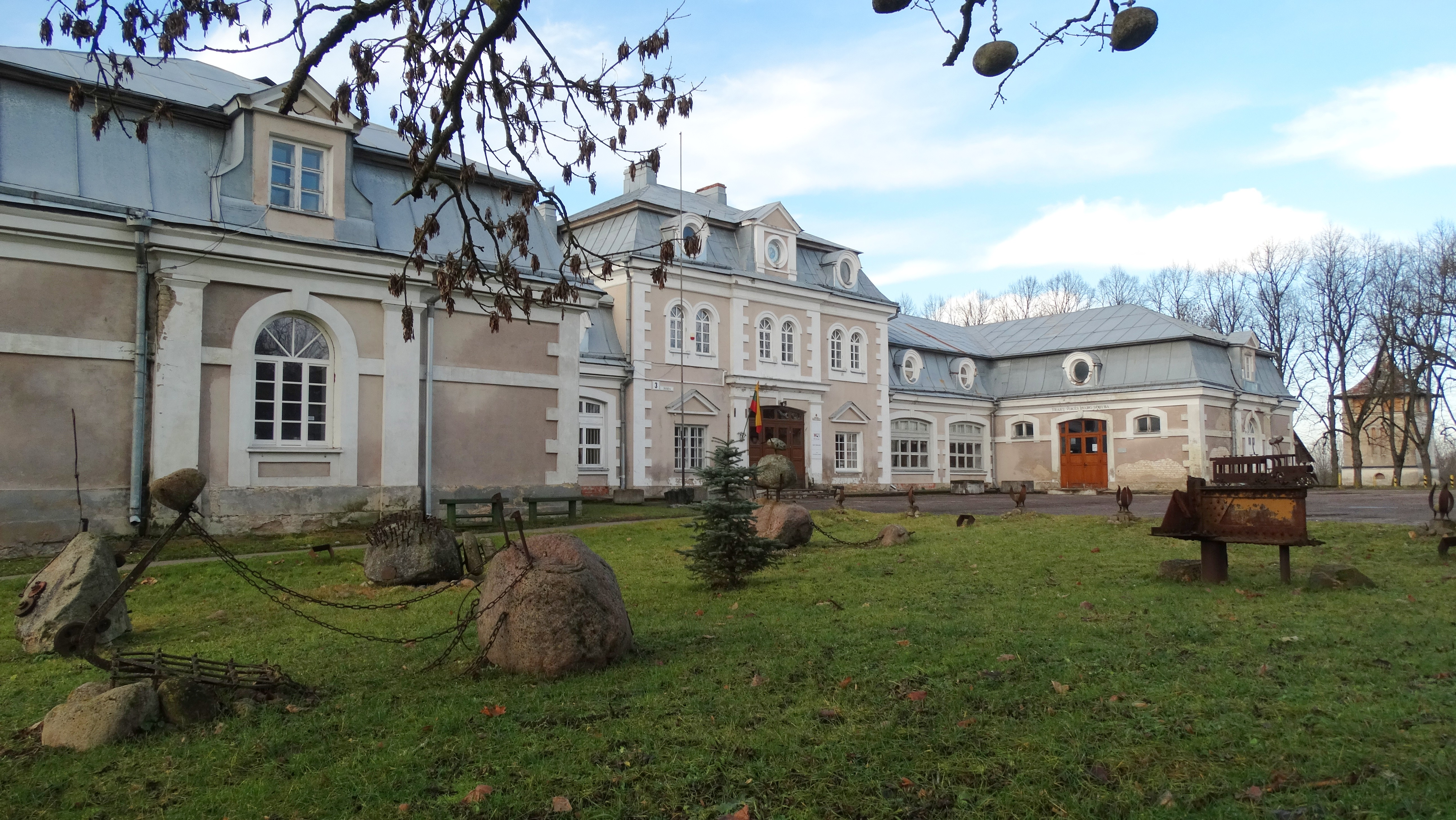
- Eldership administration building

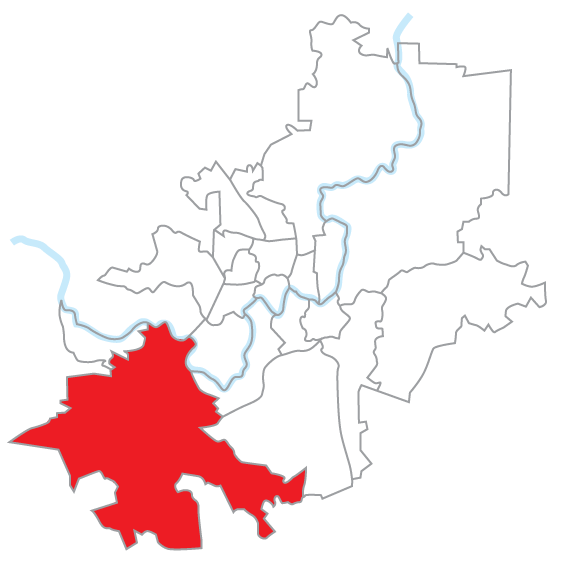

- Location of Aukštieji Paneriai
- Country: Lithuania
- County: Vilnius County
- Municipality: Vilnius city municipality

Area
  - Total: 84.8 km^{2} (32.7 sq mi)

Population (2021)
  - Total: 11,149
  - Density: 131/km^{2} (341/sq mi)
- Time zone: UTC+2 (EET)
  - Summer (DST): UTC+3 (EEST)

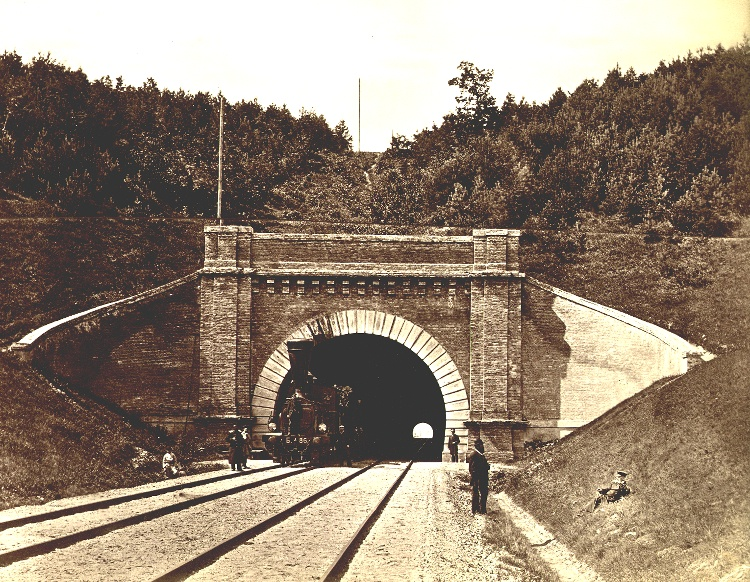
Railroad tunnel in Paneriai – the first in Lithuania. Photo from 1879.

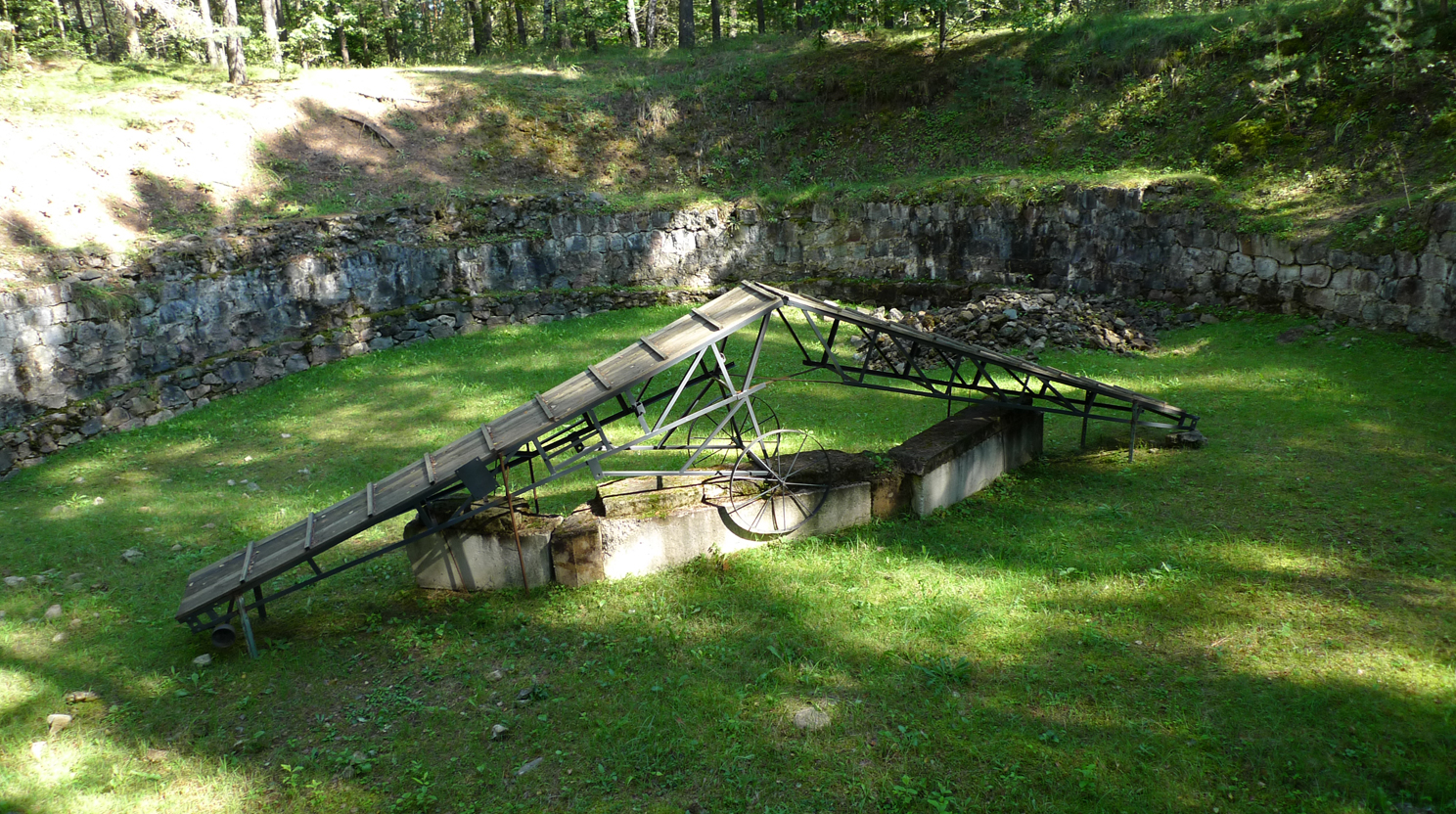
Pit used to burn corpses that were exhumed to destroy evidence of mass executions.

Aukštieji Paneriai (literally Lithuanian: "a place near Neris"; adapted to Polish: Ponary, Yiddish: פאנאר/Ponar) is a neighborhood of Vilnius, situated about 10 kilometres away from the city center. It is located on low forested hills, on the Vilnius-Warsaw road. Paneriai was the site of the Ponary massacre, a mass killing of as many as 100,000 people from Vilnius and nearby towns and villages during World War II.

== History ==
The village was probably founded some time in the 14th century. In 1390, it was acquired by the Vilnius Bishopric and soon became the main supplier of bricks to the nearby city. It shared a common history with Vilnius. After the final Partition of Poland in 1795, it became a part of the Vilna Governorate of the Russian Empire. During the November Uprising, on 19 June 1831, the Battle of Paneriai took place near the village, in which the forces of Dezydery Chłapowski and Antoni Giełgud were defeated by Russian infantry.

=== 20th century ===
As result of Russia's withdrawal from World War I, and the signing of the Treaty of Brest-Litovsk, the area was occupied by German forces and transferred to Lithuania. With Germany's defeat several months later the territory underwent significant political upheaval, but following the Lithuanian–Bolshevik War, Polish-Bolshevik War, and the Polish-Lithuanian War, it eventually became part of Poland. In 1939, after the invasion of Poland, the village was captured by the Soviet Union and transferred to Lithuania, only to be reannexed by Soviets the following year.

Between July 1941, and August 1944, Paneriai became the mass murder site of approximately 70,000 Jews, 20,000 Polish intelligentsia members, and 8,000 Russian POWs. The executions were planned and carried out by German units of SD and SS with help from local Lithuanian collaborationists Special SD and Security Police Squad. The site of the massacre is commemorated by a memorial to the victims of the Holocaust, a memorial to the Polish victims and a small museum.

Since 1990, again part of independent Lithuania, it was incorporated to the city of Vilnius as one of its districts.
