= Piotr Szembek =

Polish military officer (1788–1866)

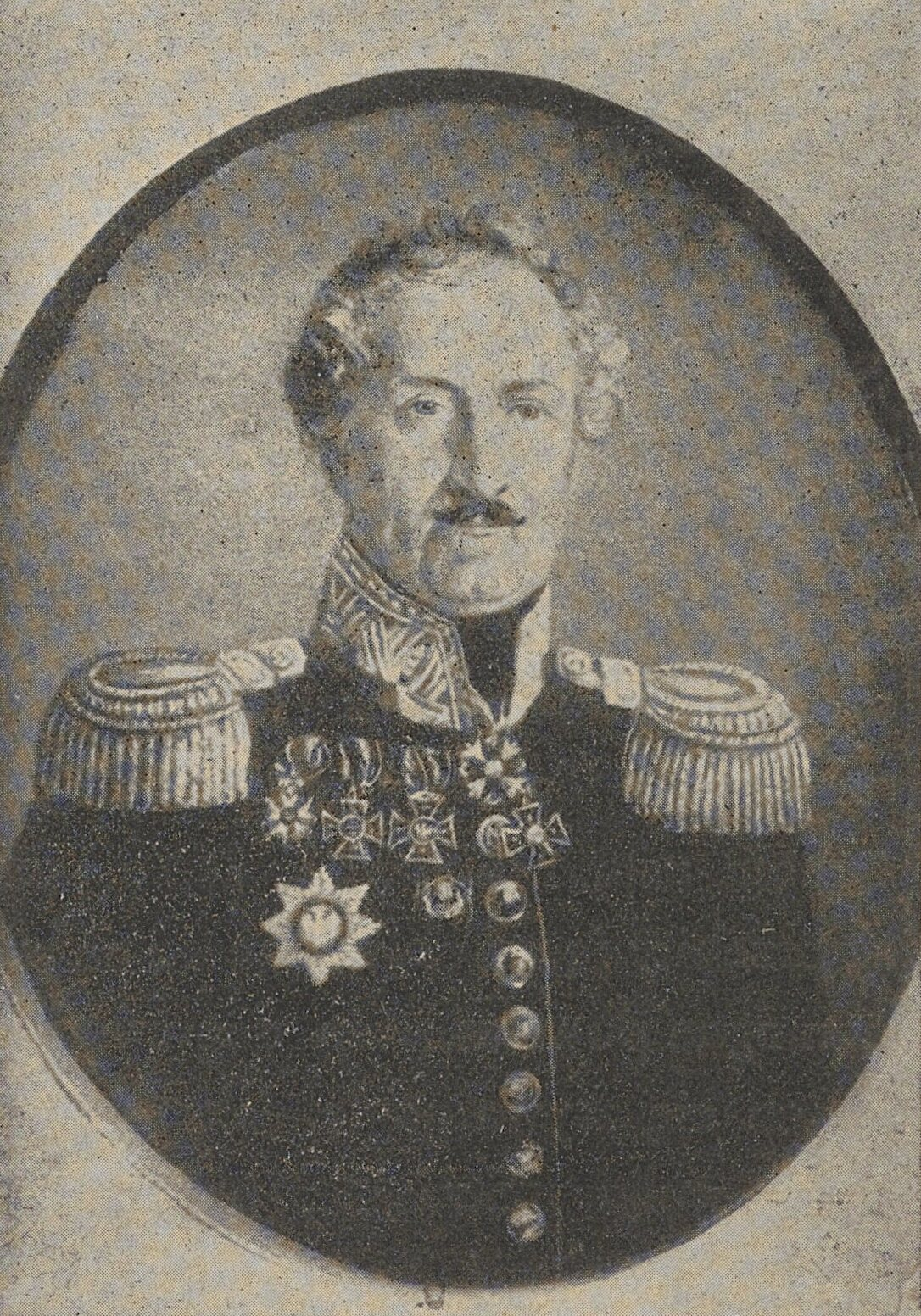
- Piotr Szembek in the military uniform.

Military Governor of Warsaw
- In office 4 December 1830 – 16 December 1830

Personal details
- Born: 14 December 1788 Warsaw, Kingdom of Poland, Polish–Lithuanian Commonwealth (now part of Poland)
- Died: March 21, 1866 (aged 77) Siemianice, Congress Poland, Russian Empire
- Spouse: Fryderyka Henrietta Bécu de Tavernie (m. 1813)
- Children: Aleksander Szembek
- Education: Berlin Knight Academy

Military service
- Allegiance: Duchy of Warsaw (1807–1813); Congress Poland (1815–1830); Insurgents of the November Uprising (1830–1831)
- Branch/service: Army of the Duchy of Warsaw (1807–1813); Army of Congress Poland (1815–1831)
- Years of service: 1807–1831
- Rank: Brigadier general
- Battles/wars: War of the Fourth Coalition; War of the Fifth Coalition; French invasion of Russia; November Uprising

Piotr Szembek (Polish: [ˈpjɔtr ˈʂɛm.bɛk]; 14 December 1788 – 21 March 1866) was a military officer and count. He served in the Army of the Duchy of Warsaw during the Napoleonic Wars, including the War of the Fourth Coalition, the War of the Fifth Coalition, and the French invasion of Russia. Later he served in the Army of Congress Poland, where he rose to the rank of brigadier general. From 1830 to 1831, he was a commander in the Polish insurgent forces during the November Uprising.

== Biography ==
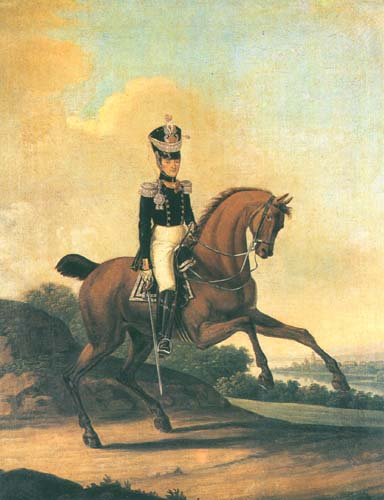
The 1832 painting by Józefat Ignacy Łukasiewicz, depicting Piotr Szembek, then a colonel in Polish insurgent forces during the November Uprising.

Piotr Szembek was born on 14 December 1788 in Warsaw, Polish–Lithuanian Commonwealth (now part of Poland). He came from noble family, and was a son of Józef Ignacy Szembek and Kunegunda Szembek (née Walewska). He was home-schooled, and later graduated from the Berlin Knight Academy in 1806. Since 1807, he served in the Army of the Duchy of Warsaw, where he rose to the rank of the captain. Szembek fought in the War of the Fourth Coalition, the War of the Fifth Coalition, and the French invasion of Russia. Since 1815, he served in the Army of Congress Poland, where he was promoted to the rank of brigadier general in 1829. From 24 May 1829 to 24 January 1831, he commanded the 3d Brigade of the 1st Infantry Division, based in Sochaczew.

In 1813, he married Fryderyka Henrietta (Henryka) Bécu de Tavernie. Together they had a son, Aleksander Szembek.

On 17 January 1816, he received the title of count in the Kingdom of Prussia. In 1820, the title was also approved in Congress Poland.

Following the outbreak of the November Uprising, Szembek joined the insurgent forcess, becoming the commander of the 4th Infantry Division. He fought in the First Battle of Wawer and the Battle of Olszynka Grochowska. He was also a member of the War Council, and the military gubernator of Warsaw from 4 to 16 December 1830. Szembek was considered very loyal to the uprising by his compatriots. One of his aides-de-camp was Franciszek Kacper Fornalski.

Szembek came into conflict with general Jan Zygmunt Skrzynecki, who was the Commander-in-Chief of the uprising. He was subsequently dismissed from the army. Despite that, Szembek continued fighting as a volunteer, serving under general Jan Kanty Julian Sierawski. After Skrzynecki was dismissed himself, Szembek was reinstated to the army, with the rank of division general.

Following the end of the uprising, he settled in the village of Siemianice.

In 1835 he was punished by the authorities of the Russian Empire for his participation in the uprising, in form of having his property confiscated.

Szembek was also member of the masonic lodge of Français et Polonais Réunis.

He died on 21 March 1866 in Siemianice.

== Commemorations ==
He became the namesake of the Szembek Square, in Warsaw, Poland, opened in 1919. It is located in the district of Praga-South. The nearby Szembek Market was also named after him. Additionally, he is the namesake the General Piort Szembek 374th Primary School, located in Warsaw, at 6 Boremlowskiej Street.

He was also the pathron of the 4th Mechanized Brigade of the Polish Armed Forces, from 1996 to 1999.

== Awards and decorations ==
- 4th class War Order of Virtuti Militari (1809)
- 3rd class War Order of Virtuti Militari (1810)
- 5th class National Order of the Legion of Honour (1813)
- 4th class Order of Saint Vladimir (1816)
- 2nd class Order of Saint Anna (1819)
- 2nd class Order of Saint Stanislaus (1829)
- Badge of Honour for 20 Years of Service (1830)
- Saint Helena Medal (1857)
- 2nd class Order of the Red Eagle (1861)
