= Antoni Blank =

Polish painter (1785–1844)

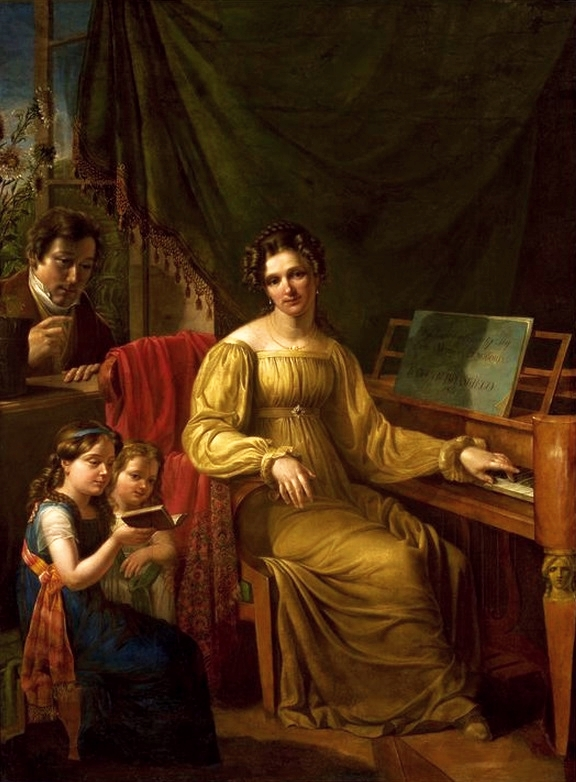
Self-portrait with Family (1825)

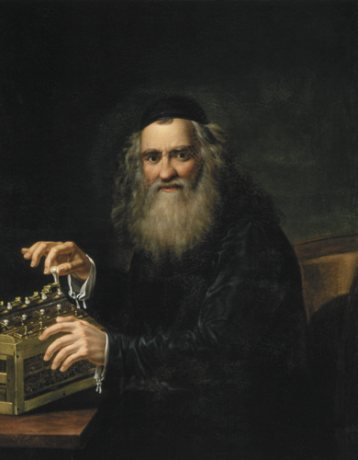
Portrait of Abraham Stern (1823)

Jan Antoni Blank (6 May 1785 – 20 February 1844) was a Polish painter in the Classical style who specialized in portraits and miniatures; many of which are in a style similar to Biedermeier. He often signed his paintings as Jan Antoni Blank-Białecki

== Biography ==
He was born in Olsztyn to the owner of a textile factory, but was orphaned at an early age and raised by the local postmaster. At the age of fifteen, he was apprenticed to Józef Kosiński, who had been a court painter for King Stanisław II August. He remained in Warsaw until 1809, when he moved to Dresden, where he studied with the Austrian painter, Josef Grassi.

Upon returning to Warsaw in 1815, he became curator of the plaster casts and drawing teacher of the Faculty of Fine Arts at the University of Warsaw. In 1819, he was appointed a professor. After the university was closed in 1831, he gave private lessons and did restorative work.

In addition to his portraits, Blank created works on religious and mythological subjects and did ceiling frescoes. Together with his students, he painted decorations at churches throughout Warmia; including Reszel, where he did an altar painting of Saint Catherine, and Saint James Cathedral in Olsztyn, where he painted "Our Lady of Sorrows". He also organized exhibitions in the Palaces of Nieborów and Królikarnia.

His most notable portraits are those of Abraham Stern, Stanisław Kostka Potocki and General Jan Teodor Kobylański (1777–1851). Among his best known students were Rafał Hadziewicz, Jan Feliks Piwarski, Antoni Brodowski and January Suchodolski.

Blank died in 1844, in Warsaw.
