= Battle of Paneriai =

- Part of November Uprising
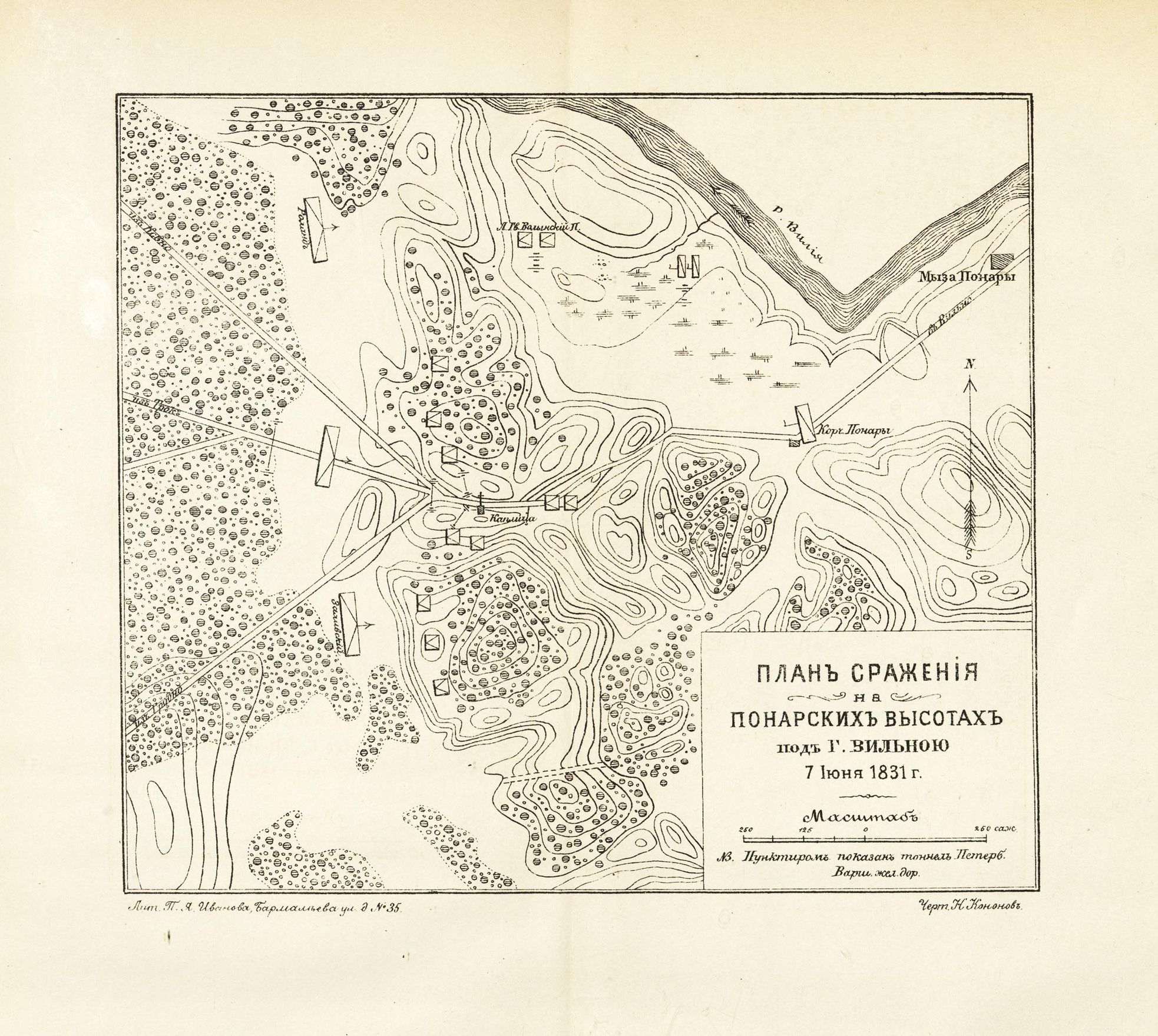
- Battle plan
Date	19 June [O.S. 7 June] 1831
Location	Aukštieji Paneriai, near Vilnius, Russian Empire (modern-day Lithuania)
Result	Russian victory

Belligerents
Russia	Congress Poland

Commanders and leaders
(Russian Empire) Dmitri Osten-Sacken	Antoni Giełgud; Francis Rolland

Strength
24,000, 70 cannons	24,000, 26 cannons

Casualties and losses
364	1,200 dead, wounded, captured, or missing 800 deserted

The Battle of Paneriai (Lithuanian: Panerių mūšis; Polish: Bitwa pod Ponarami; Russian: Сражение на Понарских высотах), also known as Battle of Vilnius, was one of the most important events of the November Uprising, when on June 19, 1831, Giełgud's corps was defeated by Osten-Sacken's men near Vilnius, ending the war in Lithuania.

== Background ==
Starting in 1831, uprisings in support of the Poles spread throughout Lithuania, but the latter could not strike with all their might in this region after the defeat near Ostrołęka.

Therefore, only Giełgud went on an expedition to Vilna with 12,000 men.

== Actions in Lithuania ==
In Lithuania, another 12,000 rebels joined the Poles. However, Giełgud made several mistakes and delayed the attack. As Russian reinforcements managed to arrive in Vilnius, they lined up at the front and took up convenient defensive positions, the forces were equal: 24,000 rebels against 24,000 Russians.

== The place of battle ==
The Russians took up quite strong positions, but they were narrow and it was impossible to deploy enough troops, the escape routes were also blocked, which means that the slightest failure would lead to disaster.

== Battle ==
Giełgud's inept command led to inconsistencies along the entire front, instead of a joint attack, the Poles engaged in battles in parts, the infantry attacked before the artillery deployed and suffered heavy losses.

The roundabout measures also failed, Rolland stumbled upon the Russian guard and returned having lost part of the troops.

Russian gradually turned to attacks, but the actions of the cavalry were not so successful, the cavalry battle ended with the victory of the Poles, and the Russian cavalry in a scattered form led them to the positions of the artillery, the battle could have been lost, but the infantry hit the main troops of Rolland in time, the Poles turned into a stampede.

The pursuit could not be organized due to the orders of the high command, although with it the entire corps of 20,000 could be exterminated. The main reason for the defeat of the Poles lay in the inability to conduct joint actions, while the Russians acted very harmoniously.

Giełgud reached the Prussian border and wanted to cross it, but was killed by his own soldier: Lieutenant Skulski, who suspected Giełgud of treason.

== Aftermath ==
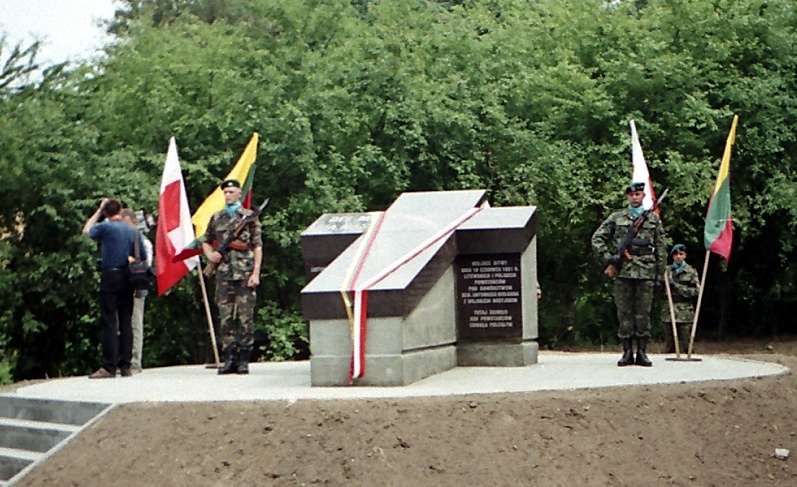
Monument to the battle

Polish-Lithuanian forces lost up to 2,000, (incl. 1,200 KIA, WIA, POWs or MIA and 800 deserted) and Russian army lost only 364 men. Most of the Lithuanian rebels dispersed after the battle, which was a heavy defeat that put an end to the uprising in Lithuania.

== Bibliography ==
=== Russian-language sources ===
- Egorshina, O.; Petrova, A. (2023). История русской армии [The history of the Russian Army] (in Russian). Moscow: Edition of the Russian Imperial Library. ISBN 978-5-699-42397-2.
- Kernosovsky, Anton (1938). История русской армии [History of the Russian army] (PDF).
- Velichko, Konstantin I.; Novitsky, Vasily F.; Schwarz, Alexey V. von; Apushkin, Vladimir A.; Schoultz, Gustav K. von (1915). Военная энциклопедия [Military Encyclopedia] (in Russian). Vol. XVIII:Паукер - Порт-Артур. Moscow: Типография Т-ва И. Д. Сытина.

=== Polish-language sources ===
- Kozłowski, Eligiusz; Wrzosek, Mieczysław (1984). Historia oręża polskiego 1795-1939 (in Polish). Warsaw: Wiedza Powszechna. ISBN 83-214-0339-5.
