= Olszynka Grochowska =

Area of Warsaw, Poland

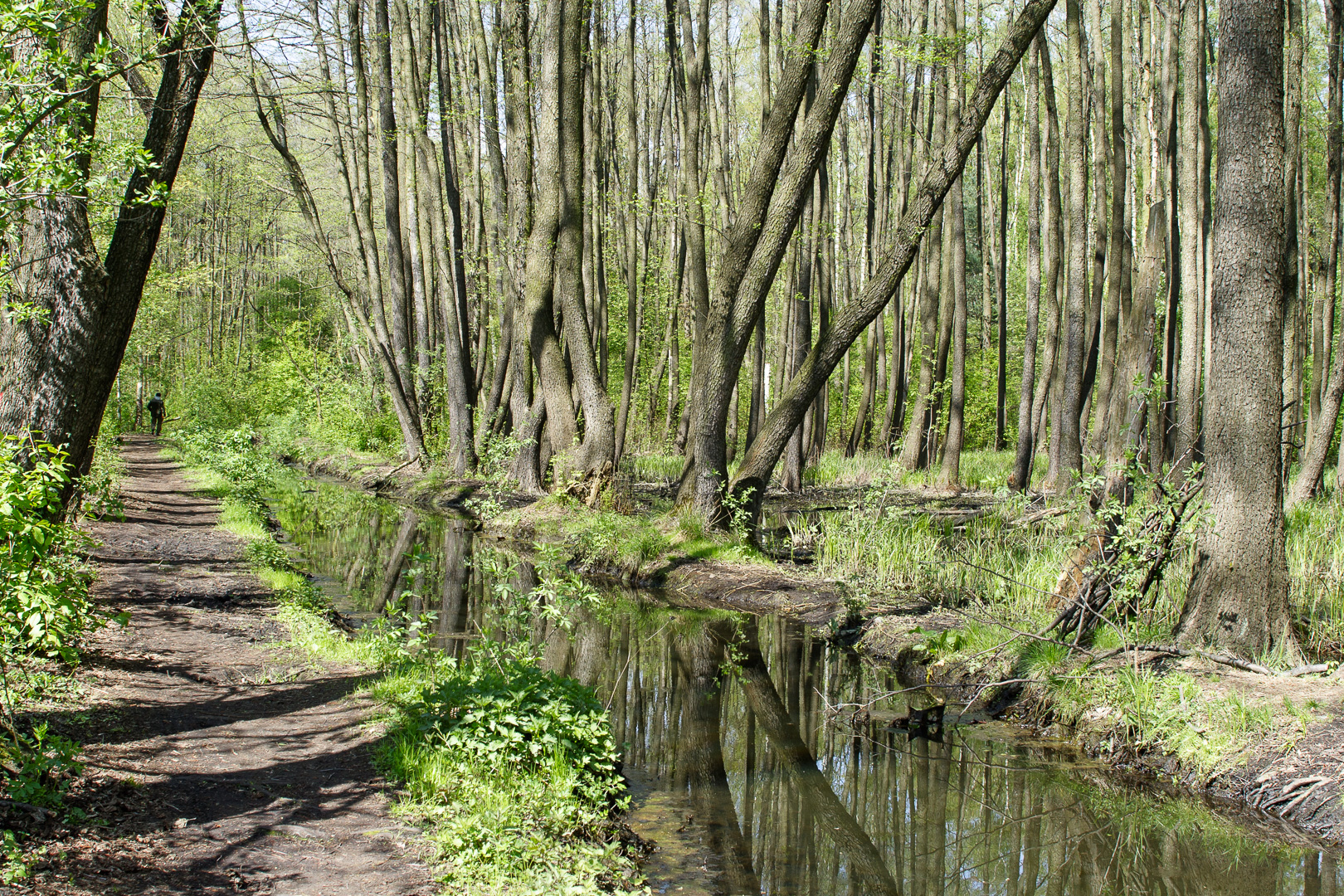
- Olszynka Grochowska Nature Reserve

- Location within Warsaw Location within Poland
- Coordinates: 52.25014°N 21.10574°E
- Country: Poland
- Voivodeship: Masovian
- County/City: Warsaw
- District: Praga-Południe
- Time zone: UTC+1 (CET)
  - Summer (DST): UTC+2 (CEST)

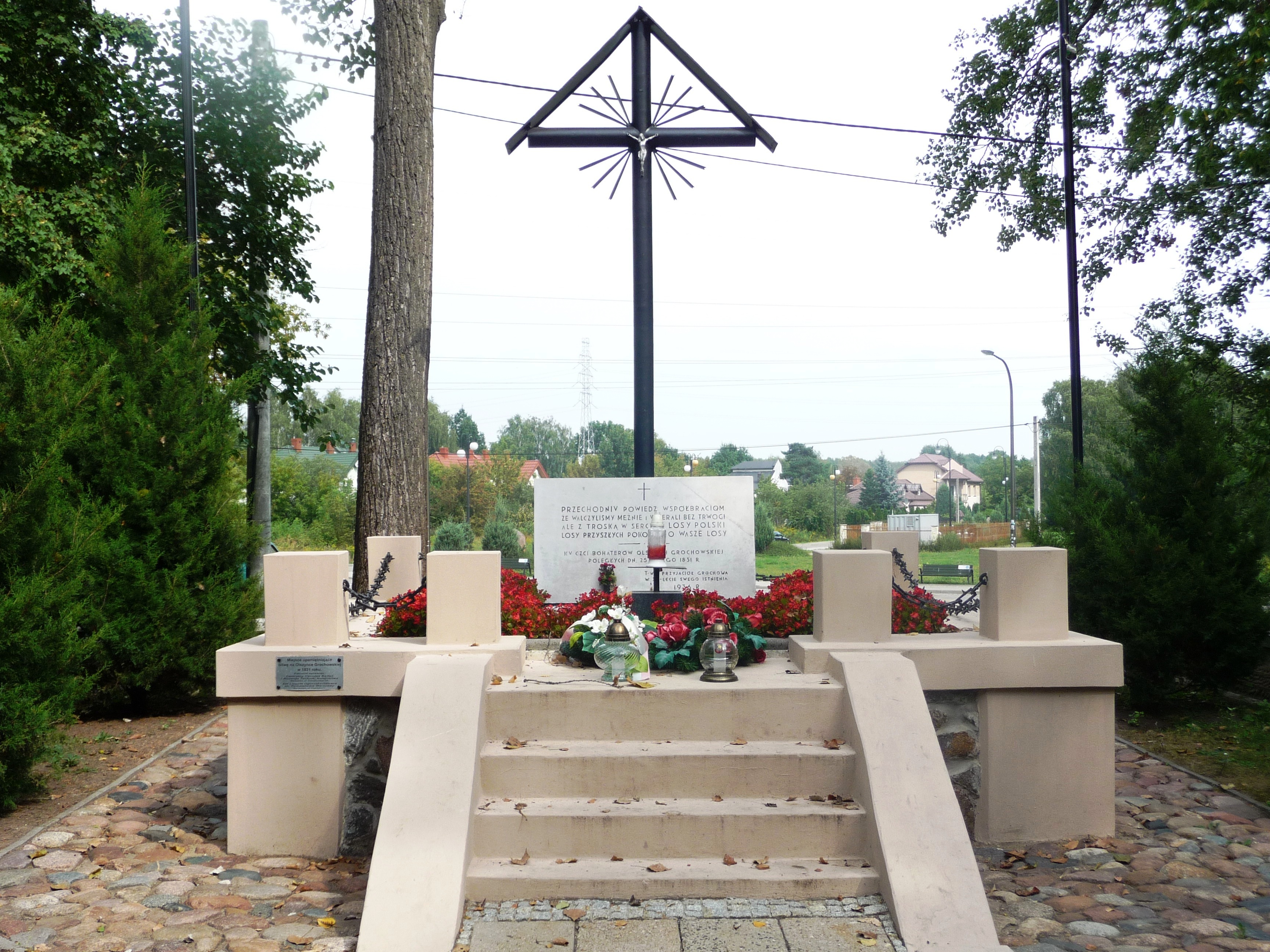
Monument to the Battle of Olszynka Grochowska

Olszynka Grochowska is a subdistrict located in the northern part of Praga-Południe, in southeastern Warsaw. The subdistrict is primarily forested, but it also features a nature reserve and the railway station.

The area is historically significant as the site of the Battle of Olszynka Grochowska, which occurred on 25 February 1831 during the November Uprising.
