= Josef Grassi =

Austrian painter (1757–1838)

- Giuseppe Grassi
- Self-portrait, c. 1800
- Born: 22 April 1757; Vienna, Archduchy of Austria
- Died: 7 January 1838 (aged 80); Dresden, Kingdom of Saxony
- Education: Imperial and Royal Unified Academy of Fine Arts
- Father: Ottilio

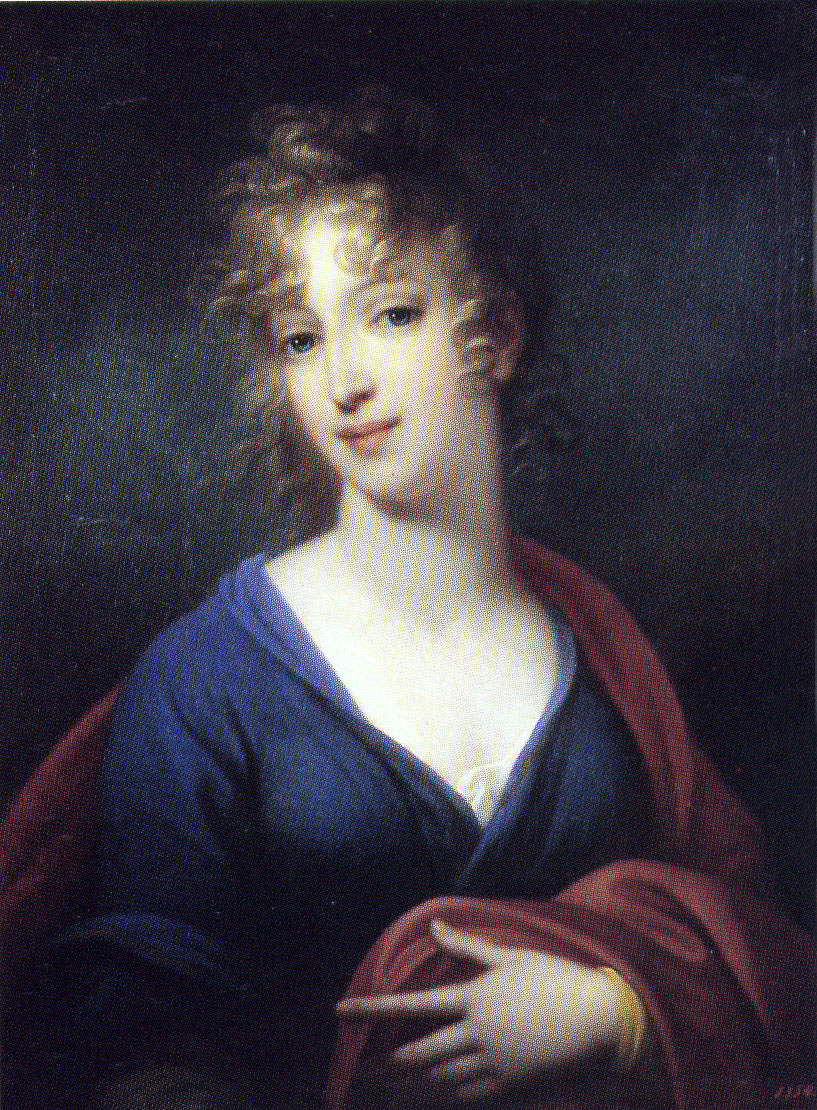
Grand Duchess Elena Pavlovna of Russia (1802)

Josef Grassi (22 April 1757 – 7 January 1838) was an Austrian portrait and history painter. His middle name is usually given as Maria, although there is evidence that it was actually Mathias. He is also called Giuseppe Grassi.

== Life ==
Grassi was born in Vienna, the younger brother of sculptor and porcelain modeller Anton Grassi. Their father, Ottilio, was a goldsmith from Udine. Josef studied at the Imperial and Royal Unified Academy of Fine Arts. He felt that he was being unfairly treated there so, when he lost a competition for a travel scholarship to Heinrich Friedrich Füger, he took the advice of some friends who were Polish nationalists and moved to Warsaw. There, he became a teacher of Teresa Jabłonowska (a descendant of Stanisław Jan Jabłonowski) and established himself as a successful portrait painter. When the Kościuszko Uprising broke out in 1794, he was able to leave the battle zone through the mediation of Kościuszko, whose portrait he had painted.

In 1799, Grassi was appointed a Professor at the Dresden Academy of Fine Arts. He took two leaves of absence while there; one to Gotha in 1804, where he decorated a bedroom for Duke Augustus and, from 1808 to 1810, to Rome as a member of the Accademia di San Luca. From 1816 to 1821, he was in Rome again, serving as the "Director of Studies for Saxon Artists in Italy". At that time, however, the Nazarene movement came into vogue and his work was ignored, so he returned to Dresden. He received the Knight Grand Cross of the Civil Order of Saxony from King Frederick Augustus.

Grassi is best known for his sensitive portraits of women. In his later years, his style became less graceful and settled into a form of academic classicism. He died in Dresden, aged 80.
