= Jan Krukowiecki =

Polish general (1772–1850)

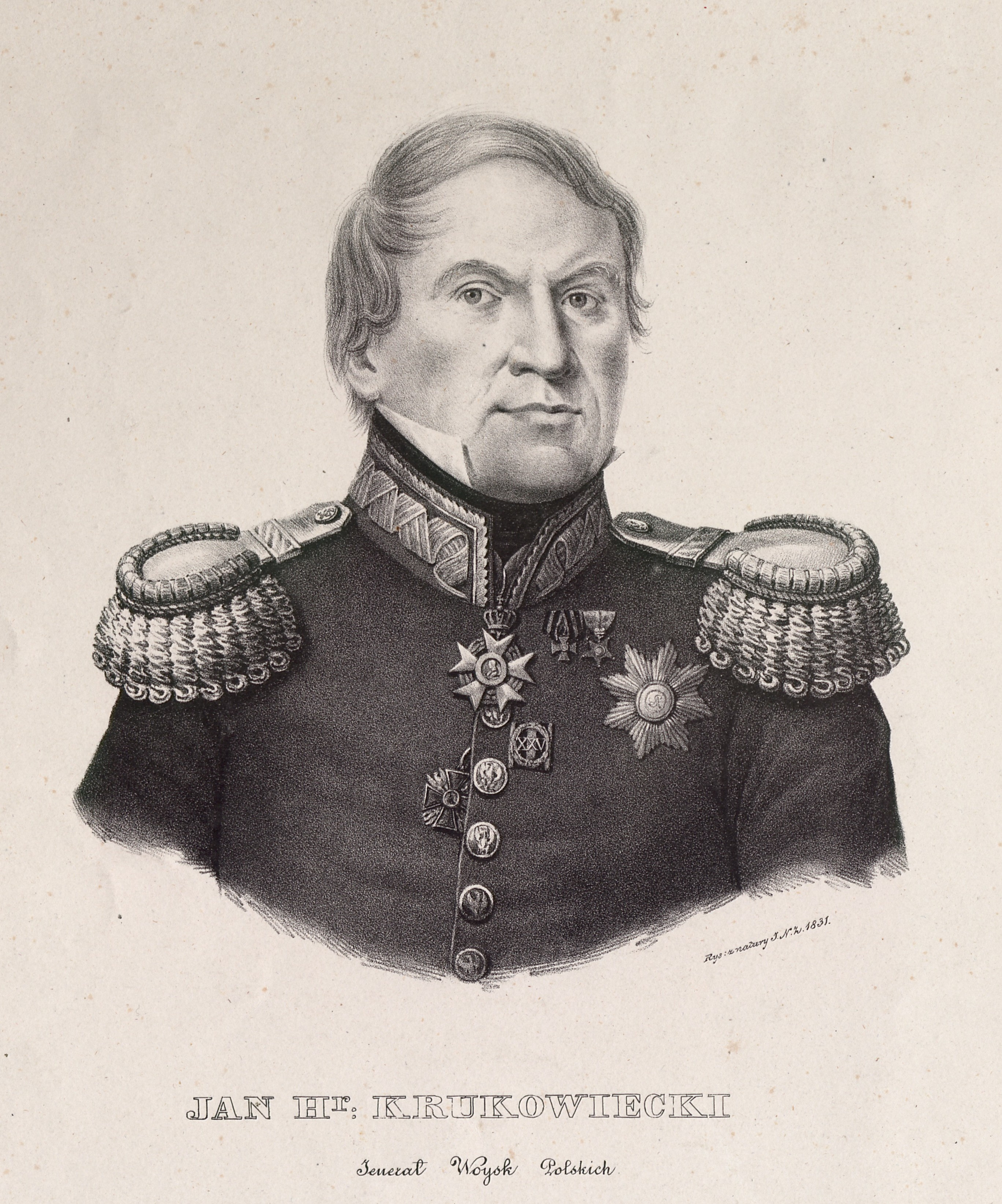
Jan Krukowiecki

Count Jan Stefan Krukowiecki (Polish pronunciation: [ˈjan krukɔˈvjɛt͡skʲi]; 1772–1850) was a Polish general and chairman of the Polish National Government (prezes Rządu Narodowego) during the November Uprising and general during Napoleonic Wars fighting in the troops of Napoleon.

== Early life and education ==
Jan Krukowiecki was born on 15 December 1772 in Lwów. He studied at the Theresianum in Vienna and joined the Austrian army.

== Military career ==
Krukowiecki fought in the campaigns against Turkish troops in the Balkans during the 6th Austro-Turkish War (1788-1791). In September 1794 Krukowiecki protested against the Austrian Habsburg monarchy response to the March–November 1794 Kościuszko Uprising by the Polish–Lithuanian Commonwealth and resigned his officer's commission. He spent the next 12 years in retirement.

In 1806 Krukowiecki joined the French army and fought in Napoleon's campaigns. In 1812 he was part of the Napoleon's army in the war against Russia. He was wounded at Smolensk and received the Legion of Honour, was promoted to general of brigade and took command of a cavalry brigade. At the battle of Leipzig he fought under general Sokolnicki but failed to secure the Halle Gate.

On 1 March 1814 Krukowiecki received command of the Polish guard of honor at Versailles. In 1814 Tsar Alexander I commissioned Krukowiecki to go to England because of his knowledge of the language. He was to secure the reparations of Polish prisoners of war. When he returned to Paris, he saw that his conduct in Leipzig was questioned in a public pamphlet. He sued general Sokolnicki, who had written the pamphlet under a pseudonym, but lost.

Krukowiecki proceeded to report to the Tsar and arrived in Moscow in February 1815 before he returned to Paris. On 16 April the same year, during a banquet in honor of Russian and Polish officers, he stomped on Sokolnicki's toe. He was subjected to a court martial but when Sokolnicki died in September 1816, Krukowiecki was merely removed from active army service and returned to Poland.

In August 1831 Krukowiecki became head of Polish government during the November Uprising, but had to surrender Warsaw to the Russians in September and was sent to Siberia. When he returned to Poland where he was tried for treason but acquitted. Krukowiecki settled on his wife's estate at Popień, near Rogowo, where he died on 17 April 1850.

== Honours and awards ==
- Knight's Cross of the Virtuti Militari
- Order of the Two Sicilies
- Order of St. Vladimir, Third Class
- Commander of the Legion of Honour
- Order of Saint Stanislaus, 2nd class
