= Uhlan =

Type of light cavalry originating in Central and Eastern Europe

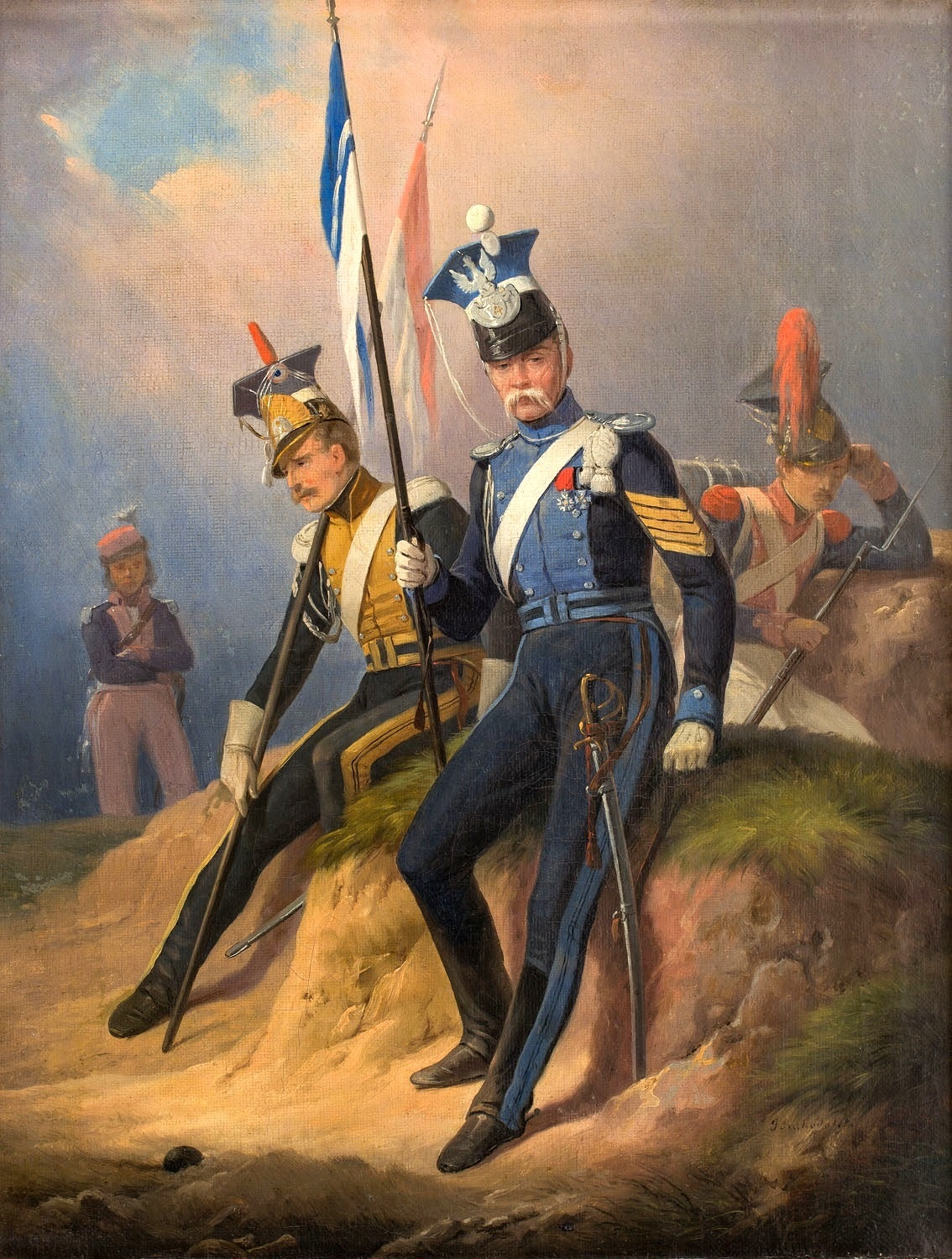
Polish uhlans from the army of the Duchy of Warsaw, 1807–1815, January Suchodolski painting

An uhlan (/ˈuːlɑːn, ˈjuːlən/; French: uhlan; German: Ulan; Lithuanian: ulonas; Polish: ułan) is a type of light cavalryman, primarily armed with a lance. The uhlans started with the Tartars in the Lithuanian irregular cavalry and were later also adopted by other countries during the 18th century, including Poland, France, Russia, Prussia, Saxony, and Austria. The term lancer was often used interchangeably with uhlan; the lancer regiments later formed for the British Army were directly inspired by the uhlans of other armies (even though they were never known by that name).

Uhlans traditionally wore a double-breasted short-tailed jacket with a coloured plastron panel at the front, a coloured sash, and a square-topped Polish lancer cap (rogatywka, also called czapka). This cap or cavalry helmet was derived from a traditional Polish cap design, formalised and stylised for military use. Their lances were traditionally topped with a small, swallow-tailed flag (pennon) just below the spearhead.

== Etymology ==
There are several suggested etymologies for the word uhlan. In the Turkic languages, oğlan means "young man" or "boy". It is probable that this entered Polish via Tatar and was styled as ułan. The Polish spelling was then adopted by German, French, and other European languages.

== History ==
=== Origins ===
Uhlans frequently adopted the practice of the original Lithuanian lancers of attaching pennons to lances to look more awe-inspiring.

In the Polish army during the 16th century, a division developed between units of hussars who used a long lance, called in Polish drzewiec and later kopia, and units of light cavalry, known as Cossack cavalry, which used a short lance of the rohatyna type, also called in Polish a “small drzewiec”. The difference between them was significant. The former measured from 4.5 to 5.5 meters in length, while the latter ranged from 2.5 to 2.85 meters. The rohatyna was also used by units of medium-armored cavalry, the Pancerni, which evolved from the Cossack cavalry. In Lithuania, the rohatyna was commonly used by all kinds of cavalry, even in units of Petyhorcy, who also fought with a longer lance. Above all, however, it was employed by Tatar cavalry units, formed by the Tatars settled in Lithuania by the Grand Duke Vytautas, for whom it was the primary weapon, alongside a bow. All units of Polish-Lithuanian light cavalry were modeled on the art of war of the Crimean Tatars, with whom they mainly clashed throughout the 16th and 17th centuries, and used mainly bows alongside rohatyna.

The rohatyna was fitted with a blade shaped like an elongated leaf or a triangle, with a lateral barb bent downward. It usually had a colorful silk pennant attached. Unlike the kopia, it could be used to deliver blows not only couched under the arm, but also overhand and from a distance. Light cavalry also fought with a shorter (1.8–2.1 m) and more slender dzida (spear), likewise adopted from the Tatars.

The Great Northern War exposed the deep crisis of the Polish–Lithuanian Commonwealth as well as its military weakness. The reforms of the 1717 Silent Sejm reduced the size of the Polish–Lithuanian army, including the cavalry, yet they also became a stimulus for the emergence of a new formation of uhlans. Above all, they preserved a substantial proportion of cavalry, which continued to make up about half of the army, whereas in Western armies this share was much smaller. Secondly, they maintained the importance of the lance, which had disappeared in other armies. A short lance also began to be used by hussars, although the honorific name kopia, referring to the chivalric tradition, was still retained.

=== Electorate of Saxony ===
Augustus II the Strong, Elector of Saxony, and from 1697 also King of Poland, impressed by the military theories of Chevalier de Folard, who proclaimed the superiority of cold steel over firearms, and by observing the effectiveness of Tatar cavalry units in the Polish–Lithuanian army during the Tarnogród Confederation, mainly the one led by Aleksander Ułan, began to form cavalry similar units in the Saxon army. This was facilitated by the reduction in the size of the Polish army, which released many well-trained soldiers from military service. However, the first units of this kind began to be formed only toward the end of his reign. On 28 February 1735, during the struggle for the Polish throne against Stanisław Leszczyński, his successor Augustus III incorporated into his army the private Tatar light banners of Crown regimentarz Józef Potocki, who had defected to his side. He formed them into a regiment of uhlans; this was the first time the term appeared as the proper name of a separate military formation. In 1738, the Saxon Court Uhlan Regiment was established, commanded by Jakub Błędowski. Their expansion took place during the Silesian Wars. At the beginning of the 1750s, they numbered 402 officers and soldiers and were stationed within the territory of the Polish–Lithuanian Commonwealth.

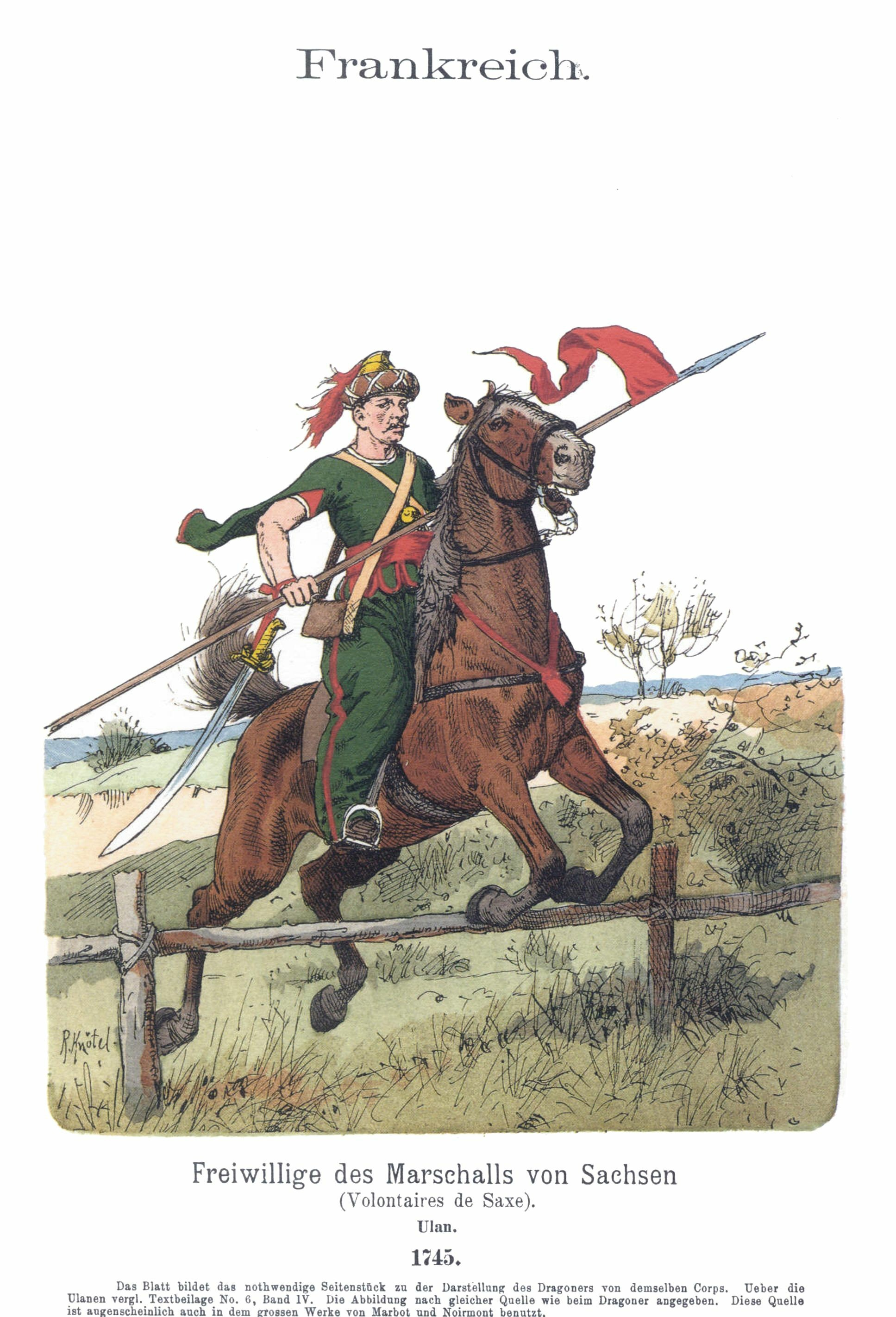
Uhlan of the "Volontaires de Saxe" in 1745

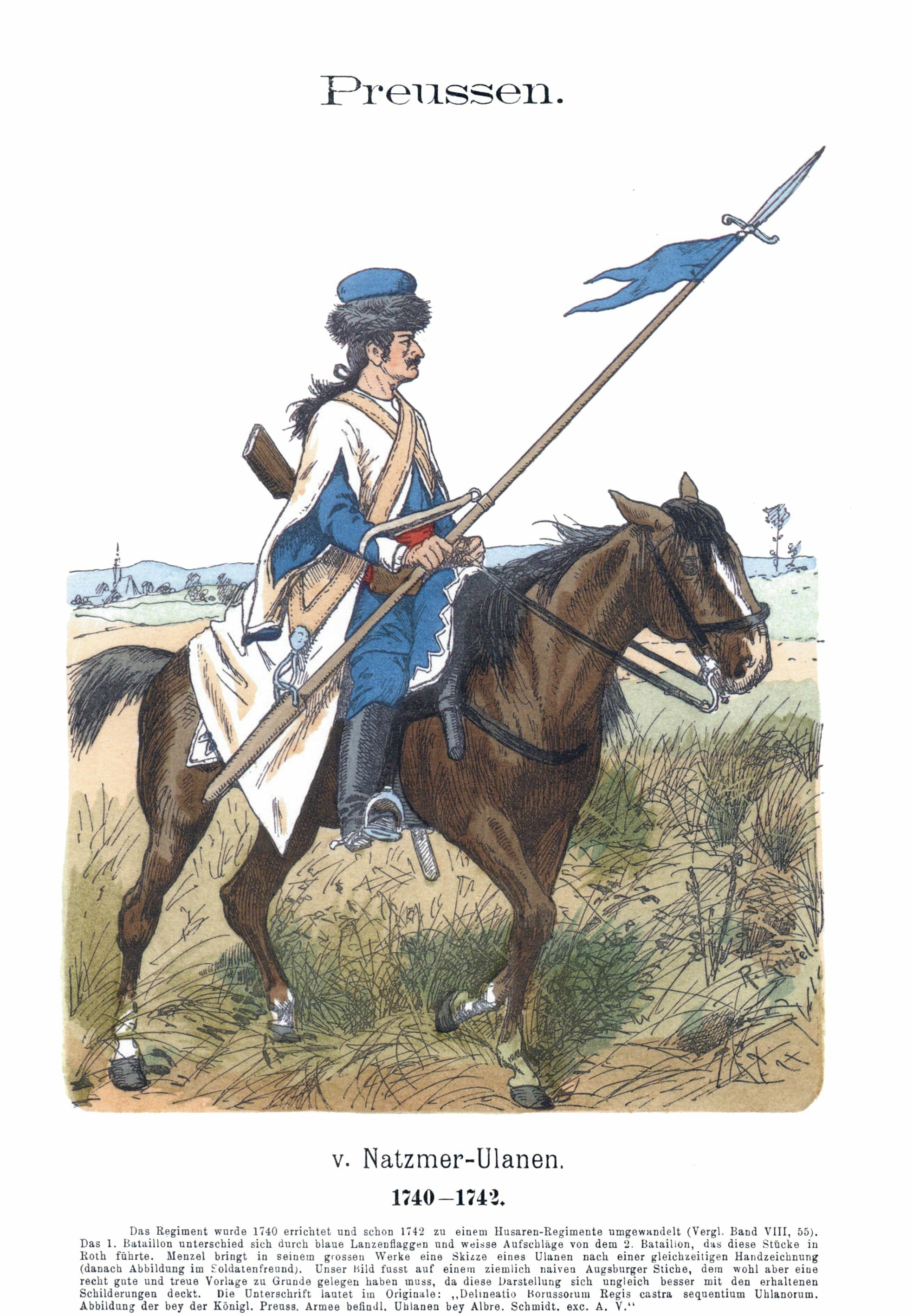
Uhlan of the Natzmer-Ulanen (1740–1742)

=== 18th century ===
Uhlan units started emerging in Western European armies during the War of Austrian Succession, starting with an uhlan squadron, known as the Natzmer Uhlanen, formed by Frederick the Great in 1740. The next year, the squadron was expanded to an uhlan regiment, finally being transformed into Natzmer's 4th Hussar Regiment in 1742.

Simultaneously, in 1743, Maurice de Saxe formed a mixed uhlan-dragoon regiment, the Volontaires de Saxe, for Louis XV's French Royal Army. It was composed of six companies, each of eighty dragoons and eighty uhlans, and included Lithuanian, Polish and Tatar soldiers. The regiment was known for its bravery, fighting spirit, and alcoholism.

The first uhlan regiments were created in the early 18th century, during the 1720s, in the Polish–Lithuanian Commonwealth.

As developments in battlefield tactics and firearms had combined with the increasing sizes of early modern armies to make heavy armour obsolescent (though retained by the cuirassier regiments), lighter units became the core of the cavalry, distinguished only by the sizes of their men and mounts and by the tasks that they performed (i.e., reconnaissance, skirmishing, or direct charges).

During the period preceding the Partitions of Poland, uhlan formations consisting of Poles or Lithuanian Tatars were created in most surrounding states simply because the Polish Crown did not have the resources or political will to maintain a numerous army. Speed and mobility were the keys to the effectiveness of light cavalry armed with lances.

King Stanisław August Poniatowski of Poland formed a regiment of royal guards equipped with lances, szablas, and pistols, each guardsman uniformed in kurtka and czapka. This unit became the prototype for many other units of the Polish cavalry, who started to arm themselves with equipment modelled after uhlan regiments and medieval Tatars.

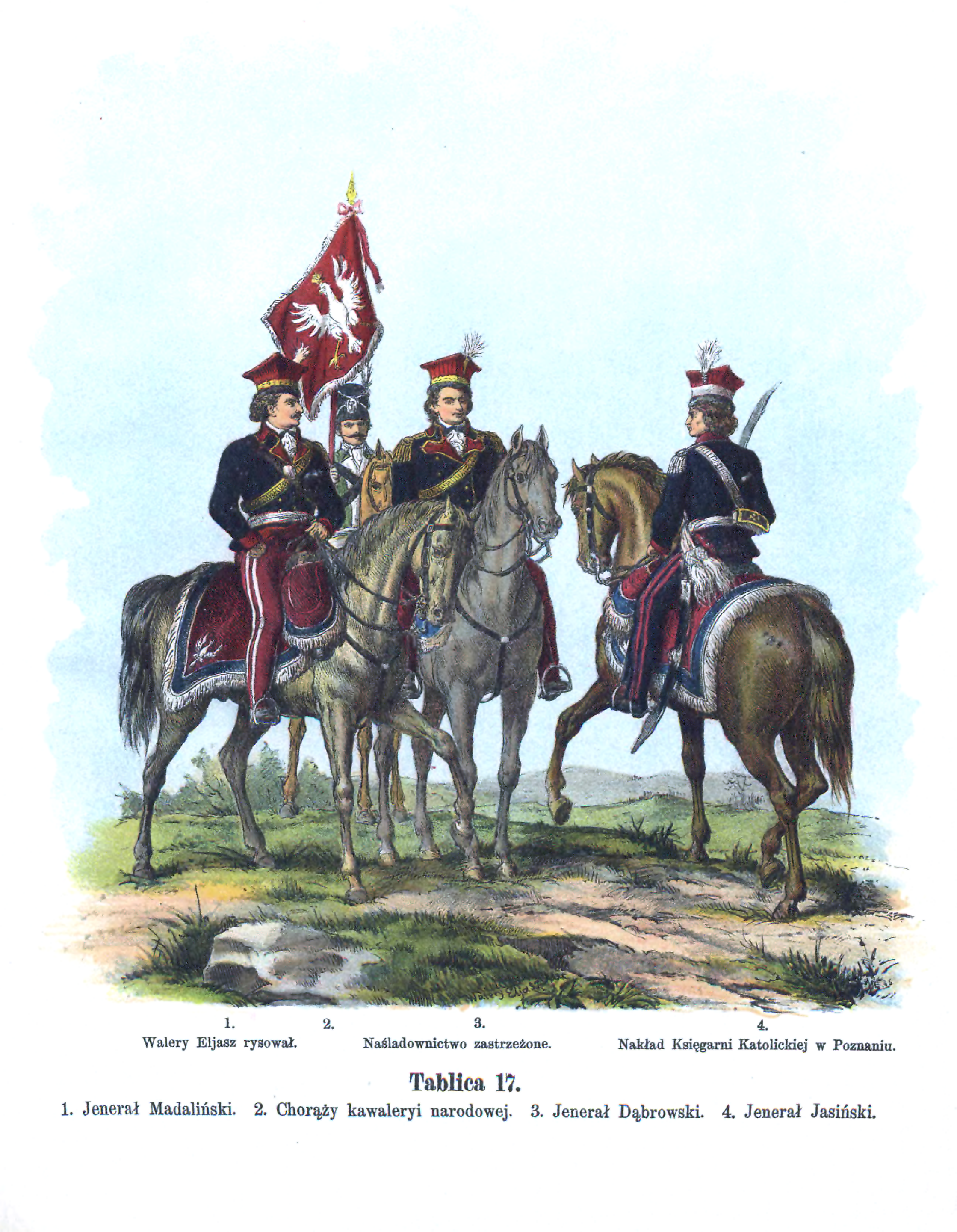
Polish uhlans of the Kościuszko Uprising in 1794 – Walery Eljasz Radzikowski

In 1775, the Polish–Lithuanian Commonwealth established the National Cavalry by reorganising the existing hussar and pancerni cavalry banners. This reform modernised the cavalry of the national contingent while preserving elements of its earlier organisational traditions. The Austrian empire also formed an "Uhlan Regiment" in 1784, composed primarily of Poles. Uhlan regiments recruited from Austrian cavalrymen were raised in 1791.

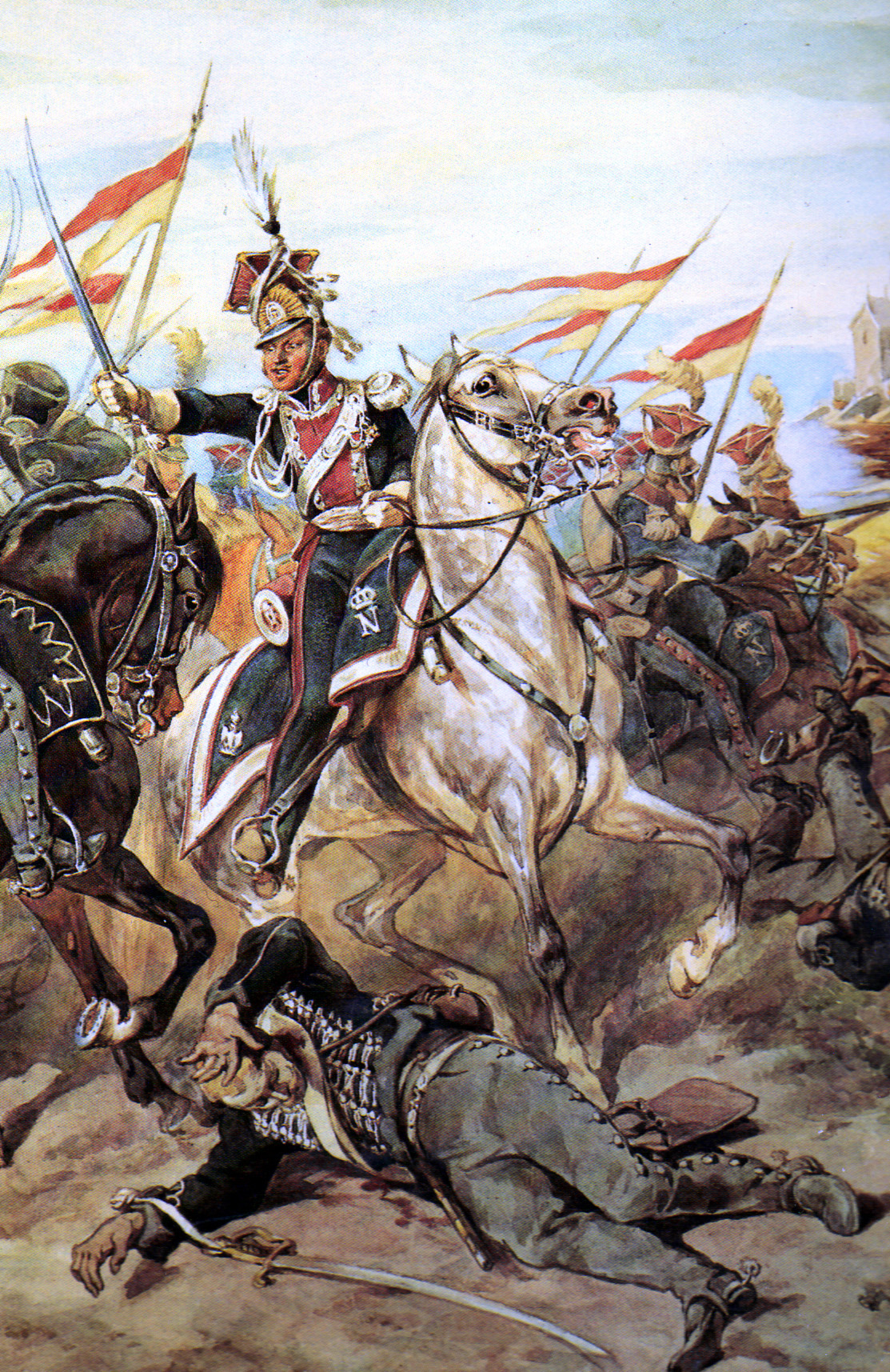
Polish chevaulegers of the Imperial Guard in the Battle of Peterswalde – Juliusz Kossak

=== 19th century ===
During the Napoleonic Wars, the Duchy of Warsaw raised uhlan formations. Polish lancers serving with the French Army included the Legion of the Vistula and the 1st Polish Light Cavalry Regiment of the Imperial Guard. The Imperial Guard lancers were armed with lances, sabres and pistols. The lancers of the Polish expeditionary corps, which fought alongside the French in Spain and Germany, spread the popularity of the Polish model of light cavalry. After the Battle of Somosierra, Napoleon said that one Polish cavalryman was worth ten French soldiers. The chevaux-légers, French light cavalry units from the 16th century till 1815, were remodelled after the uhlans. Following the Treaty of Tilsit in 1807, lancer regiments designated as uhlans were reintroduced in the Prussian service. Initially, they were only three. After the War of the Sixth Coalition, uhlan regiments were formed from Lützow Free Corps, Schill Free Corps, Bremen Volunteers and Hellwig's Streifkorps.

During and after the Napoleonic Wars, cavalry regiments armed with lances were formed in many states throughout Europe, including the armies of Italy, Spain, Portugal, Sweden and Russia. While cavalry carrying this weapon was usually specifically designated as lancers or uhlans, in some instances, the front rank troopers of hussar or dragoon regiments were also armed with lances.

In one notable action during the Waterloo Campaign as the French lancers advanced out of a defile — created by the bridge over the Dyle and the village of Genappe — although they were stationary as they formed up, they lowered their lances to receive a charge by the sabre wielding British 7th Hussars (light cavalry) who were then unable to press home their charge. However, once the lancers advanced in slight disorder (up the valley slope of the Dyle), they were overridden by the British 1st Life Guards (heavy cavalry armed with sabres) who drove them back through Genappe and onto the bridge.

During the Battle of Albuera, the 1st Vistulan Lancers Regiment in French service inflicted heavy casualties on three of four of the British infantry regiments comprising John Colborne's 1st Brigade. In 1816, the British Army established its own lancer regiments, converting four light dragoon regiments for the purpose and practically adopting the whole uniform of Napoleon's famous Polish Lancers, including the czapska.

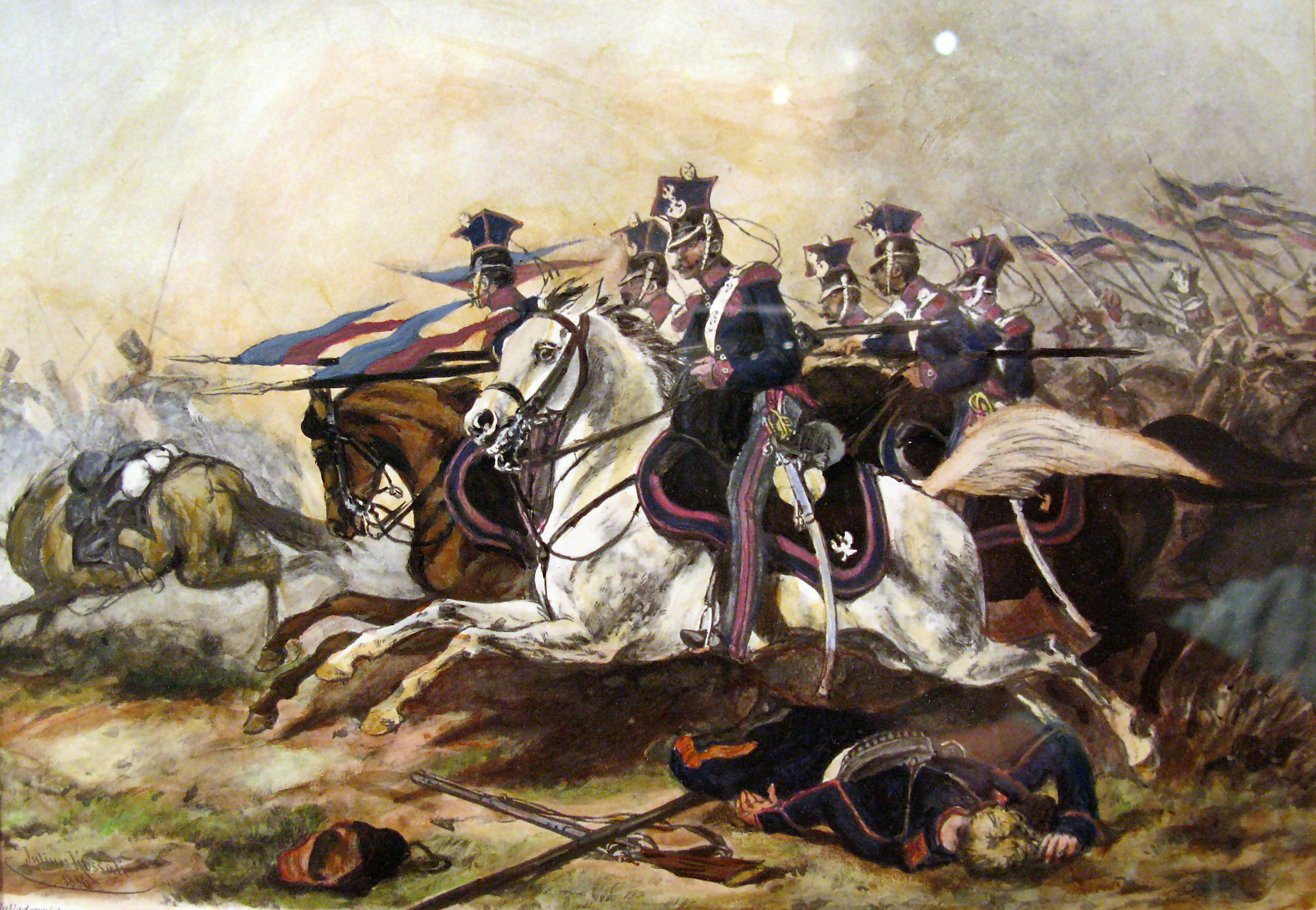
Charge of the Poznań Cavalry Regiment at the Battle of Rajgród during the November uprising of 1831

The traditions of the Polish uhlans were preserved during the Kingdom of Poland. They fought both in the November uprising of 1830 and in the January uprising of 1863. Uhlans were deployed in the Franco-Prussian War by the Prussian Army in a variety of traditional light cavalry roles. During the siege of Paris, uhlans were tasked with shadowing passenger balloons launched from the city: their capacity for rapid movement made uhlans the only troops able to keep pace with the balloons, either to seize them on landing or at least report trajectory and destination.

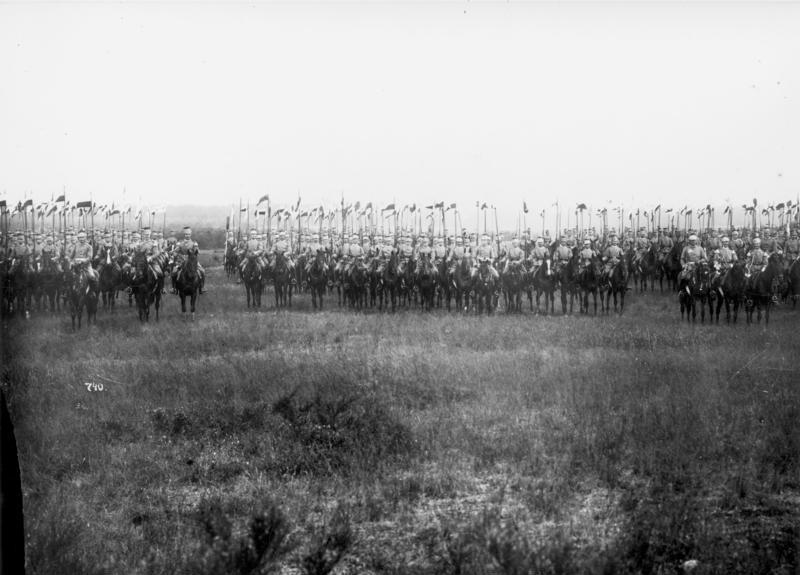
Prussian Guard Uhlans about 1912

=== World War I ===
At the start of the First World War, many European armies had lance-armed cavalry regiments. Belgium had five lancer regiments. Italy possessed 10 lancer regiments. The British army had six lancer regiments, with an additional 15 in the British Indian Army.

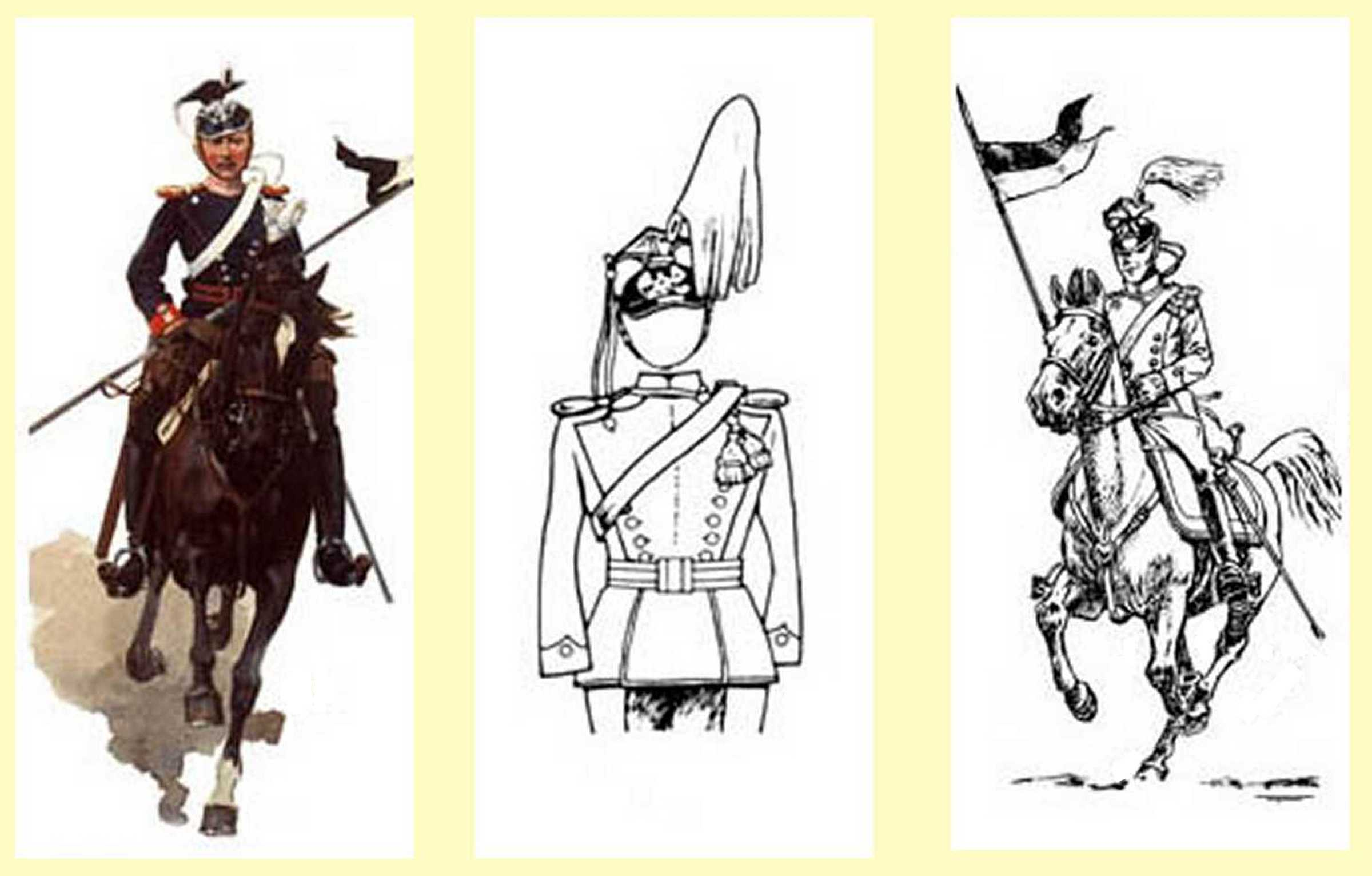
Prussian uhlans in pre-1914 uniform

==== German uhlans ====
In 1914, the Imperial German Army included 26 uhlan regiments, three of which were guard regiments, 21 line (16 Prussian, two from Württemberg and three Saxon) and two from the autonomous Bavarian army. All German uhlan regiments wore Polish-style czapkas and tunics with plastron fronts, both in coloured parade uniforms and the field grey service dress introduced in 1910. Because German hussar, dragoon and cuirassier regiments also carried lances in 1914, there was a tendency among their French and British opponents to describe all German cavalry as "uhlans".

The lance carried by the uhlans (and after 1889 the entire German cavalry branch) was known as the Stahlrohrlanze which consisted of a 3.18-metre-long (10 ft 5 in) tube made of rolled steel-plate, weighing 1.6 kg (3.5 lb). The lance carried below its head a small pennant in different colours according to the province or state from which the regiment was recruited. The quadrangular spear point was 30 cm (12 in) long and made of tempered steel. The butt end of the shaft was also pointed so that (in theory) the lance could be wielded as a double-ended weapon.

After seeing mounted action during the first few weeks of World War I, the uhlan regiments were either dismounted to serve as "cavalry rifles" in the trenches of the Western Front or they were transferred to the Eastern Front where the more primitive battle conditions made it possible for horse cavalry to fulfill their intended role. All 26 German uhlan regiments were disbanded in 1918–1919.

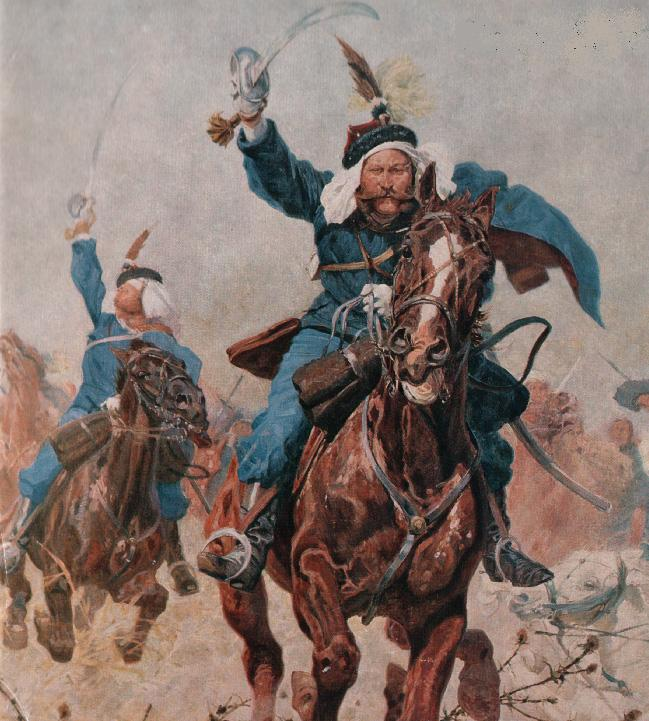
Charge of the Austrian 13th Galician Uhlan Regiment during the Battle of Custoza (1866)

==== Austrian uhlans ====
There were 11 regiments of uhlans (spelt "Ulan") in the Austro-Hungarian cavalry, largely recruited in the Polish-speaking parts of the Empire. They wore czapkas in regimental colours but otherwise were, after 1867, dressed in the light blue tunics and red breeches of the Austro-Hungarian dragoons, without Polish features. Their lances were similar in design to those of the German cavalry but had wooden shafts (of ash). In 1884 the lance was replaced by the sabre in the Austro-Hungarian cavalry, although the Ulan regiments retained their traditional titles and lancer caps until World War I.

As with other armies, the Austro-Hungarian uhlans were forced into a largely dismounted role by the realities of trench warfare by the end of 1914. Consequently, the blue and red peacetime uniforms were replaced by field grey during 1915. There was, however, one last opportunity for traditional glory when on 21 August 1914, the uhlans and dragoons of the Austro-Hungarian 4th Cavalry Division under Edmund Ritter von Zaremba clashed with the Russian 10th Cavalry Division under general Fyodor Arturovich Keller in classic cavalry style at the Battle of Jaroslavice.

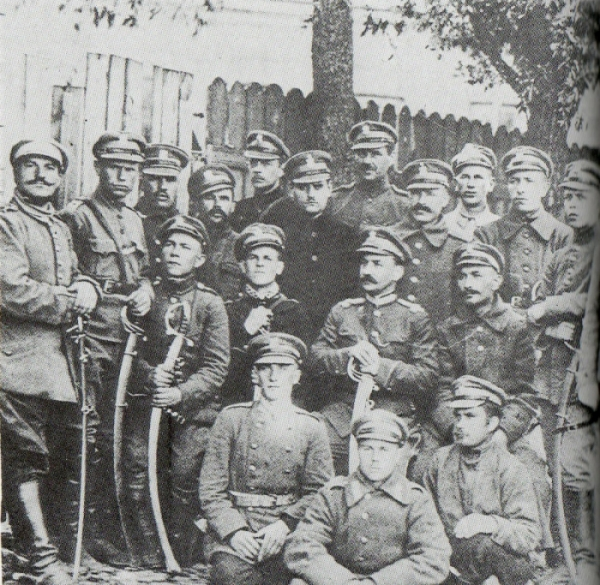
Tatar uhlans from Grodno area – soldiers of Polish Army in 1919

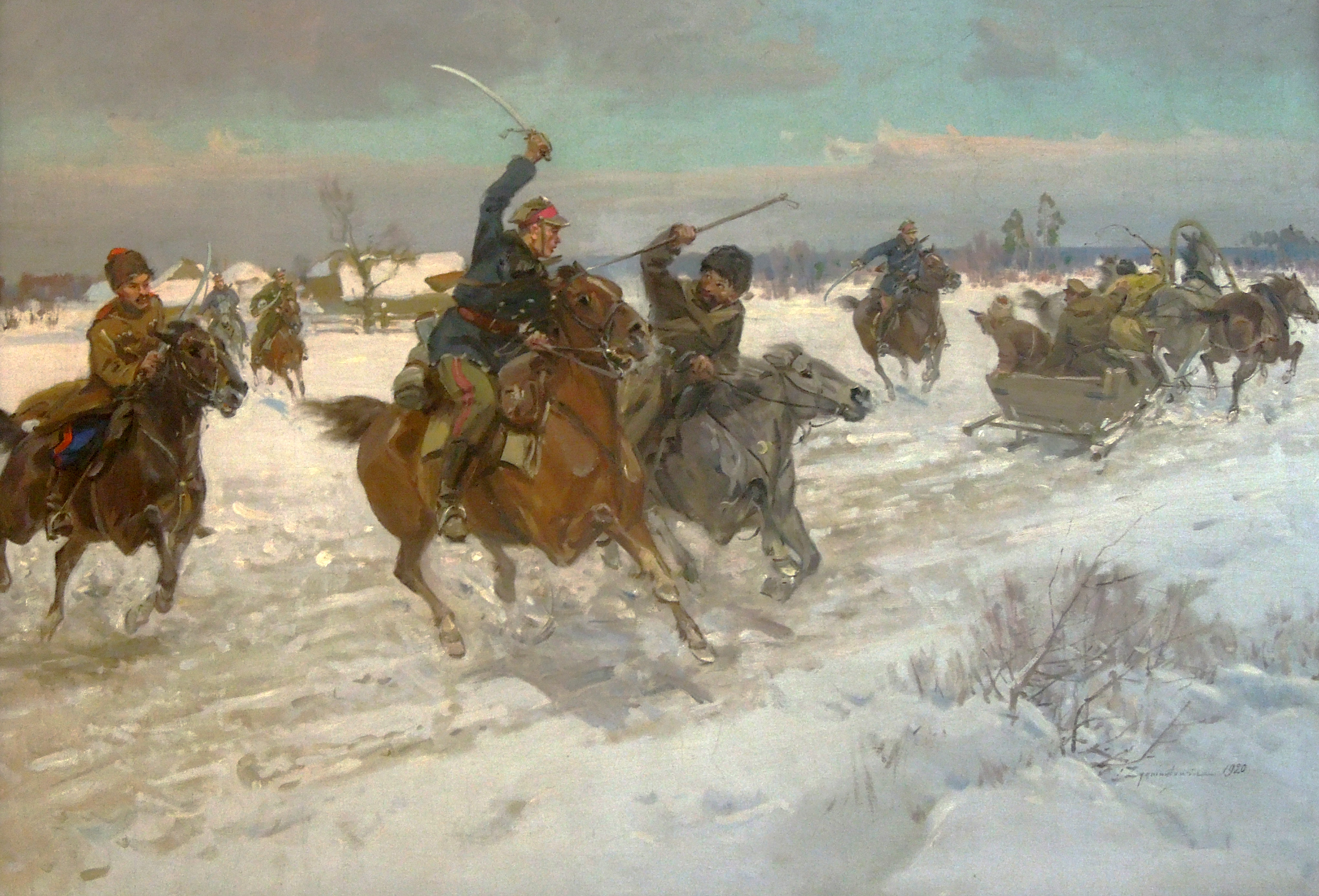
Polish uhlans during the Polish-Soviet War 1919–21, painted by Czesław Wasilewski, 1920s or 1930s

==== Polish uhlans ====
Józef Piłsudski's Polish Legions (an independent formation serving with the Austro-Hungarian Army) had a small uhlan detachment. Commanded by Władysław Belina-Prażmowski, they were modelled after the uhlans of the Napoleonic period. This unit was the first element of the Central Powers to enter Polish lands during World War I. After Poland's independence in 1918, all parts of the country raised uhlan formations. They fought with distinction in the Greater Poland Uprising, the Polish-Ukrainian War and the Polish-Bolshevik War. Although equipped with modern horse-drawn artillery and trained in infantry tactics, the uhlan formations kept their sabres, their lances and their ability to charge the enemy. Among other battles, the uhlan units took part in the Battle of Komarów of 1920 against the invading Soviet Konarmia, the last pure cavalry battle in history.

==== Russian uhlans ====
Private (Uhlan) of the 4th Kharkov Uhlan Regiment in full dress uniform until 1882

The Imperial Russian Army had converted its 17 line uhlan regiments to dragoons in 1881 as part of the general modernization of the Russian cavalry. Only the two Russian Imperial Guard uhlan regiments retained their special distinctions. In 1910, however, the historic line regiments of uhlans had their lances, traditional titles, and distinctive ceremonial uniforms returned to them. From 1910 to 1918, the designation of "uhlan" had, however, become simply a historical distinction in the Russian cavalry (many of whom carried lances), without tactical significance.

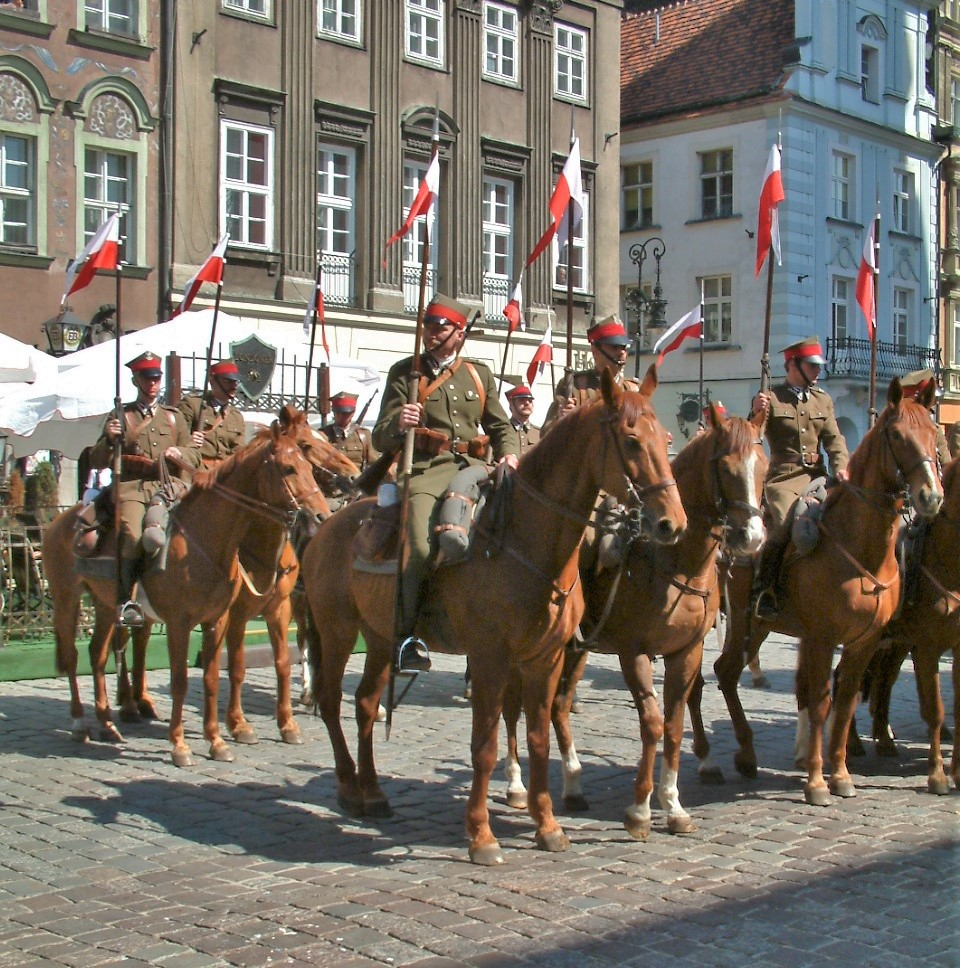
Volunteers recreating the 15th Poznań Uhlans Regiment in 1939 uniforms

=== Interwar ===
In the period between the World Wars, the Polish cavalry was reformed, with some units retaining their uhlan traditions. However, in contrast with its traditional role, the cavalry was no longer seen as a unit capable of breaking through enemy lines. Instead, it was used as a mobile reserve and employed infantry tactics: the soldiers dismounted before the battle and fought as infantry (dragoon), yet retained the high mobility of cavalry. Thus, technically speaking, in 1939, Poland had 11 brigades of mounted infantry and no cavalry units.

As noted above, the uhlans of the Imperial German Army were disbanded at the end of World War I. However, lances continued to be carried by certain cavalry regiments of the new German Army (Reichsheer) permitted by the Treaty of Versailles. As late as 1925, Major General von Seeckt, Commander of the Reichsheer, rejected a General Staff proposal that lances be abandoned as unsuited for a modern army.

=== World War II ===
While the Polish cavalrymen retained their sabres, the lance was no longer a standard issue after 1934 (or 1937). However, the lance was retained only for training purposes and flying squadron pennants. Instead, the cavalry units were equipped with 75mm field guns, light tanks, 37mm anti-tank guns, 40mm anti-aircraft guns, as well as anti-tank rifles and other modern weapons. Although there were cavalry charges during World War II, very few were successful.

A popular myth is that Polish cavalry armed with lances charged (and were annihilated by) German tanks during the September 1939 campaign. This arose from the misreporting (both intentional and unintentional) of the Charge at Krojanty on 1 September, when the 18th Pomeranian Uhlan Regiment's two squadrons armed with sabres, scattered German infantry before being caught in the open by German armoured cars.

When the remnants of the Polish cavalry forces were reconstituted in exile in 1943 as the 1st Armoured Division the 24th Uhlans (24 Pułk Ułanów) were equipped as an armoured regiment with Sherman tanks. The regiment was disbanded in 1947.

=== Modern ===
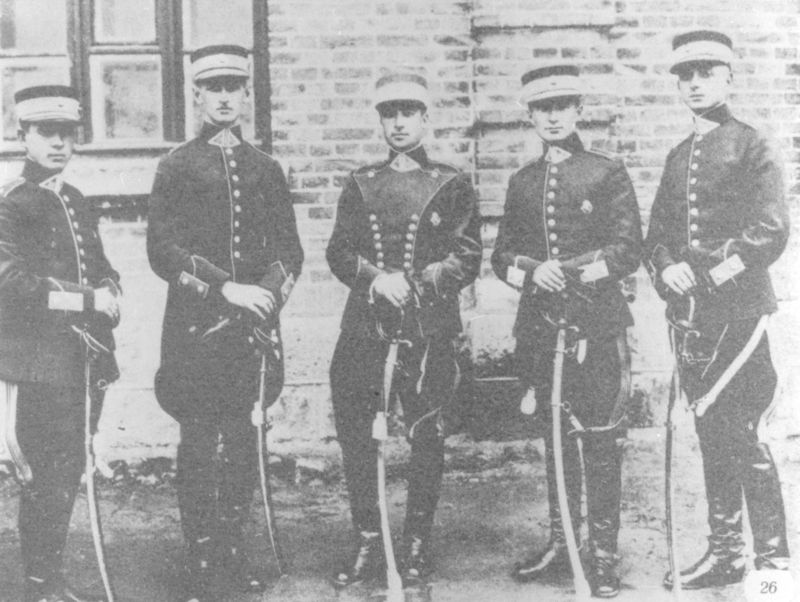
Lithuanian Army's uhlan officers in 1925

Present-day military units with the title or historical role of "uhlans" include:

- Poland: Presidential Mounted Cavalry Squadron of Polish Armed Forces (Polish: Szwadron Kawalerii Wojska Polskiego)
- Lithuania: Grand Duchess Birutė Uhlan Battalion (Lithuanian: Didžiosios kunigaikštienės Birutės ulonų batalionas) this unit has the historic title, but not the cavalry role. It is a combat battalion.

== In popular culture ==
=== Video games ===
- In Final Fantasy XII: The Zodiac Age, one of the 12 playable character classes is named "Uhlan" and wields Lances and Spears.
- Many light to medium Battlemech and combined arms regiments in the BattleTech/MechWarrior universe use uhlans in their unit names (e.g., the 1st Kathil Uhlans).
- Age of Empires III: uhlans are the primary cavalry unit of the German civilization.
- Mount & Blade: With Fire & Sword: A lance-armed light cavalryman called an "oglan" can be found in service of the Crimean Khanate.
- Total War: Empire features uhlans as a playable unit. They are armed with lances.

=== Literature and film ===
- Uhlans are mentioned in Arthur Conan Doyle's short story "The Lord of Chateau Noir".
- The 19th century German pulp-fiction novel Die Liebe des Ulanen (″The Uhlan's Love″) by Karl May.
- In Leo Tolstoy's seminal work War and Peace, uhlans appear several times from the start of Book III.
- In Guy de Maupassant's short story "Father Milon", 16 uhlan soldiers of the Prussian army are killed by the old protagonist, Father Milon.
- In Joseph Roth's 1932 novel The Radeztky March, the protagonist is an officer of the Austro-Hungarian uhlans.
- In the 1943 film The Life and Death of Colonel Blimp, Theo Kretschmar-Schuldorff is an officer of the uhlans.
- In Graham Greene's 1958 novel Our Man in Havana, Dr. Hasselbacher is an ex-uhlan officer.
- In Gunther Grass's 1959 novel The Tin Drum, the protagonist Oskar Matzerath frequently refers to the Polish uhlans as well as their misreported charge on 1 September 1939.
- In Italo Calvino's 1979 novel If on a winter's night a traveler, Gritzvi (Outside the town of Malbork) prizes his uhlan helmet and is reluctant to leave it in Ponko's care.
- In the science fiction short story He Walked Around the Horses by H. Beam Piper, Prussian uhlans play an important role, it is they who first meet the diplomat Benjamin Bathurst who had slipped from our world into an Alternative History timeline.
- Anton Hofmiller, the narrator of Stefan Zweig's Beware of Pity, is an officer in an uhlan regiment in 1913 Austria-Hungary.
- Battle Picture Weekly's popular feature "Charley's War", by Pat Mills & Joe Colquhoun, had uhlans playing a major role in episodes 252 & 253.
- In Star Trek the Romulan equivalent of an ensign is an uhlan.

=== Culture ===
- Traditional Polish and Ukrainian song Hej Sokoły.

=== Sports and organisations ===
- "Black Uhlan of the Rhine" – the nickname of a heavyweight champion Max Schmeling.
- Valparaiso University's sports teams were nicknamed "Uhlans" until World War II, then changed to "Crusaders".
- The Black Uhlans is the name of one of Australia's Outlaw motorcycle clubs that has been active since 1970.

== See also ==
- Hussar
- Lancer
- Polish cavalry
- Dragoon
- Cuirassier

== Bibliography ==
- Baczkowski, Michał (2011). Szarży podobnej dawno nie widziały dzieje! Ułani galicyjscy 1778–1918 [A Charge the Like of Which History Had Not Seen for a Long Time! Galician Uhlans, 1778–1918]. Kraków.
- Barrows, John Stuart (January 1916). "The Uhlans and Other Cavalry in the European War". Journal of the United States Cavalry Association. 26.
- Barthorp, Michael (1984). British Cavalry Uniforms Since 1660. Blandford Press. ISBN 0-7137-10438.
- Cornish, Nik; Karachtchouk, Andrei (2001), The Russian Army 1914-18, Oxford: Osprey Publishing, p. 13, ISBN 1-84176-303-9
- Funcken, Fred; Funcken, Lilianne (1967). Le costume et les armes des soldats de tous les temps (in French). Tournai: Casterman. ISBN 2-203-14303-7.
- Funcken, Fred; Funcken, Lilianne (1971). L'uniforme et les armes des soldats de la guerre 1914-1918 (in French). Vol. 2. Tournai: Casterman. ISBN 2-203-14309-6.
- Grbašić, Z.; Vukšić, V. (1989). The History of Cavalry. Facts on File. ISBN 0-8160-2187-2.
- Guchinova, Elza-Bair (2006). The Kalmyks. Great Britain: Routledge. ISBN 978-0-7007-0657-0.
- Haythornthwaite, Philip J. (1986). Uniforms of Waterloo in colour, 16-18 June 1815. Hong Kong: Blandford Press. ISBN 0713707143.
- Haythornthwaite, Phillip J. (2012). Austrian Army of the Napoleonic Wars. Vol. 2 (Cavalry). Bloomsbury Publishing. ISBN 9781782007036.
- Horne, Alistair (2007). The Fall of Paris. Penguin Books. pp. 129–130.
- Knötel, Richard; Knötel, Herbert; Sieg, Herbert (1980). Uniforms of the World. New York: Arms and Armour Press. ISBN 0-684-16304-7.
- Kucharski, Wiktor (1987). "Lance kawaleryjskie w zbiorach Muzeum Historycznego m. Krakowa na tle rozwoju drzewkowej broni kolnej" [Cavalry lances in the collections of the Historical Museum of the City of Kraków against the background of the development of polearms with hafted weapons]. Krzysztofory. 14.
- Lawford, James (1976). Cavalry - Techniques & Triumphs of the Military Horseman: The Stories of the Great Cavalry Regiments, their Commanders and celebrated Actions. Indianapolis: Bobbs-Merrill Company. ISBN 0-672-52192-X. LCCN 79-5986.
- Lucas, James (1987). Fighting Troops of the Austro-Hungarian Army 1868-1914. Hippocrene Books. ISBN 0-946771-04-9.
- Melegari, Vezio (1972). The World's Great Regiments. Netherlands. ISBN 0600338991.
- Picard, Louis Auguste (1897). L'armée en France et à l'étranger (in French). Tours.
- Rawkins, W.J. (1977). The Russian Army 1805 – 14. Anschluss Publishing.
- Roemer, Jean (1863). Cavalry; its history, management, and uses in war ... With illustrations. p. 345.
- Shepperd, Gilbert Alan (1972). A history of war and weapons, 1660 to 1918. United States of America. ISBN 0-690-39367-9.
- Siborne, William (1848). The Waterloo Campaign, 1815 (4th ed.). Westminster: A. Constable.
- Skeat, Walter William (2005). A Concise Etymological Dictionary of the English Language. Lightning Source Incorporated. ISBN 9781596050921.
- Speake, Jennifer (2000). The Oxford dictionary of Foreign Words and Phrases. Oxford University Press. ISBN 9780192801128.
- Trąbski, Maciej (2009). "Uzbojenie i umundurowanie kawalerii narodowej wojska koronnego w latach 1775–1794". Prace Naukowe Akademii im. Jana Długosza w Częstochowie. 10.
- Weekley, Ernest (1921). An etymological dictionary of modern English.
- Zaloga, S. J. (1983). The Polish Army 1939–45. London: Osprey Publishing. ISBN 0-85045-417-4.

=== Further reading ===
- Coil, Spencer A. (2003). Uniforms & Equipment of the Austro-Hungarian Army in World War I. Schiffer Pub. ISBN 0764318691. OCLC 55948007.
- Marrion, R.J. (1975), Lancers and Dragoons, Almark Publishing Company Ltd., ISBN 0-85524-202-7.
- Sanders, Paul (2010). Regimental Steins of the Kaiser's Cavalry: Kürassier, Dragoon, Jager Zu Pferde, Hussar, Uhlan. Schiffer Pub. ISBN 9780764336836. OCLC 642837794.
