= Kurtka =

Short uniform military jacket

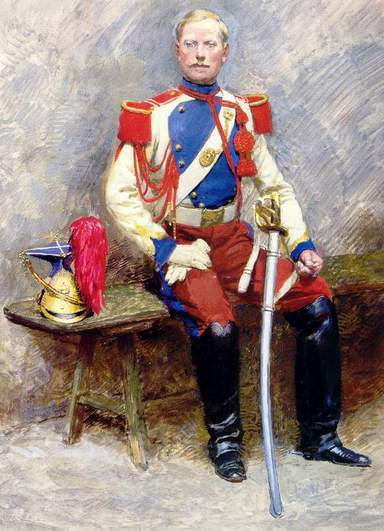
An officer of the Lancers of the Imperial Guard during the Second French Empire, 1852 to 1870. He is wearing a white kurtka with a blue plastron and red epaulettes.

A kurtka (куртка) is the generic word for a jacket in a number of European languages, most notably in Polish and Russian.

== Etymology ==
The word itself is a Slavic diminutive of the original Hungarian word kurta, which in turn was derived of the Latin word curtus, "excurtus", meaning short (see Alejandro Cioranescu: Diccionario Etimologico Rumano).

== Military uniforms ==
In terms of military uniforms, the kurtka was a type of close fitting double breasted jacket, cut to the waist and often worn with a plastron, a contrasting-coloured panel of cloth covering the chest. It was worn by lancers and uhlans, a type of light cavalry which had its origins in the Lipka Tatars who served the kings of Poland, but were widely copied by the armies of many western nations from the start of the 19th century along with their distinctive style of dress.

The lancer's kurtka (also known as ulanka in Poland) developed from a jacket called a kontusz, which during the late 18th century became shortened into the kurtka.

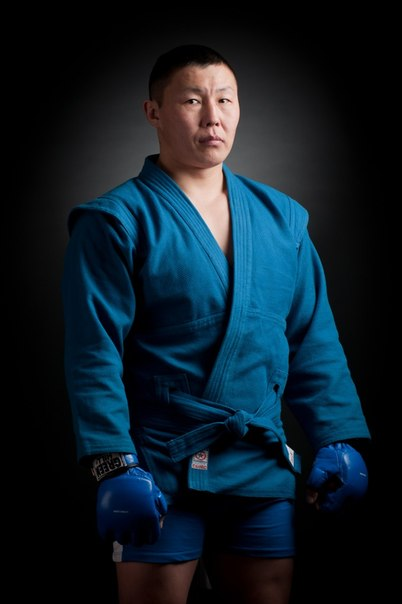
Wearing a blue kurtka, Damba Radnaev was the World Sambo Champion in 2015.

== Martial arts ==
In addition to the general meaning of "jacket", the word kurtka refers to the garment normally worn by Sambo practitioners, similar to the keikogi in style and function, although it is tighter fitting and has epaulettes and belt loops. A kurtka should be made of canvas or other heavy material, should be tight-fitting, should not extend more than eight inches below the belt (roughly equal to the bottom of the sleeve) and the sleeves must be long enough to cover the arms to the wrists, and wide enough at the end to fit the wrist and four fingers.

== See also ==
- Sportswear (activewear)
