= Lance =

Long spear used by cavalry

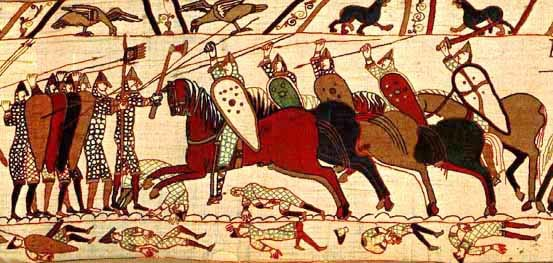
Norman cavalry attacks the Anglo-Saxon shield wall at the Battle of Hastings as depicted in the Bayeux Tapestry. The lances depicted here are held with a one-handed over-the-head grip, and so their use is not the same as the lances of the later medieval period, when they were fitted with a grapper designed to engage a lance rest attached to the wielder's plate armour and used couched in the charge.

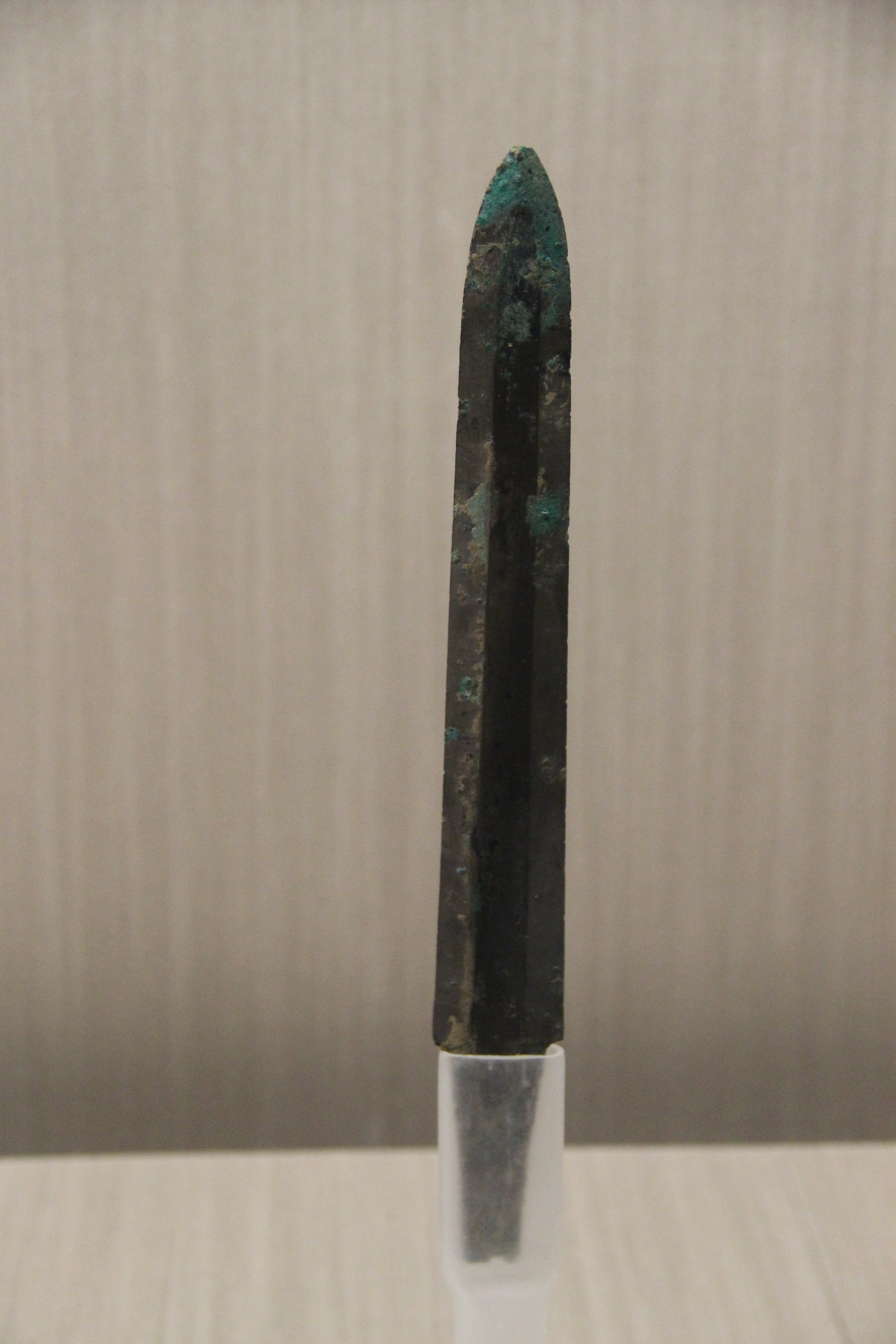
Lance head, Warring States period

The English term lance is derived, via Middle English launce and Old French lance, from the Latin lancea, a generic term meaning a spear or javelin employed by both infantry and cavalry, with English initially keeping these generic meanings. It developed later into a term for spear-like weapons specially designed and modified to be part of a "weapon system" for use couched under the arm during a charge, being equipped with special features such as grappers to engage with lance rests attached to breastplates, and vamplates, small circular plates designed to prevent the hand sliding up the shaft upon impact. These specific features were in use by the late 14th century.

Though best known as a military and sporting weapon carried by European knights and men-at-arms, the use of lances was widespread throughout East Asia, the Middle East, and North Africa wherever suitable mounts were available. Lances were the main weapon of lancers of the medieval period and beyond, and these troops also carried secondary weapons such as swords, battle axes, war hammers, maces, and daggers for use in hand-to-hand combat, since the lance was often a one-use-per-engagement weapon, becoming embedded in their targets or being broken on impact. Assuming the lance survived the initial impact without breaking, it could also prove inappropriate for more static, closer engagements where its length became a hindrance.

== Etymology ==
The name is derived from the word lancea, the Roman auxiliaries' javelin or throwing spear; although according to the OED, the word may be of Iberian origin. Also compare λόγχη (lónkhē), a Greek term for "spear" or "lance".

A lance in the original sense is a light throwing spear or javelin. The English verb to launch "fling, hurl, throw" is derived from the term (via Old French lancier), as well as the rarer or poetic to lance. The term from the 17th century came to refer specifically to spears not thrown, used for thrusting by heavy cavalry, and especially in jousting. The longer types of thrusting spear used by infantry are usually referred to simply as spears or later as pikes, though many other terms existed.

== History of use ==
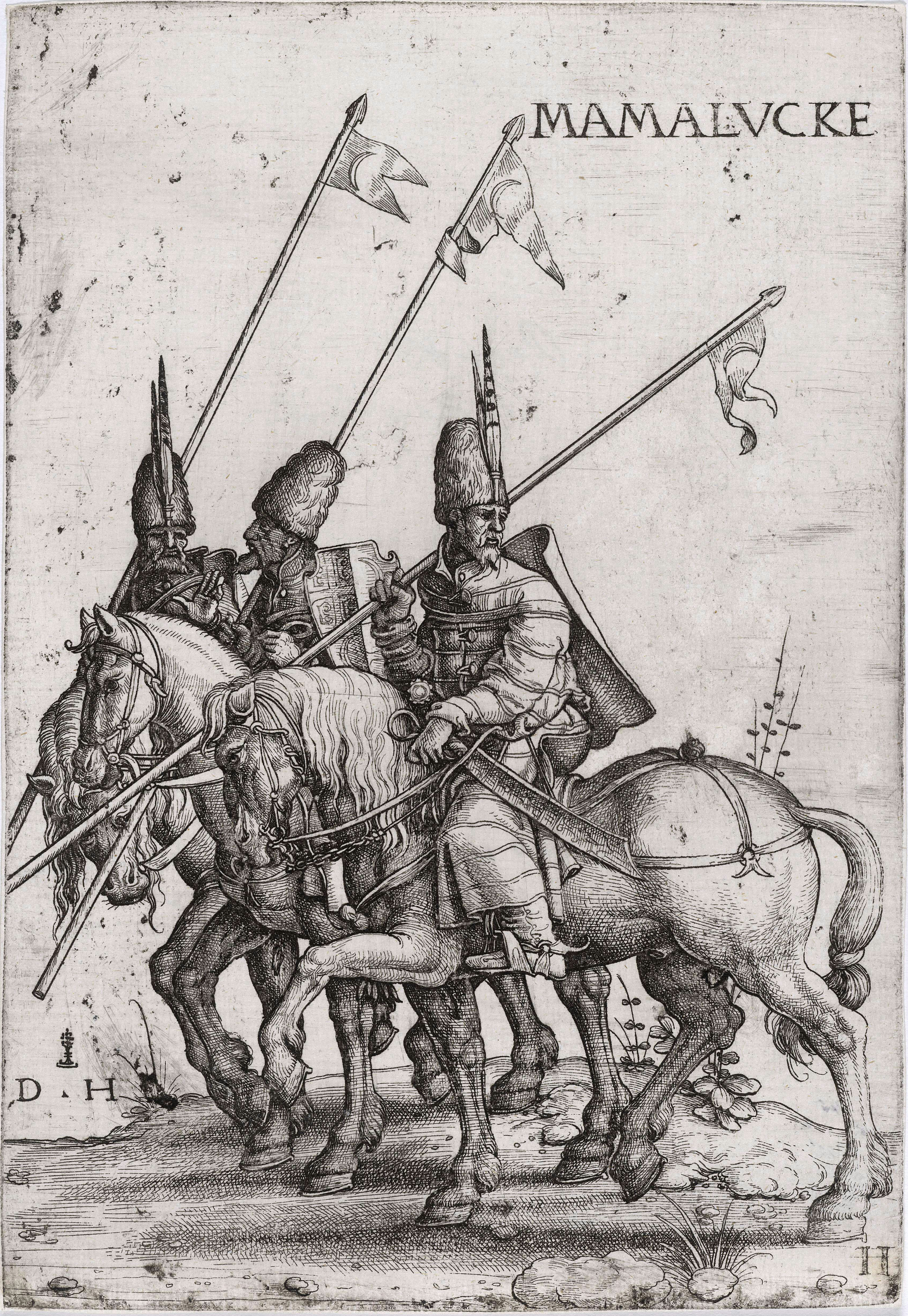
Three Mamelukes with lances on horseback, etching by Daniel Hopfer (ca 1470-1536)

=== Ancient Era ===
Pike like weapons were used by cavalry since antiquity. The kontos was a type of lance mentioned in Greek texts which was employed by cataphracts especially the grivpanvar. During the late 3rd century the weapons of the cavalry attached to each Roman legion evolved from javelins and swords to sometimes include long reaching lances (contus). These required the use of both hands to thrust.

=== Middle Ages ===
The Byzantine cavalry used lances (kontos or kontarion) almost exclusively, often in mixed formations of mounted archers and lancers (cursores et defensores). The Byzantines used lances in both overarm and underarm grips, as well as being couched under the arm (held horizontally). The length of the standard kontarion is estimated at 2.5 meters (8.2 ft), which is shorter than that of the medieval knight of Western Europe.

Formations of knights were known to use underarm-couched military lances in full-gallop closed-ranks charges against lines of opposing infantry or cavalry. Two variants on the couched lance charge developed, the French method, en haie, with lancers in a double line, and the German method, with lancers drawn up in a deeper formation which was often wedge-shaped. It is commonly believed that this became the dominant European cavalry tactic in the 11th century after the development of the cantled saddle and stirrups (the Great Stirrup Controversy), and of rowel spurs (which enabled better control of the mount). Cavalry thus outfitted and deployed had a tremendous collective force in their charge, and could shatter most contemporary infantry lines.

Because of the extreme stopping power of a thrusting spear, it quickly became a popular weapon of infantry in the Late Middle Ages. These eventually led to the rise of the longest type of spears, the pike. This adaptation of the cavalry lance to infantry use was largely tasked with stopping lance-armed cavalry charges. During the 14th, 15th, and 16th centuries, these weapons, both mounted and unmounted, were so effective that lancers and pikemen not only became a staple of every Western army, but also became highly sought-after mercenaries. (However, the pike had already been used by Philip II of Macedon in antiquity to great effect, in the form of the sarissa.)

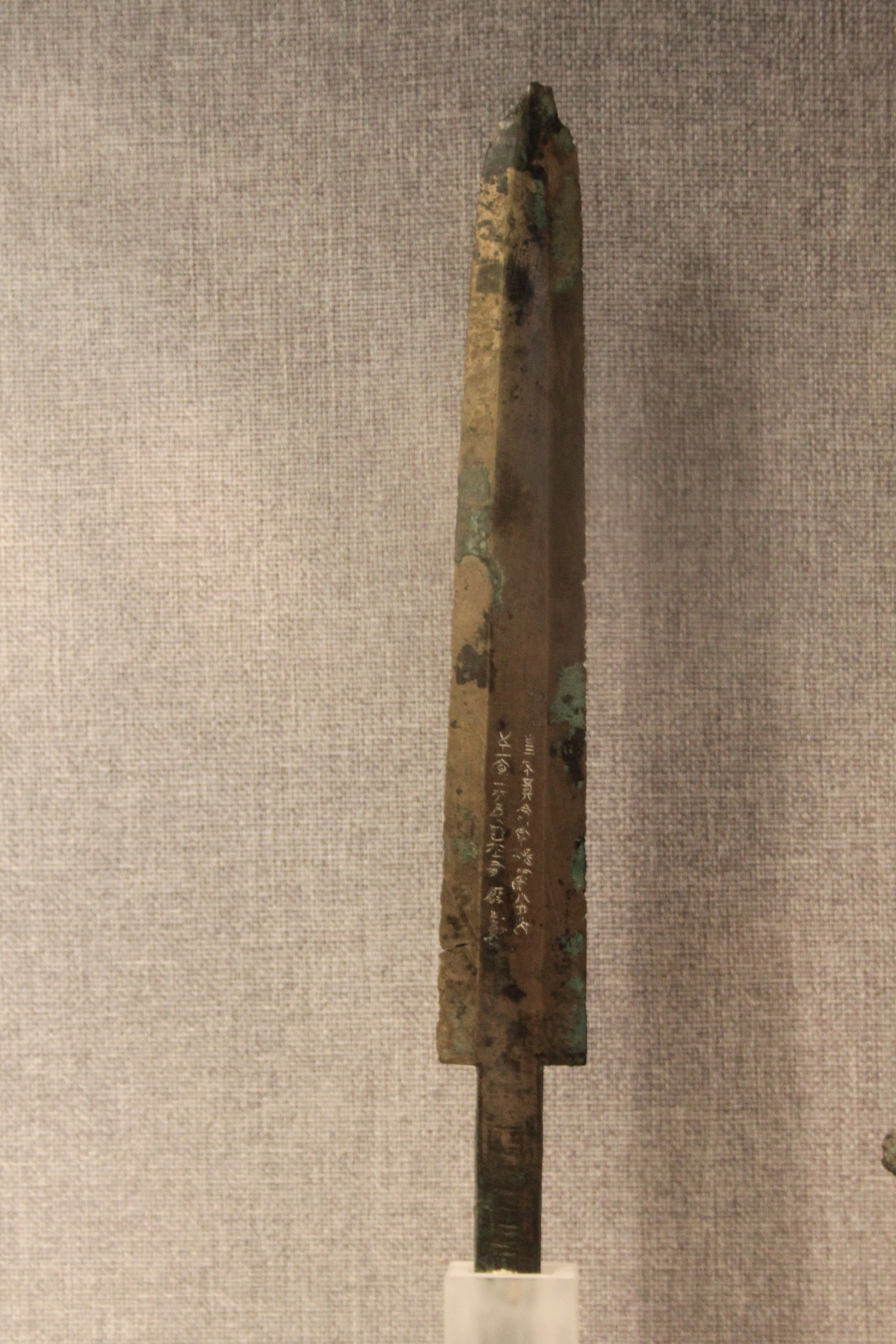
Warring States lance head (pi)

In Europe, a jousting lance was a variation of the knight's lance which was modified from its original war design. In jousting, the lance tips would usually be blunt, often spread out like a cup or furniture foot, to provide a wider impact surface designed to unseat the opposing rider without spearing him through. The centre of the shaft of such lances could be designed to be hollow, in order for it to break on impact, as a further safeguard against impalement. Jousting lances were often made of pine or fir, much more fragile than war lances made from ash or oak. They were on average 3 meters (9.8 ft) long, and had hand guards built into the lance, often tapering for a considerable portion of the weapon's length. These are the versions that can most often be seen at medieval reenactment festivals. In war, lances were much more like stout spears, long and balanced for one-handed use, made of heavier and strong wood, and with sharpened tips for biting in and piercing armor.

==== Lance (unit organization) ====
As a small unit that surrounded a knight when he went into battle during the 14th and 15th centuries, a lance might have consisted of one or two squires, the knight himself, one to three men-at-arms, and possibly an archer. Lances were often combined under the banner of a higher-ranking nobleman to form companies of knights that would act as an ad hoc unit.

In some late medieval armies, especially in Italy, a lance was also a formal administrative and pay unit of three fighting men: the man-at-arms, a squire, and a servant.

=== 17th and 18th century decline in Western Europe ===
The advent of wheellock technology spelled the end of the lance in Western Europe, with newer types of heavy cavalry such as reiters and cuirassiers spurning the old one-use weapon and increasingly supplanting the older gendarme type Medieval cavalry. While many Renaissance captains such as Sir Roger Williams continued to espouse the virtues of the lance, many such as François de la Noue openly encouraged its abandonment in the face of the pistol's greater armor piercing power, handiness and greater general utility. At the same time the adoption of pike and shot tactic by most infantry forces would neuter much of the power of the lancer's breakneck charge, making them a non-cost effective type of military unit due to their expensive horses in comparison to cuirassiers and reiters, who were usually charging only at a trot and could make do with lower quality mounts. After the success of pistol-armed Huguenot heavy horse against their Royalist counterparts during the French Wars of Religion, most Western European powers started rearming their lancers with pistols, initially as an adjunct weapon and eventually as a replacement, with the Spanish retaining the lance the longest.

Only the Polish–Lithuanian Commonwealth with its greater emphasis on cavalry warfare, large population of Szlachta nobility, and relatively lower level of military technology among its opponents retained the lance to a considerable degree. The Polish hussars reached their peak during the 17th and 18th centuries against a wide variety of enemy forces.

=== Indigenous use in North America ===
After the Western introduction of the horse to Native Americans, the Plains Indians used the bow and lance, probably independently, as American cavalry of the time were armed with the pistol and sabre, firing forward at full gallop.

=== 19th century revival in Western Europe ===
The mounted lancer experienced a renaissance in the 19th century. This followed on the demise of the pike and of body armor during the early 18th century, with the reintroduction of lances coming from Hungary and Poland, having retained large formations of lance-armed cavalry when they had become more or less obsolescent elsewhere in Europe. Lancers became especially prevalent during and after the Napoleonic Wars: a period when almost all the major European powers reintroduced the lance into their respective cavalry arsenals. Formations of uhlans and other types of cavalry used lances between 2 and 3 meters (6.6 and 9.8 ft) in length as their primary weapons. The lance was usually employed in initial charges in close formation, with sabers being used in the melee that followed.

The Crimean War saw the use of the lance in the Charge of the Light Brigade. One of the four British regiments involved in the charge, plus the Russian Cossacks who counter-attacked, were armed with this weapon.

During the War of the Triple Alliance (1864–1870), the Paraguayan cavalry made effective use of locally manufactured lances, both of conventional design and of an antique pattern used by gauchos for cattle herding.

The 1860s and 1870s saw the increasing common usage of ash, bamboo, beech, or pine wood for lance shafts of varying lengths, each with steel points and butts, adopted by the uhlan regiments of the Saxon, Württemberg, Bavarian, and Prussian armies.

=== Twilight of use ===
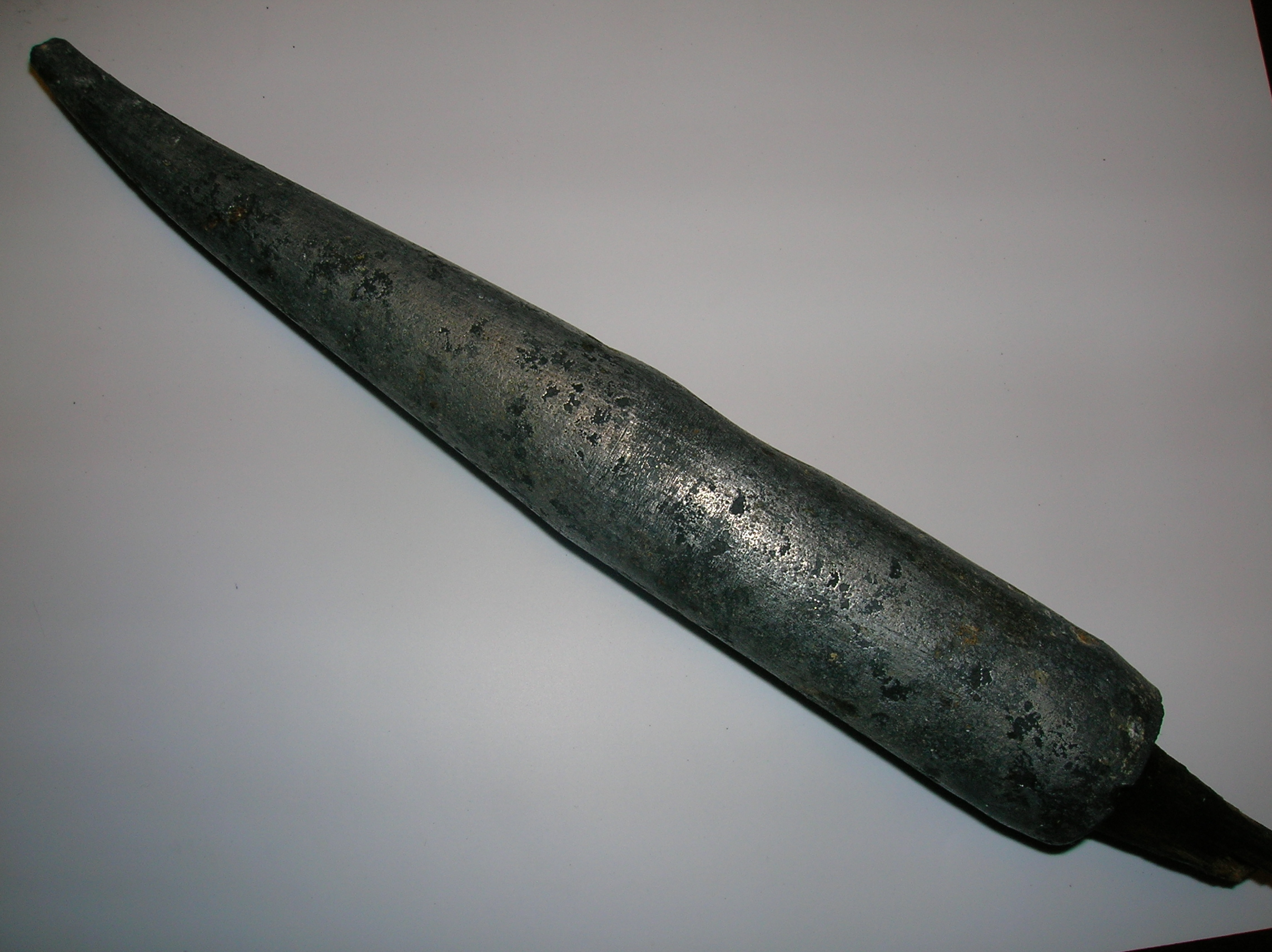
A lance head from the reenactment of the Eglinton Tournament (1839)

In the American Civil War, the 6th Pennsylvania Cavalry Regiment and 1st California Cavalry Battalion were equipped with lances modeled after those of Napoleon Bonaparte's forces in France. American troops had never previously used the lance in combat. The 21st Texas Cavalry Regiment was a unit in Confederate service that was originally to be armed with lances, but it never received them and served as an ordinary cavalry regiment. The 21st Texas Cavalry Regiment was highly publicized in South Central Texas modeling after Mexican lancers, and the idea of serving as a lancer was very popular among Texans facing the possibility of induction into the infantry. The lances proved ineffective in battle and were replaced with carbine rifles in 1863. The lancer units in the US Civil War were often seen as romantic and idealized, but they were not always effective in combat. The lancer units were a part of the larger cavalry system, which included both mounted and dismounted units, and both side played a role in the strategic and tactical maneuvers of the post-Napoleonic war.

The Franco-Prussian War of 1870 saw the extensive deployment of cavalry armed with lances on both sides. While the opportunities for decisive use of this weapon proved infrequent during the actual conflict, the entire cavalry corps (93 regiments of hussars, dragoons, cuirassiers, and uhlans) of the post-war Imperial German Army subsequently adopted the lance as a primary weapon. After 1893 the standard German cavalry lance was made of drawn tubular steel, covered with clear lacquer and with a hemp hand-grip. At 3.58 meters (11.7 ft) it was the longest version then in use.

The Austrian cavalry had included regiments armed with lances since 1784. In 1884, the lance ceased to be carried either as an active service or parade weapon. However the eleven Uhlan regiments continued in existence until 1918, armed with the standard cavalry sabre.

During the Second Boer War, British troops successfully used the lance on one occasion - against retreating Boers at the Battle of Elandslaagte (21 October 1899). However, the Boers made effective use of trench warfare, rapid-fire field artillery, continuous-fire machine guns, and accurate long-range repeating rifles from the beginning of the war. The combined effect was devastating, so much of the British cavalry was deployed as mounted infantry, dismounting to fight on foot. For some years after the Boer War, the six British lancer regiments officially carried the lance only for parades and other ceremonial duties. At the regimental level, training in the use of the lance continued, ostensibly to improve recruit riding skills. In 1909, the 2.7-meter (8.9 ft) bamboo or ash lance with a steel head was reauthorized for general use on active service.

The Russian cavalry (except for the Cossacks) discarded the lance in the late 19th century, but in 1907, it was reissued for use by the front line of each squadron when charging in open formation. In its final form, the Russian lance was a long metal tube with a steel head and leather arm strap. It was intended as a shock weapon in the charge, to be dropped after impact and replaced by the sword for close combat in a melee. While demoralizing to an opponent, the lance was recognized as being an awkward encumbrance in forested regions.

The relative value of the lance and the sword as a principal weapon for mounted troops was an issue of dispute in the years immediately preceding World War I. Opponents of the lance argued that the weapon was clumsy, conspicuous, easily deflected, and inefficient in a melee. Arguments favoring the retention of the lance focused on the impact on morale of having charging cavalry preceded by "a hedge of steel" and on the effectiveness of the weapon against fleeing opponents.

=== World War I and after ===
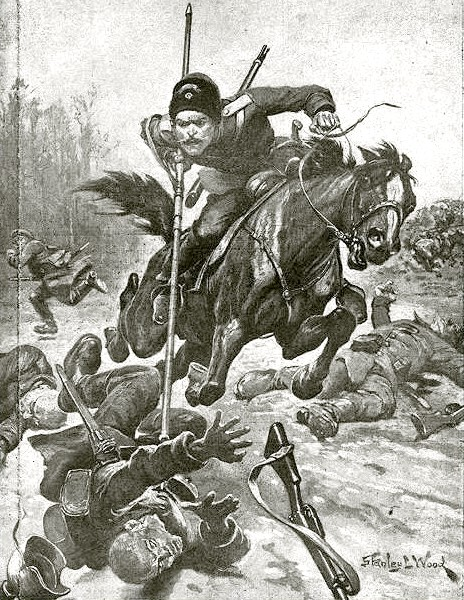
Drawing from The War Illustrated representing a Russian Don Cossack cavalryman lancing a German infantryman

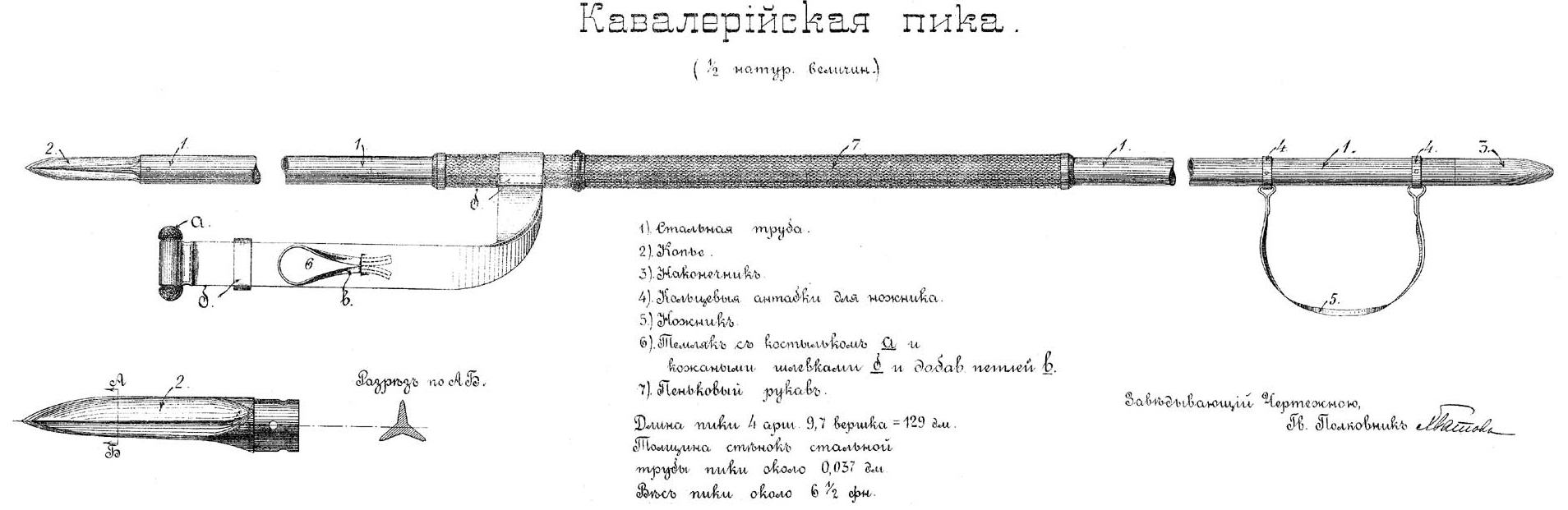
Russian lance "cavalry pike", type of 1910

Lances were still in use by the British, Turkish, Italian, Spanish, French, Belgian, Indian, German, and Russian armies at the outbreak of World War I. In initial cavalry skirmishes in France this antique weapon proved ineffective, German uhlans being "hampered by their long lances and a good many threw them away". A major action involving repeated charges by four regiments of German cavalry, all armed with lances, at Halen on 12 August 1914 was unsuccessful. Amongst the Belgian defenders was one regiment of lancers who fought dismounted.

With the advent of trench warfare, lances and the cavalry that carried them ceased to play a significant role. A Russian cavalry officer whose regiment carried lances throughout the war recorded only one instance where an opponent was killed by this weapon.

The Greco-Turkish War (1919–1922), saw an unexpected revival of lances amongst the cavalry of the Turkish National Army. During the successful Turkish offensives of the final stages of the war across the open plains of Asia Minor, Turkish mounted troops were armed with bamboo shafted-lances taken from military storage and inflicted heavy losses on the retreating Greek Army.

The cavalry branches of most armies which still retained lances as a service weapon at the end of World War I generally discarded them for all but ceremonial occasions during the 1920s and 1930s. There were exceptions during this era, such as the Polish cavalry, which retained the lance for combat use until either 1934 or 1937, but contrary to popular legend did not make use of it in World War II. The German cavalry retained the lance (Stahlrohrlanze) as a service weapon until 1927, as did the British cavalry until 1928. The Argentine cavalry were documented as carrying lances until the 1940s, but this appears to have been used as part of recruit riding school training, rather than serious preparation for use in active service.

== Use as flagstaff ==
The United States Cavalry used a lance-like shaft as a flagstaff.

== Mounted police use ==
When the Canadian North-West Mounted Police was established, it was modeled after certain British cavalry units that used lances. It made limited use of this weapon in small detachments during the 1870s, intended to impress indigenous peoples.

The modern Royal Canadian Mounted Police, the North-West Mounted Police's descendant, employs ceremonial, though functional, lances made of male bamboo. They feature a crimped swallowtail pennant, red above and white below.

The New South Wales Mounted Police, based at Redfern Barracks, Sydney, Australia, carry a lance with a navy blue and white pennant on ceremonial occasions.

== Other weapons ==
"Lance" is also the name given by some anthropologists to the light flexible javelins (technically darts) thrown by atlatls (spear-throwing sticks), but these are usually called "atlatl javelins". Some were not much larger than arrows, and were typically feather-fletched like an arrow and unlike the vast majority of spears and javelins (one exception would be several instances of the many types of ballista bolt, a mechanically thrown spear).

A "tilting-spear" is a heraldric term for a lance.

== See also ==
- Tent pegging
