= Lancer =

Type of light or heavy cavalry armed with a lance

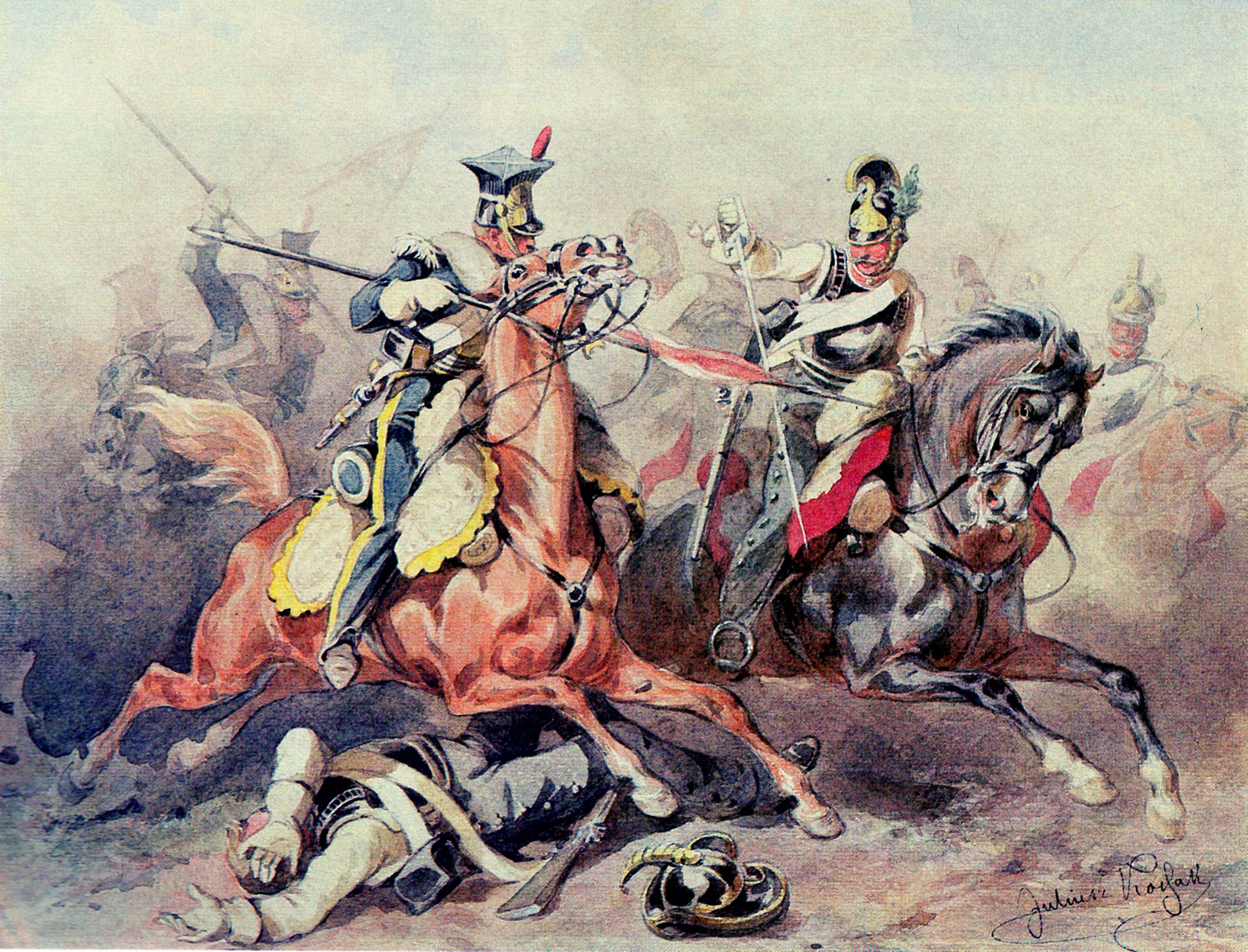
A Polish lancer (left) fighting against an Austrian cuirassier during the Napoleonic Wars

A lancer was a type of cavalryman who fought with a lance. Lances were used for mounted warfare in Assyria as early as 700 BC and subsequently by India, Egypt, China, Persia, Greece, and Rome. The weapon was widely used throughout Eurasia during the Middle Ages and the Renaissance by heavy cavalry, but fell out of general use by the late 16th century, before its revival by light cavalry in the early 19th century. Lance cavalry remained in an active role into the early 20th century and World War I. In modern times, many militaries retain units designated as lancers. However, the lance itself has been relegated to a ceremonial role.

== Early modern era ==
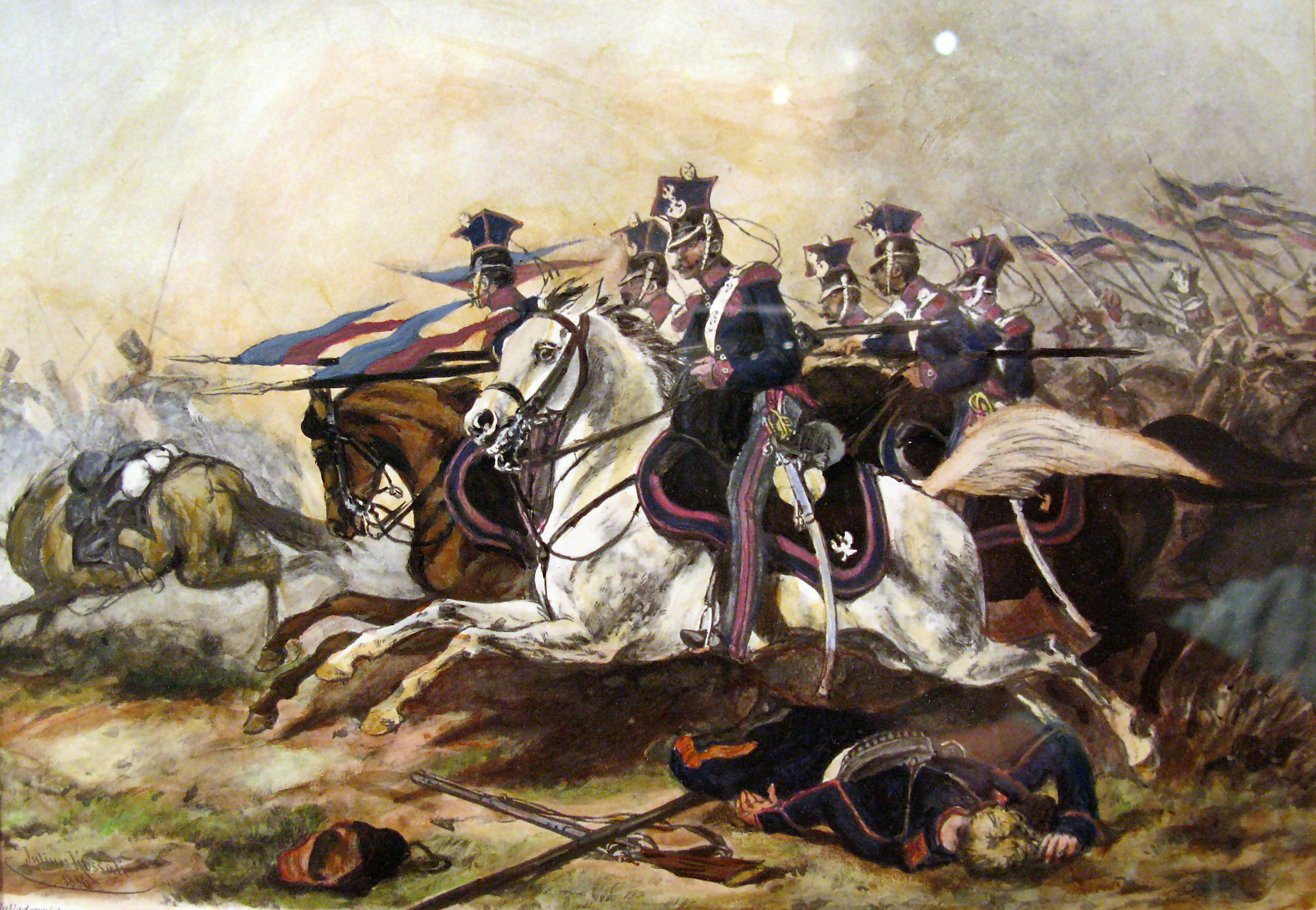
Charge of the Polish uhlans at the city of Poznań during the November uprising in 1831

The lancer (Polish: ułan, German: Ulan, French: uhlan) had become a common sight in the majority of European, Ottoman, and Indian cavalry forces during this time, but, with the exception of the Ottoman troops, they increasingly discarded the heavy armour to give greater freedom of movement in combat. The Polish "winged" lancers (hussars) were amongst the last European units to abandon their armour. There was debate over the value of the lance in mounted combat during the 17th and 18th centuries, with most armies having very few lancer units by the beginning of the 19th century.

However, during the Napoleonic Wars, lancers were to be seen in many of the combatant nations as their value in shock tactics became clear. During the wars, the Poles became a ready source of recruitment for several armies, willingly or unwillingly. Polish lancers served with distinction in the Austrian, Prussian, Russian, and French armies, most famously in Napoleon's French Imperial Guard as the 1^{er} Régiment de Chevau-Légers-Lanciers de la Garde Impériale.

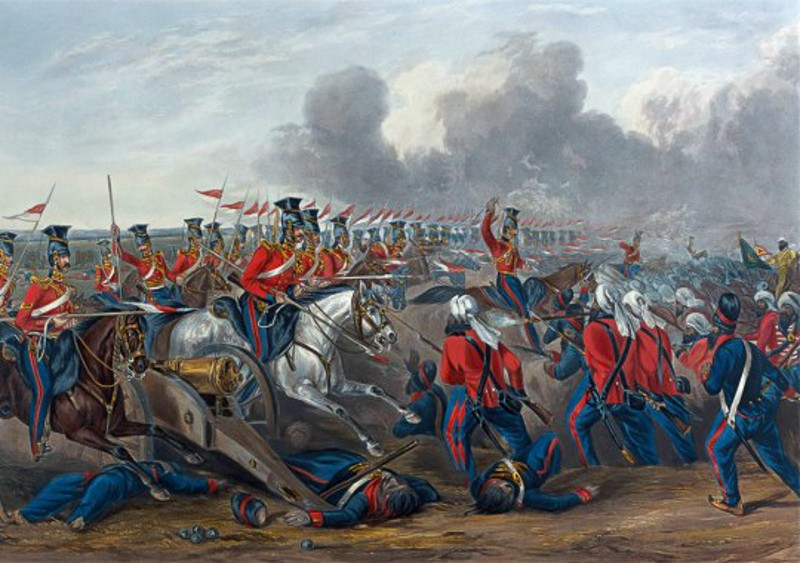
The charge of the British 16th Lancers at Aliwal on 28 January 1846, during the Anglo-Sikh war

At the Battle of Waterloo, French lances were "nearly 3 metres (9.8 ft) long, weighed around 3 kilograms (6.6 lb), and had a steel point on a wooden staff," according to historian Alessandro Barbero. He adds that they were "terrifyingly efficient". Commander of the French 1st Corps, 4th Division General Durutte, who saw the battle from the high ground in front of Papelotte, would write later, "I had never before realized the great superiority of the lance over the sword."

Although having substantial impact in the charge, lancers could be more vulnerable to other cavalry units in close quarters combat, where the lance proved to be a clumsy and easily deflected weapon when employed against sabres in a mêlée. By the late 19th century, many cavalry regiments in Eurasian armies were composed of troopers with lances in the front rank and those with sabres in the second: the lances for the initial shock and sabres for the ensuing mêlée.

=== Lancer equipment ===
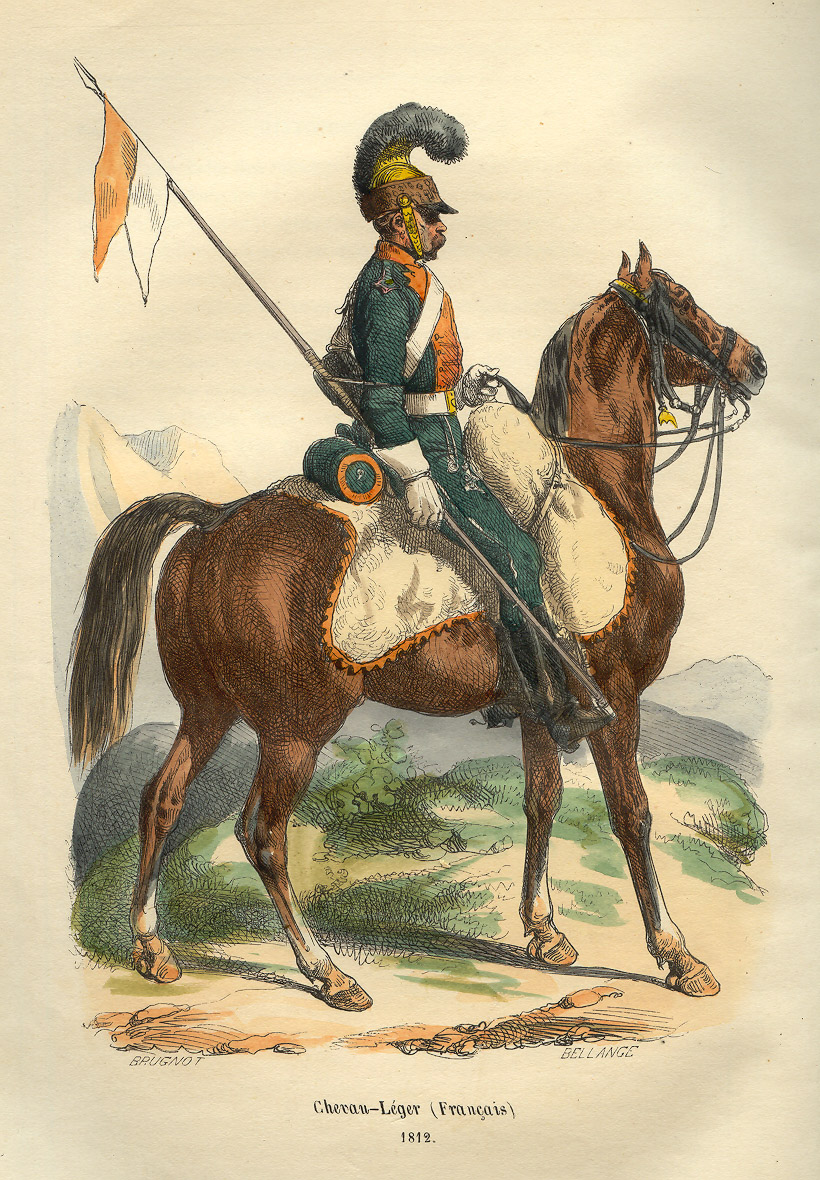
Imperial French lancer from 1812

Lancers typically wore a double-breasted jacket (kurtka) with a coloured panel at the front (plastron), a coloured band of cloth (sash), and a square-topped cap (czapka). Their lance usually had a small swallow-tailed flag (pennon), just below the lance head. The pennons were normally removed or wrapped in a canvas cover during active service. With the improved range and accuracy of infantry muskets and rifles, the high profile presented by lancers with their conspicuous weapons became a problem. Lancers were trained to lower their lances when scouting on hilltops, to help avoid detection by enemy combatants.

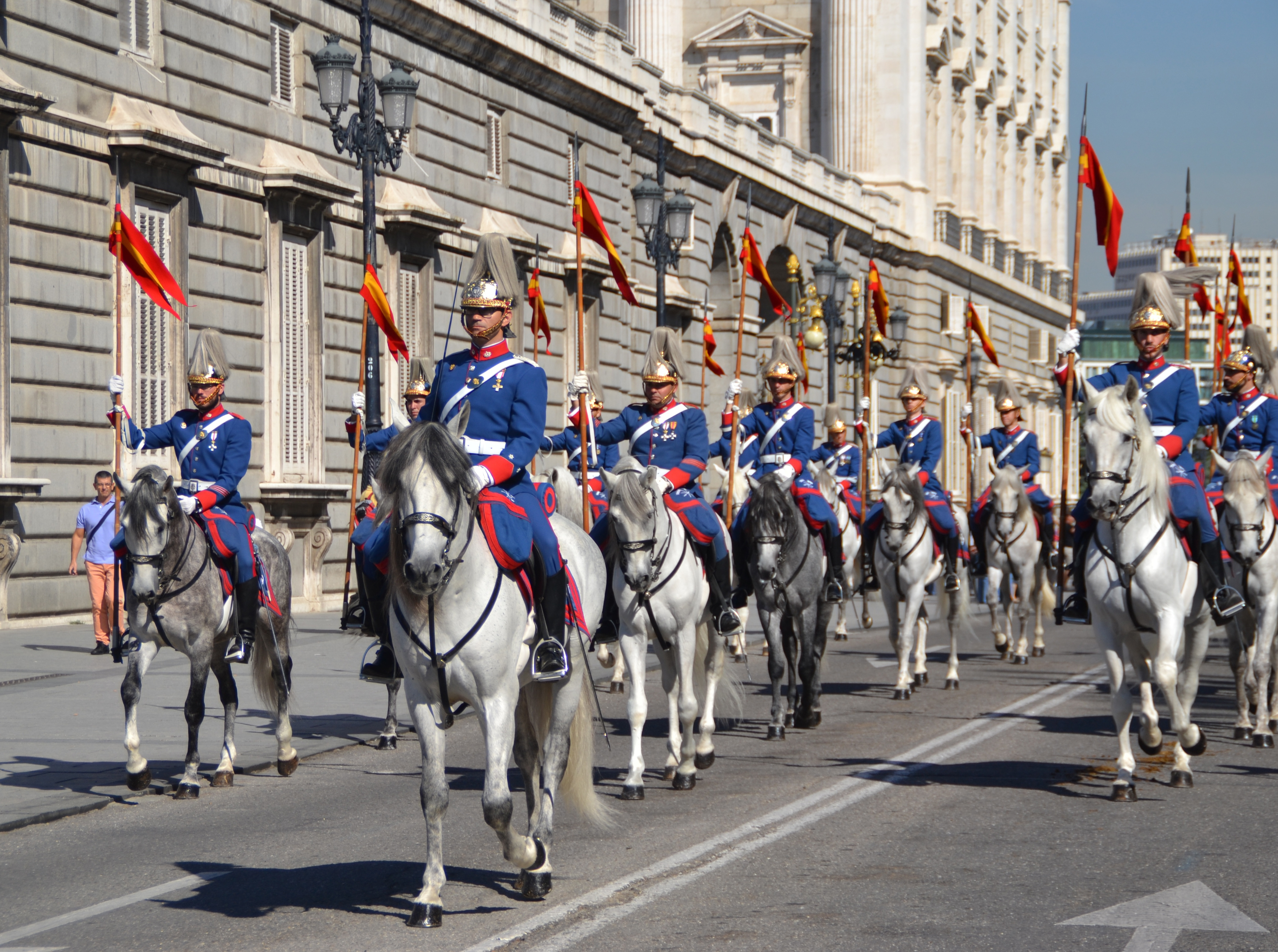
Lancers of the Spanish Royal Guard

== 20th-century ==
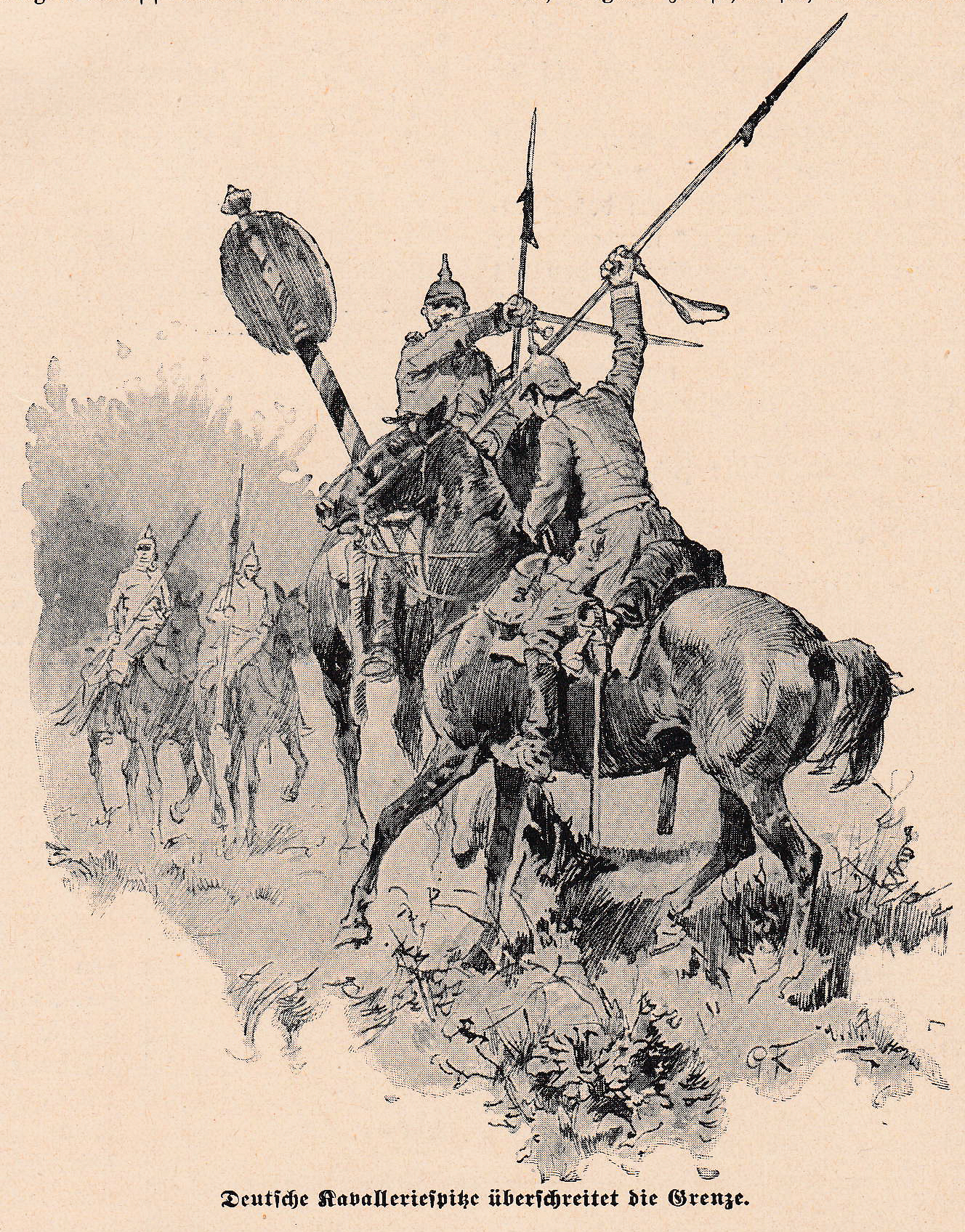
German dragoons armed with lances take down a border marker in 1914

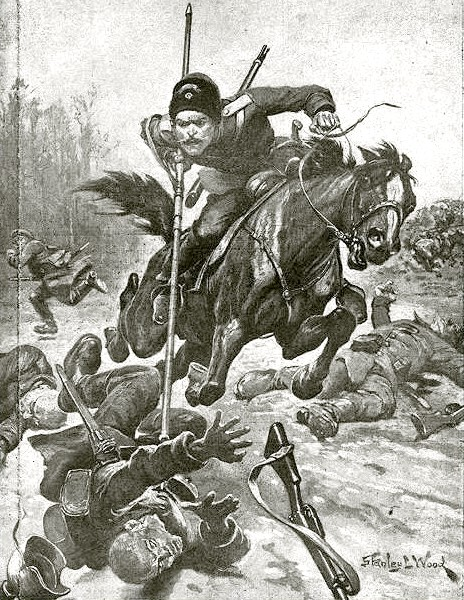
1915 drawing from The War Illustrated portraying a charging Don Cossack using a lance as a shock weapon

In 1914, lances were still being carried by regiments in the British, Indian, French, Prussian, Italian, Chilean, Portuguese, Japanese, Spanish, Ottoman, Belgian, Argentine, Russian, and Siamese armies, among others. Almost all German cavalry branches (cuirassiers, hussars, dragoons, and uhlans) retained steel tube lances (Stahlrohrlanze) 3.2 meters (10 ft) in length, as their primary weapon. As late as 1914, half of the troopers in each Russian regular cavalry regiment (hussars, uhlans, and dragoons) carried lances on active service, as did all cossacks.

The British cavalry lost the lance for all but ceremonial use in 1903, following the Second Boer War. However, a conservative revaluation led to its reintroduction as an active service weapon from 1909 to 1928. (Note: For an illustration of a fully armed lancer, see Michael Chappell's "Men at Arms Series British Cavalry Equipment 1800–1941" illustration G 1.) British lances were made of bamboo and later ash wood.

The French army did not have lancer regiments as such, but steel lances 2.97 meters (9.7 ft) in length were carried by the twenty-six dragoon regiments and some light cavalry units in 1914. The French had earlier tested the Indian bamboo lances used by the British cavalry, but rated them as being too fragile for the shock of encounter. The six Italian lancieri regiments still in existence until 1920 carried the 1870 model of ashwood lance, noted for its balance and manageability.

Coat of arms of the Cavalry Group "Lancers of Bourbon" (11th Cavalry Regiment "Spain")

Prior to the outbreak of World War I, there had been controversy as to whether lances or sabres were the more effective armes blanche (i.e. mêlée weapons) for cavalry, but neither proved a match for modern firearms and/or artillery. Some armies continued to use lances throughout the war, but they rarely saw use on the Western Front after initial clashes in France and Belgium in 1914. On the Eastern Front, mounted cavalry still had a role and lances saw limited use by the Russian, German, and Austrian armies.

During the 1920s and 1930s, the use of lances ceased for active service in most armies. The German cavalry retained the lance as a service weapon until 1927, as did the British cavalry until 1928. Some other armies retained lance-armed cavalry units for ceremonial purposes only. The Polish cavalry did not discard the lance as a weapon until 1934 or 1937 and continued to use it for training and ceremonial purposes until the outbreak of World War II.

== Current lancer units ==
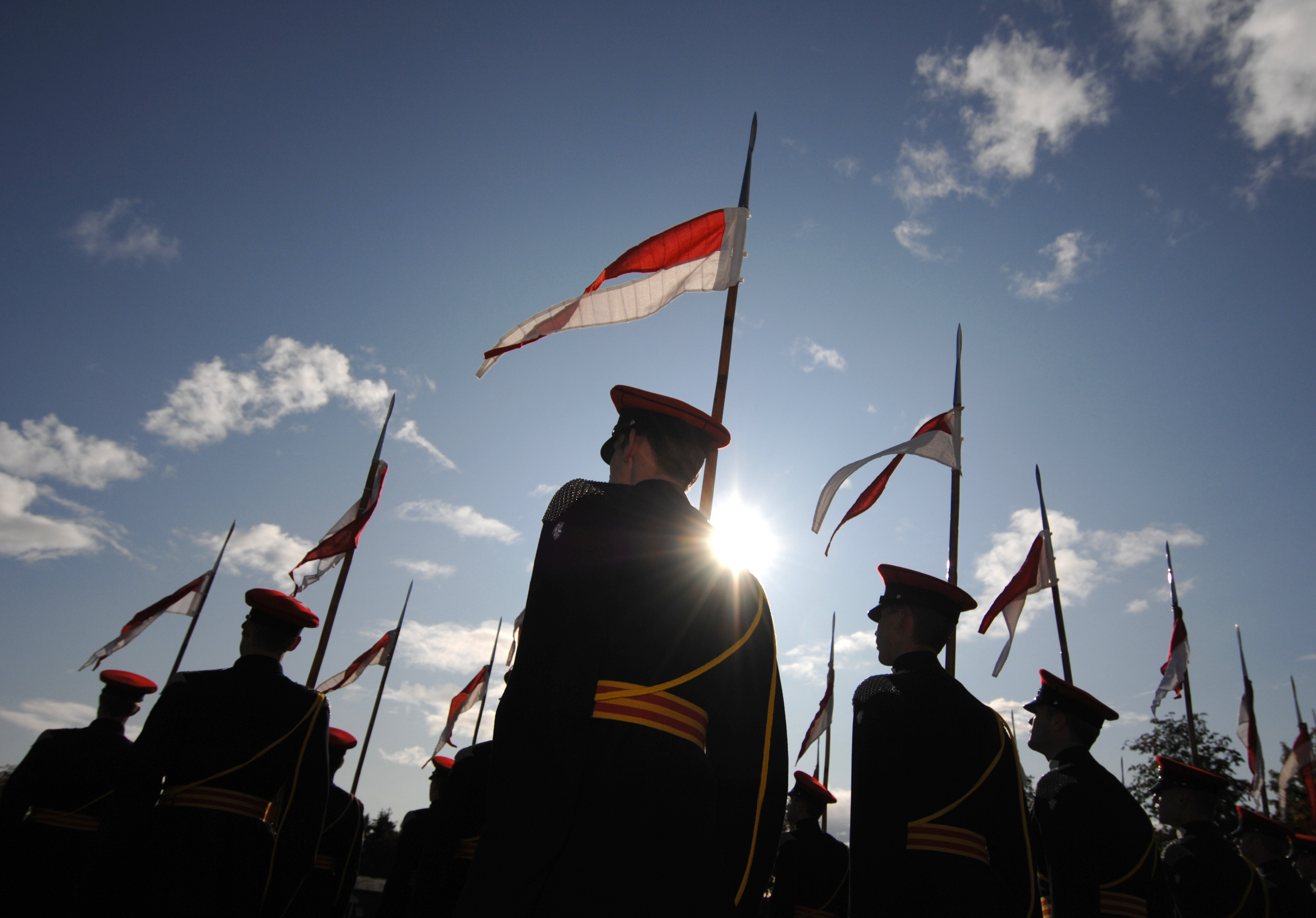
British lancers taking part in a homecoming parade in 2008

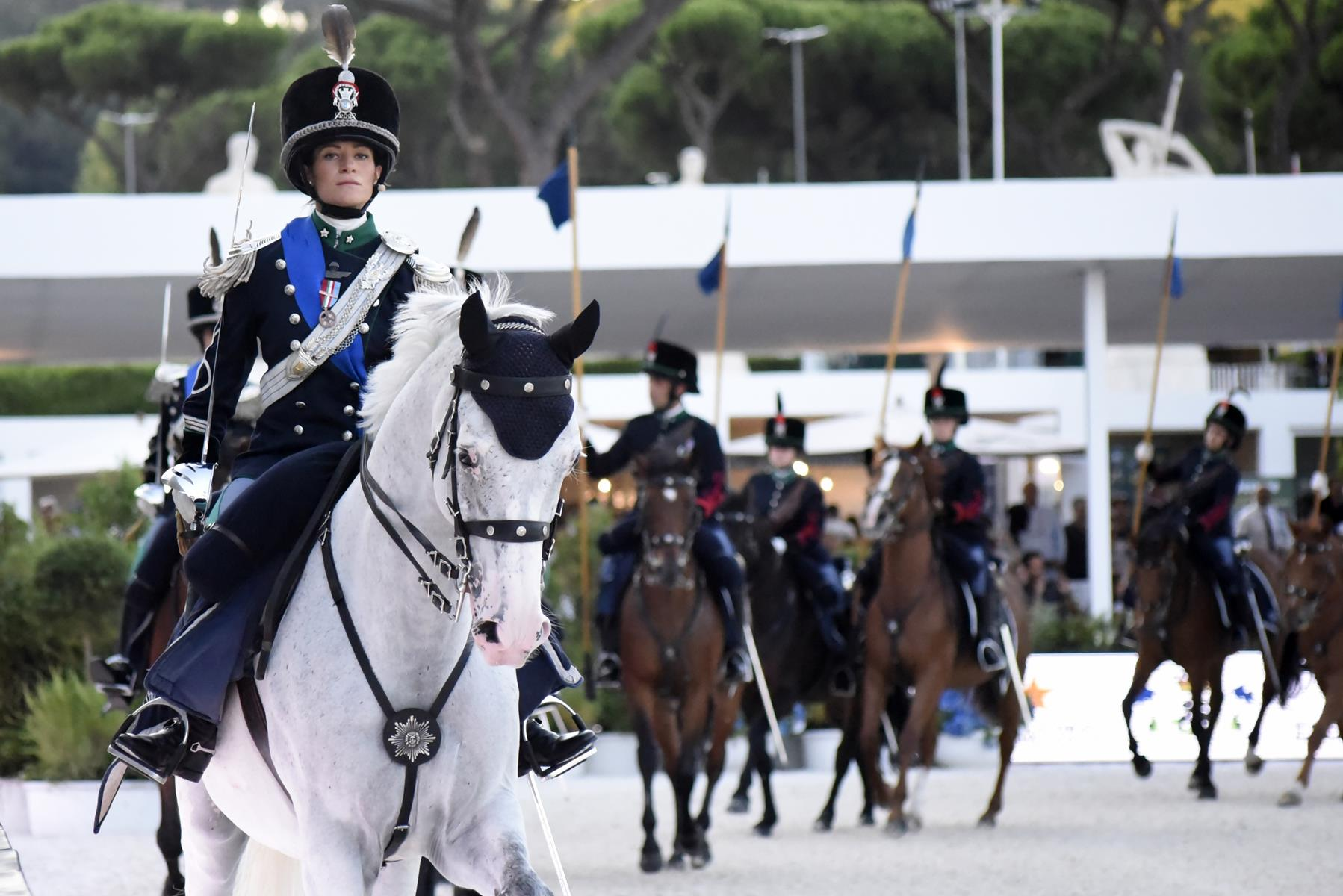
Italian regiment Lancieri di Montebello on public duties in Rome in 2019

Some modern armoured cavalry units are still designated as lancer regiments for historical and ceremonial reasons. There are examples in the armies of Spain (the King's Lancers Troop of the Royal Guard's Escort Squadron and the Bourbon's Lancers Group of the 11th Cavalry Regiment), United Kingdom (Royal Lancers), India (2nd Lancers (Gardner's Horse) and 20th Lancers), Belgium (1/3rd Lancers Battalion), Portugal (2nd Lancers Regiment), Pakistan, Italy (5th Lancieri di Novara, 6th Lancieri di Aosta, 8th Lancieri di Montebello), Australia (12th/16th Hunter River Lancers, 1st/15th Royal New South Wales Lancers), Argentina (2nd Tank Cavalry Regiment "General Paz's Lancers"), Canada (Lord Strathcona's Horse), Chile (5th Cavalry Regiment "Lancers"), and the United States (National Lancers, Massachusetts Organized Militia)

Although not classified as lancers, the Brazilian Army's Dragões da Independência (1st Guards Regiment) and the elite soldiers of the Colombian National Army are called lanceros.

The Portuguese National Republican Guard horse squadrons carry lances on mounted parades, as do many cavalry regiments in South America such as Chile, Argentina, Bolivia, and Peru.

The modern Italian Regiment "Lancieri di Montebello" (8th) parade detachments armed with the lances carried as combat weapons until 1920.

== See also ==
- Demi-lancer
- Chevau-léger
- Polish cavalry
- Cataphract
- Companion cavalry

== Sources ==
- Barbero, Alessandro, The Battle; A New History of Waterloo, Walker & Co., New York 2005,
- Chappell, Mike (2002). Men at Arms Series British Cavalry Equipment 1800–1941. Men–at–arms No. 138 (revised ed.). Oxford: Osprey Publishing. OCLC 48783714.
