= Stahlrohrlanze =

German cavalry weapon

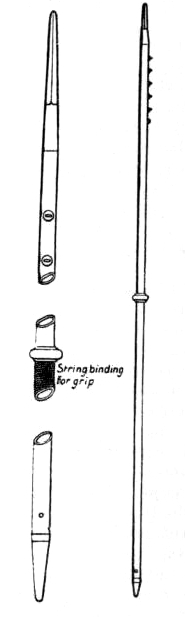
Detail from the 1911 Encyclopaedia Britannica: at right a 6-eyelet M1890; at left detail of an M1890 or M1893nA lance

The Stahlrohrlanze (German: "steel tube lance") was a German cavalry weapon issued in two variants, the M1890 and M1893nA. The German cavalry had been armed with a mixture of weapons until 1889, when it was decided that the entire corps would be issued lances. Initially wooden lances were issued, but in 1890 the first steel-tube lance was introduced. This was a 3.2-metre-long (10 ft) haft, with a 126-millimetre-long (5.0 in) quadrangular spear point. The M1890 has six eyelets below the point, which could be used to attach lance pennons. In 1893, a slightly modified lance, the M1893nA, was introduced. This included a leather tassel which could be used to carry the lance. The pennon eyelets were made larger and reduced to four. The M1890 remained in service with two eyelets removed to resemble the new weapon. The lances remained in use throughout the First World War, until they were removed from field service in 1927.

== M1890 ==
The cavalry of the German Empire underwent a process of standardisation and reorganisation in the late 1880s. As part of this all units were to be issued with lances, previously carried only by uhlans. They were carried by all privates and some non-commissioned officers (NCOs). Those NCOs not issued with lances, and the cavalry officers, continued to be armed with swords. Initially wooden lances were issued, as had been carried previously, but in 1890 a new, all-steel design was introduced. The 1911 edition of the Encyclopaedia Britannica concluded that steel was used because the Germans had difficulty obtaining wooden shafts with which to equip their cavalry. British lancers used bamboo or ash shafts, but the German Empire lacked the former and the encyclopaedia stated that German ash did not grow sufficiently straight for the latter. Uhlans from the province of Silesia continued to carry a wooden lance and were later issued with the M1896 pine-shafted lance.

The M1890 lance (the "Stahlrohrlanze" or "steel tube lance") was the first all-steel lance. It consists of a blackened-steel haft, a bright-steel point and a pointed conical shoe at the base. The latter allowed the lance to be rammed into the earth and stand, point upwards. When ordered to fight dismounted the cavalrymen would drive their lances into the ground at the position where the horses were to be left, with horse-holders, and advance carrying their carbines. The lance measures 3.2 metres (10 ft) in length and the point, square in section, is 126 millimetres (5.0 in) long. A leather grip is attached to the mid-point of the haft, secured by three brass rings. On the haft below the point are six eyelets through which a wire could be threaded to hold a lance pennon. Unit markings, a serial number and royal mark were stamped on two of the opposing faces of the point.

== M1893nA ==
The M1893nA is a slight variation on the M1890. For the first time the haft was made from drawn, soft steel and was 36 millimetres (1.4 in) in diameter. The point, still quadrangular in section, was made slightly thicker. The lance is described by Kruszyński (2021) as measuring 3.2 metres (10 ft 6 in) but by Larson and Yallop (2017) as measuring 10 feet 3 1/2 inches (3.137 m), both sources agree that the lance weighed 2.12 kilograms (4 lb 11 oz). There is a brass handle, lined with cloth, at the mid-point of the lance. One third from the base is a brass ring with leather tassel that was used to carry the lance (the conical base fitted into a leather sleeve at the cavalryman's right stirrup).

In place of the six pennon eyelets of the M1890 the M1893 has four eyelets in hemispherical brass knobs, more substantial than those found in the 1890 model. From 1890 the M1890, which remained in service alongside the newer model, was modified to more closely resemble it, with two of the eyelets being removed. A modified example is held in the collection of the United Kingdom's Royal Armouries. All lances, prior to 1914, were manufactured by Gewehrfabrik Danzig.

All mounted German cavalry (some units were dismounted and fought as infantry) during the First World War were issued with lances. They became the cavalry's only close combat weapon after swords were withdrawn from field service in 1915, remaining so for the rest of the war. The lance continued in service with the cavalry of the post-war Reichswehr, but was withdrawn from field service in 1927. Some cavalry units continued to carry a sword until the end of the Second World War.

== Gallery ==
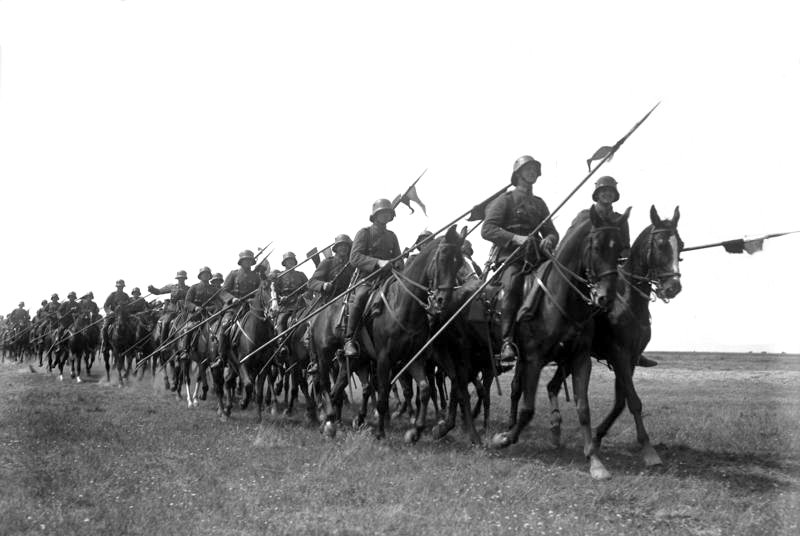
Reichswehr cavalry marching on horseback, while carrying lances, 1932

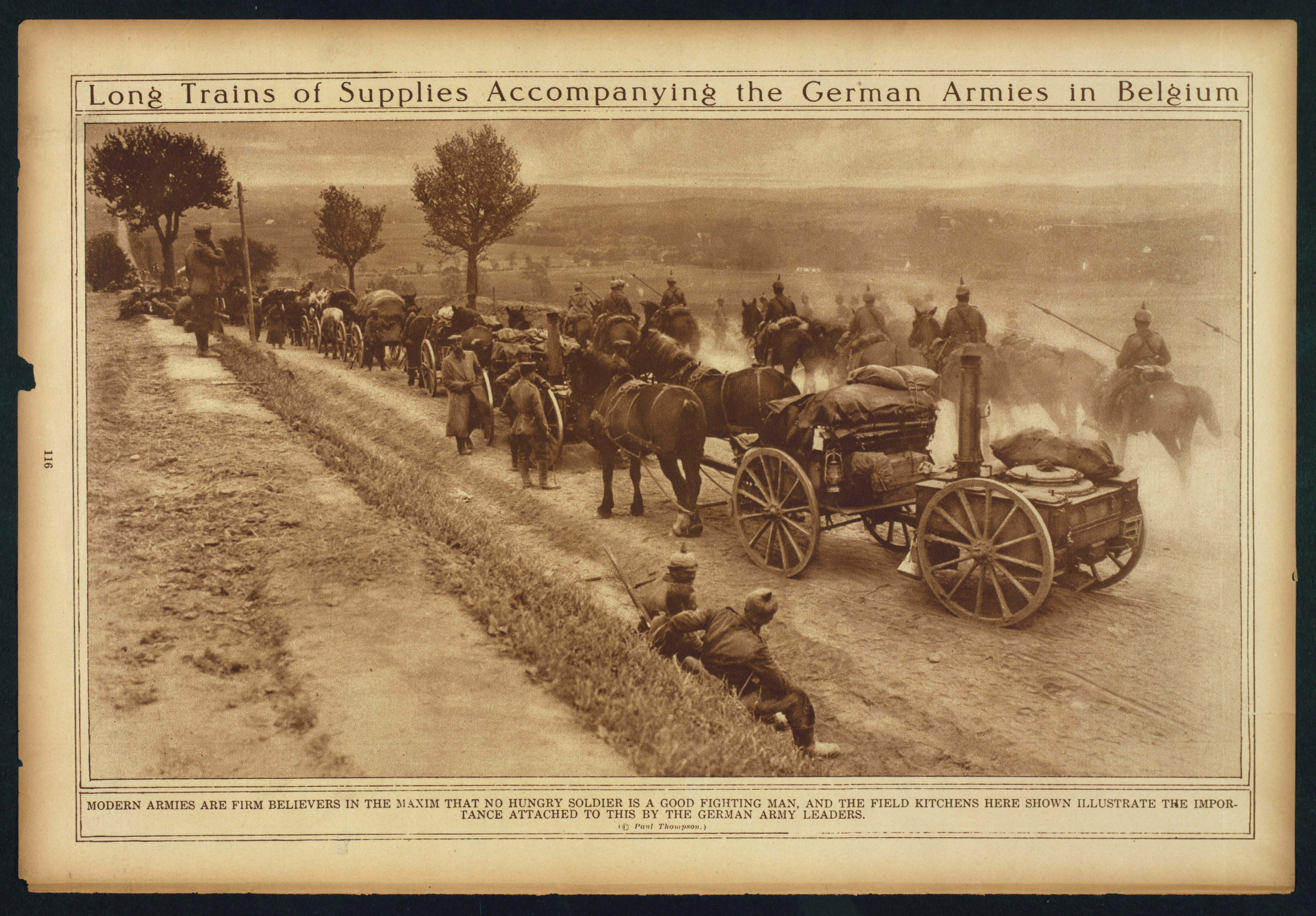
German cavalry with lances on the march, with a field kitchen, during the First World War, 1914

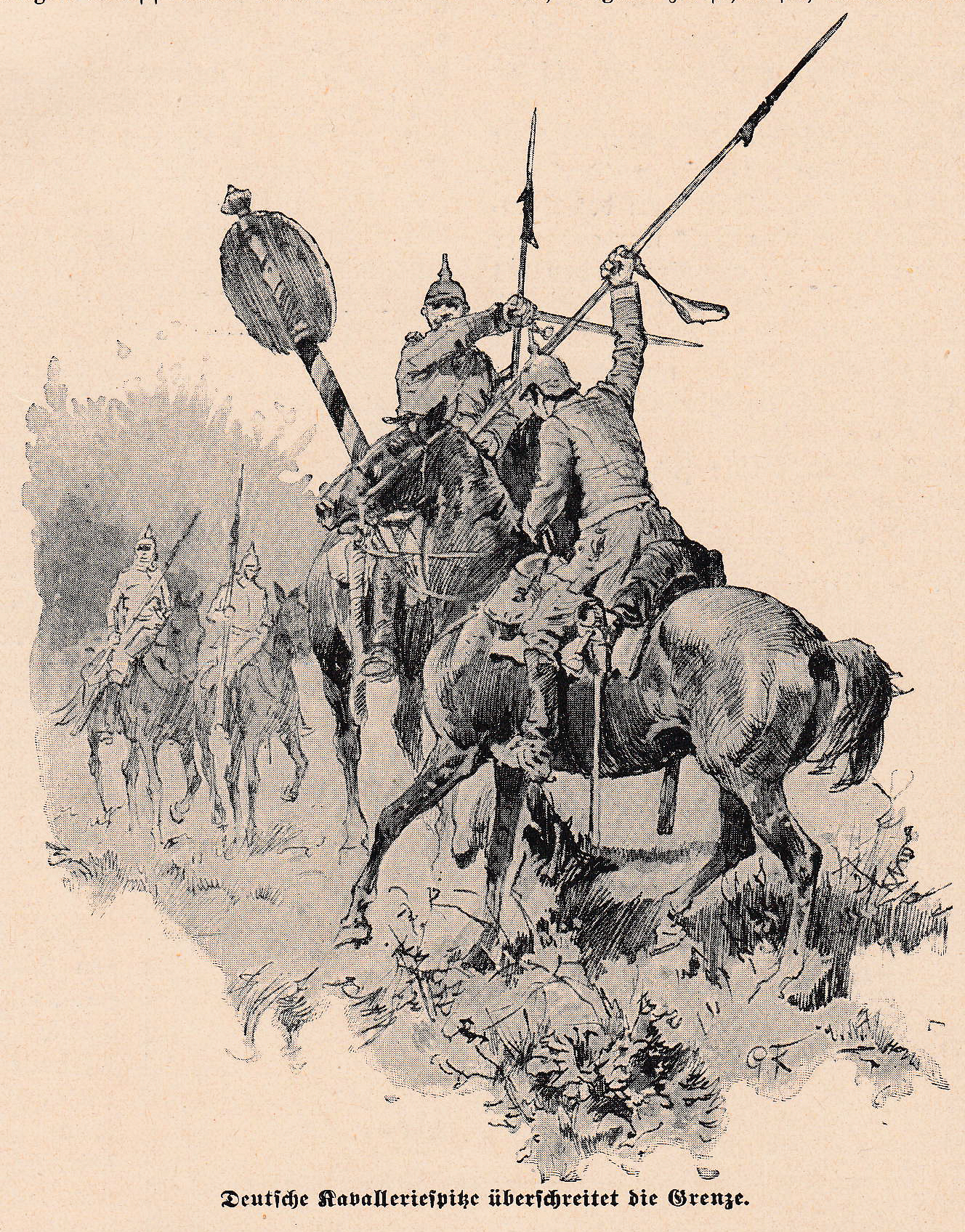
Depiction of German dragoons armed with sabres and lances, taking down a border marker, 1914

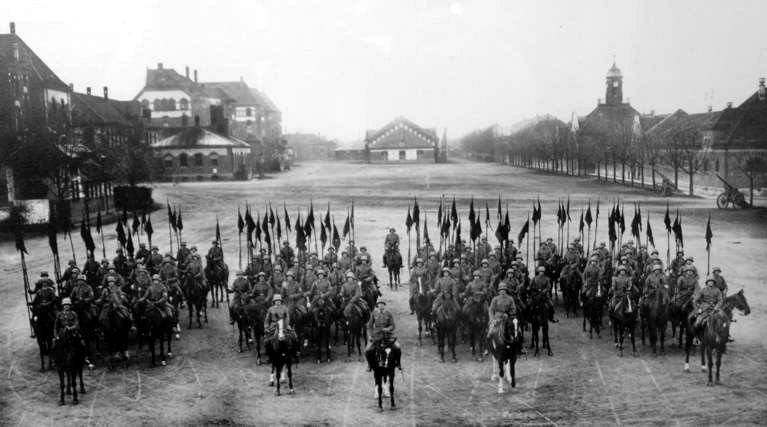
A ceremony to bid farewell to use of the lance as a service weapon, 1927
