= Society of Motherland Friends =

Society of Motherland Friends (pol. Towarzystwo Przyjaciół Ojczyzny) was a secret society of patriotic youth created in Warsaw under the Prussian partition in 1803 by son of starosta (pol. starościc) of Opinogóra Wincenty Krasiński with a help of young aristocrats: Józef Krasiński, Ludwik Pac, Stanisław Małachowski, Henryk Łubieński, Piotr Łubieński and Tomasz Łubieński, and under the protection of the Marshal Stanisław Małachowski, in whose chateau by the Krakowskie Przedmieście street (today Academy of Fine Arts in Warsaw) they held their first meetings. The spiritual patron of the organization (according to Krasiński’s suggestion) was Tadeusz Kościuszko.

The Society members prepared its program, and oath of allegiance. As the organization’s dress, they used black frock coats with black-painted brass buttons ornamented with emblem of anchor and single-world slogan: "hope" (pol. nadzieja). Their idea was, that along with paint erasing the emblem and slogan should be more and more visible, what had to symbolize the return of the independence. However after some time the Society changed into social coterie of an amusement character.

From the very beginning patriotic activity of the Society was endangered by the stiff competition with "Blacha", as people of Warsaw called roistering youths grouped around Copper-Roof Palace (quarters of prince Józef Poniatowski), who wore green frock coats with "Jabłonna" inscription on their collars. Both coteries competed with each other in splendour of banquets, night drinking-boats, and instant duels, toward which activities Prussian invaders turned a blind eye, glad to see progressive demoralization of Polish noble youth. However, as political situation in Europe has been changed, Prussian administration changed its view of Polish organizations and societies suspecting that they were sources of pro-French activity. In the beginning of 1806 Prussian governor Köhler ordered Krasiński to dissolve the Society.

After one year its members became a nucleus of the so-called "Polish Honour Guard" of Napoleon, and next the cadre of the Polish 1st Light Cavalry Regiment of the Imperial Guard.
