= Jan Kozietulski =

Polish noble (1781–1821)

Baron Jan Kozietulski
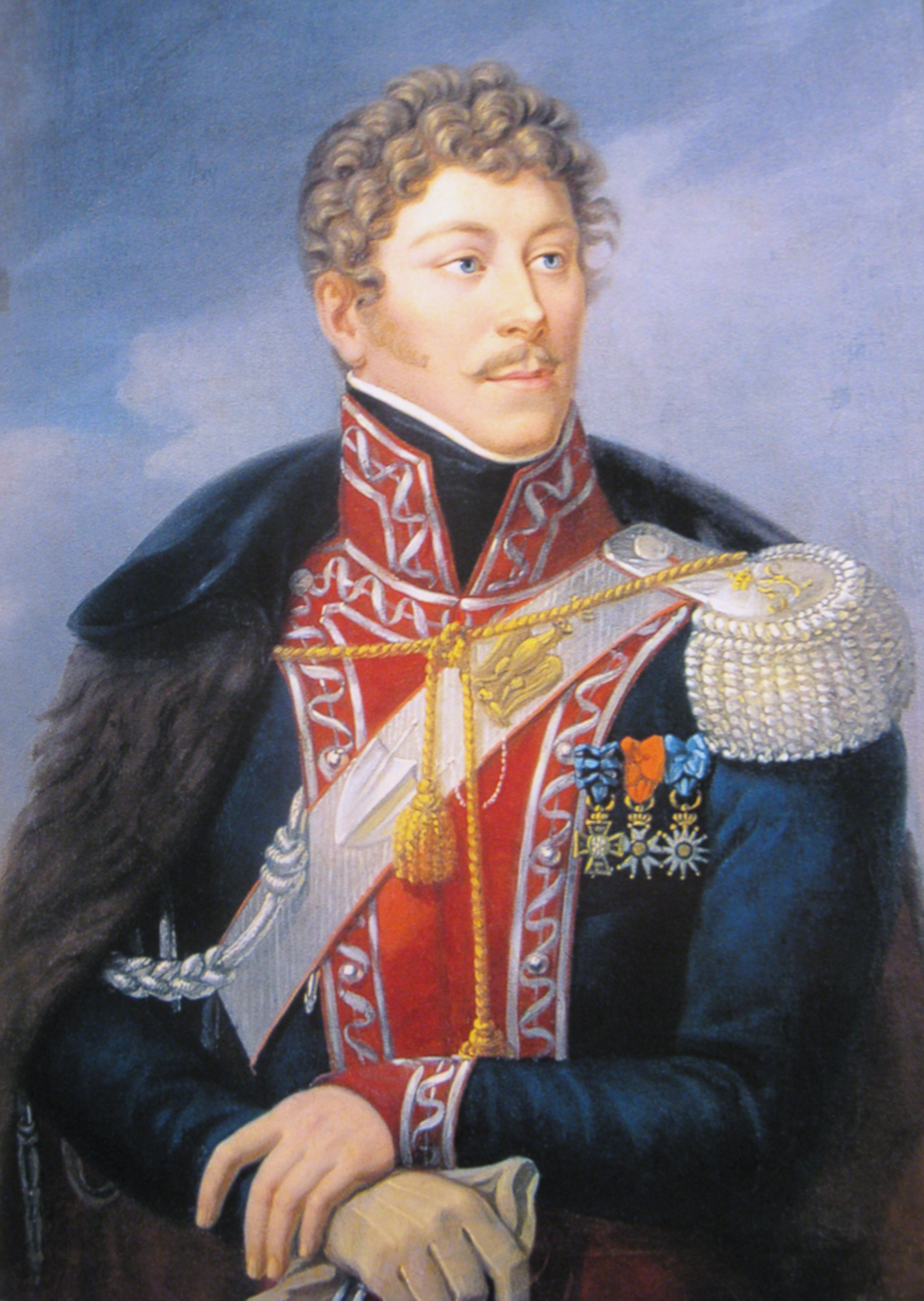
- Born: 4 July 1781; Skierniewice, Polish–Lithuanian Commonwealth
- Died: 3 February 1821 (aged 39); Warsaw, Poland
- Military career
- Allegiance: Duchy of Warsaw; First French Empire; Congress Poland
- Branch: Army of the Duchy of Warsaw; French Imperial Army; Army of Congress Poland
- Service years: c. 1806–1821
- Rank: Colonel
- Units: 1st Light Cavalry Lancers Regiment of the Imperial Guard (Polish); Warsaw Honour Guard
- Commands: 3e régiment des éclaireurs de la Garde impériale
- Conflicts: Napoleonic Wars; War of the Fourth Coalition; Battle of Pułtusk (1806); Battle of Eylau; Peninsular War; Battle of Somosierra; War of the Fifth Coalition; Battle of Wagram; French invasion of Russia; Battle of Maloyaroslavets (WIA); War of the Sixth Coalition; Battle of Leipzig; Battle of Paris (1814)
- Awards: Baron of the Empire; Order of St. Anna; Virtuti Militari; Knight of the Legion of Honour

Baron Jan Leon Hipolit Kozietulski (4 July 1781 – 3 February 1821) was a Polish noble, military commander and an officer of the armed forces of the Duchy of Warsaw during the Napoleonic Wars. He is best remembered as the heroic commander of the Polish cavalry charge at the Battle of Somosierra.

== Biography ==
Jan Leon Hipolit Kozietulski was born 4 July 1781 in Skierniewice in the Polish–Lithuanian Commonwealth. A friend of Wincenty Krasiński, Kozietulski joined the Warsaw Honour Guard, with which he took part in the Battle of Pułtusk and the Battle of Eylau. A distinguished cavalryman, in April 1807 he became the commanding officer of the 3rd Squadron of the Polish 1st Light Cavalry Regiment of the Imperial Guard, commanded by Krasiński. In March 1808 Kozietulski reached Spain with his unit, where he took part in the Peninsular War.

=== Success in Spain and in Austria ===
During the Battle of Somosierra, Kozietulski was the commander who led the Polish cavalry against the Spanish artillery and infantry. Although not the only commander present during the charge, he was credited with the victory after the battle and in Poland remains the best-known veteran of that campaign. He was also one of 18 Poles to be awarded the French Legion of Honour after the battle. Following the Peninsular War Kozietulski remained in the military and distinguished himself in the Battle of Wagram, where he led the Polish cavalry unit against other Polish cavalry units fighting alongside the Austrians. For his merits, in 1811 he became a Baron of the Empire.

=== Russia and saving Napoleon's life ===
During Napoleon's invasion of Russia, Kozietulski again distinguished himself as a skilled commander during the Battle of Maloyaroslavets of October 25, 1812, where he saved the life of Napoleon himself, by charging between the Emperor and the assaulting Cossacks. His uniform, pierced with a lance and stained with blood, is preserved to this day in the Museum of the Polish Army in Warsaw. After recovering from his wounds he returned to active service and took part in all major battles of Napoleonic 1813 campaign in Saxony. He also took part in the Battle of Nations. In 1814 he was made the commander of the French 3rd Scout Regiment of the Imperial Guard (French: 3e régiment des éclaireurs de la Garde impériale) and fought in the Battle of Paris in 1814.

=== Later life in Poland ===
After Napoleon's defeat, Kozietulski returned to the Russian-held Polish Kingdom, where he became commander of the Polish 4th Uhlan Regiment. He died on 3 February 1821 in Warsaw, three months before Napoleon died on the Saint Helena island.

== Awards ==
In 1811, Kozietulski became a baron of the French Empire.

- Order of St. Anna (Russian Empire)
- Virtuti Militari
- Knight of the Légion d'honneur, awarded on December 13, 1809
- Cross of Valour (Krzyz Walecznych)

== See also ==
- Battle of Somosierra, French victory
- Józef Poniatowski, Polish general, minister of war and army chief, who became a Marshal of the French Empire during the Napoleonic Wars.
- Battle of Wagram, French victory
