= 1st Light Cavalry Lancers Regiment of the Imperial Guard (Polish) =

- 1er Régiment de chevau-légers lanciers de la Garde impériale (polonais); 1. Pułk Szwoleżerów-Lansjerów Gwardii Cesarskiej (Polski)
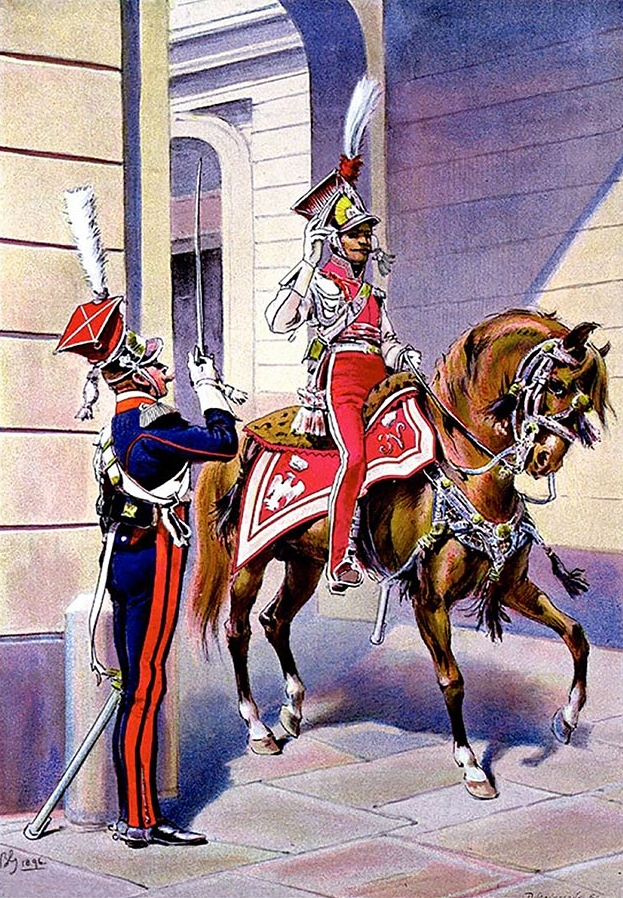
- A Polish lancer of the Imperial Guard salutes a superior officer of the regiment. Illustration by Bronislaw Gembarzewski, 1896.
- Active: April 1807 – May 1814 (1814–1815 for one squadron)
- Disbanded: 1 October 1815
- Country: French Empire
- Allegiance: Napoleon I
- Branch: French Imperial Army
- Type: Light cavalry Lancers
- Role: Reconnaissance; Close protection
- Size: Regiment of 1,000 men
- Part of: Imperial Guard
- Dépôt: Chantilly, Oise
- March: "The Polish Lancers" (Les Lanciers Polonais)
- Equipment: Lance (from 1809)
- Engagements: Napoleonic Wars; War of the Fourth Coalition; Battle of Pułtusk; Peninsular War; Dos de Mayo Uprising; Battle of Somosierra; War of the Fifth Coalition; Battle of Essling; Battle of Wagram; Invasion of Russia; Battle of Smolensk; Battle of Borodino; Battle of the Berezina; War of the Sixth Coalition; Battle of Lützen; Battle of Leipzig; Battle of Hanau; Battle of Reims; Battle of Paris; War of the Seventh Coalition; Battle of Ligny; Battle of Waterloo

Commanders
- Notable commanders: Wincenty Krasiński; Ambroży Mikołaj Skarżyński

The 1st Polish Light Cavalry Lancers Regiment of the Imperial Guard (French: 1er régiment de chevau-légers lanciers de la Garde impériale (polonais); Polish: 1. Pułk Szwoleżerów-Lansjerów Gwardii Cesarskiej (Polski)) was a foreign Polish light cavalry lancers regiment which served as part of Napoleon's Imperial Guard during the Napoleonic Wars. The regiment fought in many battles, distinguishing itself at Wagram, Berezina, Hanau and especially Somosierra. On at least three occasions, light-cavalrymen of the regiment saved Napoleon's life.

== Origins ==
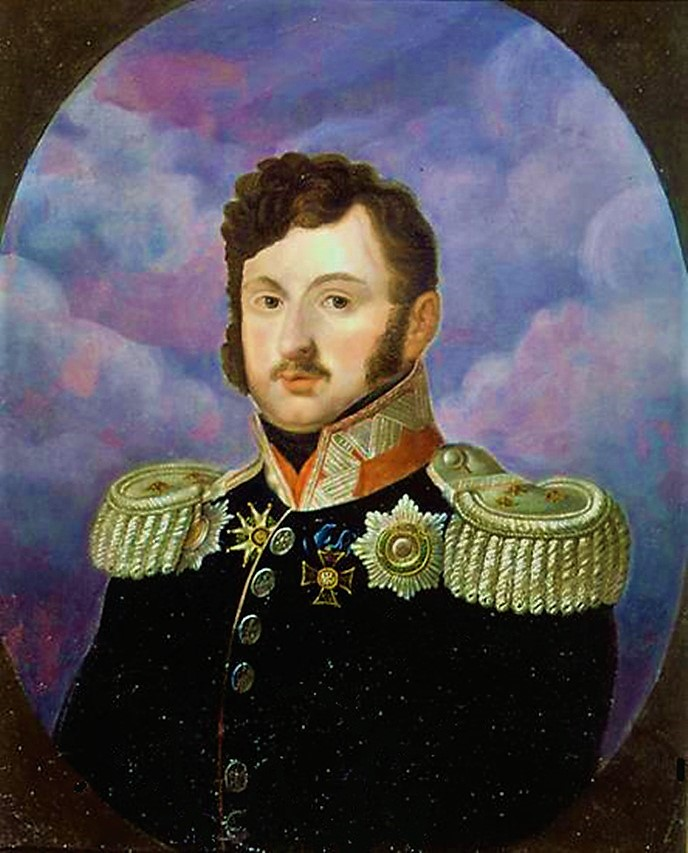
Wincenty Krasiński as the general of the Congress Poland Army

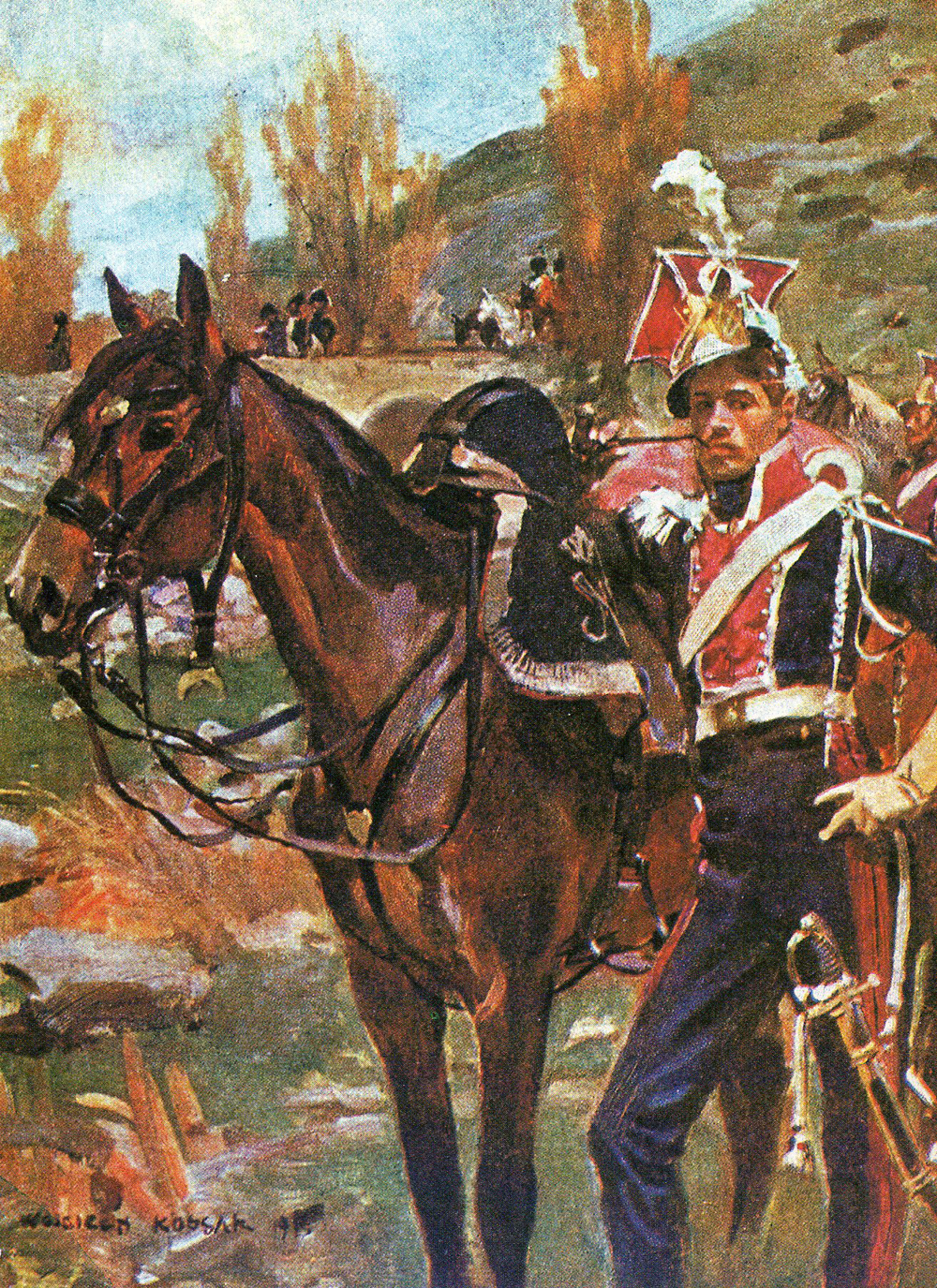
A Polish lancer

The Polish 1st Light Cavalry Regiment of the Imperial Guard, under the command of Wincenty Krasiński, was created by a decree of Napoleon's, and signed on 9 April 1807 in Finckenstein (now Kamieniec Suski in northeast Poland):

From our field quarters in Finkenstein on the 6th day of April 1807.

We, Napoleon I, Emperor of the French and King of Italy, have determined as follow:

Art. 1st. Polish Light Cavalry (Chevaux-légers) Regiment of the Guard will be formed.

Art. 2nd. Regiment will consist of four squadrons, each of two companies.

Art. 3rd. Each company will consist of one captain, two lieutenants, two sub-lieutenants, one sergeant major, six sergeants, one corporal-quartermaster, ten corporals, ninety-six cavalrymen, three trumpeters, two blacksmiths.

Art. 4th. Regimental Staff will consist of one colonel, two French majors of the Guard, four squadron commanders, one quartermaster-treasurer, one French instructor-captain from the Guard, two French adjutant-majors from the Guard, four sub-adjutant-majors from among the Poles, who formerly were on duty in Legions in France, one standard-bearer, four surgeons, two of them 1st class and two 2nd or 3rd, one sub-instructor in the rank of sergeant major, one staff trumpeter, two trumpeter-corporals, one tailor, one breecher, one shoemaker, one gunsmith, one saddlemaker, one armourer, two blacksmiths.

Art. 5th. To be enlisted into the Chevauleger Corps one has to be a landowner or the son of a landowner, be more than 18 years old, and less than 40, and come with his own horse, uniform, caparison and other equipment according to the regulations; men, who can not afford immediately deliver a horse, uniform, caparison and equipment, will be paid in advance. Horse has to be a maximum 4 feet and 9 inches, and a minimum 4 feet and 6 inches tall.

Art. 6th. Polish Chevaux-legers of the Guard will have to fulfill the same duties as Chasseurs of the Guard. They will be able to obtain food, forage, and payments, which will be established by the Colonel General, commanding officer of all cavalry of the Guard.

Art. 7th. Cost of the initial equipment, as will be established by the Administrative Board for those who have not enough money, 15 sous will be deducted daily until the termination of the pay.

Art. 8th. Administrative Board book-keeping and Registre-Matricule will be organized in the same fashion as in other cavalry regiments of the Guard.

Art. 9th. Men, who want to be enrolled in the Chevaulegers of the Guard, have to immediately present themselves to Prince Poniatowski, director of the Department of War of the Duchy of Warsaw, and explain before him their serviceableness, according to the Article 5th. Next they have to present themselves to a Major chosen to organize the regiment, who – after examination – will incorporate candidates to the regiment, and note their age, description, country of origin, names of father and mother. Annotations will be presented for our acceptation.

Art. 10th. Our Ministry of War has obtained an order to fulfill this decree.

== Beginning ==
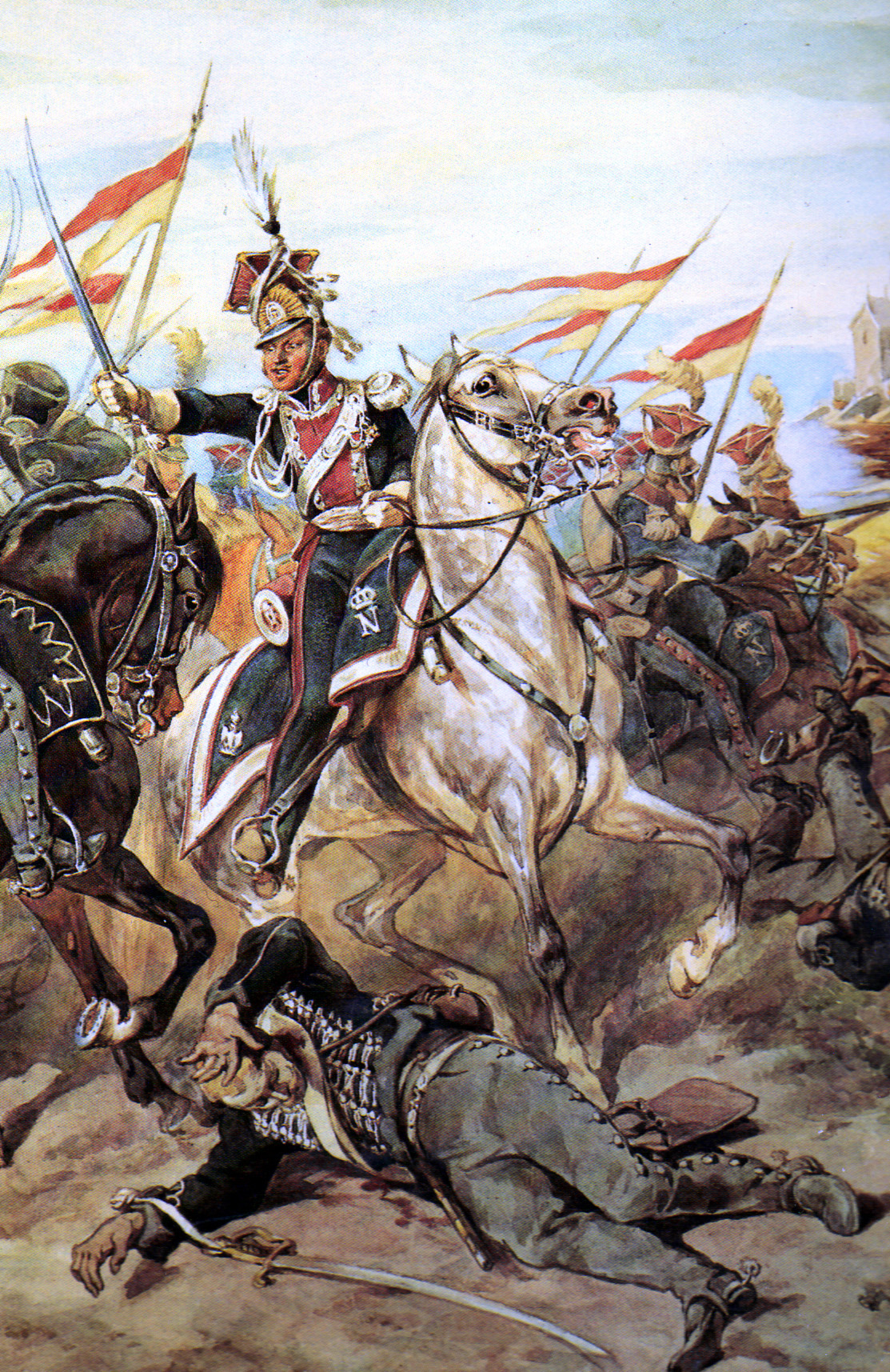
Light horse in combat, by Juliusz Kossak. Lance-pennons should have been red on top, white (not yellow) on bottom.

Polish efforts to form a prestigious detachment of the Imperial Guard began in 1804. Napoleon agreed to this during the Polish Campaign of 1806, when he was escorted by a "Polish Honor Guard" comprising aristocratic youths from the Society of Friends of the Fatherland, leaders of which would in the future be officers of the regiment. Aspiring Guardsmen distinguished themselves in the Battles of Pułtusk and Gołymin. It is unclear whether Napoleon's reason in agreeing to the regiment's formation was a desire to control the Polish aristocracy (whose loyalty he could not be sure of) or his appreciation of the Polish contributions to his victories.

The regiment was an elite body of volunteers in respect of income and origin—peasants were not eligible to enlist. The cadre were drawn almost exclusively from aristocratic and wealthy noble families; most of the rank-and-file soldiers were also noblemen, though burghers—including Jews—were also represented. Some veterans were upset to learn that their officers were callow youths.

In June 1807, the first company of the first squadron was ready to leave Warsaw's Mirów Barracks. Earlier, 125 light cavalry under Captain Tomasz Łubieński had presented themselves to the public and won their acclaim.

== Organisation, uniforms and armament ==
According to intentional Ordre de Bataille Wincenty Krasiński (father of Polish poet Zygmunt Krasiński), was nominated as the commanding officer of the regiment. COs of four squadrons were appointed: Tomasz Łubieński, Ferdynand Stokowski, Jan Kozietulski and Henryk Kamieński. Each squadron was composed of two companies (demi-squadrons) of 125 chevaulegers each. Each company consisted of five troops.

Among troop commanders were: Antoni Potocki, Paweł Jerzmanowski, Łukasz Wybicki (son of Józef Wybicki), Józef Szymanowski, Józef Jankowski, Seweryn Fredro. Positions of Lieutenant-Colonels (grossmajors) and instructors were taken by Frenchmen: Charles Delaitre of the Mamelukes of the Imperial Guard, and Pierre "Papa" Dautancourt of Choice Gendarmerie. The regiment consisted of 60 officers and about 1000 men. In 1812 a fifth squadron under Paweł Jerzmanowski was formed. In the beginning of 1813 remnants of 3rd Lithuanian Light Cavalry, detachment of Lithuanian gendarmes, and a company of Lithuanian Tartars were included, so the number of companies rose to 13. During May and June of the same year the number of companies rose to 15 (117 officers and 1,775 men), but in December the original organization was restored – 4 squadrons and 8 companies. 3rd Scout Regiment of the Guard under Jan Kozietulski was formed from the remaining officers and men. Polish chevaux-legers were treated as French soldiers and were on the French payroll. In 1809 (after the Battle of Somosierra) the regiment was incorporated to the Old Guard.

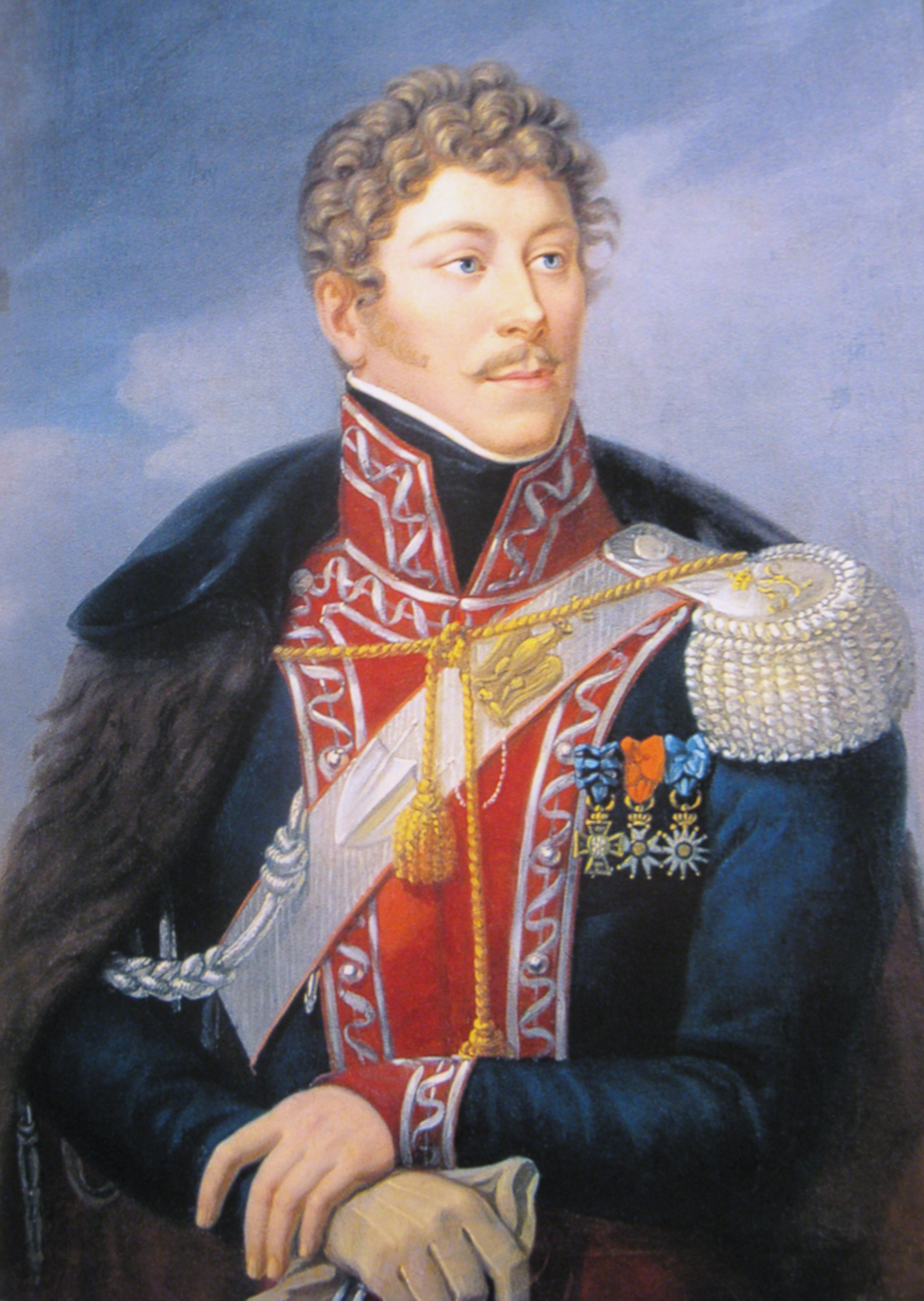
Jan Kozietulski in light horse uniform

According to the Old Guard seniority they were located after Chasseurs à Cheval, but before Mamelukes. After Napoleon's abdication (6 April 1814) chevaulegers and scouts were united (minus Paweł Jerzmanowski's squadron, which accompanied the former emperor to Elba). 1 May 1814 the regiment was transferred from the French Army to the newly created Army of Congress Poland, and on 7 June all squadrons were presented in Saint-Denis before their new Commander, Grand Duke Konstantin Pavlovich of Russia and then moved to Poland.

Uniforms of chevaulegers were modelled upon National Cavalry uniforms from the last decade of the 18th century. Dark blue kurtka had crimson stand-up collar, wristbands and facings. The snug dark blue pantaloons (breeches) were lined with leather, and ornamented with a single crimson stripe. Collar and facings of the Grand Uniform were ornamented also with silver wavy line, and pantaloons with double crimson stripes (officer's Gala Full Dress was white and crimson). High (22 cm) czapkas had their forehead metals made of brass (officer's of silver) with a rising sun and the letter "N". For the parade czapka was crowned with 47 cm long plume of heron's or ostrich white feathers, and a cockade with a blue center, broad crimson middle band and a narrow white outer edging, with the blue practically hidden under the silver Maltese cross. Officers had blue, while regular soldiers had off-white overcoats, known as manteau-capotes.

Chevaulegers were armed with sabres, initially Prussian of bad quality, and as of March 1809 French sabres. Also, Prussian pistols were replaced gradually with French mousquetonnes. Lances, 2.75 meters long with crimson-and-white pennons, were obtained not earlier than after the Battle of Wagram, where they acquired lances of Austrian uhlans, and fought victoriously with these. At that time the name of the regiment was changed to (fr. 1er Régiment de chevau-légers lanciers Polonais de la Garde Impériale).

The regimental song was "Marsz trębaczy" (‘’Trumpeters March’’):

Witamy was, witamy was,
Jeżeliście nasi kochajcie nas, kochajcie nas.

Witamy was, witamy was,
Jeżeliście wrogi szanujcie nas, szanujcie nas.

Do zwycięstw przywykli wkraczamy do was,
Obejścia wzglęgnego żądamy po was,
A wy się nic złego, a wy się nic złego
Nie bójcie od nas!

Do zwycięstw przywykli wkraczamy do was,
Polacy po świecie wojujemy was!
My za Polskę naszą i za sławę naszą
Wojujemy was!

Translation:

We greet you, We greet you,
If you are friends, love us, love us.

We greet you, We greet you,
If you are enemies, respect us, respect us.

To victories accustomed, we're entering your lands,
And only respect we're awaiting from you,
So nothing evil, nothing evil will you
have to fear from us!

To victories accustomed, we're entering your lands,
We Poles in the world are warring you!
For our Poland and for our glory
Are we warring you!

== Operational history ==
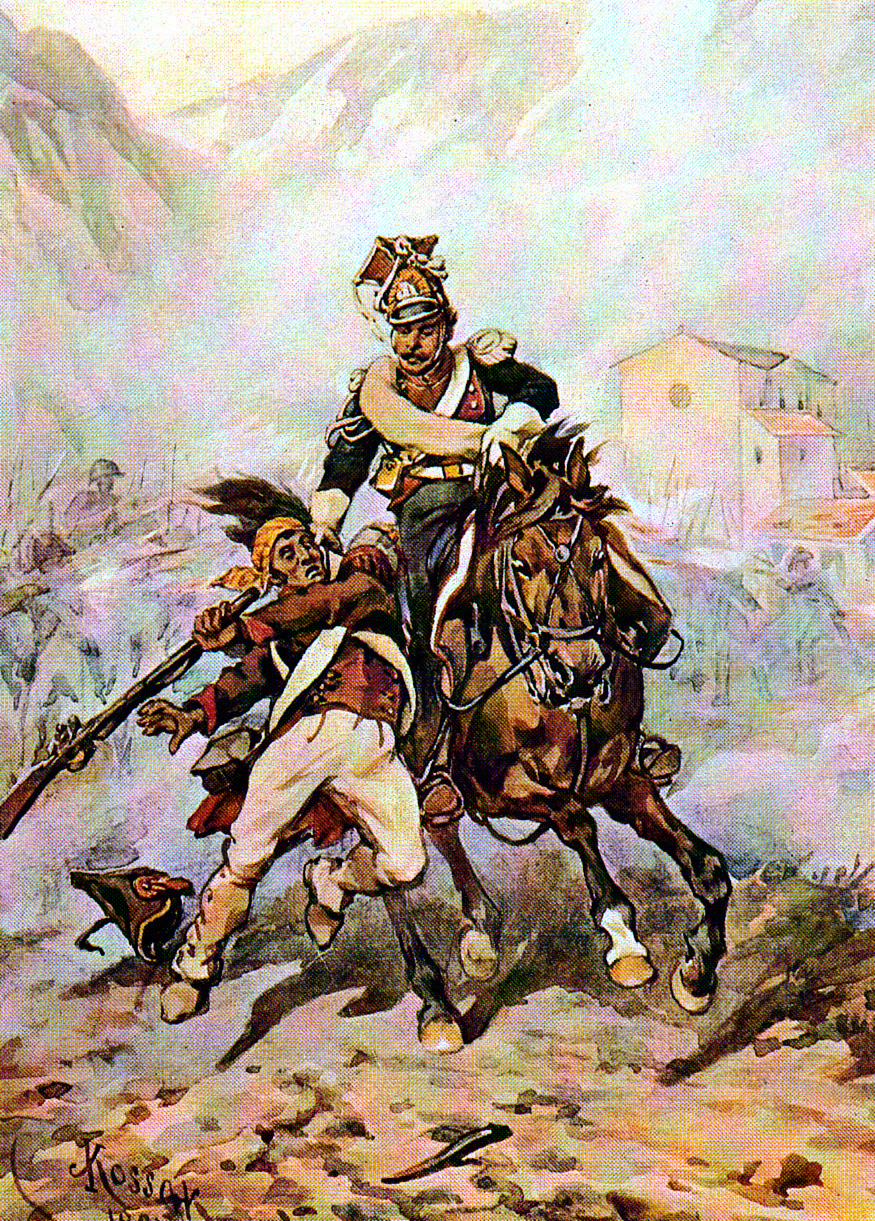
Light-horseman in summer field uniform during the Spanish Campaign, by Juliusz Kossak

=== Spain ===
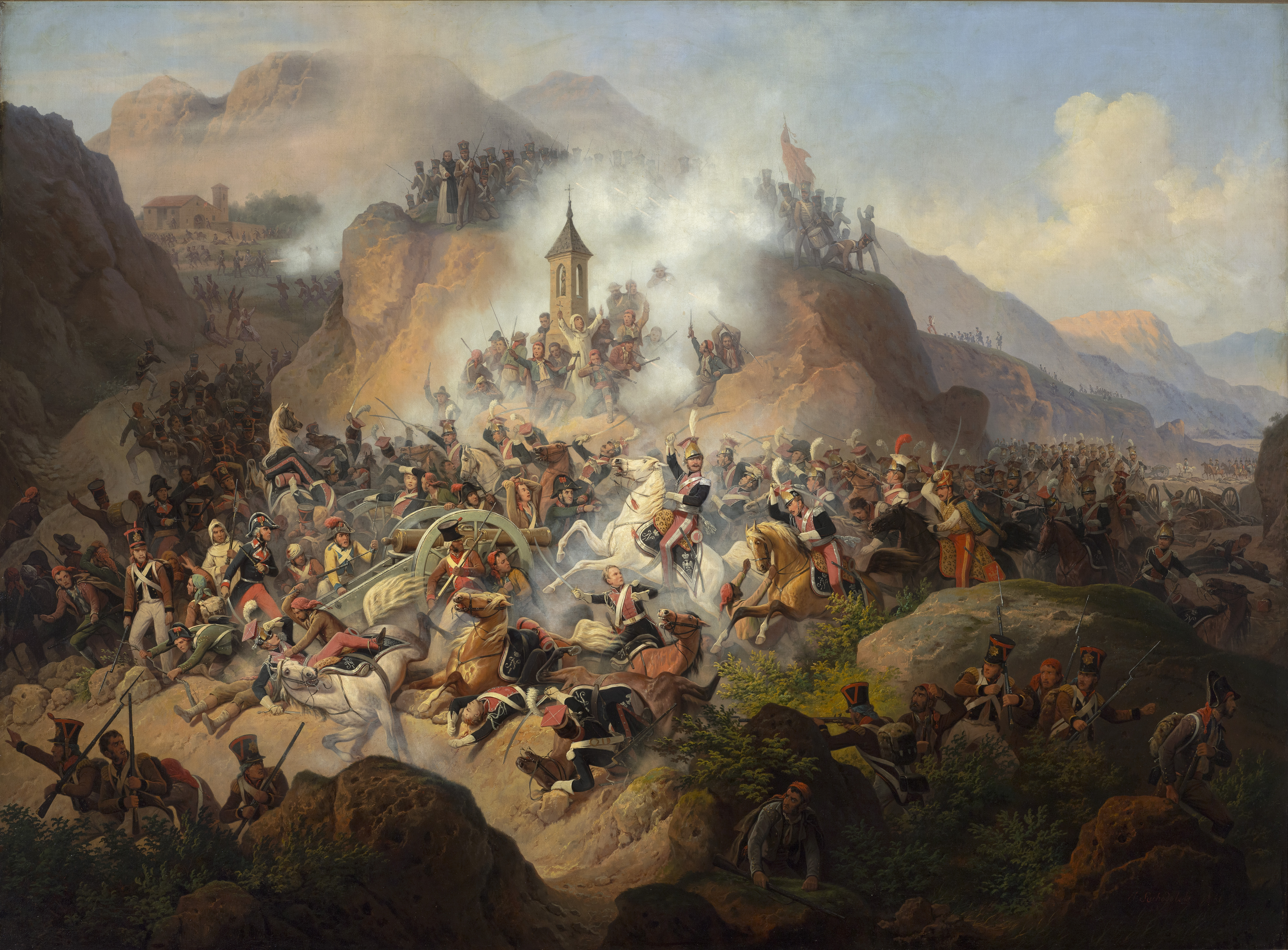
Painting of the charge of the Polish Light Horse at Somosierra by January Suchodolski.

The regiment was sent, detachment after detachment, to Spain. The first time chevaulegers fought was on 14 July 1808, during the Battle of Medina de Rioseco (two squadrons under Radzimiński).

On 30 November 1808 their most famous charge up the Somosierra Pass took place. That day the 3rd Squadron under Kozietulski (ad interim) was on duty as a personal escort to the Emperor. After the failure of the French infantry attack, Napoleon ordered Polish chevaulegers to take the pass defended by 3,000 men and four batteries of Spanish cannons. The narrow road to the top (300 meters level difference, 2,500 meters long), bordered from both sides with waist high stone walls, lined with poplar trees, precluded a demi-squadron or even a troop frontal attack. This was why the attack was conducted in a column four horses wide. After the first battery was taken, chevaulegers, without slowing the full gallop charge, gained the top of the pass in about eight minutes. All four batteries were taken, and the road to Madrid opened for Napoleon's Army. The charge was led by Kozietulski who, however, lost his horse after taking the first battery. The squadron was then joined by Lt. Andrzej Niegolewski, who had previously been on reconnaissance with his troop. The charge was continued under Dziewanowski, and when he fell from his horse after taking the third battery, by Piotr Krasiński. The charge, which continued to the last battery, was led by Niegolewski, who miraculously survived when the Spanish attacked him (he received nine wounds from bayonets and two carbine shots to the head).

According to the official version, Kozietulski led his men into the charge with the standard French war cry "En avant, vive l'Empereur!". However, according to the memoirs of many of the veterans the true battle cry was (in Polish) "Naprzód psiekrwie, Cesarz patrzy!" (Forward, you sons of dogs, the Emperor is watching!).

The charge has been noted as the most effective victory of the Polish cavalry during the time of the Napoleonic Wars, and as the least costly victory for Napoleon. It became a legend and later an inspiration for many writers and painters.

Soon after the battle the regiment was - by Napoleon's decree - included in the Old Guard. It stayed in Spain until February 1809. It took its part in the retaking of Madrid, and in Marshal Soult's campaign against Coalition forces in Portugal. Hundred chevaulegers under Tomasz Łubieński escorted Napoleon on his way back to Paris.

=== 1809–1811 ===
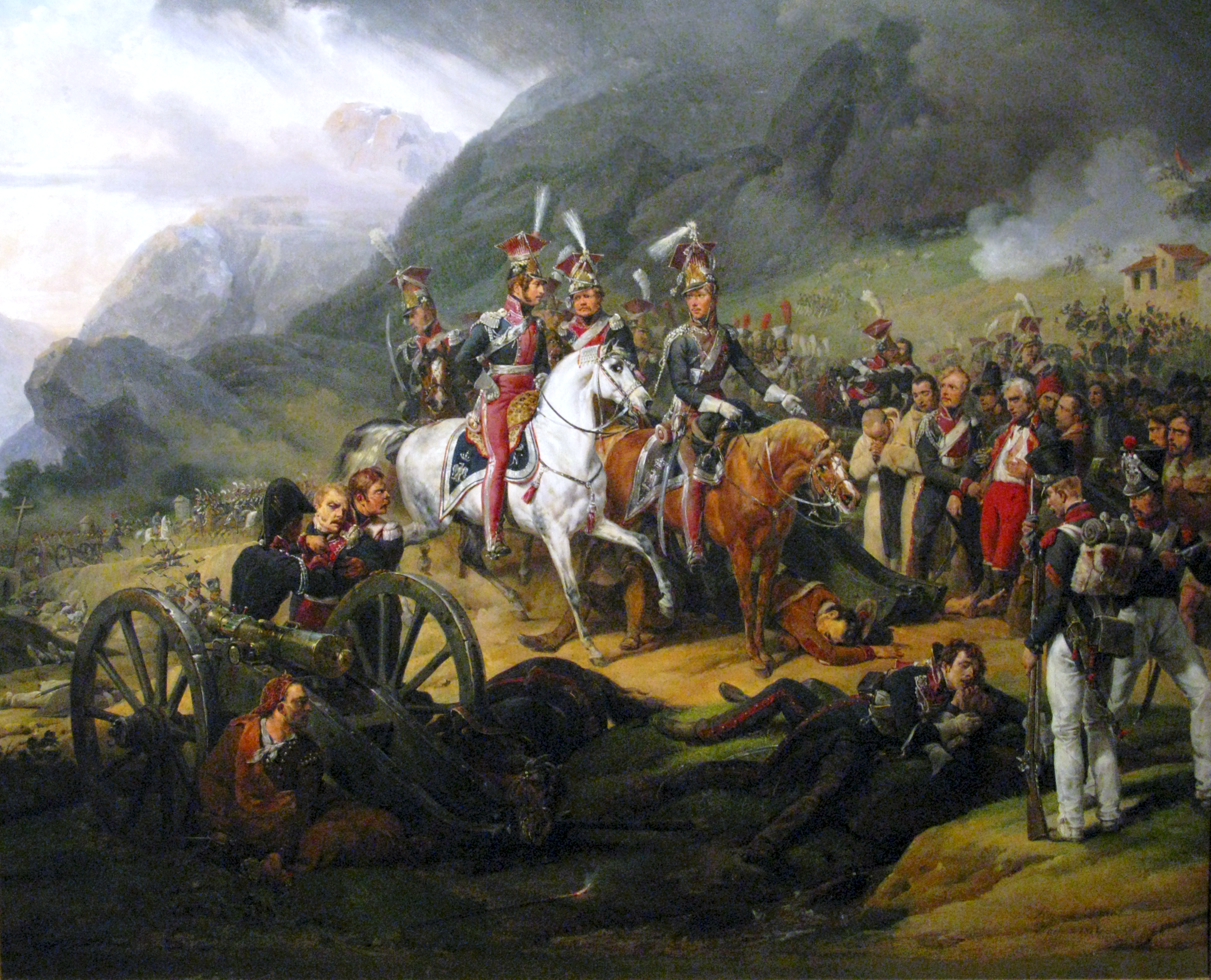
Wincenty Krasiński at the Somosierra Pass, by Horace Vernet, incorrectly showing light horse parade uniforms

In the spring of 1809 the War of the Fifth Coalition began. The regiment marched to Austria. On 22 May the light horse took part in the Battle of Aspern-Essling.

On 6 July 1809, during the Battle of Wagram, the light horse again led a charge that enhanced their legend. In one daring attack, they smashed Duke Schwarzenberg's uhlans and prevented the whole army from being separated from the banks of the Danube river. During the melee, they grabbed the uhlans’ lances and continued their attack further with these new weapons. Most of Schwarzenberg's uhlans were Poles from Galicia. After the battle, Napoleon supposedly said: "Give them these lances, if they can use them so well." From this point on, they became light-horse lancers.

Over the next two years (1810–11) the Regiment spent time in Chantilly resting, drilling, receiving awards, and from time to time participating in court duties. Some 400 lancers escorted the Emperor and his wife on their trip to Belgium, and Napoleon during his visit to the maritime provinces. Kozietulski was awarded the officer's star of the Legion of Honour together with the title of baron, and was nominated for the Polish cross of Virtuti Militari. Wincenty Krasiński was appointed brigadier-general and was created a count. Many other officers and men obtained promotions and awards for gallantry.

=== Russia ===
In February 1812 the Regiment was ordered to go to Germany and further east. On March 11 it stopped in Toruń. Then on June 21 (enlarged by the fifth squadron which was formed in Poznań) it crossed the eastern border of the Duchy of Warsaw. On the very next day Napoleon issued in Vilkaviškis his order, which began the French invasion of Russia, that was also called the Second Polish War.

In the first stage of the war the Regiment was assigned to the Headquarters of the Emperor, and one squadron was the personal guard of Marshal Davout. Chevaulegers acted from time to time as a military police unit. They also fought near Vilnius, Mogilev and Smolensk. During the Battle of Borodino they were kept in reserve. Only one squadron went to Moscow with Napoleon (the rest of them followed a few days later). Some fifty chevaulegers-lancers escorted the Emperor from the burning Kremlin, covering him - in the most critical moment - with their overcoats. With their experience of the severity of winters in Eastern Europe, the chevaulegers, when leaving Moscow, had their horses fitted with ice-horseshoes.

The high morale and discipline of the chevaulegers was especially obvious during the retreat of the Grande Armée. The Regiment was one of very few detachments which remained battle-ready until the end. On 25 October it fought at Borovsk and Maloyaroslavets against the Cossacks. The same day a service squadron saved Napoleon, about to be kidnapped by Cossacks near Horodnia. On 17 November chevaulegers took part in the Battle of Krasnoi, and 28 November in the Battle of Berezina. On 5 December Napoleon left the Army rushing for Paris. He was escorted to Ashmyany by the 7th company of chevaulegers (newly formed). The rest of the regiment escorted the imperial treasure, and reached Vilnius on 9 December. During the campaign the regiment suffered tremendous losses. In the end of December there were only 374 men with 270 horses. However, its numbers were still larger than of the other cavalry detachments of the Guard. Chevaulegers gained the great respect of their enemies. Cossacks, who in the last weeks of the retreat presented a real threat to the remnants of the Grande Armée, often escaped at the sight of chevaulegers.

=== 1813–1815 ===
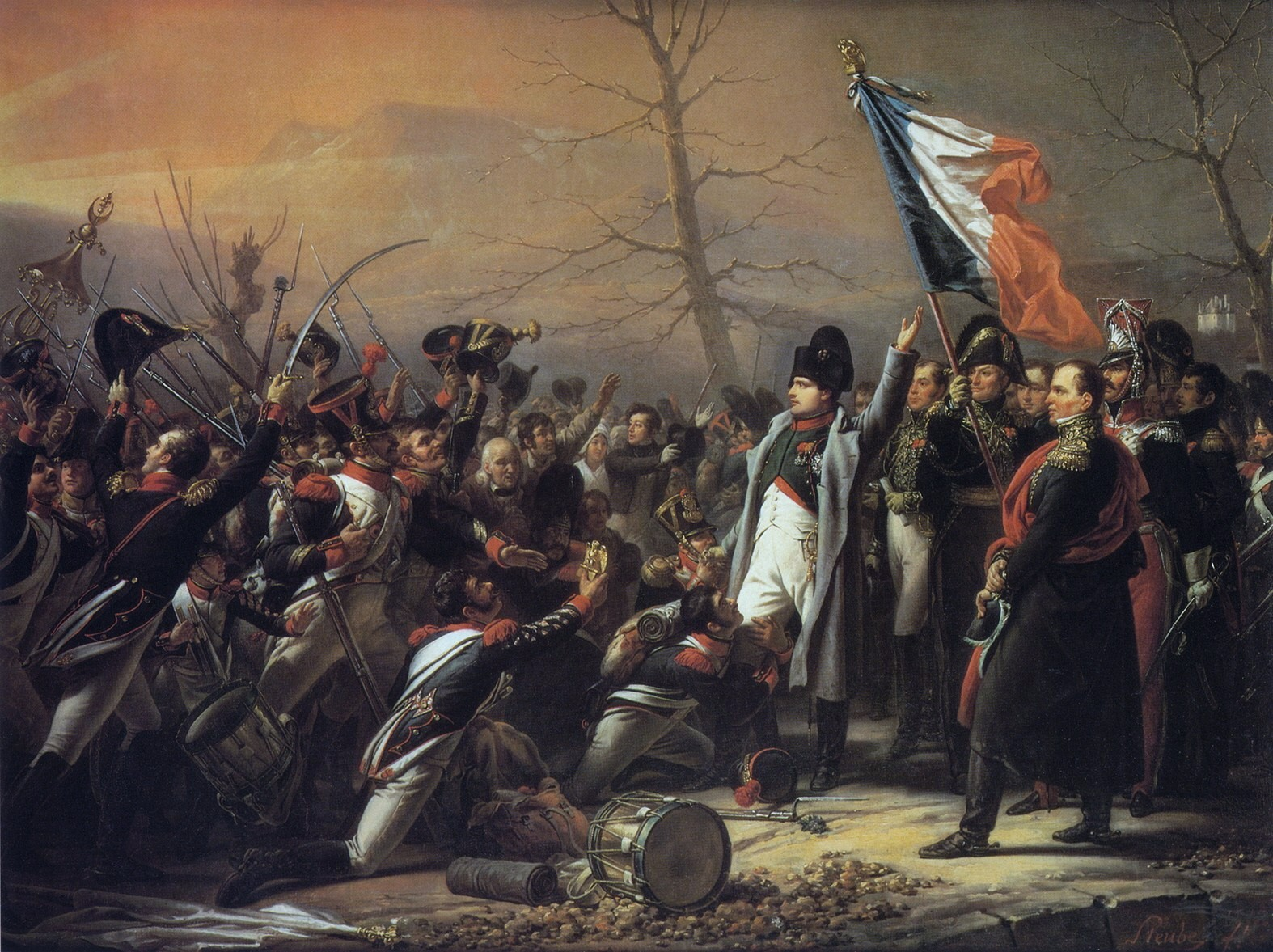
Napoleon's Return from Elba by Charles de Steuben. Paweł Jerzmanowski is at far right.

During the German campaign of 1813 the regiment was fighting, but at the same time was being reorganized. In spring four squadrons (under Wincenty Krasiński, Dominik Radziwiłł, Paweł Jerzmanowski, Dezydery Chłapowski) fought battles at Lützen, Bautzen and Reichenbach. On 12 July the renovated regiment of seven squadrons was incorporated into the new Grande Armée. This time it was divided into two parts: six companies were attached to the division of the Old Guard under General Walther. Eight younger companies, plus a company of Tartars, were included into the 2nd light cavalry division of General Lefebvre. The first regiment accompanied Napoleon. On September 16 at Peterswalde they smashed a regiment of Prussian hussars under the son of General Blücher. In the Battle of Leipzig both regiments took part. After this battle even "old breed" chevaulegers felt disappointed and frustrated. Some fifty of the younger even deserted. However, in the Battle of Hanau (30/31 October) in another great charge, the chevaulegers, along with other cavalrymen of the Guard opened ways of retreat for the remnants of the Army.

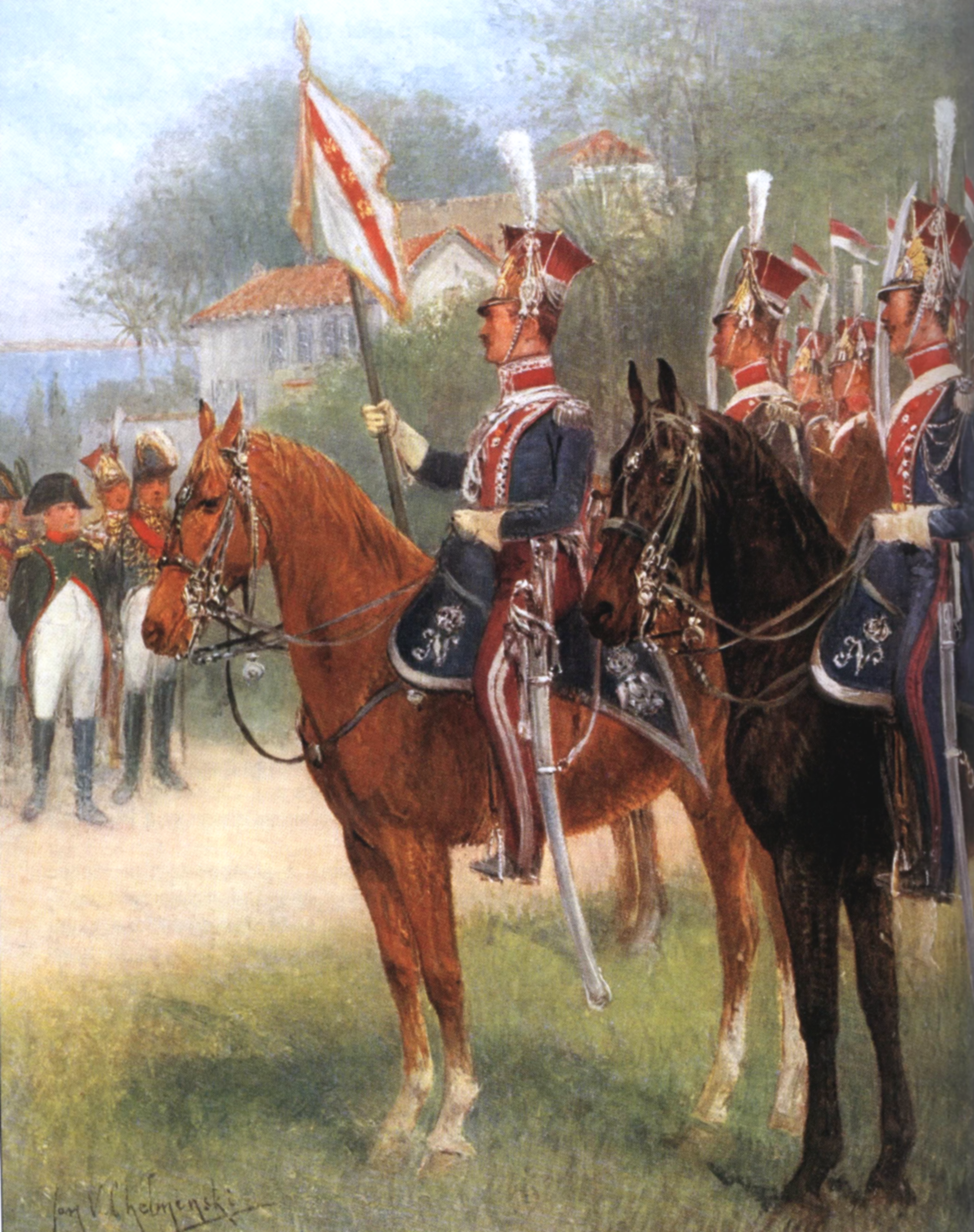
Napoleon inspecting the 'Elba Squadron of Polish Volunteers' while exiled on the Principality of Elba

In 1814, while defending France the chevaulegers and scouts took part in nearly every battle of the period. They fought at Saint Dizier, Brienne, La Rothière, Champaubert, Montmirail, Vauchamps, Montereau, Troyes, Berry-au-Bac, Craonne, Laon, Reims, Fère-Champenoise, Arcis-sur-Aube and Vitry. They took part in the battle of Paris. To the end they remained loyal to Napoleon. After the betrayal of Marshal Marmont who was supposed to cover Fontainebleau, Kozietulski led two Polish regiments to the palace. Here for the last time Napoleon reviewed his Polish detachment of the Guard. After his abdication, the victorious powers excluded chevaulegers from the French Army. The soldiers of the regiment returned to their once again occupied country, and went into the newly created Army of Congress Poland. Their way back to Poland was not pleasant, especially during the crossing of Prussia, but in Poland they were welcomed with love and respect.

One squadron of volunteers under Major Paweł Jerzmanowski accompanied Napoleon to Elba. During the "March on Paris" the squadron marched as a vanguard of Napoleon's forces. During the Hundred Days campaign, 225 men of the Polish detachment fought as part of Red Lancers division under General Colbert, wearing their Polish uniforms (in the decree excluding foreigners from the Guard, Napoleon made the only exception for the Squadron of Elba). Despite a summons by the Grand Duke Konstantin, demanding that Jerzmanowski return with his squadron to Poland, chevaulegers fought at the Battle of Ligny and in the Battle of Waterloo. After the defeat, the squadron retreated along with Marshal Davout – to the left banks of the Loire. On 1 October 1815 all members of the squadron were forced to leave the French Army.

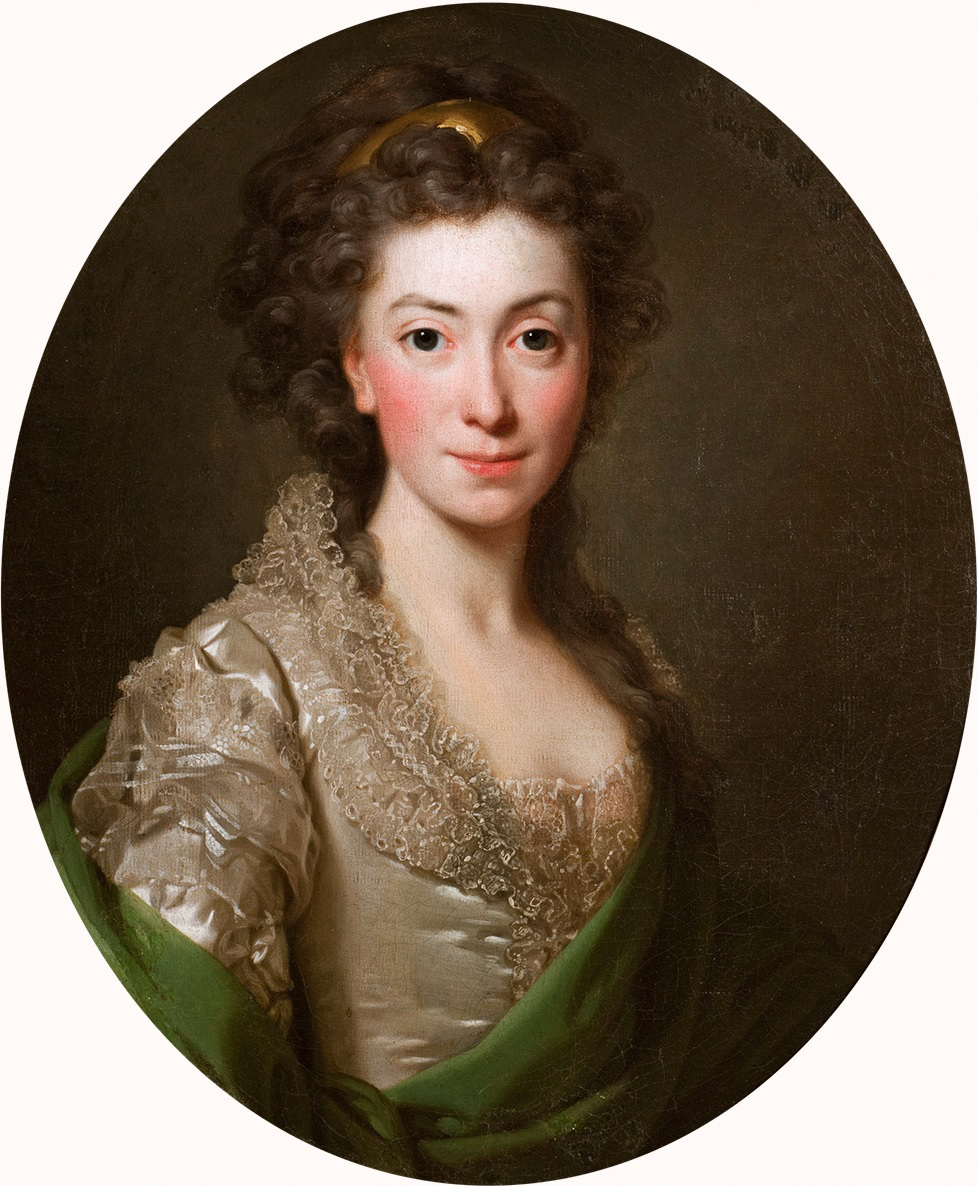
Izabela Czartoryska

The very last accent of the existence of the Regiment was this letter:

To Izabella, née Comtess Fleming, Princess Czartoryska

Your Grace!

The officers of the former Polish 1st Regiment of Chevaux Legers of the Imperial Guard, after so many years of fighting, wishing to pay their respects to Your Grace, whose virtues and love of our Country are widely known, present to you one of the Banners of their Regiment for your Collection of Sacred Relics of Our National Glory, which, assembled by Your Grace, has been rescued from the enemies of our country and saved for future generations. This banner has been present at a hundred battles and has flown over the walls of Madrid, Vienna and the Kremlin. Thousands of Polish youths who followed it have felt happy to shed their blood for their Country and its Eternal Glory.

Your Highness, this gift is evidence of the feelings that we bear for you, together with every other Pole, and proof of our esteem.

In the name of all its officers, Major General, formerly Colonel of the Regiment, Count Krasiński.

== Registre-Matricule ==
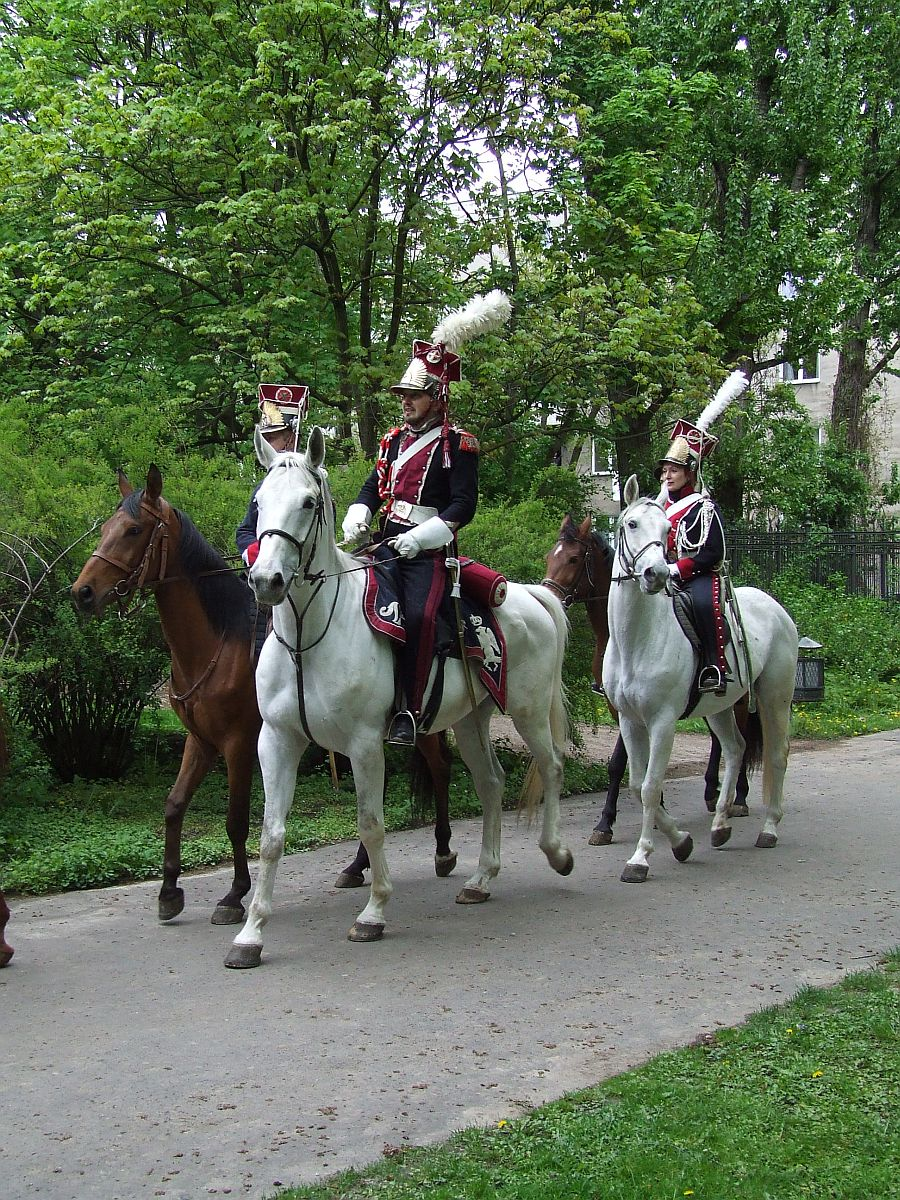
Reenactors preparing to the parade in Warsaw, May 2008

Archival records on the soldiers of the 1st Regiment can be found in genealogical books known as Registre-Matricule.

First book, commenced 14 April 1807 in Warsaw, includes chevaulegers with record numbers from 1 to 1800. Its last entry was 27 February 1812.

The second book, made in the same manner, was started the same day – 27 February 1812. It covers soldiers registered under numbers 1801 – 3508. The last chevaulegers was recorded on 25 February 1814. The book contains not only those men who enlisted in the 1st Regiment, but also soldiers of the 3rd Regiment Lithuanian chevaulegers, and a squadron of Lithuanian Tartars included in the 1st Regiment as well.

The third book refers to the 3rd Scout Regiment. It was opened 1 January, and closed 21 March 1814 and contains numbers from 1 to 934. The last, fourth book, refers to the detachment of chevaulegers reconstituted in 1815 and dissolved a few months later, after the fall of Napoleon. One can find there the names of about 200 Poles from the Squadron of Elba, as well as the latest of the volunteers.

All books contain names of Poles, Dutchmen, Lithuanians, and Frenchmen.

== March ==
During the Bourbon Restoration, after the first abdication of Napoleon, the Chasseurs à Cheval de la Garde Impériale wrote a march in honour of the Polish Lancers with whom they fought for many years. This march is called Les Adieux des Chasseurs à Cheval aux Lanciers polonais ("Farewell of the Chasseurs à Cheval to the Polish Lancers") also known as Les Lanciers polonais ("The Polish Lancers").

=== Lyrics ===
French	English
1er couplet: Dans la froide Scandinavie, Du héros retentit le nom. Soudain la Pologne asservie, Se lève pour Napoléon. Il avait brisé les entraves De ce peuple ami des Français. Et la France au rang de ses braves Compta les lanciers Polonais. Et la France au rang de ses braves Compta les lanciers Polonais. 2ème couplet: Sans regret, quittant leur patrie Pour Napoléon, ces guerriers Vont jusqu'aux champs d'Ibérie Cueillir des moissons de lauriers. Partout où l'honneur les appelle, Ils veulent tenter des hauts faits. Et partout la gloire est fidèle Aux braves lanciers Polonais Et partout la gloire est fidèle Aux braves lanciers Polonais 3ème couplet: Quand la fortune trop volage, Quand la plus noire des trahisons, Ensemble ont trompé le courage De notre grand Napoléon. Il fit, en présentant les armes, De touchants adieux aux Français. Et l'on vit répandre des larmes Aux braves lanciers Polonais. Et l'on vit répandre des larmes Aux braves lanciers Polonais. 4ème couplet: Napoléon, l'âme attendrie, L'eût dit dans un pareil moment : "Retournez dans votre patrie, Allez, je vous rends vos serments." Il ne croyait dans son exil, N'être suivi que de Français. Mais il retrouva dans son île Encore des lanciers Polonais. Mais il retrouva dans son île Encore des lanciers Polonais. 5ème couplet: Vous, qu'a nos nobles journées La gloire a fait participer, Polonais, de vos destinées, Le ciel doit enfin s'occuper. Mais fussiez-vous dans les alarmes, Amis nous n'oublierons jamais Que nous avions pour frères d'armes Les braves lanciers Polonais; Que nous avions pour frères d'armes Les braves lanciers Polonais.	1st verse: In the cold Scandinavia, The Hero's name resounds. Suddenly enslaved Poland, Rises up for Napoleon. He had broken the fetters Of these friends of the French people. And France amongst its braves Counted the Polish lancers. And France amongst its braves Counted the Polish lancers. 2nd verse: Without regret, leaving their homeland For Napoleon, these warriors Go up to the fields of Iberia To harvest crops of laurels. Wherever honour calls them, They want to try great feats. And everywhere glory is faithful To the brave Polish Lancers And everywhere glory is faithful To the brave Polish Lancers 3rd verse: When too fickle fortune, When the blackest of betrayals, Together deceived the courage Of our great Napoleon. He said, while presenting arms, Touching farewell to the French. And we saw tears streaming from the brave Polish Lancers. And we saw tears streaming from the brave Polish Lancers. 4th verse: Napoleon, his soul touched, Said at that moment: "Return to your homeland. Go, I free you from your oaths." He thought, in his exile, To be followed only by Frenchmen. But he found on his island Again, the Polish Lancers But he found on his island Again, the Polish Lancers 5th verse: You, who during our noble days, Had been involved in glory. Poles, of your destiny, Heaven must now take charge. But if you are in danger, Friends, we will never forget That we had for brothers in arms The brave Polish Lancers That we had for brothers in arms The brave Polish Lancers

== Tradition ==
In the times of the Second Polish Republic the traditions of the 1st Regiment were maintained by 1. Pułk Szwoleżerów Józefa Piłsudskiego, an exclusive regiment of cavalry, the 2nd squadron of which was traditionally the Service Squadron for the president of Poland.

Each year, since the mid-1990s, in the middle of August in Ciechanów and Opinogóra the "Return of the Chevaulegers " festival is organized by the city of Ciechanów, Museum of Romanticism in Opinogóra, Faculty of Arts of the Aleksander Giejsztor College, and many other institutions and organizations. During the spectacle many re-enactment groups from countries such as Poland, Great Britain, Belarus, Lithuania and Latvia present themselves in historical uniforms.

== See also ==
- Army of the Duchy of Warsaw
- Polish cavalry
- Polish Legions in Italy
- Vistula Legion
- Uhlan
