= Church of St. Adalbert, Poznań =

Coordinates: 52.4136°N 16.9325°E

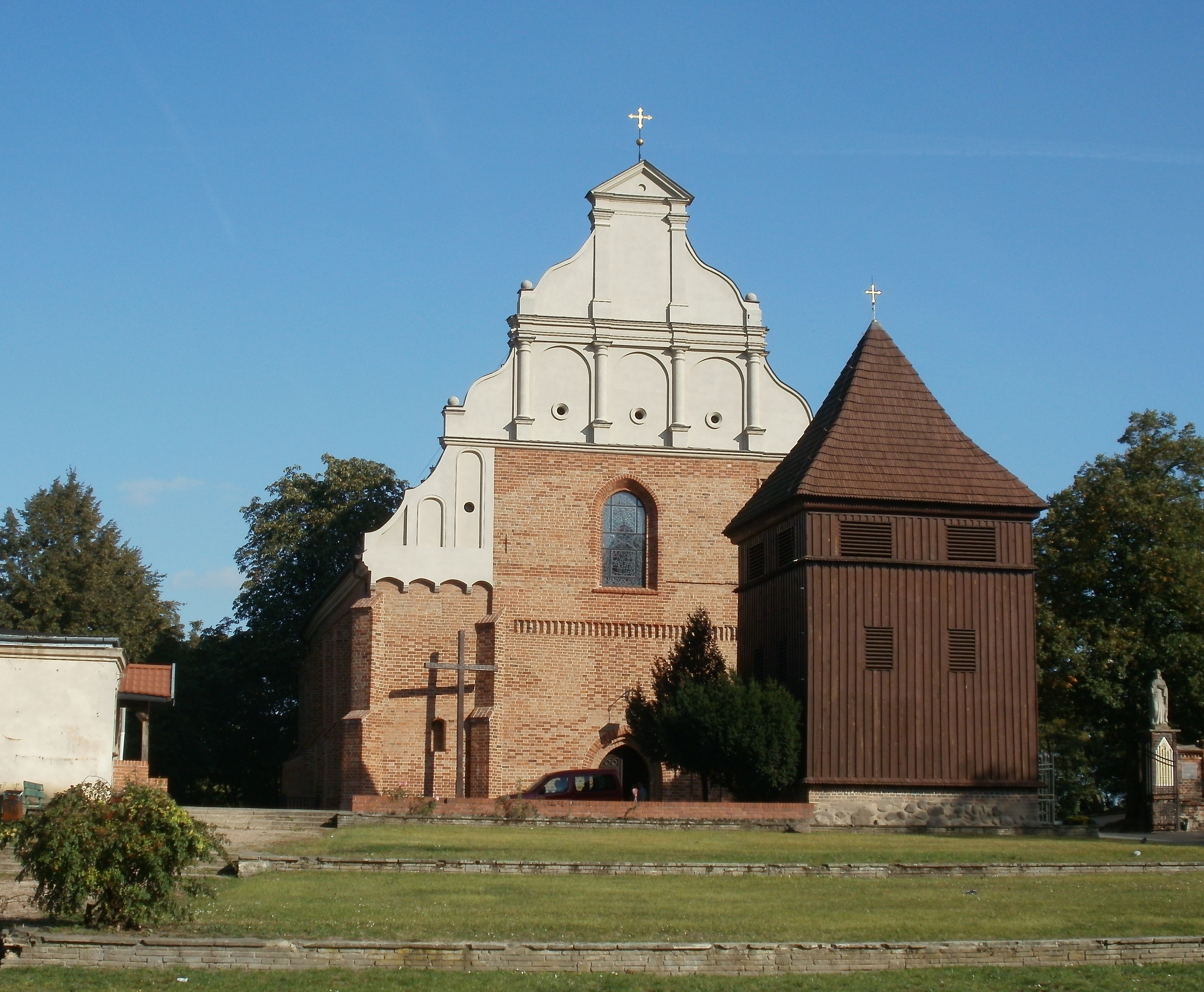
The Church of St. Adalbert in Poznań with its wooden belfry

The Church of St. Adalbert or the Church of St. Wojciech (Polish: Kościół św. Wojciecha) in Poznań, Poland, was constructed in the 15th century. The church has a centuries-old wooden belfry.

== History ==
The oldest known reference of a church or place of worship in this location dates back to 1244 and is connected to the establishment of a parish for the local settlement, which lay outside the city walls. At the beginning of the 15th century, sources mention its dedication to Saints Saint Adalbert of Prague (Wojciech) and George (Jerzy). At that time, the church comprised one nave, to which a northern nave was later added, followed by vaulting of the presbytery. In the 1480s, a tower was erected in the southwest corner, followed by a sacristy on the northern side of the presbytery. In the 16th century, a southern nave was added to the body, and the eastern façade was crowned with a Renaissance gable. At the turn of the 16th and 17th centuries, the presbytery, main nave, and northern nave were raised and re-vaulted. At the beginning of the 17th century, the western façade of the church was crowned with a matching gable, and a Baroque bell tower was built on its southwest side. Throughout the 19th century, the church underwent multiple renovations and restorations, notably in the years 1832–1833 and 1894–1895.

In 1910, restoration work began during which the window openings were made uniform. At that time, stained glass windows depicting Blessed Salomea of Poland and Saint Barbara were installed in the side aisles; they are copies of works by Stanisław Wyspiański (from the Franciscan Church in Kraków) and Józef Mehoffer (from the Fribourg Cathedral in Switzerland). From 1911 to 1913, the interior was decorated with polychrome paintings by Antoni Stanisław Procajłowicz. In 1922, a stained glass window depicting Saint Adalbert (Wojciech) by Henryk Nostitz-Jackowski was placed in the presbytery.

In 1923, on the initiative of the parish priest, a crypt was established in the church’s basement modeled after the Skałka crypt in Kraków; it is a burial place for prominent figures associated with the city of Poznań and the Greater Poland region in general.

During World War II, in early 1945, the eastern gable was damaged, stained glass windows were destroyed, as well as the neo-Gothic main altar from the late 19th century, the side altars, the pulpit, and the sarcophagus of Karol Marcinkowski. That same year, repairs and restoration work began, culminating in the re-consecration of the church. In the early 1950s, the eastern gable was rebuilt, and a new sacristy was constructed.

== Burials ==
- Józef Wybicki
- Andrzej Niegolewski
- Feliks Nowowiejski
- Tadeusz Szeligowski
- Stefan Bolesław Poradowski
- Paweł Edmund Strzelecki
- Jan Henryk Dąbrowski (heart)
- Florian Marciniak
