= Boremel =

Village in western Ukraine

Boremel Ukrainian: Боремель Polish: Boremel Yiddish: Barmli
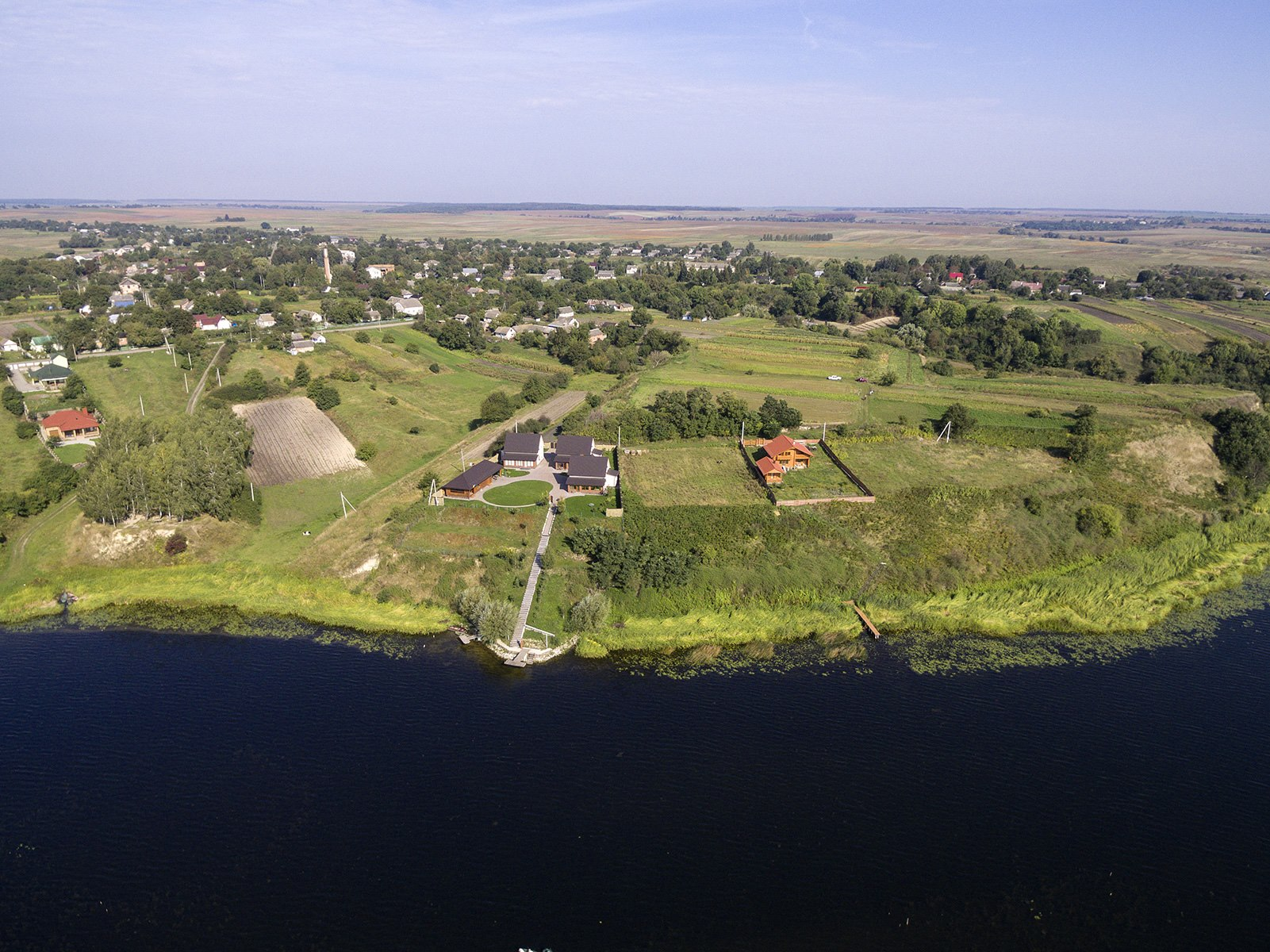
- Interactive map of Boremel
- Coordinates: 50.4761°N 25.1797°E
- Country: Ukraine
- Oblast: Rivne Oblast
- Raion: Dubno Raion
- Hromada: Boremel rural hromada

Population
  - Total: 854

Boremel (Ukrainian: Боремель, Polish: Boremel, Yiddish: Barmli) is a village in the Dubno Raion in Rivne Oblast in western Ukraine, but was formerly administered within Demydivka Raion. The population is 866 inhabitants.

== History ==
First time mentioned in 1366.

Yosef Weitz and Wincenty Krasiński were born here.

During World War II, the local Jewish population was kept imprisoned in a ghetto. In September 1942, an Einsatzgruppen perpetrated a mass execution killing 700 Jews according to Soviet archives.
