= Bytyń, Greater Poland Voivodeship =

Bytyń
- Village
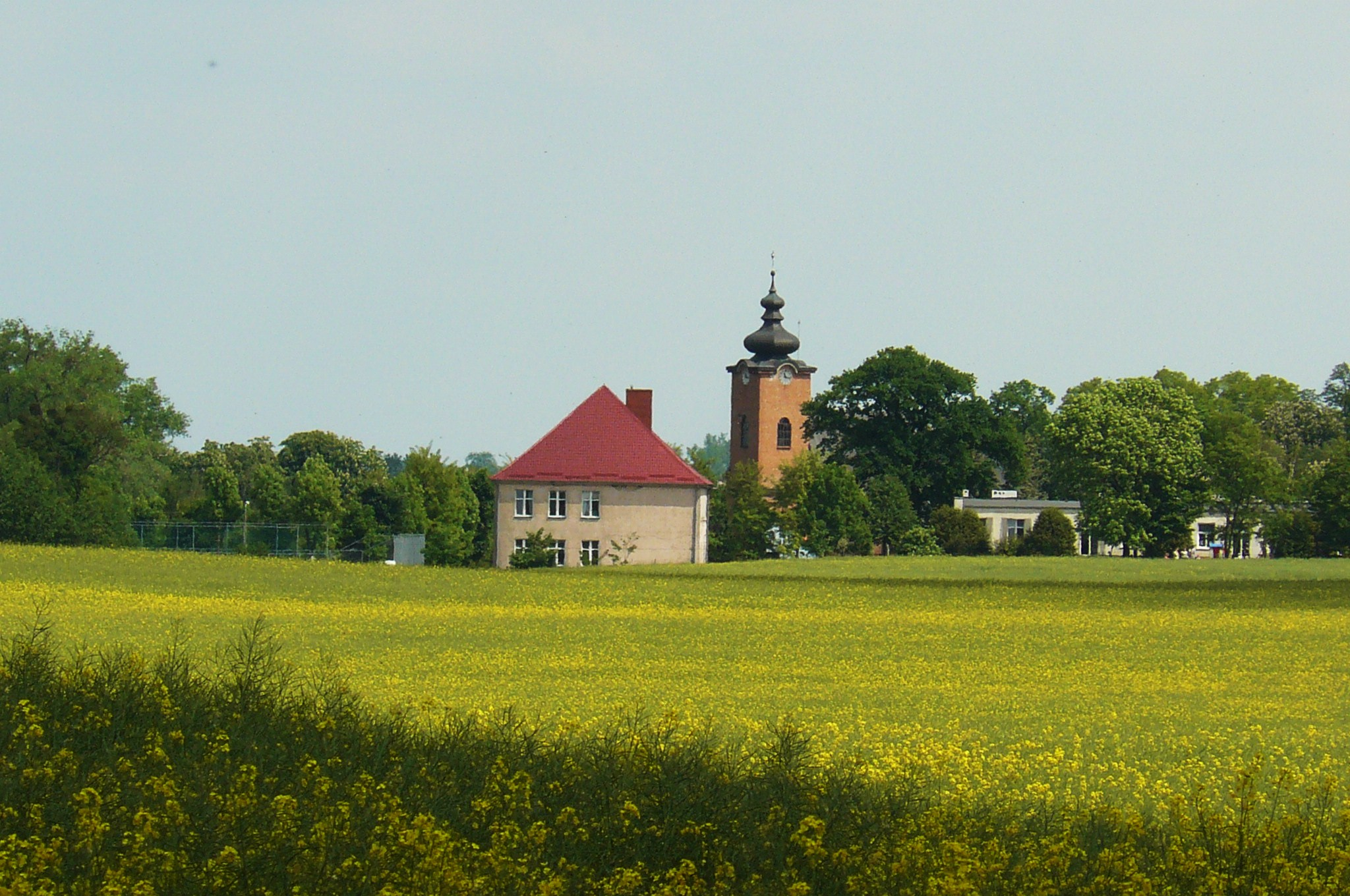
- Panorama of Bytyń with the Immaculate Conception church

- Location within Poland
- Coordinates: 52°29′N 16°31′E
- Country: Poland
- Voivodeship: Greater Poland
- County: Szamotuły
- Gmina: Kaźmierz
- First mentioned: 1322
- Population: 540
- Time zone: UTC+1 (CET)
  - Summer (DST): UTC+2 (CEST)
- Vehicle registration: PSZ
- Primary airport: Poznań–Ławica Airport

Bytyń [ˈbɨtɨɲ] is a village in the administrative district of Gmina Kaźmierz, within Szamotuły County, Greater Poland Voivodeship, in west-central Poland.

The landmarks of the village are the Gothic Immaculate Conception church and the Niegolewski Palace.

== History ==
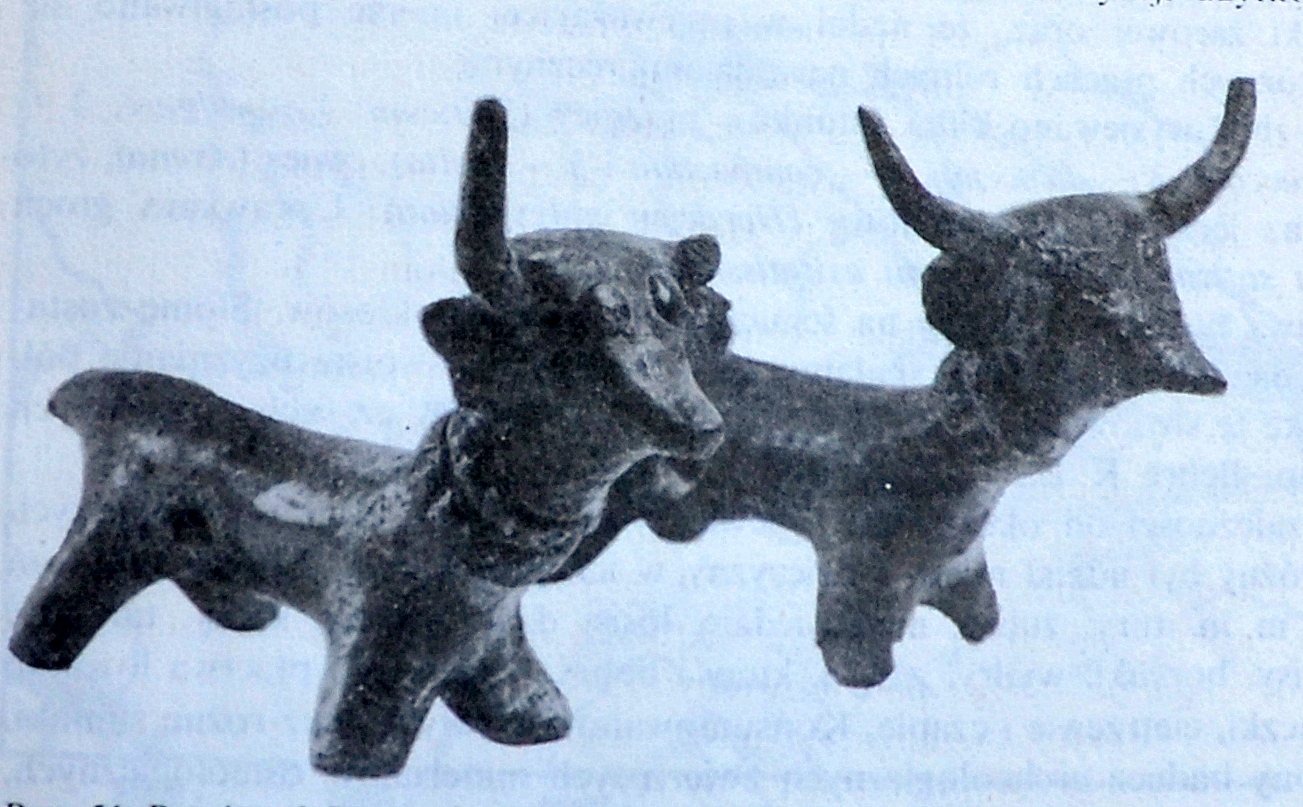
Oxen of Bytyń

The oldest known mention of the village comes from 1322. Bytyń was a private village owned by Polish nobility, including the Konarzewski and Niegolewski families, and was administratively located in the Poznań County in the Poznań Voivodeship in the Greater Poland Province of the Kingdom of Poland.

In 1873 a unique arsenical bronze treasure from the Funnelbeaker culture, dating from the second half of the 4th millennium BC was discovered in the village, including carved figures of oxen known as the Oxen of Bytyń, which are now part of the collection of the Archaeological Museum in Poznań.

During the German occupation of Poland (World War II), in November 1939, the Germans carried out a massacre of 72 Poles from the county in the Bytyń Forest as part of the Intelligenzaktion.

== Notable people ==
- Andrzej Niegolewski (1787-1857), Polish colonel, parliamentarian and activist
