= Benito de San Juan =

Spanish military officer (1727–1809)

Death of General San Juan

Benito de San Juan (1727 – 7 January 1809) was a Spanish military officer and a notable commander of the Spanish forces during the Peninsular War. He was commanding officer of the Spanish forces at the Battle of Somosierra.

== Career ==
Benito de San Juan started his military career as a Lieutenant Colonel of the hussars of Estremadura during the War of the Oranges (1801). Noticed by Manuel Godoy, he was promoted to colonel and in 1802 was named commander of Godoy's personal guard. He was promoted to Brigadier followed by his promotion in 1805 to the rank of Mariscal (field marshal). He then became general inspector of Spanish infantry and line cavalry.

During the Peninsular War, he assumed command over some 12,000 troops, defending the passes of Guadarrama, Fonfría, Navacerrada and Somosierra in the mountain range to the north of Madrid. Knowing the weakness of his forces, much inferior to the French army (considered the best fighting force of its time), he prepared a plan of indirect defence of the Spanish capital by defending the road leading to the Somosierra Pass, some 100 kilometres to the north of the capital. At the resulting battle, he lost most of his artillery and his force was dispersed. San Juan himself was wounded several times during the charge of the Polish cavalry and was forced to escape to Segovia, allowing Napoleon to pass and establish his field headquarters at Buytrago.

San Juan finally managed to withdraw with the remnants of his routed forces to Talavera de la Reina, where he attempted to rally his troops. However, the demoralisation of the Spanish army, composed in a large part of untrained conscripts and peasant volunteers, led to a mutiny. On 7 January 1809, the mutineers (apparently led by a local friar) captured San Juan who attempted to reason with them and to fight them only to be forcefully disarmed, shot him three times as he tried to jump out of a window; after which his corpse was hung from a tree and shot several more times.

== See also ==
1. "Benito San Juan – nieszczęsny generał" [Benito San Juan, the Unfortunate General]. Rzeczpospolita (in Polish). 123 (2006–05–27). Warsaw, Poland: Gremi Media SA. 27 May 2006. OCLC 264077858.
