= Andrzej Niegolewski =

Polish colonel (1787–1857)

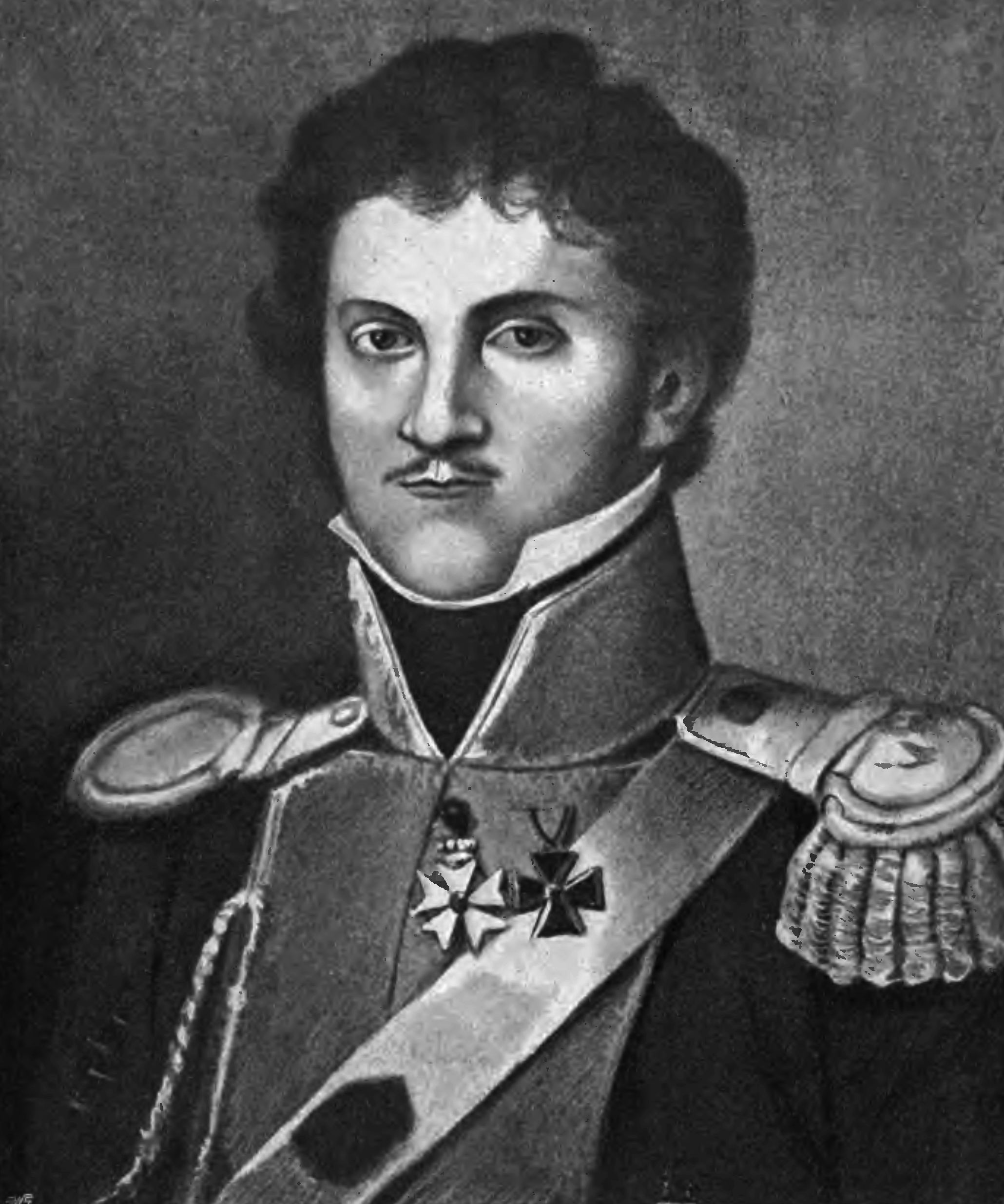
- Born: Andrzej Marcin Niegolewski; November 12, 1787; Bytyń
- Died: February 18, 1857 (aged 69); Poznań
- Burial place: Church of St. Adalbert, Poznań
- Military career
- Allegiance: First French Empire; Congress Kingdom
- Branch: Cavalry
- Service years: 1806-1831
- Rank: Colonel
- Units: 1st Polish Light Cavalry Regiment of the Imperial Guard
- Conflicts: Napoleonic Wars; November Uprising
- Awards: Legion of Honour

Andrzej Marcin Niegolewski (12 November 1787 – 18 February 1857) was a Polish colonel that served in the Polish Light Cavalry Regiment during the Napoleonic Wars, a member of parliament and a shareholder of the Poznan Bazar. During the Spanish Peninsular War, he distinguished himself particularly at the battle of Somosierra.

== Biography ==
Son of Felicjan Niegolewski of Grzymała coat of arms and of Magdalena Niegolewska (born Potocka) of Pilawa coat of arms, he had a brother and a sister. In November 1806, he joined the squadron of Napoleon's Polish honor guards in Poznań.

Sent to the 5th Polish cavalry regiment, he was promoted to second lieutenant and then lieutenant. He fought in Pomerania with the capture of Tczew and the Siege of Gdańsk in 1807. In the summer of 1807, he joined the Polish Light Cavalry Regiment of the Imperial Guard as a second lieutenant.

=== The charge of Somosierra ===
The Polish light cavaleries followed Napoléon in Spain. On the 30th of November 1808 the famous charge of Somosierra took place, which cost three regimental officiers their lives (a fourth one, the captain Dziewanowski, died due to his injuries a few days later). As the approach to Madrid was blocked by 7,800 Spaniards armed with 16 cannons in four batteries on the Somosierra heights, Napoleon ordered his Poles to force the passage.

The charge of the 3rd squadron was led by Squadron Leader Kozietulski, who lost his horse after taking the first battery. Lieutenant Andrzej Niegolewski, who had gone on a reconnaissance mission, joined the charge at that moment with his men. The charge was now led by Captain Dziewanowski. The Poles took the next two batteries but lost their commander who fell seriously wounded, then Captain Pierre Krasiński, who was also wounded.

Lieutenant Niegolewski, the last able-bodied officer, led the end of the charge: with about thirty survivors, he reached the last battery, saw his horse killed under him and, in the fall, broke a leg. Wounded by multiple bayonet blows, Andrzej Niegolewski was overtaken by the Spaniards. The latter counter-attacked and managed to retake the battery. Napoleon then launched a second charge with the three remaining Polish squadrons under Tomasz Łubieński, followed by the Guards' mounted chasseurs.

Still alive, very seriously wounded, Lieutenant Niegolewski was still lying on the ground under his horse when Marshal Bessières approached him and said, "young man, the Emperor has seen the beautiful charge of the Light Cavalry; he will know how to appreciate your bravery." Niegolewski then replied: "My lord, I am dying; here are the cannons that I took away, tell that to the Emperor". When he arrived on the plateau, the Emperor immediately awarded him the Cross of the Legion of Honor, taking it off his own uniform, and making him the first officer of his regiment to receive it.

The number of wounds received by the young lieutenant varies according to the authors. He received 10 to 11 wounds, including eight to nine bayonet wounds and one to two head wounds (one saber strike and probably a bullet).

He participated in the Austrian campaign of 1809 and fought again in Spain in 1810-1811. During the Russian campaign in 1812, he served on the main staff as a captain. At the end of 1813, he was granted sick leave and spent some time in Paris.

=== Rising of 1830 ===
In December 1814, he returned to Poland and lived in Niegolewo. He married Anna Krzyżanowska (1816) and came to live on his wife's estate in Włościejewka, near Śrem. From then on, he was involved in the agricultural production of his properties.

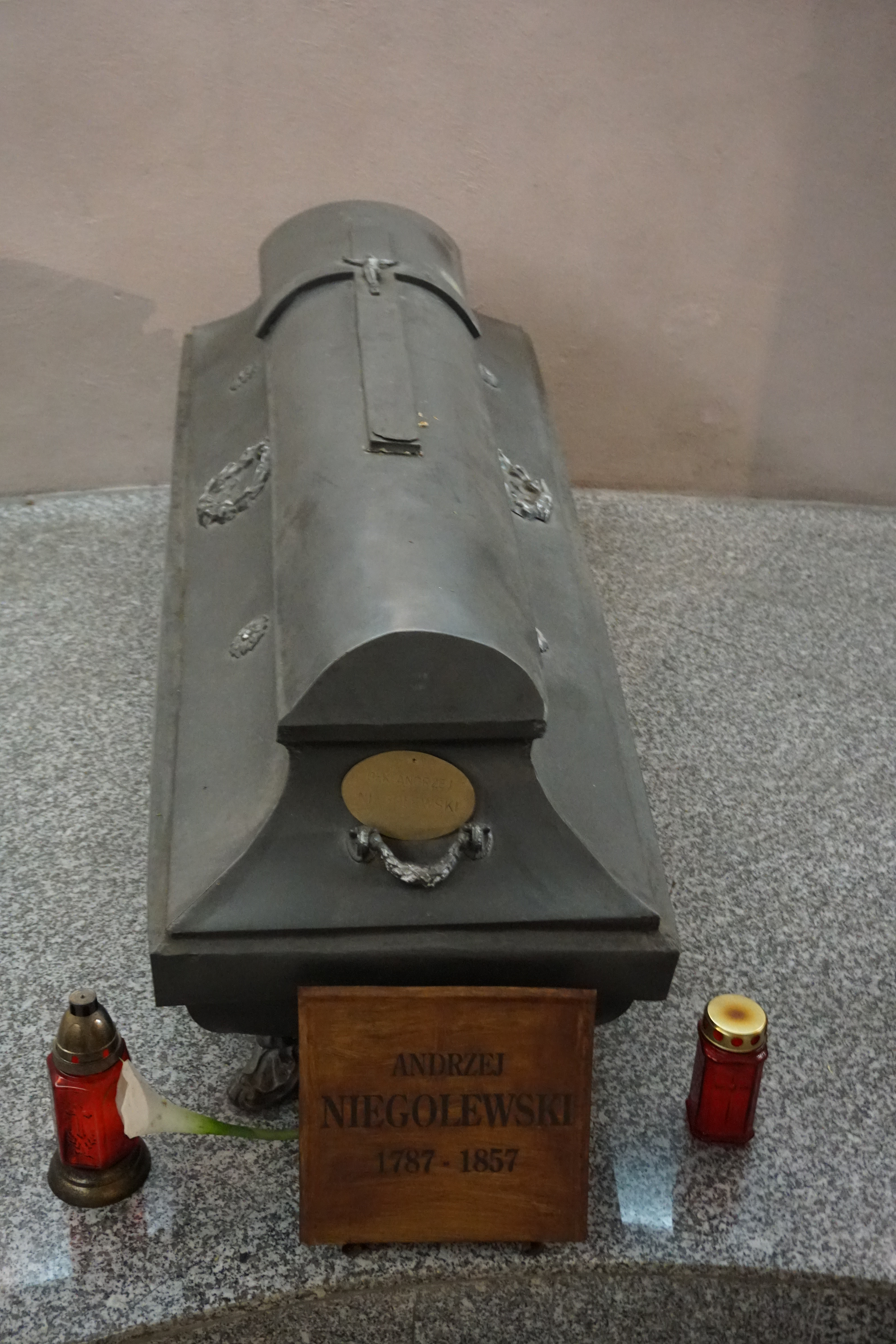
Niegolewski's grave in the Church of St. Adalbert, Poznań

In November 1830 the Polish November Uprising against Russia occurred. Niegolewski went to Warsaw and was assigned to the general staff. Promoted to colonel, he commanded the Sandomierz cavalry regiment (March–June 1831). From June 1831, he served in the main staff and in August 1831, he received the gold cross of Virtuti Militari. In September, he was discharged from active service for health reasons and returned to the Greater Poland region.

With the failure of the uprising, he suffered repression and was sentenced to nine months in prison and confiscation of his property. He served his sentence (finally reduced by half) in the fortress of Cosel.

=== Politician and financier ===
In the following years, he was one of the most active activists in Greater Poland, defending the Polish language in the public life of the Grand Duchy of Poznań in the provincial parliament, where he was an elected member. He was a deputy of the chivalry of the Buk and Oborniki powiats (counties) in the provincial parliament of the Grand Duchy in 1827 and 1830 before the uprising. He was elected again in 1841 and 1843.

He became an advisor to the banking institution Crédit foncier de Poznań. He was also a shareholder in the Bazaar company in Poznań. After his death, he was buried in the family grave in the Buk cemetery. On Sunday, October 14, 1923 in Poznań, the remains of Colonel Niegolewski and Generals Antoni Kosiński and Józef Wybicki were solemnly laid to rest in the Crypt of Merit in the Church of St. Adalbert in Poznań.

Eight of his children, five daughters and three sons, have reached adulthood. One of them was Władysław Maurycy (1819-1885), a lawyer and social and political activist from Greater Poland.
