= Ferdynand Stokowski =

Polish officer

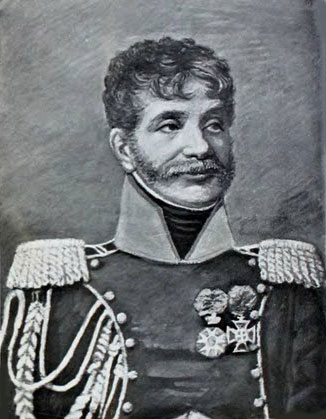
Ferdynand Stokowski

Ferdynand Ignacy Stokowski (26 August 1776, in Sierpowie – 1827) was a Polish officer in the French army of the Napoleonic Wars. He was one of the squadron commanders of the Polish 1st Light Cavalry Regiment of the Imperial Guard and made a baron de l'Empire in 1811, before being dismissed from the French army with the rank of brigadier general.
