= Battle of Somosierra =

1808 battle of the Peninsular War

- Part of the Peninsular War
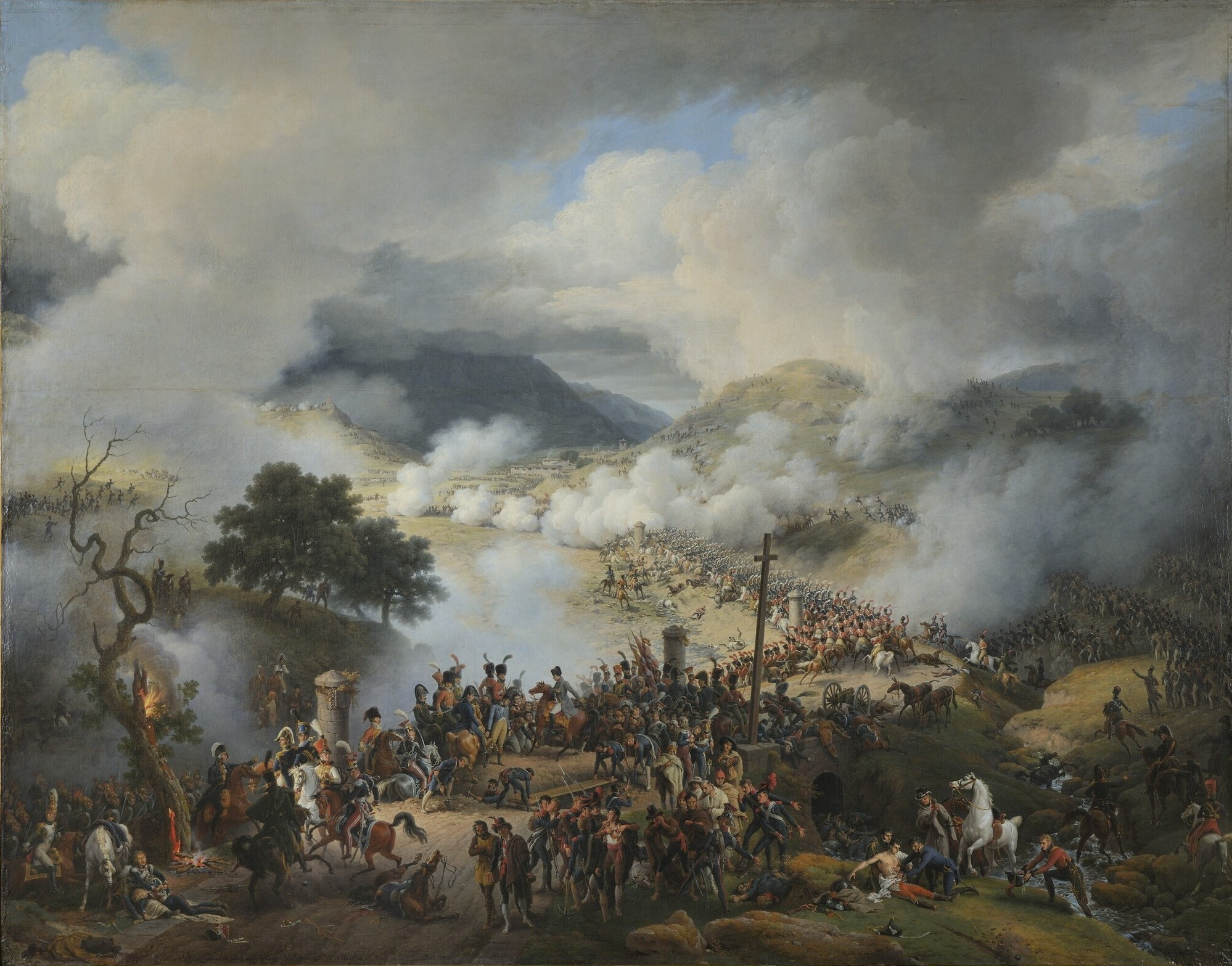
- The Battle of Somo-Sierra; Louis-François Lejeune, 1810
Date	30 November 1808
Location	Somosierra Pass, Province of Segovia, Spain 41°09′N 3°35′W
Result	Franco-Polish victory

Belligerents
France; Spain; Duchy of Warsaw	Spain

Commanders and leaders
(First French Empire) Napoleon I (Spain under Joseph Bonaparte) Joseph I (Duchy of Warsaw) Jan Leon Kozietulski	Benito de San Juan

Strength
8,000	12,000

Casualties and losses
300	2,200

Peninsular War: Napoleon's invasion
current battle

The Battle of Somosierra took place on 30 November 1808, during the Peninsular War, when a combined Franco-Napoleonic Spanish-Polish force under the direct command of Napoleon I forced a passage through a Spanish division stationed at the Sierra de Guadarrama, which shielded Madrid from direct French attack. At the Somosierra mountain pass, 60 miles (97 km) north of Madrid, a heavily outnumbered Spanish detachment of regulars, volunteers and artillery under Benito de San Juan attempted to block Napoleon's advance onto Madrid. Napoleon overwhelmed the Spanish positions in a combined arms attack, sending the Polish Chevau-légers of the Imperial Guard at the Spanish guns while French infantry advanced up the slopes. The victory removed the last obstacle barring the road to Madrid, which fell a few days later.

== Background ==
French invasion of Spain had started with the Battle of Zornoza. By late November 1808 the French Grande Armée had overwhelmed and destroyed both wings of the Spanish popular army. To complete his reconquest of Spain, Napoleon advanced into Madrid with 40,000 men. General Benito de San Juan mustered an ad hoc army of militia, reservists and various regular regiments still reeling from earlier defeats – in all about 12,000 men – to defend Madrid. In order to screen the many approaches to the city, San Juan dispersed his greatly outnumbered forces and 9,000 men were sent west to guard the Guadarrama Pass while 3,000 occupied an advanced post at Sepúlveda, leaving only 9,000 men and 16 guns on the heights of Somosierra. The nature of the terrain and the tenacity of the Spaniards initially worked in their favor.

On the evening of 28 November the brigade at Sepúlveda, made up of the 3rd Battalion of the Walloon Guards, the Jaén and Irlanda Regiments and the 1st Battalion of the Seville Volunteers, repulsed a French attack by the two Fusilier Regiments of the Middle Guard, commanded by General Anne Jean Marie René Savary. The Spanish troops were forced to withdraw in the gathering darkness when their cavalry was defeated by the cavalry brigade of General Antoine Charles Louis de Lasalle. On the morning of 30 November, Napoleon advanced his infantry directly toward the pass while small detachments crept up the flanks. Exchanging musket volleys with the defenders, the French made slow but measurable progress toward the enemy guns.

== Battle ==
Because the Spanish forces could not easily be outflanked by infantry movement, and Napoleon was impatient to proceed, he ordered his Polish Chevaux-Légers escort squadron of 125 men (Note: Unit registers showed that the squadron numbered 125.) to charge the Spaniards and their artillery batteries. The charge of 125 against the batteries was joined by Niegolewski's platoon returning from reconnaissance. It is not clear, however, whether the number included only front-line troops (sabres) or all the soldiers in the units, as Napoleon issued no written orders. Jan Kozietulski, who commanded the 3rd Squadron that day, mentioned that he called, "Lekka jazda kłusem!" ("Light cavalry at the trot!") and, passing the little bridge, added, "En avant, Vive l'Empereur!" (Forward, long live the Emperor!").

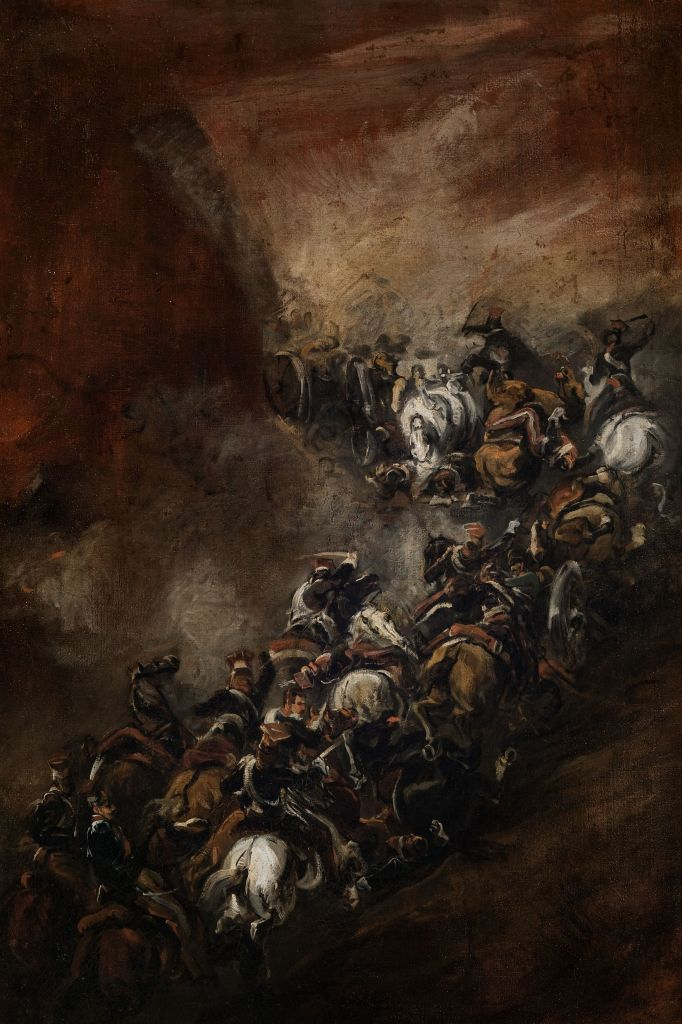
Battle of Somosierra, by Piotr Michałowski, c. 1837. Oil on canvas, 106 cm x 71 cm, National Museum in Kraków

Some authors have assumed that Napoleon had gone out of his mind in ordering the Polish to charge batteries of 16 cannon over several kilometers of extremely difficult terrain. Others, however, think Napoleon ordered only the closest battery to be taken, in order to open the way for his infantry, and that Kozietulski had misunderstood the order. No matter – once the charge had begun, and the chevaux-légers found themselves under fire from the second battery, they had no choice but to press the attack, as the horses went to the highest speed and were unable to stop. They took the second and third batteries but only a few of them reached the last battery, and the Spanish attempted to recapture it. It was then that Napoleon saw his chance and immediately committed the other squadrons.

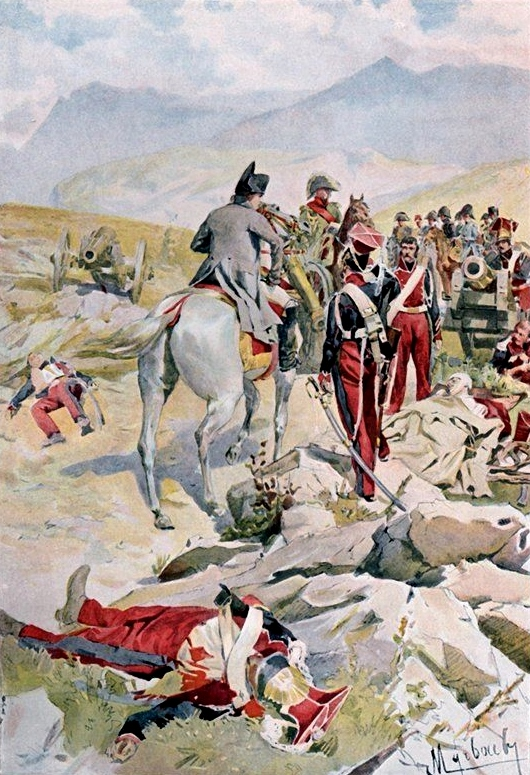
Myrbach painting shows Napoleon conferring with some of the Polish survivors of the charge

Benito de San Juan had 16 cannons at his disposal, arranged in four batteries. Some accounts, based mostly on recollections of French officers, assume that the Spaniards placed all their guns at the peak of Somosierra Pass. However, with a range of 600–800 metres, the cannons, deployed in this fashion, could not have struck much of the French Imperial Army—and there were reports that Napoleon himself was at times under artillery fire. The first battery defended the entrance to the Somosierra pass, the next two covered the pass at its angles and the fourth, only, stood by the heights.

The 13th Bulletin of the Army of Spain mentioned that chevau-légers were commanded by General Louis Pierre, Count Montbrun. However, both Polish charge participants mentioned above and Lieutenant Colonel Pierre Dautancourt, one of the French tutors of the unit, stressed in their accounts that such was not the case. Datancourt mentioned that Montbrun in conversations with him had laughed at that idea. Yet French historian Adolphe Thiers gave him the honor of leading the charge, which caused a protest by surviving Polish participants of the battle. Major Philippe de Ségur in his memoirs wrote that he had commanded the charge, but his accounts were often described as unreliable and, again, both Dautancourt and the Polish sources denied his role in it.

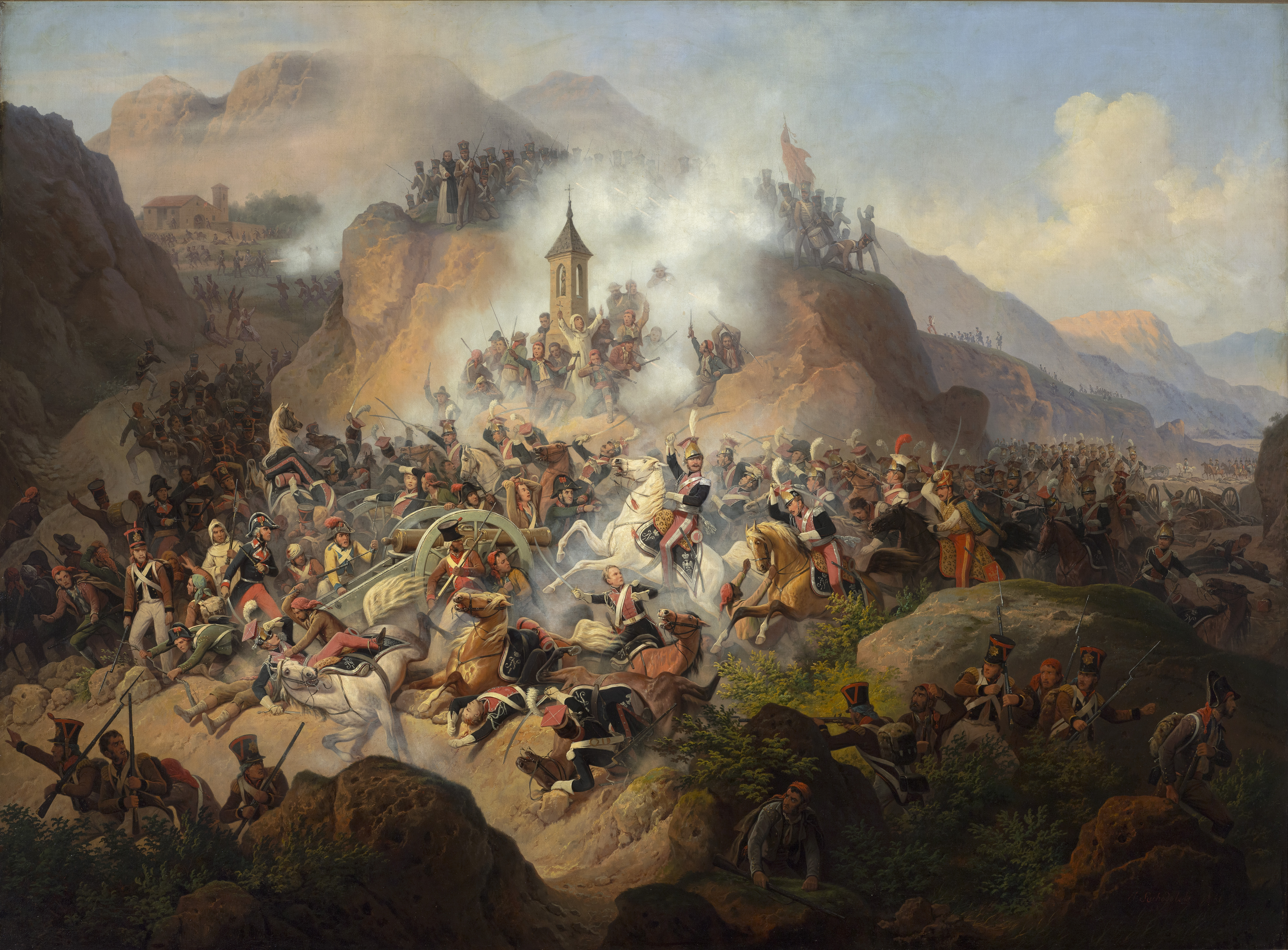
Somosierra, by January Suchodolski, 1860

The charge was led by Kozietulski, but he lost his horse after taking the first battery. The squadron was then joined by Lieutenant Andrzej Niegolewski, who had previously been on reconnaissance with his soldiers. The charge was continued under Dziewanowski, and when he fell from his horse after taking the third battery he was replaced by Piotr Krasiński. The charge that continued to the last battery was led by Niegolewski, who miraculously survived a fierce attack by Spanish troops – he received nine wounds from bayonets and two carbine shots to the head.

According to many memoirs of veterans of the battle, Kozietulski led his men in a charge with the official cry Vive l'Empereur. However, popular legend has it that the true battle cry was the Polish Naprzód psiekrwie, Cesarz patrzy – Forward dammit, the Emperor is watching. Cf. word of Cambronne

When the fourth battery was taken, Napoleon ordered his Chasseurs of the Guard and the 1st squadron of Poles, led by Tomasz Łubieński, to resume the attack and drive the Spaniards from the Pass. Łubieński tried to give himself the whole glory, minimizing the role of the third squadron (while Niegolewski tried to show that he had taken the cannons and Łubieński had therefore had it easy, as the Spanish were shooting at him "with candies").

== Charge effects ==
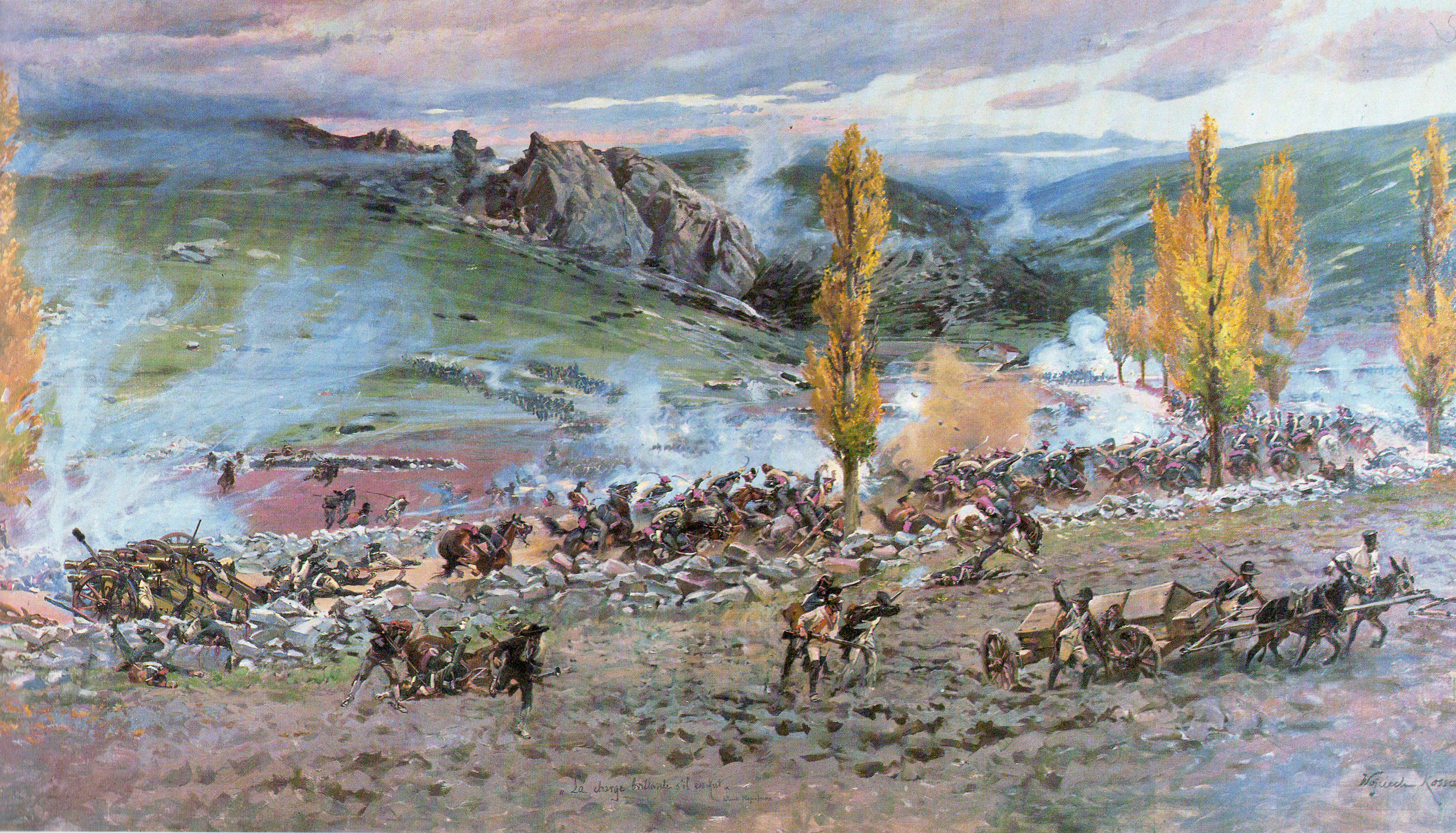
The Charge, part of an unfinished panorama of the battle by Wojciech Kossak and Michał Wywiórski

The 13th Bulletin of the Army of Spain mentioned the lead role of the Polish chevaux-légers. Only a cavalry charge would have been able to take all four batteries, even if French infantry had been close enough to press their attack, and cause the en-masse retreat of Spanish Andalusian irregular militia and, in effect, the retreat of the whole army. Spanish artillerymen preferred to die rather than abandon their position – but no Polish account mentioned any fight with Spanish militia. Militiamen just left their position after seeing how seemingly easily the Poles took the artillery positions – however, in the smoke they could not see just how few Poles were on the top.

== Aftermath ==
Napoleon's invasion of Spain ended successfully with the French occupation of Madrid.

Moore was killed at the end of the Corunna campaign, that commenced with the Battle of Cardedeu.

The next battle Napoleon commanded personally was the Battle of Teugen-Hausen on 19 April 1809.

=== Madrid ===
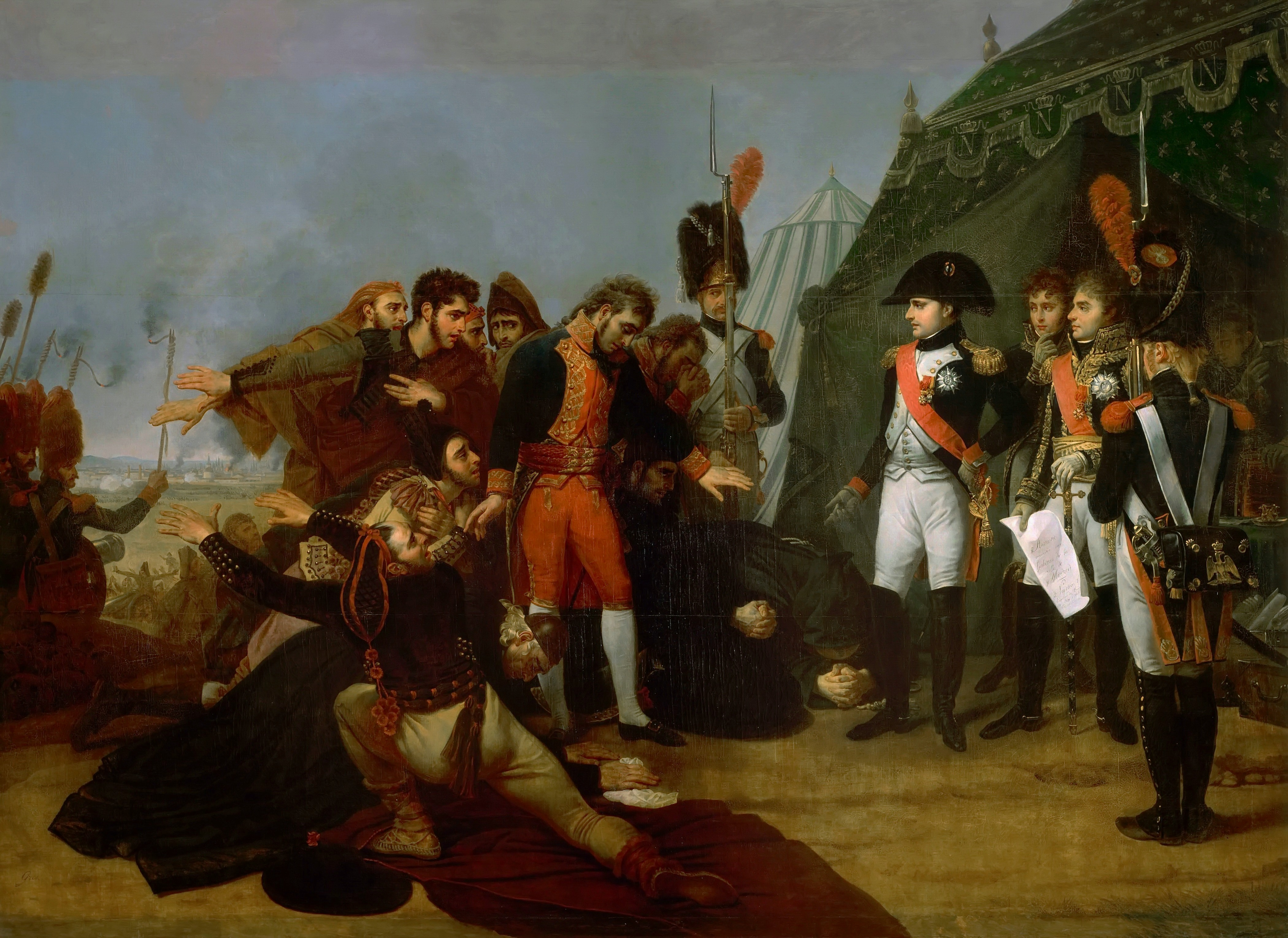
Napoleon Accepting the Surrender of Madrid, by Antoine-Jean Gros, 1810, oil on canvas. Madrid fell in the aftermath of Somosierra.

San Juan raced his army back to Madrid. Although the victory at Somosierra was more accurately the result of a combined infantry and cavalry attack, with the infantry bearing the heavier fighting, later accounts – Napoleon's included – placed all the emphasis on the Polish charge. San Juan was later killed by his own men. French patrols reached the outskirts of Madrid on 1 December. The Junta made a half-hearted and futile attempt to defend the capital, and on 4 December a devastating French artillery barrage brought the Spanish defence to grief, with its remaining 2,500 regulars surrendering; the 20,000 civilians under their banner dispersed; and the French entered Madrid for the second time that year.

== In popular culture ==
The Battle of Somosierra is commemorated on the Tomb of the Unknown Soldier, Warsaw, with the inscription "SOMOSIERRA 30 XI 1808".

== See also ==
- Timeline of the Peninsular War

== Bibliography ==
- Bielecki, Robert (1989). Somosierra 1808. Warszawa: Wydawnictwa Ministerstwa Obrony Narodowej. ISBN 83-11-07620-0.
- Bodart, Gaston (1908). Militär-historisches Kriegs-Lexikon (1618–1905).
- Esdaile, Charles J. (2003). The Peninsular War. Palgrave MacMillan. ISBN 9781403962317.
- Gómez de Arteche y Moro, José (1878). Guerra de Independencia Historia Militar Vol III.
- Nieuważny, Andrzej (2006). "Najpiękniejsza z szarż (The Most Beautiful of Cavalry charges)". Rzeczpospolita (in Polish). 123 (2006–05–27).
- Regan, Geoffrey (2000). Great military blunders. 4 Books. ISBN 978-0-7522-1844-1.
- Somosierra (2021). "Batalla de Somosierra – Entre 1809-1810". sites.google.com. Archived from the original on 14 March 2022.

Preceded by Battle of Tudela	Napoleonic Wars; Battle of Somosierra	Succeeded by Second siege of Zaragoza
