= Wincenty Krasiński =

Polish nobleman and military leader (1782–1858)

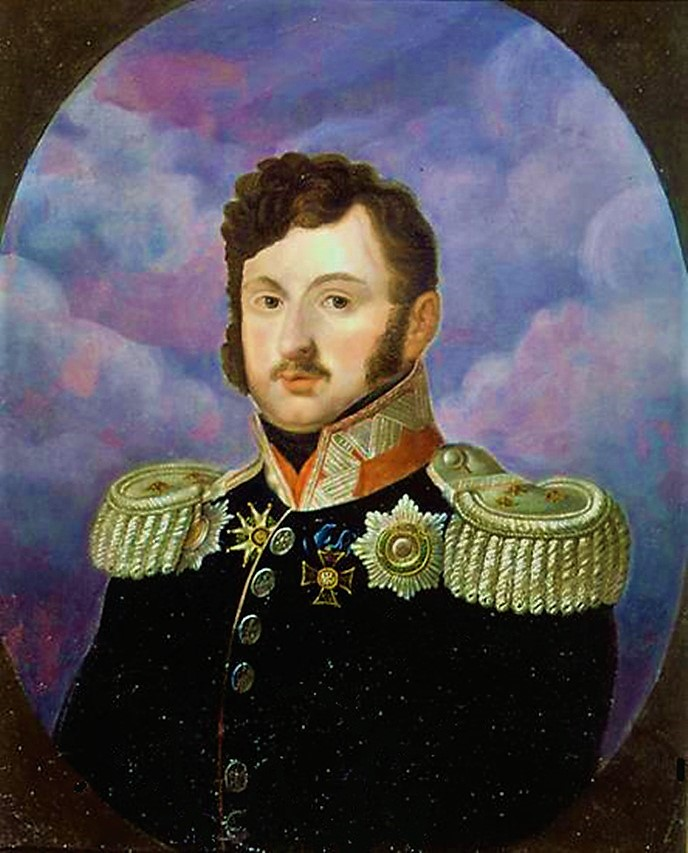
- Born: 5 April 1782; Boremel, Russian Empire
- Died: 24 November 1858 (aged 76); Warsaw, Congress Poland, Russian Empire
- Noble family: Krasiński
- Spouse: Maria Urszula Radziwiłł
- Issue: Zygmunt Krasiński
- Father: Jan Krasiński
- Mother: Antonina Czacka

Count Wincenty Krasiński (5 April 1782 – 24 November 1858) was a Polish nobleman (szlachcic), political activist and military leader.

He was the father of Zygmunt Krasiński, one of Poland's Three Bards—Poland's greatest romantic poets.

== Life ==
His military career began at the age of eight in 1791 in the National cavalry. He advanced in rank to Chorąży and Lieutenant in 1793, being only ten at the time. Although this was more a military school service than a real combat experience, he later became a brave and capable commander. After the partitions of Poland, he became an enthusiastic supporter of Napoleon Bonaparte. As the French Army entered occupied Prussian Poland, Wincenty Krasiński created a cavalry squadron at his own expense.

He participated in Napoleon's Campaigns from 1807 to 1814. He became the commander of the 1st Polish Light Cavalry Regiment of the Imperial Guard. In 1811 he was promoted to Brigadier-General and in 1813 to Major-General (Polish gen. dywizji). From 1814 he commanded the Polish Corps. In France he is known as Vincent de Corvin-Krasinski.

Wincenty Krasiński participated in numerous battles. He fought at Wagram in 1809, the Russian Campaign from 1812 to 1813 and the Campaign of 1814. He was awarded the Virtuti Militari in 1810 and the Légion d'honneur order in 1811.

After the abdication of Napoleon, Wincenty Krasiński became commander of a Guard Division (dywizja gwardyjska) in Russian-dominated Congress Poland in 1815. From 1818 he served as General-Adjutant of the Czar and Sejm Marshal. He became senator-voivode and was awarded the Order of the White Eagle in 1821.

In 1828 as member of the Sejm Court, during the trial against the activists of the Polish Patriotic Society (among others Stanisław Sołtyk), he was the only senator who voted for death penalty. For this he was condemned by public opinion and independence circles alike.

He refused to join the November Uprising in 1830 and was from 1831 General-Adjutant of the Russian Czar Nicolas I. From 1833 Wincenty Krasiński he served as member of the Russian Council of the State.

In 1844 he founded the Krasinski Ordynacja Library in Warsaw. From 1855 to 1856 he served as governor of Polish Congress Poland. Wincenty Krasiński became the 1st Ordynat (1844), and starost of Opinogóra estates.

Wincenty Krasiński married Princess Maria Urszula Radziwiłł on 12 September 1803 in Lwów. He died on 24 November 1858 in Warsaw.

== Decorations ==
- Virtuti Militari, highest decoration for bravery on the battlefield, awarded in 1810.
- Légion d'honneur, awarded in 1811.
- Order of St. Anna, 1st class with diamonds (16 November 1815)
- Knight of the Order of the White Eagle, highest Polish decoration, awarded in 1821.
- Order of Saint Stanislaus
- Order of St. Vladimir, 2nd class (11 October 1820) and 1st class (18 January 1832)
- Order of St. Alexander Nevsky (9 June 1825, diamonds added on 13 October 1831)
- Order of St. Andrew (24 August 1840, diamonds added on 17 November 1855)

== See also ==
- List of Poles
