= The Great Day of Girona =

Painting by Ramon Martí Alsina

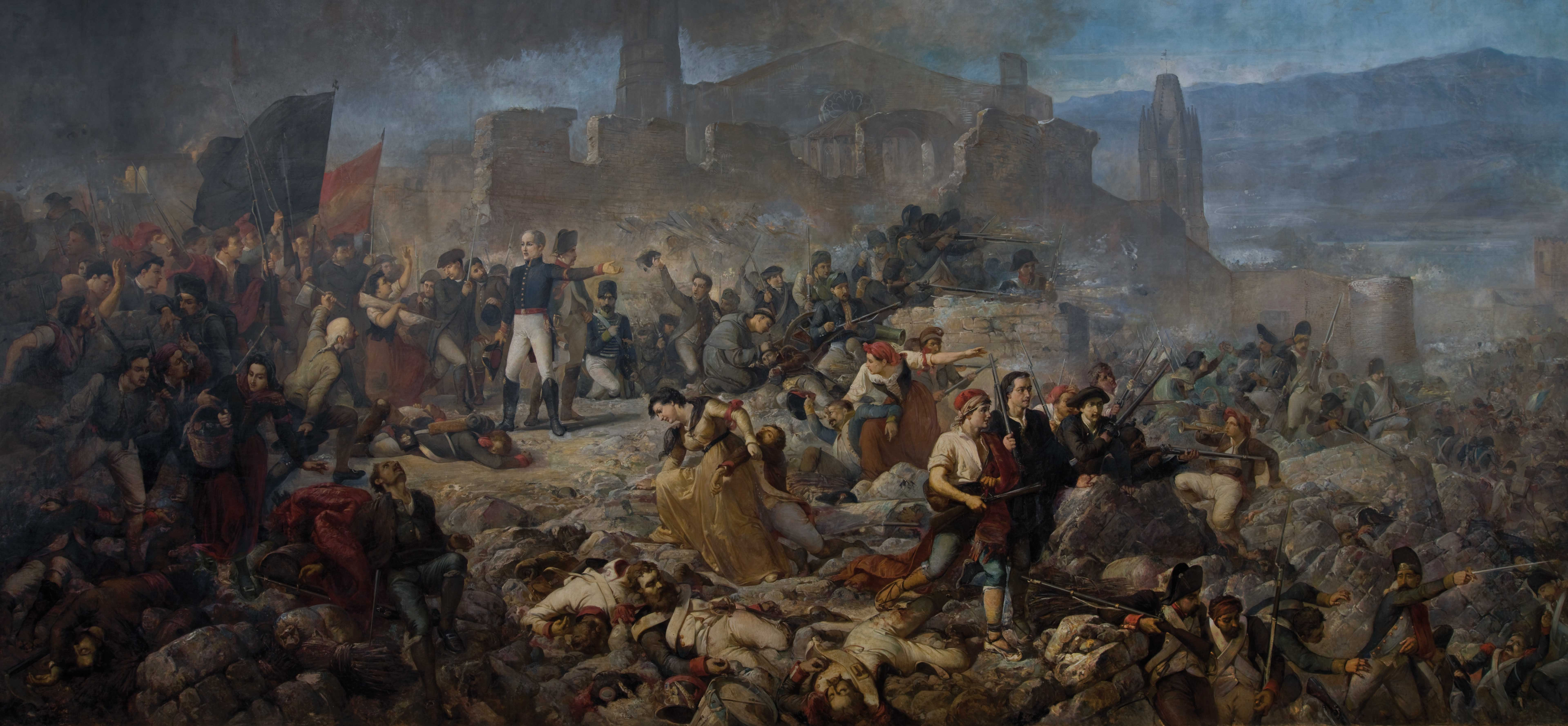
- Artist: Ramon Martí Alsina
- Year: Date completed: 1863-64
- Medium: Oil on canvas
- Dimensions: 496 cm × 1082 cm (16 ft 3 in × 35 ft 6 in)
- Location: Museu d'Art de Girona, Girona

The Great Day of Girona, originally El gran dia de Girona (Catalan pronunciation: [əl ˈɣɾan ˈdi.ə ðə ʒiˈɾonə]), is a large oil painting (4.96 × 10.82 m) by Ramon Martí Alsina depicting an important victory of Girona's defenders over the French during the Third Siege of Girona in 1809. Completed in 1864, it is the largest easel painting in the history of Catalan art. The creation process took more than 10 years and led the artist nearly to financially ruin on several occasions. The painting became part of the collection of the Museu Nacional d'Art de Catalunya, and it is on permanent display in the Girona in an auditorium of the Catalan Government building.

Due to the large size of the work, scholars suggest that it may have been an effort to compete with Marià Fortuny's Battle of Tetuan, a work commissioned by the council of Barcelona regarding the African War.

In 1938 during the Spanish Civil War, the painting was damaged during a bombardment while on exhibit at the Palau de les Belles Arts (Palace of the Fine Arts). To protect it from further damage, the work was rolled up and stored in the Museu Nacional d'Art de Catalunya (MNAC). Seventy years after its deposit, the painting was restored between 2009 and 2010.

== History ==
During the middle of the 19th century, history painting was highly regarded for its depictions of local heroes and patriotic events. Martí Alsina wanted to improve his reputation as a painter on a national level, despite the fact that he was already a lecturer at the Escola de la Llotja in Barcelona. One of the most direct ways of earning a professional reputation at the time was to win a competition such as the National Exhibition of Fine Arts (Exposició Nacional de Belles Arts), which was celebrated annually in Madrid. These competitions combined works of historical subject matter with epic and romantic content. In 1667, André Felibien, historian and theoretician of French Classicism, created a hierarchy of pictorial themes and ranked historical paintings in first place.

Martí Alsina first participated in the competition in 1858, when he was awarded a third-class medal for one of his submissions entitled Estudi del Natural (Study of Nature). Later the same year, he presented a work entitled "L’últim dia de Numància" ("The Last Days of Numantia") outside of the competition, which was later purchased by the state for 3,000 pesetas and given to the Prado Museum. In 1860, he submitted a landscape to the Exposició Nacional de Belles Arts and was awarded a second-class medal.

Martí Alsina spent most of his life obsessed with themes such as the Guerra del Frànces (Peninsular War) and the Siege of Girona, creating such works as El somatent del Bruch, La Companyia de Santa Bàrbara (The Company of Saint Barbara), Les heroïnes de Girona (The Heroines of Girona) and, his best, the Él gran dia De Girona (The Great Day of Girona). The Great Day of Girona took the painter most of his life and until his death to complete.

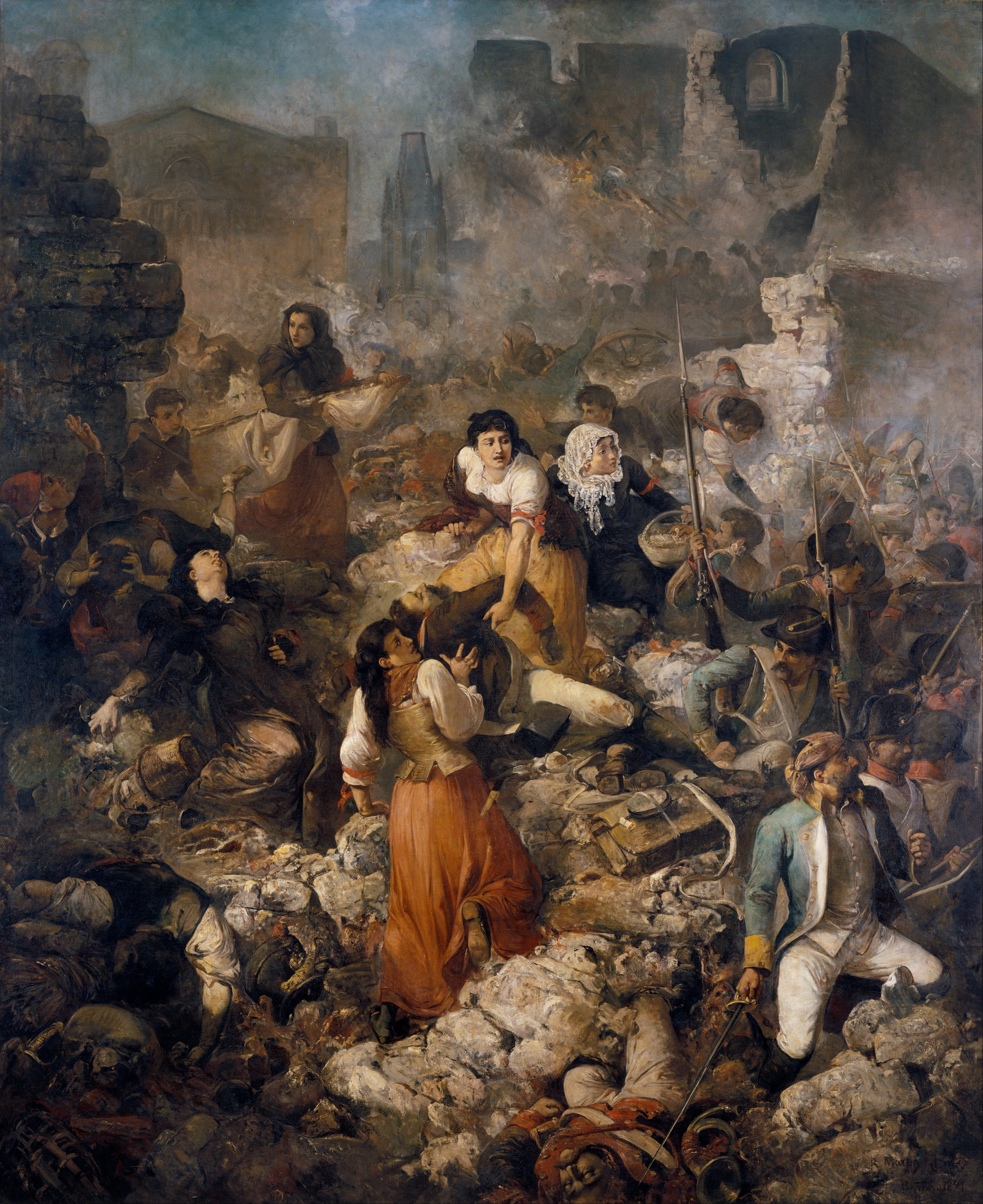
Ramon Martí i Alsina - The Company of Saint Barbara, 1891- MNAC

=== Production Process ===
Several studies claimed that Martí Alsina possibly decided on a work of great dimensions in order to rival The Battle of Tetuan by Marià Fortuny, a work which was commissioned by the council of Barcelona and which achieved considerable success on a European level. Martí Alsina located a large studio space, called the "Casino de Sants," to accommodate his project. The premises are believed to have been situated in building number 300 of the high street in the neighbourhood of Sants, an address consistent with the documentation of the work in 1882. The artist brought various types of armour, weapons and historical objects to the studio to achieve the highest degree of standard in his work. He also utilized dozens of models whom he dressed in costumes specifically made for the occasion. Martí Alsina also visited Girona repeatedly, as can be observed from the hundreds of surviving sketches he made of the city. Some of these sketches are currently held in private collections while others are stored in the Museu Nacional d'Art de Catalunya (MNAC) and the Museum of Art Girona.

Martí Alsina's first attempts occurred in 1859, as confirmed by a letter sent to him from Girona dated 14 October 1859. The letter was a response to information solicited by the artist regarding flags and other details that would be included in the work; the painter wished the final result to be as realistic as possible. Due to the fact that he ordered a frame for the work to be made in March 1864, it is believed that his intention was to send the work to the National Exhibition of Fine Arts that year. However, when Martí Alsina received critical comments from friends regarding the piece, he decided instead to continue working on the canvas. He never signed the finished work, which remained in his studio during his lifetime.

Years later, Martí Alsina took advantage of some of the research material and sketches he had accumulated to create two works relating to the Siege of Girona -- Heroines of Girona, which was displayed in the 1868 Society of Exhibitions of the Fine Arts in Barcelona (Sociedad para Exposiciones de Bellas Artes, Barcelona) and The Company of Saint Barbara, which was displayed in the 1891 exhibition of the Palace of Fine Arts (Palau de les Belles Arts).

Personal documents confirm that Martí Alsina used The Great Day of Girona to guarantee a debt of 20,000 pesetas that he owed to Pau Borrell. As the painter was not able to settle the loan, Borrell assumed temporary ownership of the work. In 1894 Martí Alsina came to an agreement with the heirs of Borrell and succeeded in regaining ownership of the work in exchange for 14 others. An article published during that time in El Divulio claims that Martí Alsina subsequently attempted to sell the work to the City Council of Barcelona for a sum of 15,000 pesetas.

=== Title ===
Although The Great Day of Girona is the painting's most common title and its name in the catalogue of the MNAC, the work is sometimes referred to as The Defenders of Girona. The origin of the title is believed to be Colonel Blas de Fournàs, who described the events of 19 September 1809 (during which over 1,000 people died) as "the great day of Girona." In some of Martí Alsina’s personal documents, however, the piece was referred to as The Defenders of Girona and even The Painting of Girona.

=== Bombardment ===
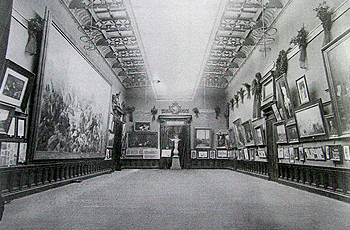
The Great Day of Girona in the Palace of Fine Arts, Barcelona

After Martí Alsina's death in 1894, Joan Nepomucè Font i Sangrà, a private collector and enthusiast of his work, acquired The Great Day of Girona and offered the work to the city council of Barcelona to be exhibited in the Exhibition of Fine Arts. The work, however, was first exhibited in 1898 as part of an exhibition organised to display the works of deceased artists. After this exhibition, the work was deposited in the Hall of Queen Regent in the Museum of Fine Arts, Barcelona (Museu Munincipal de Belles Arts de Barcelona) and later transferred to the Museum of Decorative Arts and Archaeology (Museu d’Arts Decoratives i Arqueològic). The work was still in storage by 1904, which sparked Font i Sangrà to question whether it was due to a lack of exhibition space or location that the work remained unseen ("si per manca de local no pot ser exposada"). Carles Bofarull, director of the Museum of Fine Arts, responded:

... A painting of large dimensions labelled ‘Girona’, by the deceased artist Martí y Alsina, was brought to the Museum of Reproductions from the vacated Hall of Queen Regent [...] Not believing that the most suitable place for its conservation was the Museum of Reproductions, it was placed in storage; its frame disassembled and the canvas rolled-up for storage. Currently, due to the works which are underway in the museum building, its presence is not suitable there and so it is asked that the Board determines what is to be done with the work

...al desocuparse el Salón de la Reina Regente fue llevado al Museo de Reproducciones el cuadro de gran tamaño titulado "Girona", obra del difunto artista Martí y Alsina, la cual formaba parte del Museo de Pintura en concepto de depósito. No creyendo que el lugar más adecuado para su conservación fuera el Museo de Reproducciones, fue llevado a los bajos del Museo de Arte Decorativo y Arqueológico, almacenado el marco y desmontado y enrollado el lienzo. Actualmente, debido a las obras que se están desarrollando en este edificio, no es conveniente su presencia allí, por lo cual pide a la junta que determine que conviene hacer.

Comunicació del Director dels Museus de Belles Arts a la Junta de Museus, 16-8-1904

In 1905, Font i Sangrà reclaimed the painting and, due to its dimensions, decided to hang it in a chapel (specially extended for the occasion) on his personal property in Cardadeu, Ca n’Eres Vall. While he kept the bulk of his personal collection at his home (38 Ronda de Sant Pere), The Great Day of Girona became somewhat of a tourist attraction in Cardadeu, as Font i Sagrà took pleasure in showing the work to all who came to see it. After some negotiation, the painting became the property of the City Council of Barcelona as a legacy and was accepted on 18 June 1929. The painting was subsequently added to the collection of the Palace of Fine Arts and put on permanent display in the Hall of Queen Regent. When the MNAC was created in 1934, many of the works from the Palace of Fine Arts were transferred to the National Palace; however, those of larger measurements such as The Great Day of Girona remained in the Palace of Fine Arts.

In 1938 during the Spanish Civil War, the Palace of Fine Arts was used as a location for meetings and conferences, and that summer, the glass building was the victim of a bombardment that destroyed its roof. The destruction caused damage to The Great Day of Girona, including cracks extending over five meters. Once the war ended, it was decided that until the work could be restored, due to its extraordinary size, it would be rolled up and stored for its protection at the MNAC. Restoration commenced in 2009.

=== The Restoration Process ===
To mark the bicentenary of the French War and the 1809 Siege of Girona, the Museum of Art, Girona and the historian Maria Lluïsa Faxedas held a commemorative exhibition. The Great Day of Girona was requested on loan from MNAC, but the work first needed to be restored. The restoration project was a joint effort between the MNAC, the Department of Culture of the government of Catalonia, and the Museum of Art, Girona and was financed by the foundation Caixa Girona. Until this point, the painting had been stored in one of the reserves of the MNAC for over seventy years, except for a small intervention in 1998 when the work was rolled out and photographed while the piece was moved between the museum's internal reserves.

=== Organoleptic Examination ===
On 14 September 2009, a team of experts from the MNAC and the Centre de Restauració de Bens Mobles de Catalunya (CRBMC), under the direction of Mireia Mestre, Míria Pedragosa and Maite Tomeu, began to roll out the canvas for its inspection in the Oval Hall of the National Palace, Barcelona.

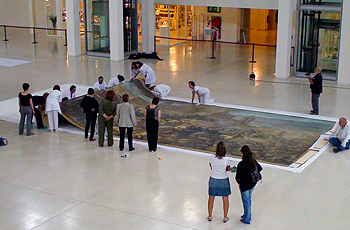
The Great Day of Girona in the Oval Hall, MNAC

Over three days, an organoleptic examination of the piece was undertaken before it was prepared for shipment to the CRBMC in Valldoreix. The examination included a study of both the front and back of the canvas, macroscopic and microscopic observations of the materials, and samples were taken in order to carry out various physical and chemical analysis of the painting.

The painting was photographed using techniques including ultraviolet light and transillumination. Research regarding the reserves of the museum and works by artists of the same period was conducted in order to make relevant comparisons to the state of The Great Day of Girona. Due to the peculiarity of the great dimensions of the work, it was saved from more invasive restoration procedures such as relining or general varnishing, techniques that were common artwork conservation practices at the time.

==== Restoration in Valldoreix ====
During the restoration, a first-of-its kind in Catalan history due to its scale, Martí Alsina’s manuscripts and images of the painting (before its damage in 1938), were used as references. Before commencing the restoration, physicochemical studies were conducted, samples of primer, paint and varnish were analysed, and reflectographies were taken. The analysis of the canvas material was undertaken in collaboration with the Technical Centre of Spinning (el Centre Tècnic de Filatura) of the Polytechnic University in Barcelona. Throughout the restoration project, the work was documented and photographed, and its progression was reported in the media. Each process during the restoration was realised according to the criterion of minimum intervention.

The team divided the restorative tasks into phases to accommodate the piece's large dimensions. The process began with the reverse side. Examinations indicated that the preparatory layer was made from a mixture of white led barium sulfate and calcium carbonate. The fabric of the canvas had a large tear nearly 7 feet (2.1 m) long. The tear was sutured, thread by thread, using a mixture of sturgeon glue and wheat starch. The canvas's face was cleaned in two phases: the first consisted of removing dust that had accumulated on the surface. The second involved using a gel solution to remove dirt that had become attached to the surface. Any polychrome losses were then replaced by applying a putty made from ground calcite (also known as "blanc d’Espanya") and rabbit-skin glue. The restoration of The Great Day of Girona is considered an exceptional project due to its application of minimum intervention criteria and use of innovative techniques and has become a benchmark of restoration work throughout Spain.

=== Installation in Girona ===
The restored work was installed on 14 September 2010 in the Josep Irla Auditorium of the Old Hospital of Santa Caterina, Girona, where it had been moved directly from the restoration centre in Valldoreix. The work was transported in a truck and unloaded by a team of eight handlers under the supervision of a team of restorers and other professionals.

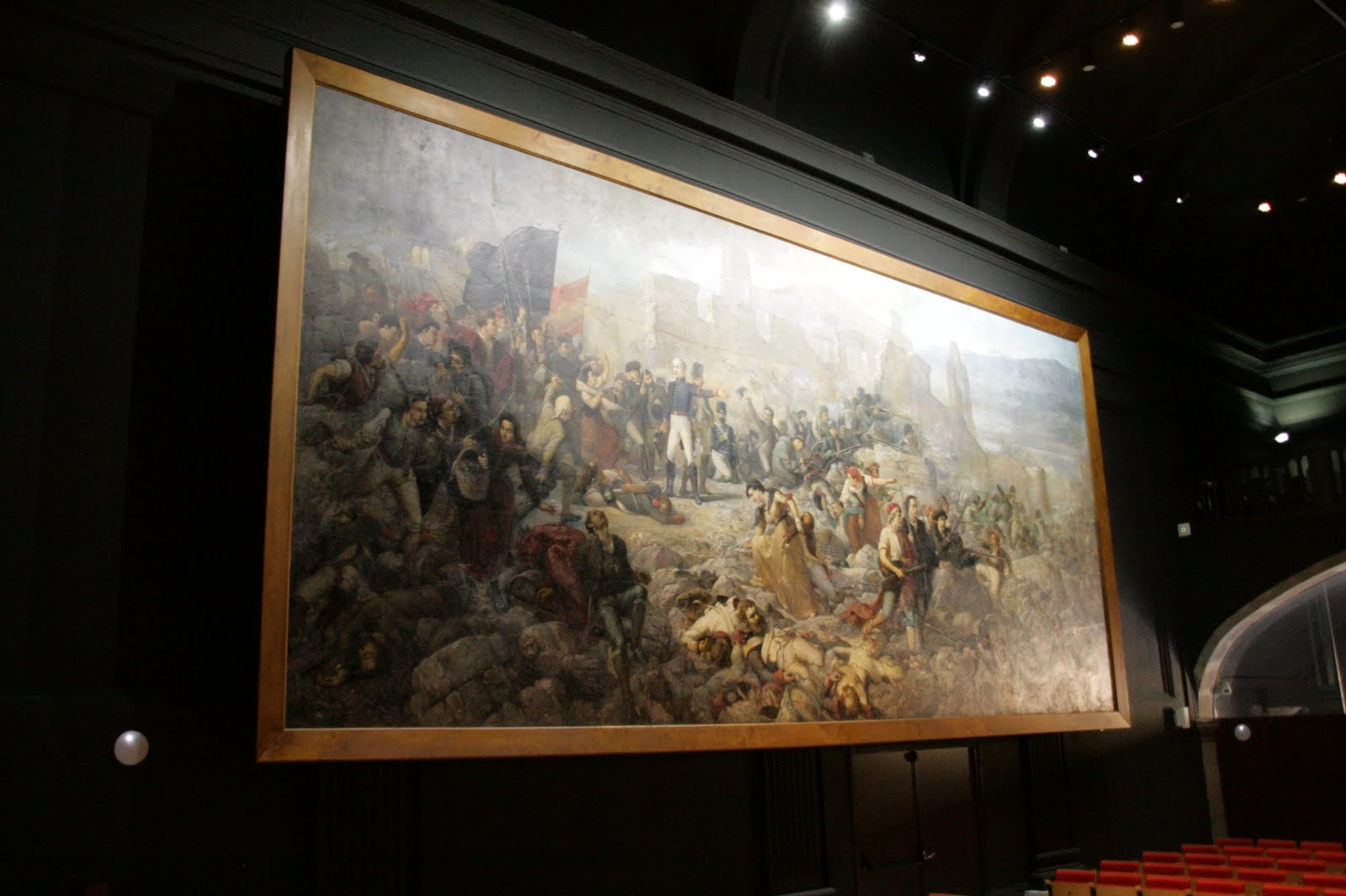
The painting in the Josep Irla Auditorium

To ensure correct handling, Chassitech construction company was hired to create a metallic structure (a double-railed anodized aluminum frame with wooden profiles) designed to facilitate future maintenance. The staff at the Museum of Art, Girona, assumed responsibility for the climate control of the painting's new environment and ensured that its lighting levels did not exceed 150–200 lux. Between 14 and 16 September. the work hung from the aluminum structure and was presented to the press a few days after its installation.

The inauguration of its exhibition took place on 23 October 2010. During 2012, Google Art Project, together with MNAC, chose the painting to be photographed as part of the collection of their online platform.

== Description ==
The Great Day of Girona spans 446 × 1082 cm, larger than the Battle of Tetuan by Fortuny (300 × 972 cm) and Guernica by Pablo Picasso. The painting was realised on a single piece of canvas cloth without the use of seams and weighs approximately 70 kilograms (150 lb). Textile experts believe it may be the same type of fabric used in the production of boat sails. Other studies suggest that the fabric may have been acquired in Maresme or Poblenou, where the artist had another workshop.

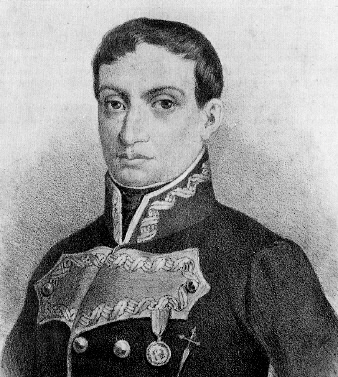
General Mariano Alvarez de Castro

The work portrays the aftermath of a battle that took place on 19 September 1809, during a 7-month siege of the city of Girona by the invading French army during the Peninsular War. The attack was resisted on the orders of General Álvarez de Castro. The architecture of the scene confirms that the painting depicts the location of the events: The towers of the Cathedral of Girona and the church of St. Felix can be seen in the background, the walls of the city and the Gironella Tower zone are in front. Preparatory drawings indicate that Martí Alsina chose to depict the battle scene in the area of La caserna dels Alemanys (the headquarters of the Germans) in order to simultaneously paint a classical profile of the city of Girona and depict a location where other important battles of the siege had taken place.

Although stylistically Martí Alsina is commonly compared to Courbet and realism (a movement which the painter introduced to Catalonia), The Great Day of Girona is closer to Romanticism.

Martí Alsina's pictorial composition resembles that of French historical painter Horace Vernes. Both artists produced a great quantity of preliminary sketches from different perspectives to effectively depict a mass of figures within their final works.

Martí Alsina had visited a retrospective exhibition organised as part of the Universal Exhibition of 1855, viewing historical paintings by Vernet, Ingres, Delacroix and Alexandre Gabriel Decamps.

The work is divided into three planes. The figures in the foreground are the most realistic and dramatic and are treated with more lively colours. The figures in the middle ground of the work are less defined, and those in the background are only suggested and seem to fade into the architecture as if in a fog.

The scenes on the right-hand side are arranged in a pyramid shape, with the apex situated in the ruins of the background of the picture plane. The left-hand side of the pyramid is formed by the entrenched defenders and forms a line that cuts the entire space in a diagonal line and that draws attention to the military figures, despite their placement in the middle plane.

The group of figures situated in the left-hand side is formed by the last line of defenders of the city, with General Alvarez de Castro prominently portrayed.

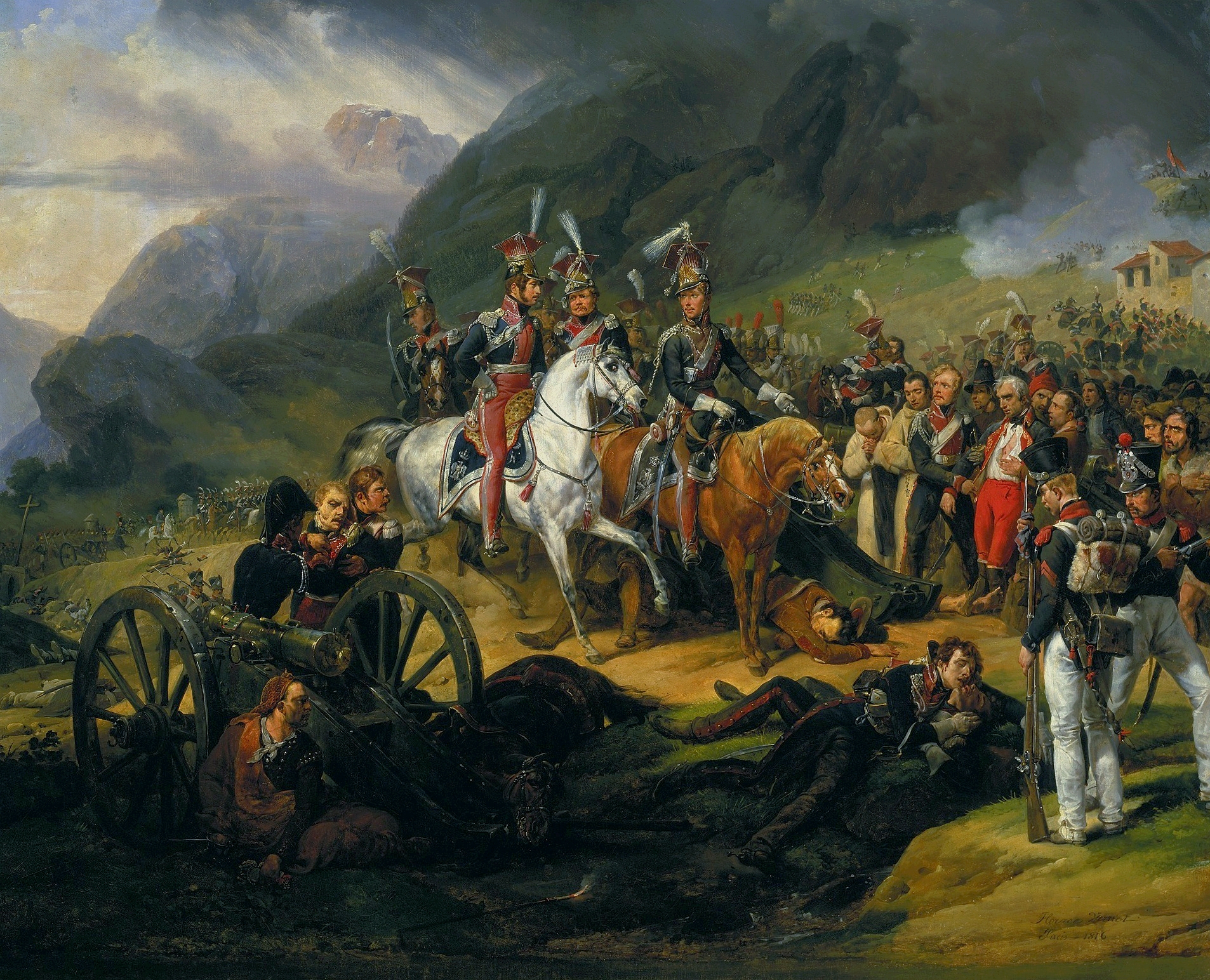
The Battle of Somosierra by Horace Vernet

The composition is similar to that of Vernet’s The Battle of Somosierra of 1816, where the mountain in the background frames the figures on horseback and creates a competition of importance with the wounded foreground figures.

In the bottom section of The Great Day of Girona, or the foreground of the battle, the wounded and dead are depicted, employing maximum realism for the most dramatic images. One figure, situated at the centre of the composition, below the figure of the General, represents the same type of female figure as found in another of Martí Alsina’s works, The Company of Saint Barbara. She is typical of military bodies, who assist the wounded in battle. She wears a red ribbon tied in a loop on her left arm, distinguishing her as an aide. More of these similar female aid-figures can be observed – some helping the injured and others distributing food and drink.

At the extreme right, the retreating French Army can be seen, the figures blurred to such an extent that they avoid important presence in the composition.

== Exhibition ==
The painting has been exhibited publicly in two locations. The first was the Palace of Fine Arts in Barcelona, where it was shown in 1898 as part of an exhibition paying homage to recently deceased artists. Since 8 June 2011, the History Museum of Girona has displayed one of Martí Alsina’s preparatory drawings for The Great Day of Girona.

=== The Anatomy of a Painting ===
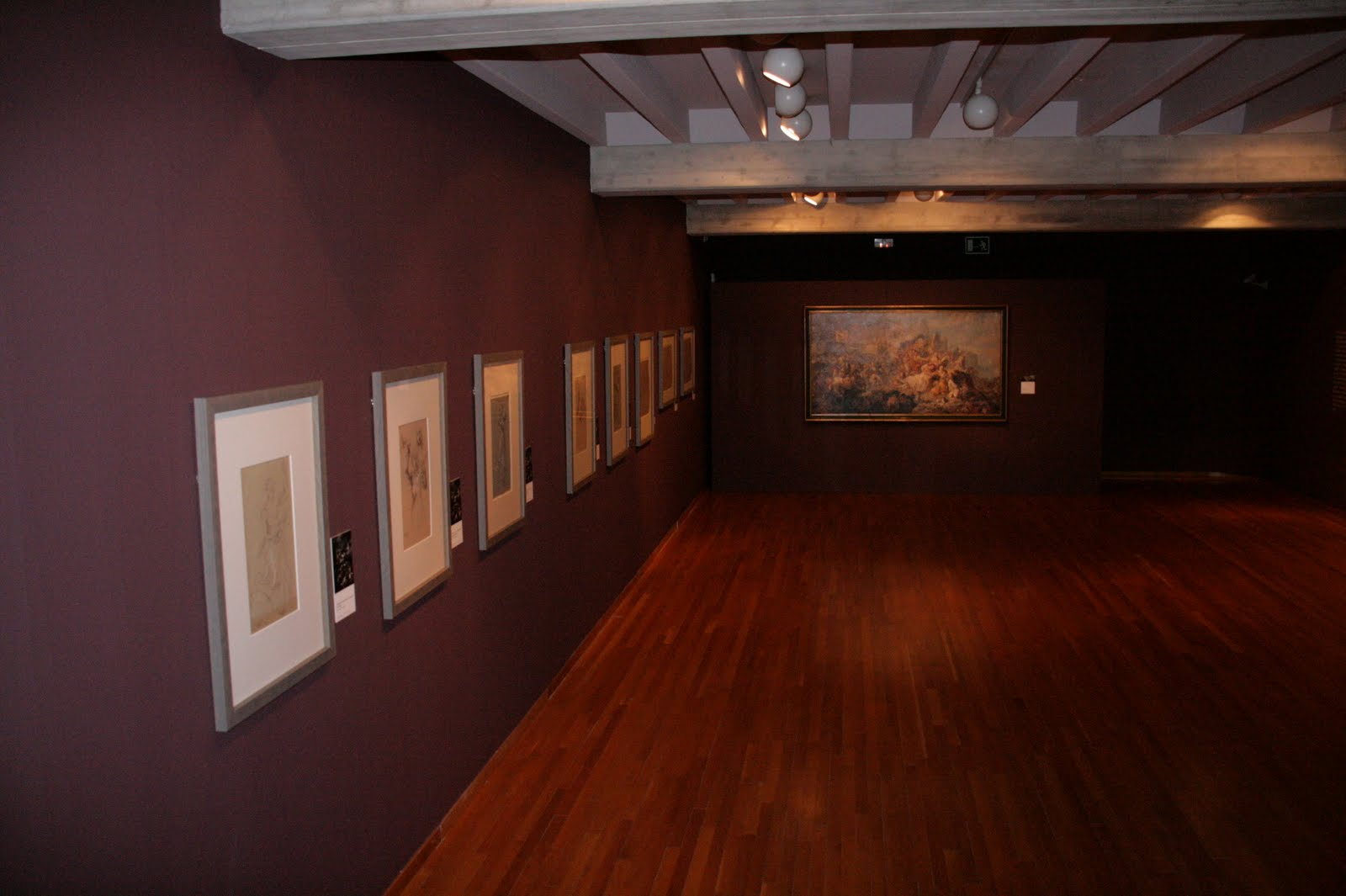
'The Anatomy of a Painting'

Following the restoration and translation of the painting, an exhibition entitled "Ramon Martí Alsina. The Great Day of Girona. Anatomy of a Painting" was held from 23 October 2010 to 29 May 2011. The exhibition was organised by the Museum of Art Girona in collaboration with MNAC and was curated by Maria Lluïsa Faxedas, professor at the University of Girona and an expert on the subject. The objective of the exhibition was to investigate the painter's motives for realising the work and was held in three locations in Girona:

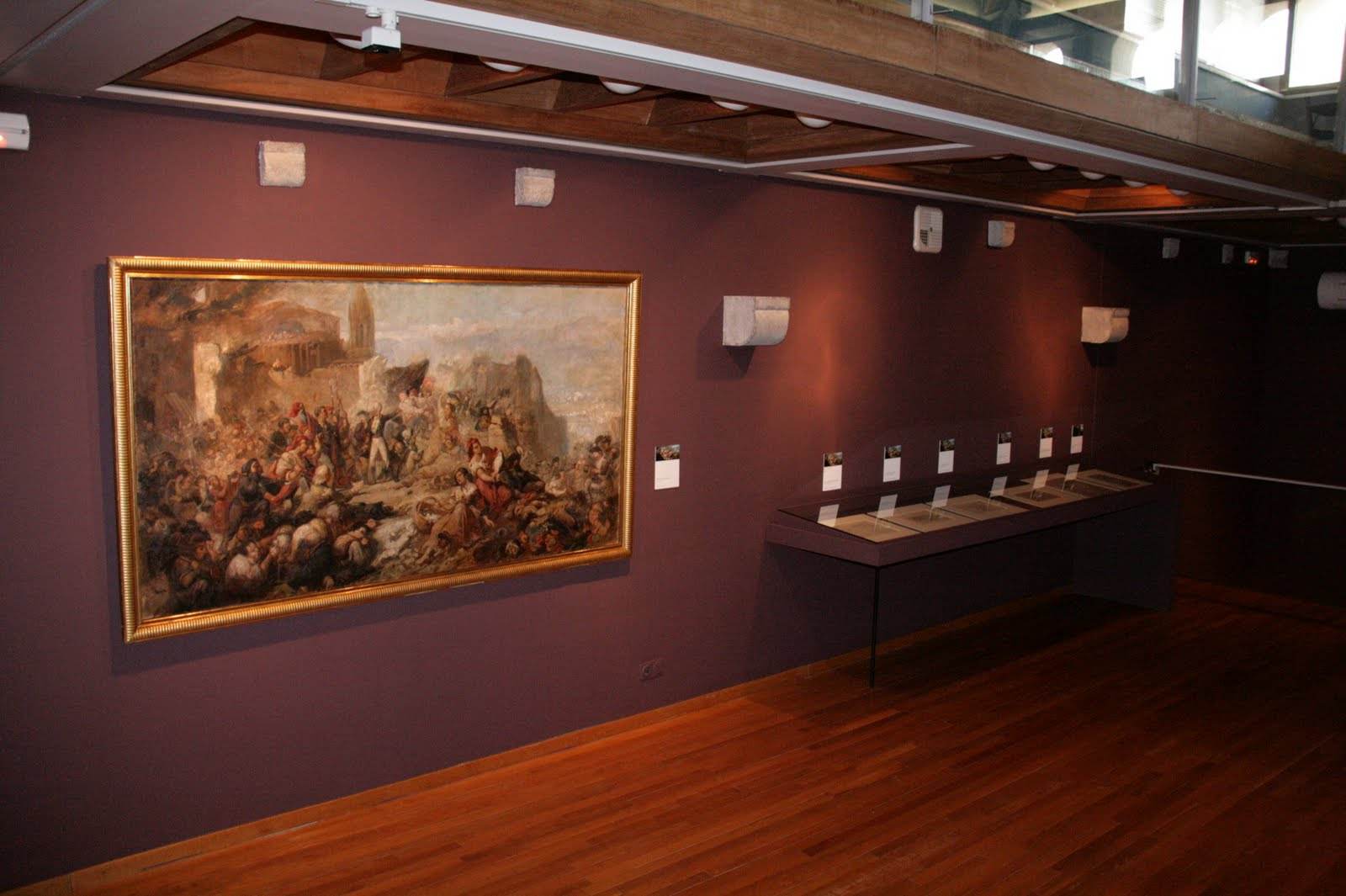
'The Anatomy of a Painting'

- Josep Irla Auditorium: situated in the government of Girona, it is the definitive space where the painting is exhibited
- Plenary Hall of the Council of Girona: permanent exhibition space of the ‘Heroines of Girona’, another work by Martí Alsina
- Museum of Art Girona: exhibition of sketches and preparatory drawings based on the work

== Other Versions ==
The subject matter of the siege of Girona has been treated by several artists on several occasions and various versions of the theme exist;

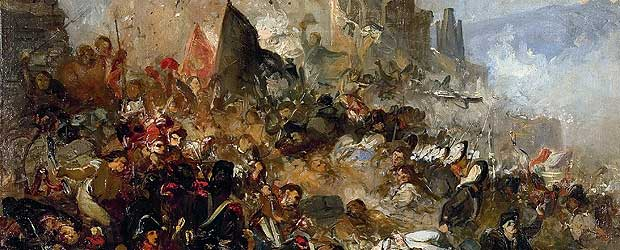
'The Siege of Girona 1809'

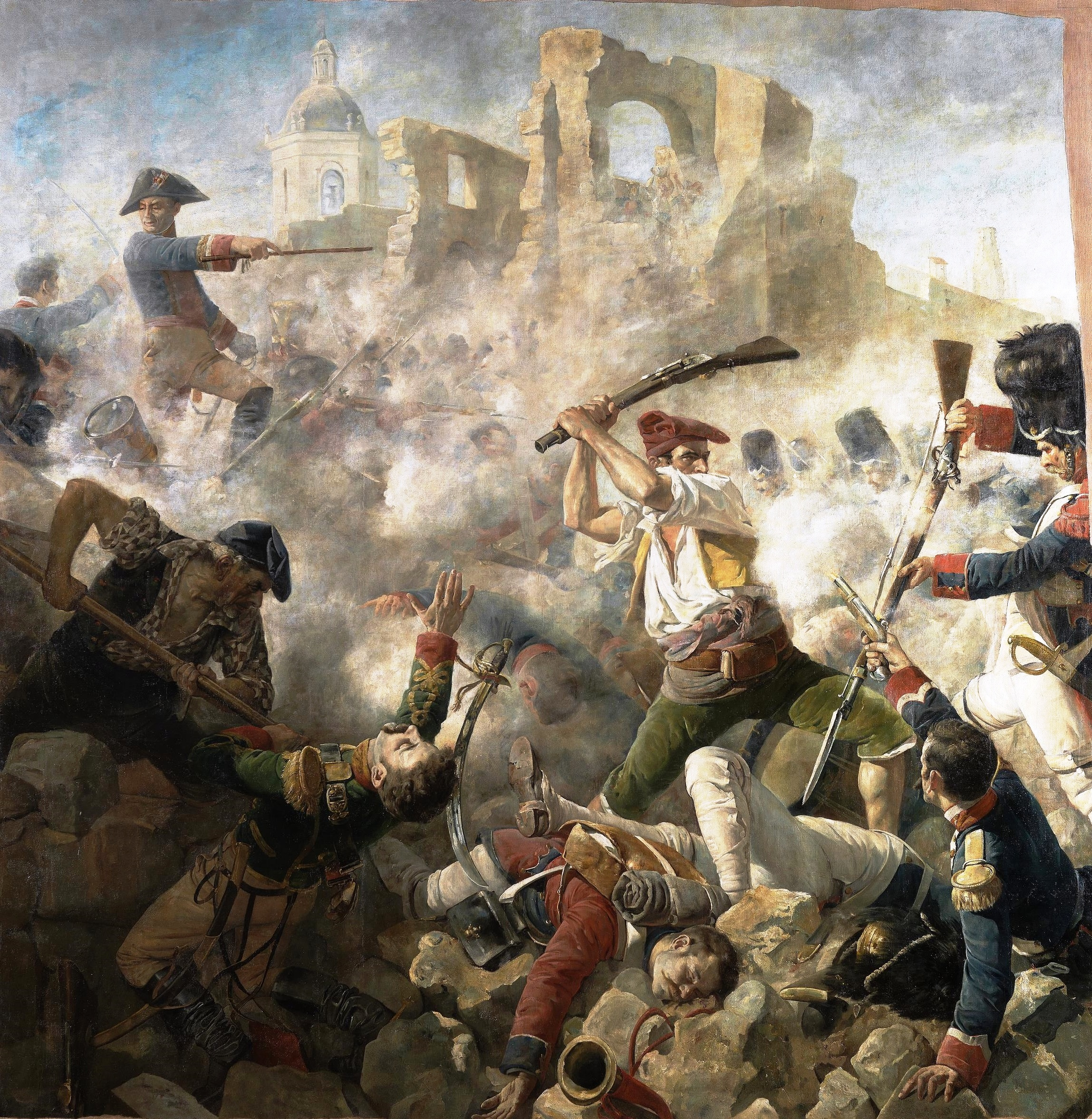
César Álvarez Dumont - The Great Day of Girona

- In the Museum of Art Girona The Siege of Girona 1809, or Study for the Great Day of Girona (1860) exists, which is a reduced version of the painting (47 x 84.5 cm), painted and signed by Martí Alsina.
- César Álvarez Dumont (Portugal 1866 – Malaga 1945), the artist painted his own version of the siege in 1890. The piece has the same title as Martí Alsina’s work, The Great Day of Girona, and is currently in the collection of the Prado, Madrid.
- Laureà Barrau painted the Surrender of Girona, 1809 (Rome, 1884), which is currently part of a private collection in Girona.
