= Joaquín Mendoza =

Spanish military officer

Joaquín Mendoza (Pamplona, Navarra, c. 1733–Gerona, 1809) was a Spanish field marshal and military governor of Gerona.

== Early career ==
Mendoza studied at the Military Academy of Barcelona from 1752 to 1754 and was promoted to second lieutenant of the 1st Artillery Battalion in February 1756.

In 1764, he was appointed sergeant major of the Company of Cadets at the Royal College of Artillery at Segovia, where he was promoted successively until February 1774, when he was appointed lieutenant colonel of the 1st Artillery Battalion.

At the outbreak of the War of the Pyrenees he was sent to the Army of Rosellón, where he was promoted to colonel in October 1793 and colonel of Artillery the following year. As the commanding officer of Artillery at Sant Ferran Castle, he was taken prisoner when the fortress, against his judgement, capitulated on 29 November 1794.

He was interned in Francia, and on his return to Spain was court-martialled and absolved in 1799, as well as being promoted to brigadier.

During the War of the Oranges (1801), as the commander of the batteries that led to the capitulation of the fortress, Mendoza participated at the siege of Campo Maior.

Following the signing of the Treaty of Badajoz, which ceded Olivenza to Spain, in December 1801 Mendoza was appointed military governor of the fortress, post he held until the following July, when he was appointed military governor of Gerona. In 1802 he was promoted to field marshal.

== Peninsular War ==
At the outbreak of the war, a popular uprising forced Mendoza to give up his post as military governor, and Julian Bolivar was appointed interim governor in June 1808.

When General Álvarez de Castro took command of the fortress, Mendoza offered his services in the defence of the fortified town. He was stationed at the Sarracines gatehouse where, on 24 August 1809, during the third siege, he was gravely wounded in the head, dying from his wound the following December.
