= Siege of Gerona =

Siege of Gerona may refer to:

- Conquest of Girona (785), part of the creation of the Marca Hispanica
- Siege of Girona (793), part of the creation of the Marca Hispanica
- Siege of Girona (827), part of the revolt of Aisso
- Siege of Girona (1285), part of the Aragonese Crusade
- Siege of the citadel of Girona (1462), part of the Catalan Civil War
- Siege of Girona (1653), part of the Franco-Spanish War (1635–1659)
- Siege of Girona (1684), part of the War of the Reunions
- Siege of Girona (1694), part of the War of the Grand Alliance
- Siege of Girona (1710–1711), part of the War of the Spanish Succession
- Siege of Girona (1712–1713), part of the War of the Spanish Succession
- First siege of Girona (Peninsular War) (1808)
- Second siege of Girona (Peninsular War) (1808)
- Third siege of Girona (Peninsular War) (1809)
