= Julián Bolívar =

Spanish military officer

Julián Bolívar (Bilbao, Vizcaya, c. 1750–1815) was a Spanish field marshal.

== Early career ==
Bolívar joined the Queen's Dragoon Regiment (Regimiento de Dragones de la Reina) as a cadet in August 1754, and was promoted to alfárez in December 1766. In November 1770, he was promoted to alfárez of Grenadiers and to lieutenant of Grenadiers the following year. His regiment saw no action while it was garrisoned at different towns between 1763 and 1778.

During the Anglo-French War (1778–1783), the regiment was stationed in Galicia. He was promoted to captain in 1789, and in March 1808, as a captain of carabiniers, he was appointed teniente del rey (equivalent to the British lord-lieutenant) for Gerona.

== Peninsular War ==
At the outbreak of the war, a popular uprising forced the military governor, Field marshal Mendoza, to give up his post and Bolívar was appointed interim governor and president of the war committee in June 1808. As commander-in-chief of the forces at Gerona, he repelled two French attacks, led by General Duhesme, on 20 June and 20 July.

Promoted to brigadier, Bolívar relinquished his interim command to the new military governor, General Álvarez de Castro, and returned to his earlier appointment of teniente de rey. He again distinguished himself in defending the fortified town against attacks by Saint-Cyr and, later, Augereau.

With Álvarez de Castro gravely ill, Bolívar once again took provisional charge on 9 December and, on 10 December 1809, capitulated.

After the war, Bolívar was reinstated as a brigadier, 20 October 1815, and two days later, Fernando VII promoted him to field marshal.
