= Montjuïc (disambiguation) =

Montjuïc is a hill in Barcelona, Catalonia, Spain.

Montjuïc, meaning Mount of the Jews, may also refer to:

== Barcelona, Spain ==
- Montjuïc Castle, a 17th-century military fortress
- Montjuïc Cemetery, a modern-day cemetery

== Girona ==
- Montjuïc (Girona)

== Battles ==
- Battle of Montjuïc (1641), during the Reapers' War
- Battle of Montjuïc (1705), during the War of the Spanish Succession

== Other uses ==
- Mont Juic (suite), an orchestral composition written jointly by Lennox Berkeley and Benjamin Britten

== See also ==
- ca:Montjuïc (disambiguation) Other articles relating to Montjuïc in the Catalan Wikipedia
