= Ramon Martí Alsina =

Spanish painter

Ramón Martí Alsina
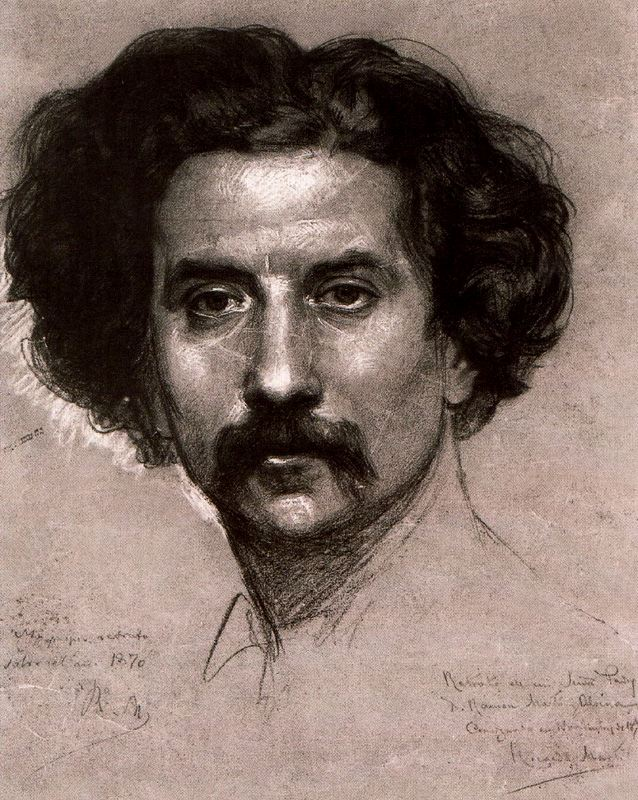
- Ramón Martí Alsina, Self-portrait, 1870
- Born: Ramón Martí i Alsina'; 10 August 1826; Barcelona, Catalonia, Spain
- Died: 21 December 1894 (aged 68); Barcelona, Catalonia, Spain
- Known for: Painter, teacher
- Movement: Orientalist

Ramón Martí i Alsina (10 August 1826, Barcelona - 21 December 1894, Barcelona) was a Spanish painter in the Realistic style.

== Biography ==
He was born to the humble family of a city official and was orphaned at the age of eight. He was then raised by his godfather, who was opposed to his plans to become an artist. Accordingly, he began to study philosophy (and eventually earned a bachelor's degree in that subject) but also attended night classes at the Escola de la Llotja. His first attempts at being a professional artist took place in his mother's home town of Mataró, where he gained a modest reputation with the local bourgeoisie as a portrait painter. At this time, his primary inspiration still came from nature; spending his free time painting in the mountains and along the coast of Maresme.

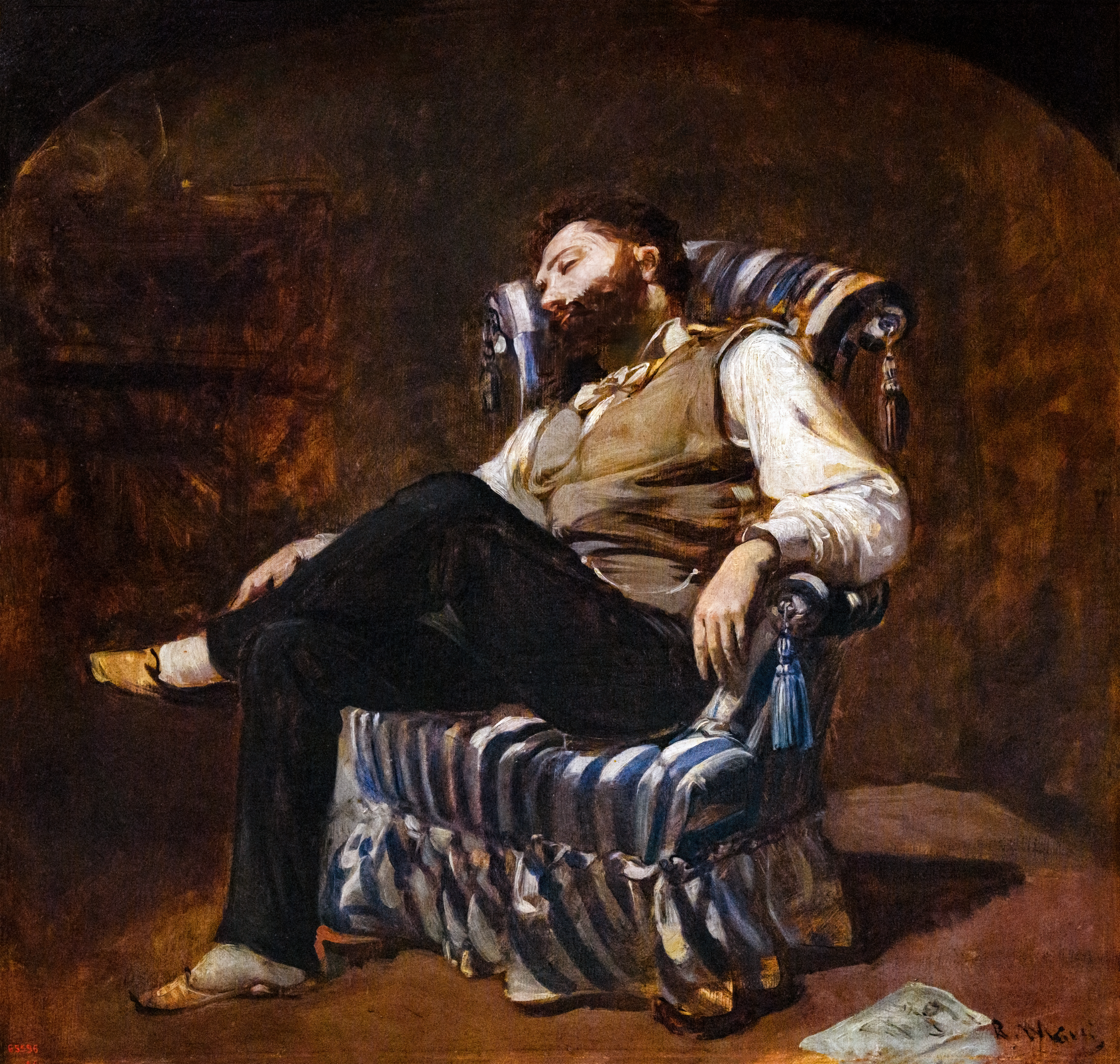
The Siesta (1884), his most familiar work.

In 1848, he went to París, where he visited the Louvre and acquainted himself with the works of Horace Vernet and Eugène Delacroix. Later, he discovered the works of Gustave Courbet and came under the influence of the Barbizon school. Four years later, he became a professor of drawing at La Llotja. He was also one of the first to introduce the concept of plein-air painting to his students. His first major exhibition was at the Exposición General de Bellas Artes of Barcelona in 1851. He became a corresponding member of the Reial Acadèmia Catalana de Belles Arts de Sant Jordi in 1855.

=== Difficulties ===
As a result of his earlier philosophical studies, he was attracted to Positivism, Republicanism and Anti-clericalism and identified with the ideals of the Revolution of 1868. During the reign of King Amadeo I, he resigned from La Llotja (although some sources say he was dismissed) because he wouldn't swear allegiance to the Spanish Constitution of 1869. After the declaration of the First Spanish Republic, he was among those rehabilitated by general order of President Francisco Pi y Margall.

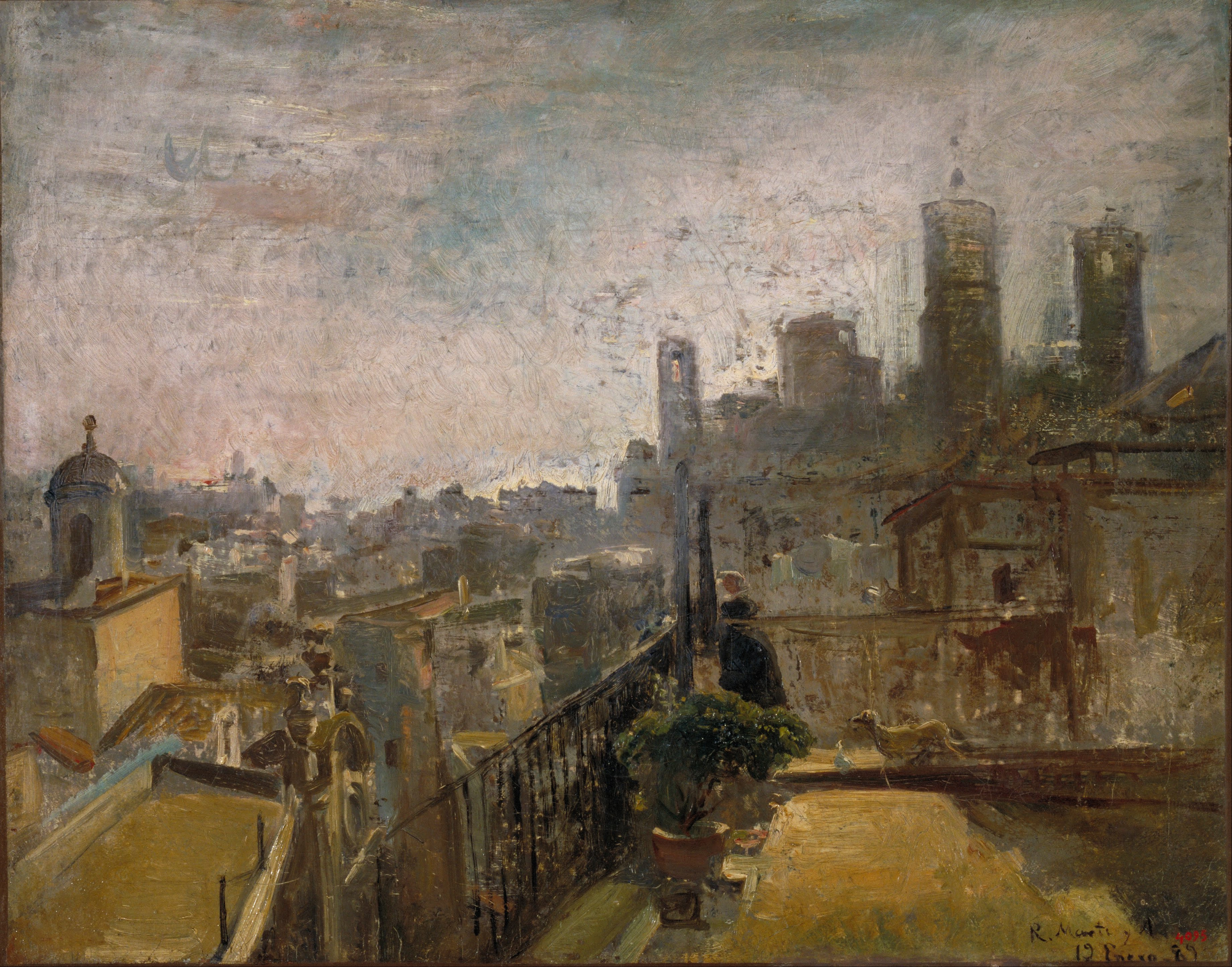
View of Barcelona from a Rooftop in Riera de Sant Joan (1889)

During the Seventies, his work entered what was perhaps his most creative phase while his personal life was touched by tragedy. In 1872, his son and daughter both died within a few days of each other and he lost his wife in 1878. At the same time, he went heavily into debt. This forced him to increase his artistic output, almost to the point of creating on an assembly line. He briefly had seven separate workshops open to accommodate his works in progress. Most of them were largely produced by his employees, and only the finishing touches were provided by the artist himself. Over 4,000 paintings from this period bear his signature. Eventually, in 1889, he was able to remarry, but economic problems hounded him for the rest of his life.

Despite all that, a large part of his life was spent obsessed with completing his cycle of paintings on the Peninsular War and the two sieges of Girona, which he had begun in 1863 with "The Great Day of Girona"; measuring an impressive 16 x 35 feet. The cycle was never completed.

== Selected paintings ==
=== From the Girona Cycle ===
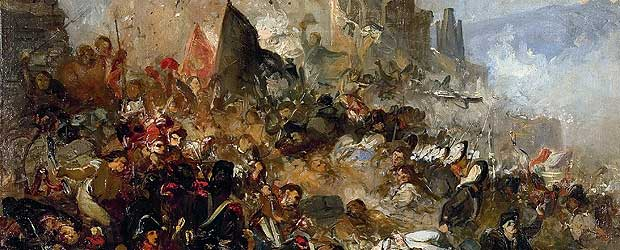
The Third Siege of Girona

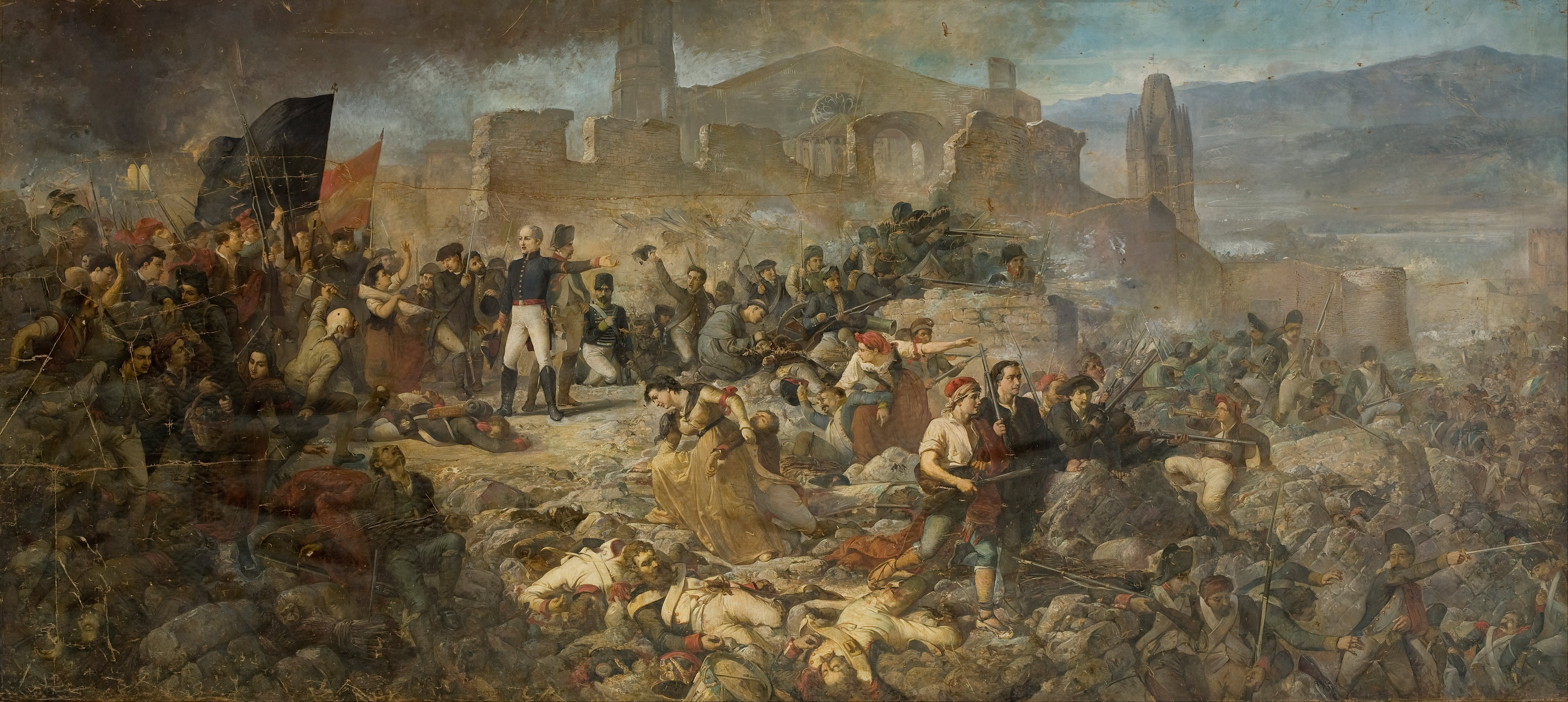
The Great Day of Girona

=== Other works ===
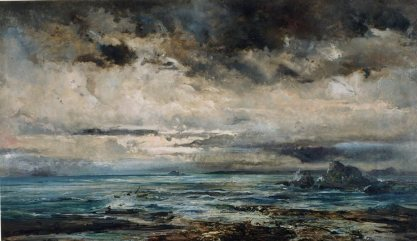
Stormy Sea

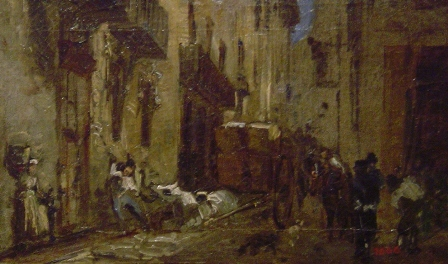
Urban Cityscape

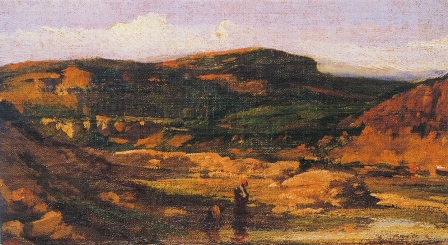
Country landscape

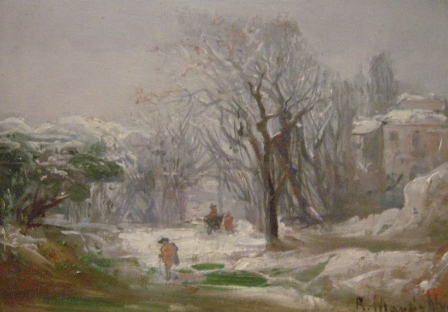
Rural Landscape with Figures
