= Third siege of Girona (Peninsular War) =

1809 Siege during the Peninsular War

Siege of Girona
- Part of the Peninsular War
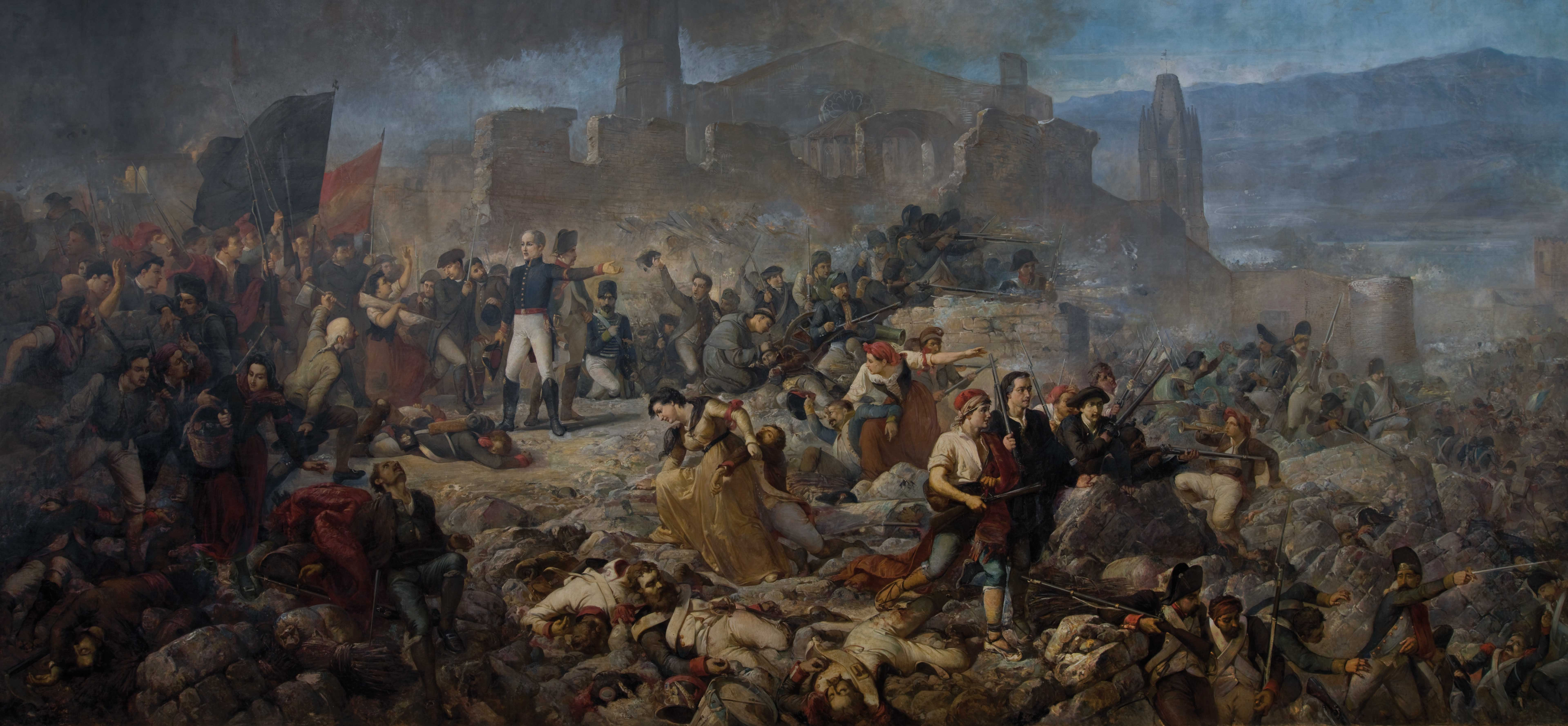
- The Great Day of Girona by Ramón Martí Alsina (1864). The painting depicts the defeat of the French, seen retreating down the hill to the right, at the end of the battle on 19 September 1809.
Date	6 May – 12 December 1809
Location	Girona, Spain 41.99361°N 2.83167°E
Result	French victory

Belligerents
France; Kingdom of Westphalia	Spain

Commanders and leaders
Laurent de Gouvion St-Cyr; Pierre Augereau	(Spain) Mariano Álvarez de Castro

Strength
17,000 siege regulars 15,000 covering army	5,700 regulars and militia 3,600 reinforcements 1,100 citizens and clerics

Casualties and losses
14,000 dead, wounded, or ill	5,000 dead 1,200 wounded 3,000 captured
- Girona is located in Catalonia, Spain, 70 km south of the border with France.

Peninsular War: Aragón Catalonia
current battle

The third siege of Girona occurred in northern Catalonia, Spain from 6 May to 12 December 1809, during the Napoleonic Wars. A significant event of the Peninsular War, France's Grande Armée lay siege to the town of Girona for seven months. Girona was strategically important because it controlled the main road between France and Spain.

Some 32,000 French and Westphalian troops besieged the town. General Laurent de Gouvion Saint-Cyr was in command of the French during much of the siege. Marshal Pierre Augereau took command after 12 October. The Girona defense was under General Mariano Álvarez de Castro, with about 9,000 regular troops and militiamen. Girona held out until disease and famine compelled it to capitulate.

Though badly outnumbered, the Spanish defenders forced a lengthy siege, and a large French army was pinned down for an entire campaigning season. The battle became legendary over the course of Spain's War of Independence, and Álvarez became a national hero.

== Background ==
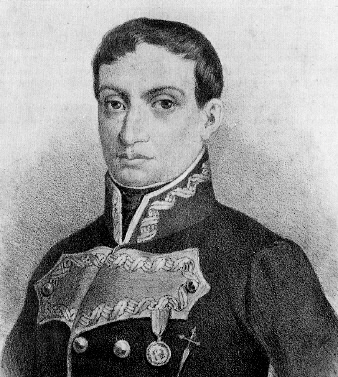
General Mariano Álvarez de Castro

In 1808 Joseph Bonaparte acceded to the throne of Spain, effectively making Spain a client state to Napoleonic France. Spain's resistance to France precipitated the Peninsular War 1808–1814. In 1809 General Álvarez, commander of Montjuïc Castle in Barcelona, was ordered by his superiors to surrender the castle to the French, although he had been preparing to resist. Álvarez left Barcelona and joined the Spanish rebels against French rule.

The Spanish Government in Cádiz named Álvarez commander of the Army of Catalonia and Governor of Girona. The city of Girona was on the main road between France and Spain, hence it was strategically important. The French had twice besieged the town the year before, first in the Battle of Girona 20–21 June, and then in the three-week Second siege of Girona from 24 July to 16 August, both times having to retreat. The French had captured the nearby coastal city of Roses and its citadel in the Siege of Roses in late 1808.

Taking command of the city on 1 February 1809, Álvarez immediately started preparing its defense, requesting provisions for 7,000 men. The city of Girona at that time had a population of between 13,000 and 14,000, and it was defended by a garrison of about 5,700. The defenders of Girona included the "Irish" Ultonia Regiment. The women of the town organized into a Company of Santa Barbara to care for the sick and wounded, transport ammunition, and other tasks. On 1 April, Álvarez proclaimed his famous edict, to the effect that if the city were attacked, he would immediately execute anybody that mentioned surrender or capitulation. On 3 May, arms were distributed to 1,717 volunteers.

The fortifications of Girona were antiquated since nothing had been done to modernize them since the War of the Spanish Succession a hundred years earlier. The medieval walls were thin, so they often could not support artillery. The area of the Mercadal, to the west of the River Onyar, was particularly weakly fortified. The French did not attack there, however, fearing the dangers of artillery fire from the heights of Girona and the difficulty of street fighting after their recent experience in the second siege of Zaragoza earlier in the year. Moreover, the siege works for an attack on the Mercadal would have had to be dug on the flood plains of the River Ter, and flooding was not uncommon. The wall fortifications were augmented by surrounding bastions such as La Merced and Santa Maria by the Onyar to the south and north of Girona, respectively, and the several forts and redoubts (Capuchins, Chapter, Calvary, etc.) along the crest of the mountain behind Girona. Although Montjuïc Castle, just to the north of Girona, was well-supplied with cannon, there were less than 300 men who were experienced with artillery. Nevertheless, Álvarez made the most of the defenses.

== Siege ==
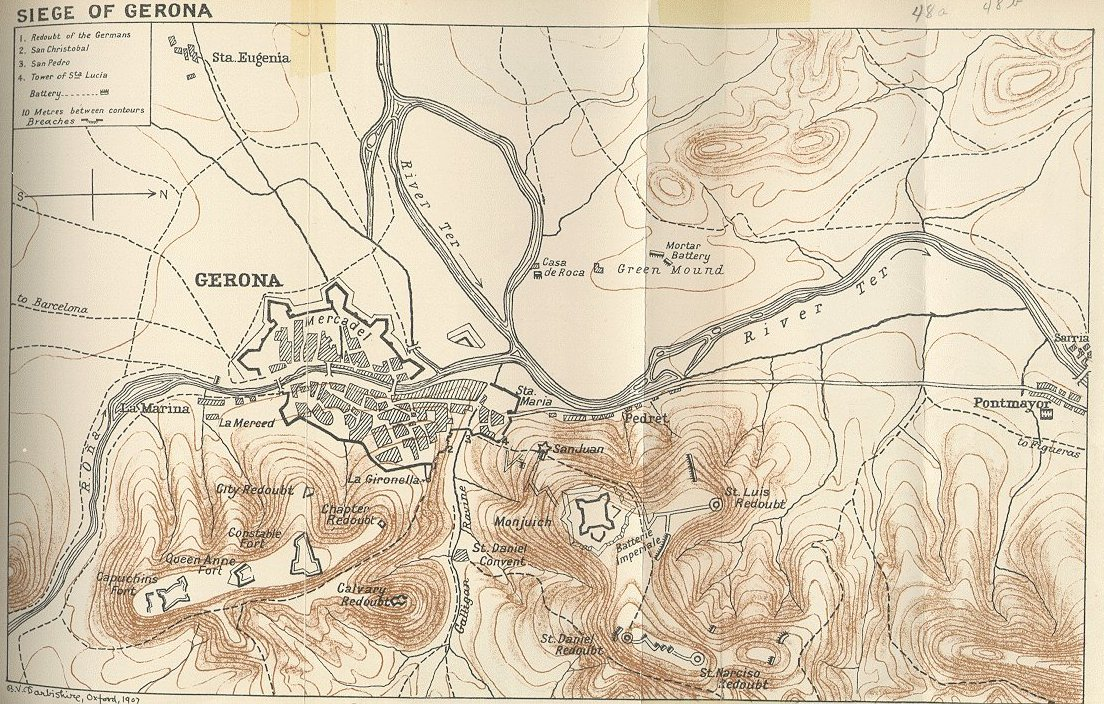
Map of the third siege of Girona in 1809, indicating city defenses and French deployments around the city. The direction of north is to the right.

At the beginning of May 1809, General Saint-Cyr began setting up artillery batteries and fortifications, mounting 40 gun batteries. The French forces consisted of over 17,000 men led by general Honoré Charles Reille, soon superseded by general Jean-Antoine Verdier, engaged in the siege, and an additional 15,000 men in a covering army led by Saint-Cyr, used to protect and reinforce the siege. On 12 June, Álvarez rejected the terms of a truce offered, and Saint-Cyr ordered bombardment to commence after midnight 13–14 June. Over the next seven months some 20,000 bombs and grenades and 80,000 cannonballs were fired into the city and the adjacent Montjuïc Castle.

After three weeks of heavy bombardment, on 7 July the French attempted to take the castle by frontal assault. Verdier employed 2,500 men in the attempt, and although the cannons of the fort had been silenced, he still lost over a thousand men to unrelenting musket fire. The French were forced to retreat. They resumed bombardment of the fort, reducing three sides of the castle to ruins. With little water left and the French siege works arriving at the castle moat, on 11 August the remaining defenders of the castle took what supplies they could, evacuated to Girona, and blew up the castle. There was little left of the castle when the French took possession. Álvarez then barricaded and entrenched the city, and the siege continued for another four months. Attempts to relieve the city by General Joaquín Blake were weak and only minimally successful. Reinforcements of only 3,600 troops were able to enter Girona during the siege.

The French strategy had been to take Montjuïc, after which Girona was expected to surrender, but in September another entreaty from the French for the Spanish to surrender was rejected. The French began their first direct assault on the city on 19 September. The incessant bombardment, now also from nearby Montjuïc, had breached several holes in the city's northern defensive walls. After bloody hand-to-hand combat and repeated assaults were repulsed, the French finally abandoned the attempt and retreated. The French lost 624 soldiers in the attack, while the Spanish lost 251. The event demoralized the French and rallied the Spanish.

Towards the end of September, General Saint-Cyr left his command, angered by the fact he was to be replaced as the head of the French and Allied force. He left the troops without an overall commander for several days, in clear disobedience of orders received in June. He was replaced by Marshal Augereau, who assumed command of the siege on 12 October. After the bloody engagements of August and September, the French adopted a more patient strategy, attempting to force surrender by starvation and disease.

In December Álvarez, seriously ill and delirious, handed over command to Brigadier Juan Bolivar. The French had taken several important fortifications of the city, and the Spanish were in retreat within the city itself. Two days later, on 12 December, the town finally capitulated. On the Spanish side, it is estimated that some 10,000 soldiers and civilians died during the siege, mostly from disease or famine. Only about 8,000 of the original 14,000 inhabitants of the city survived, while about 3,000 emaciated soldiers remained to surrender. French losses were approximately 14,000, over half of those to disease.

== Aftermath ==
After the extensive bombardment by artillery and 7 months of siege, the town of Girona was virtually uninhabitable. There was little of value left in the city for the French. As described by Charles Oman in his A History of the Peninsular War (1908), Girona

... presented a melancholy vista of houses roofless, or with one or two of the side-walls knocked in, of streets blocked by the fallen masonry of churches or towers, under which half-decayed corpses were partially buried. The open spaces were strewn with broken muskets, bloody rags, wheels of disabled guns and carts, fragments of shells, and the bones of horses and mules whose flesh had been eaten. The stench was so dreadful that Augereau had to keep his troops out of the place, lest infection should be bred among them.

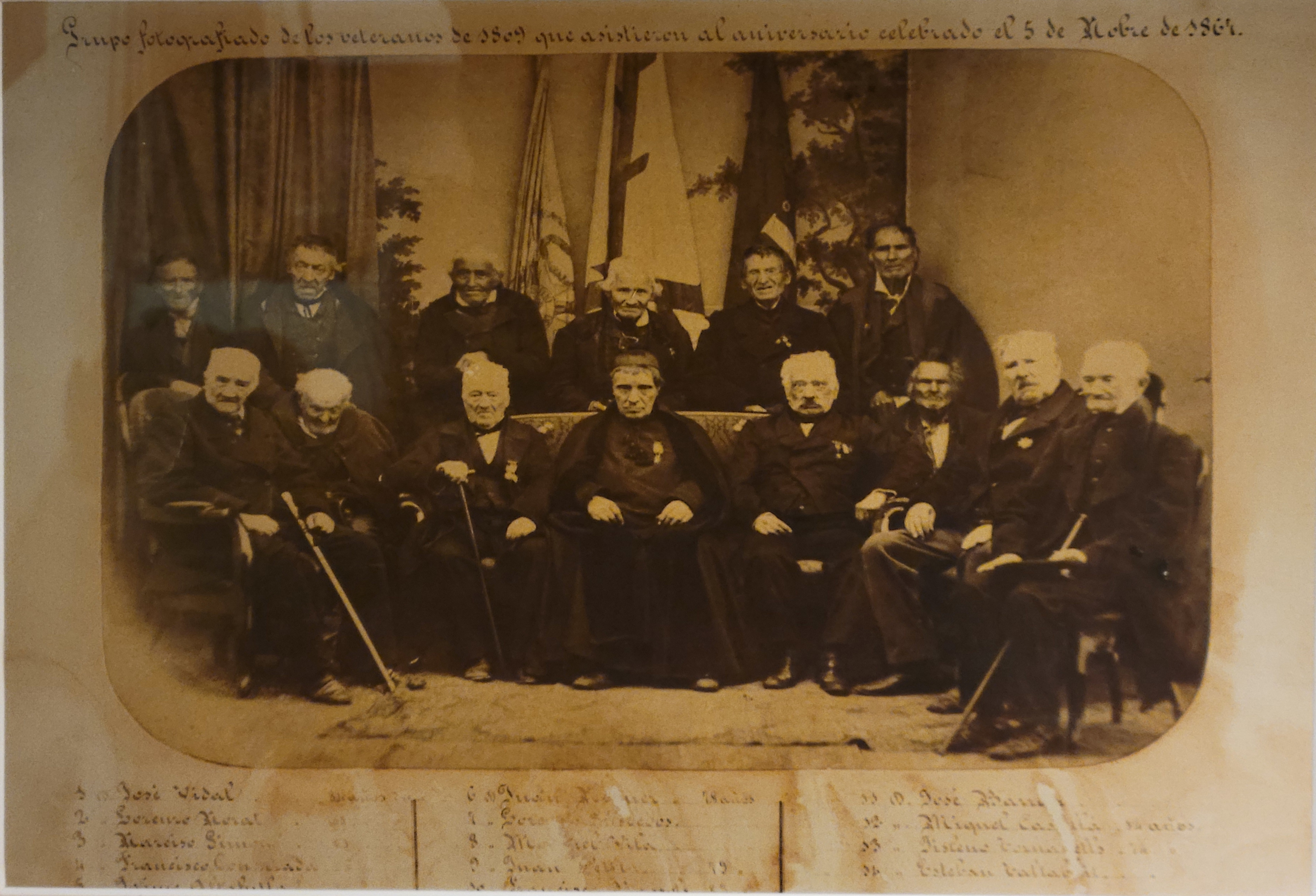
Veterans of the 1808-1809 sieges of Girona. Photograph dated 5 November 1864.

In spite of Álvarez's poor health, the French imprisoned him and the other officers from Girona at Perpignan, France on 23 December. After a month, he was taken to stand trial for treason at the Sant Ferran Castle in Figueres. On 21 January 1810, the day after his arrival at the castle, Álvarez was found dead in his cell.

Owing to the long delays and heavy losses suffered by the French, the town's resistance served Spanish purposes, however. The siege had pinned down the French army for an entire campaigning season. The battle became legendary over the course of Spain's War of Independence, rallying national resistance, and Álvarez became a national hero.

== In popular culture ==
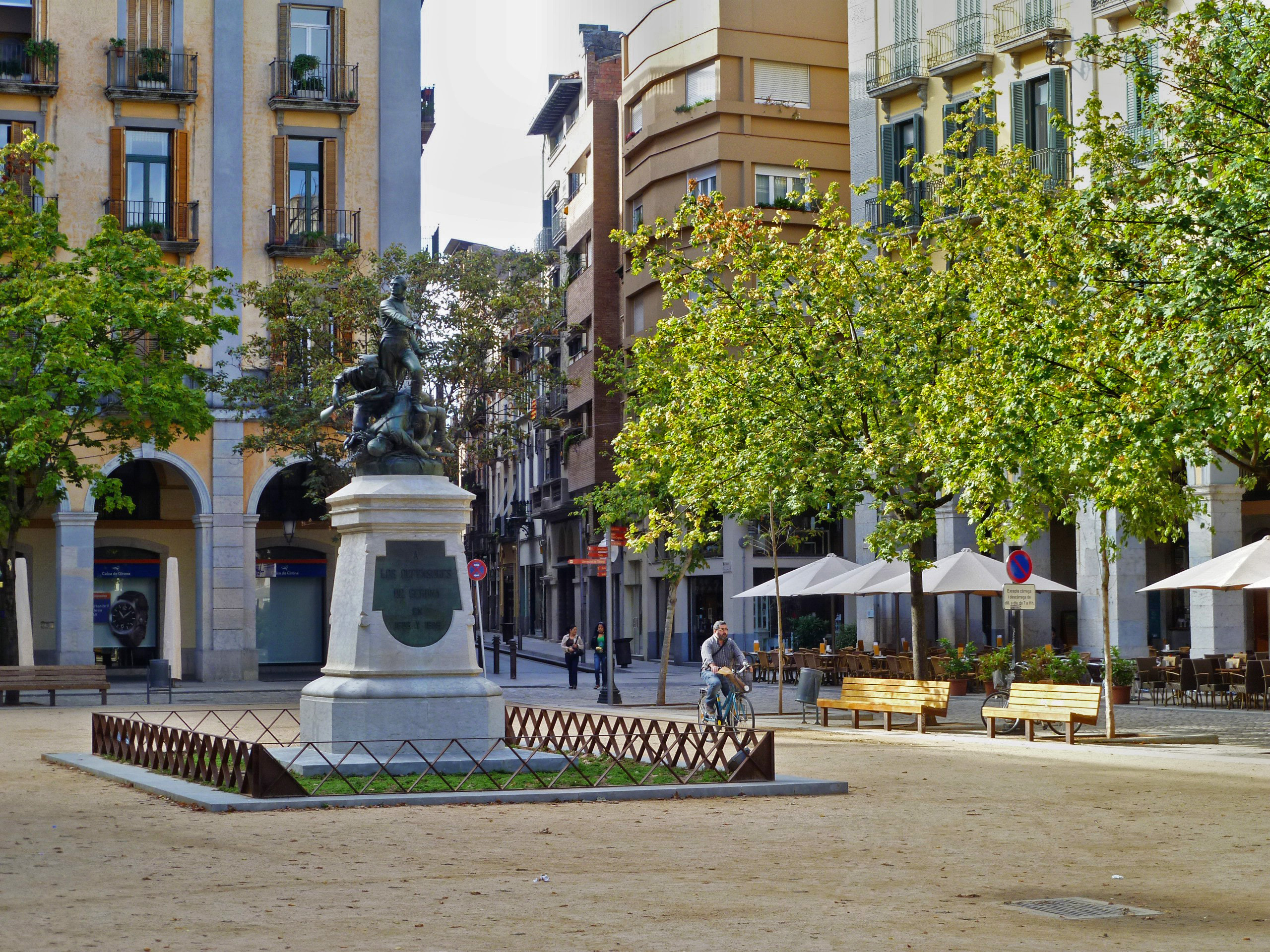
Independence Square, Girona

The success of the Spanish in repelling the 19 September attack was commemorated in 1864 by a painting by Ramón Martí Alsina entitled The Great Day of Girona. Roughly 5m by 11m in size, this large painting is the property of the Catalan National Art Museum. On 14 September 2010 it was put on permanent display in an auditorium of the government of Catalonia in Girona.

In Girona today, the Plaça de la Independència, is a town square that honors the defenders of the city during this war. A monument at the center of the square is dedicated to these defenders. Located in the Mercadal district, it is one of the best known and busiest places in town.

== See also ==
- A History of the Peninsular War
- Battle of Girona (1808)
- Second siege of Girona (1808)

== Notes ==
Preceded by Battle of Ebelsberg	Napoleonic Wars; Third siege of Girona	Succeeded by Battle of Piave River (1809)
