= Montjuïc (Girona) =

Hill of the ancient Catalan city of Girona, Spain

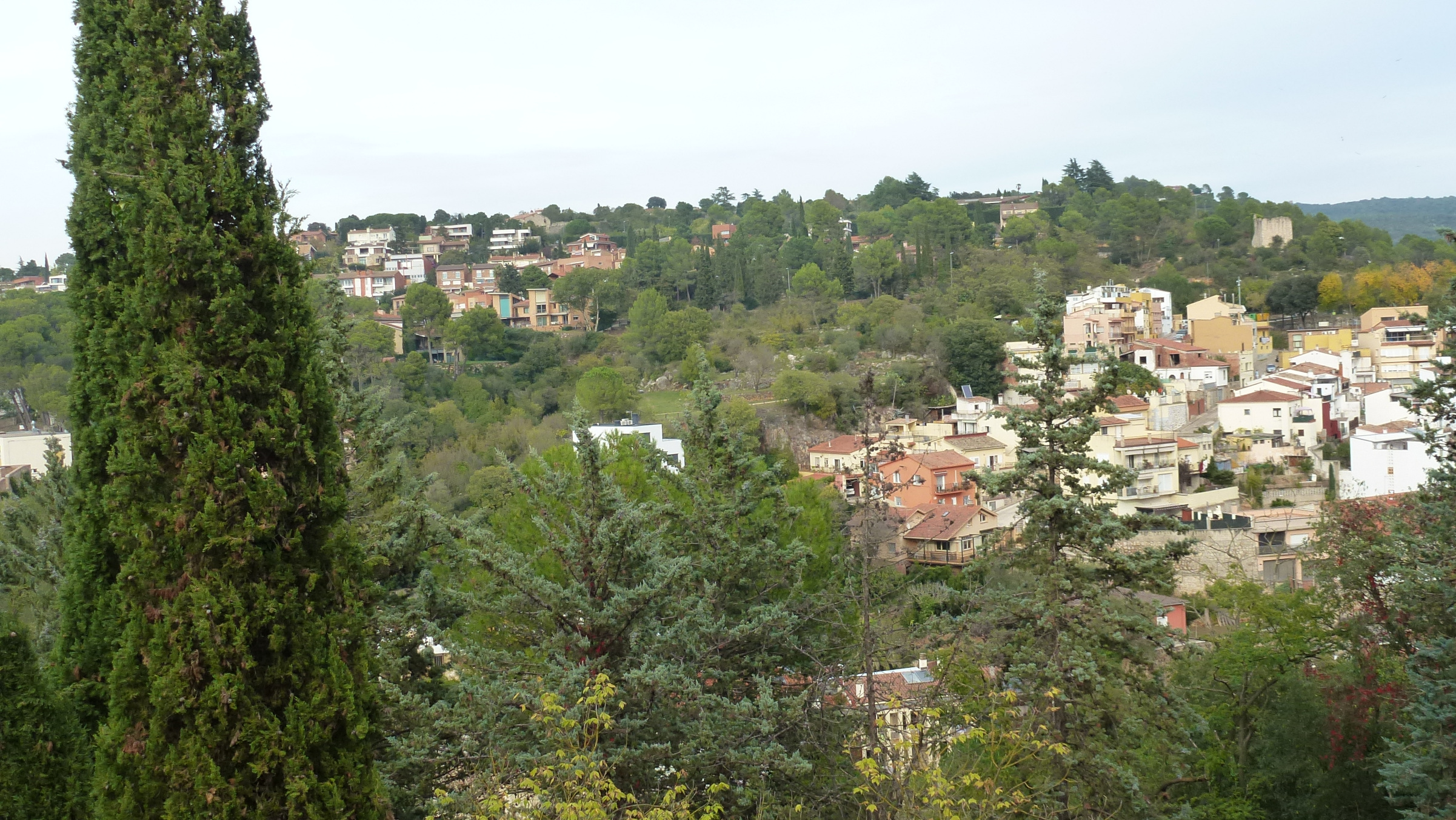
- The neighborhood of Montjuic in 2019 as viewed from Girona Cathedral. The Suchet Tower (1812) is at upper right, while Montjuic Castle (1653) is mostly hidden by trees and residential buildings

Highest point
- Coordinates: 41°59′37″N 2°49′54″E

Geography
- Location within Catalonia

Montjuïc is a hill of the ancient Catalan city of Girona, Spain. Montjuïc is located just to the north of the old quarter of the city, near the confluence of the Onyar, Galligants, and Ter rivers. Montjuïc is also the name of the present-day neighborhood and district of Girona on the hill. The name "Montjuïc" translates from medieval Catalan as "mountain of the Jews". The hill has an altitude of 219 m.

For much of Girona's history, Montjuïc was uninhabited, the site of only the medieval Jewish cemetery of the city and the 17th century Montjuïc Castle defensive bastion. Girona's Montjuïc parallels the better-known Montjuïc in Barcelona: a large hill adjacent to the city with a large castle fortress at the top dating to the mid-17th century and a medieval Jewish cemetery.

== Jewish Cemetery ==
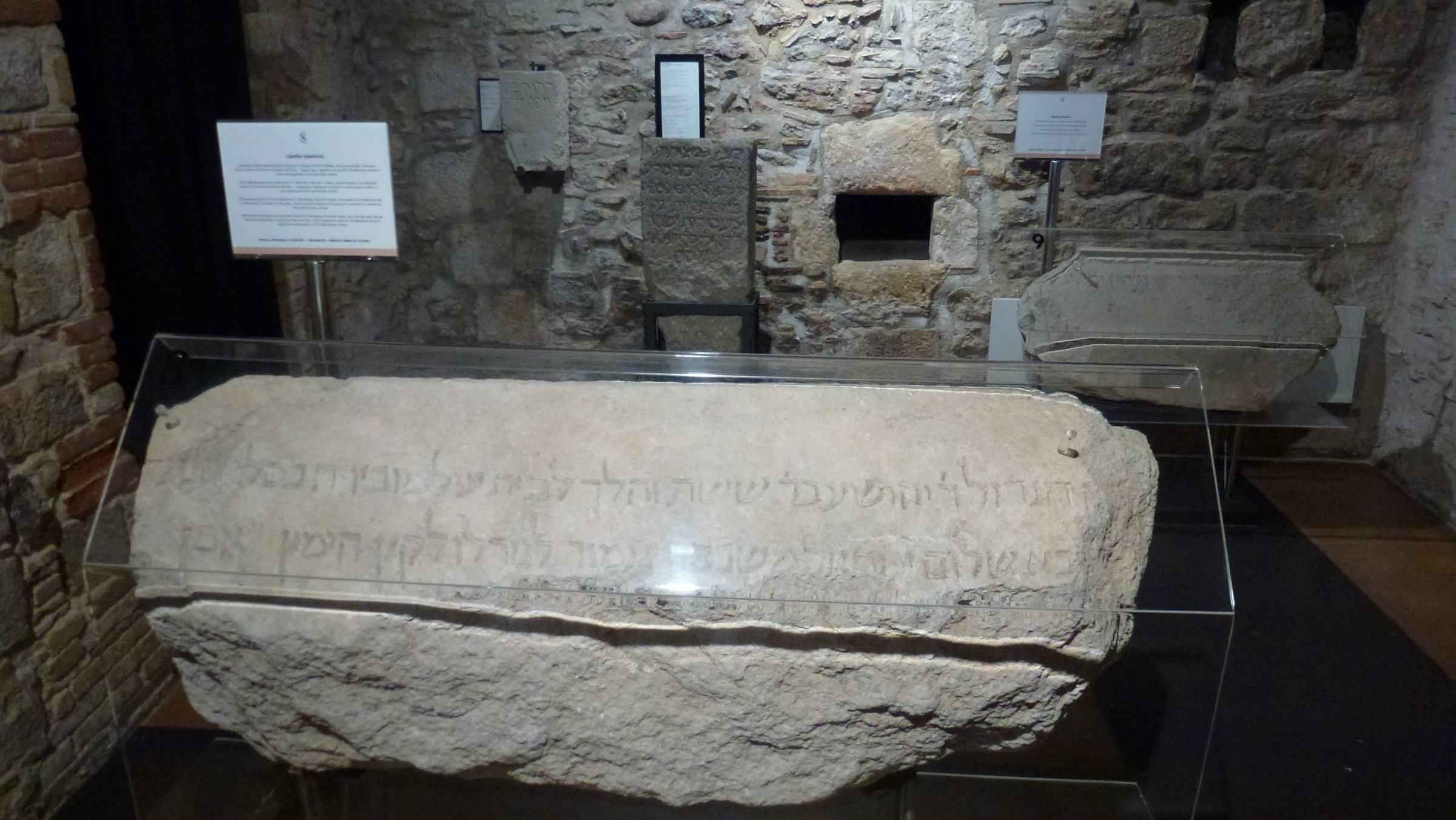
Gravestones originating from the cemetery of Montjuic, Girona, now at the Museum of Jewish History in Girona. The stone in the foreground dates to the 8th or 9th century.

The Jewish community of Girona was flourishing by the 12th century, with one of the most important Kabbalistic schools in Europe. Because Jews could not be buried in Christian cemeteries, the authorities of medieval Girona created a special place for Jewish burials outside the city, but close to the city walls. The Jewish cemetery was on the western slope of Montjuïc, and it existed as property of the Spanish crown. The earliest documentation of the cemetery occurs about the year 1200. From the Jewish Call of Girona, funeral processions would travel to the graveyard along a particular route.

In 1492 all Jews were expelled from Spain by the Alhambra Decree. On July 14, 1492, the Jewish community gave the 400-year-old cemetery to the nobleman Joan de Sarriera, in gratitude for many favors he had done for them. In ensuing years, the gravestones of the cemetery, often large, shaped slabs of rock bearing a Hebrew inscription, were taken and used in construction projects around Girona. Some of these gravestones were recovered in the modern era and can be seen in the Museum of Jewish History in Girona.

The cemetery was forgotten until 1862, when the railway line from Barcelona to France reached Girona. The railway path passed between the river Ter and the base of the west slope of Montjuïc, and the cemetery was discovered when the railway construction unearthed 20 tombstones with Hebrew inscriptions. The cemetery suffered further destruction in the 1960s. At the present time there are no obvious indications that the Jewish cemetery existed at the site.

The cemetery is bounded to the north and south by two minor Montjuïc creeks. The southern creek is called Bou d'Or. This location is just to the east of the Pont Major neighborhood and the railroad line, and to the northwest of the Montjuïc neighborhood.

== Montjuïc Castle ==
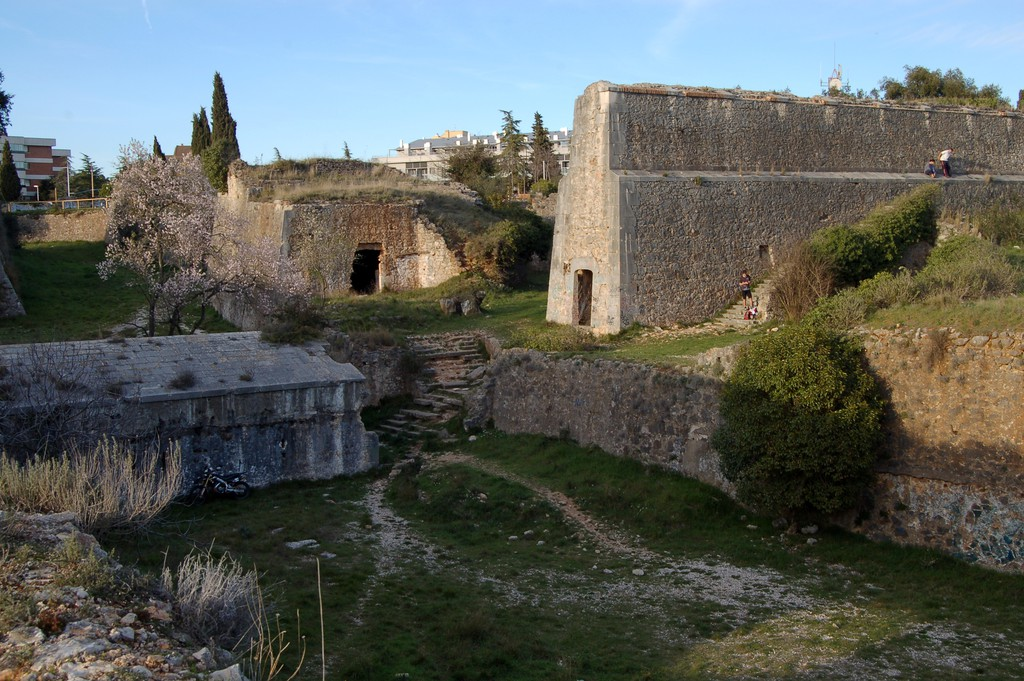
The ruins of Montjuic Castle.

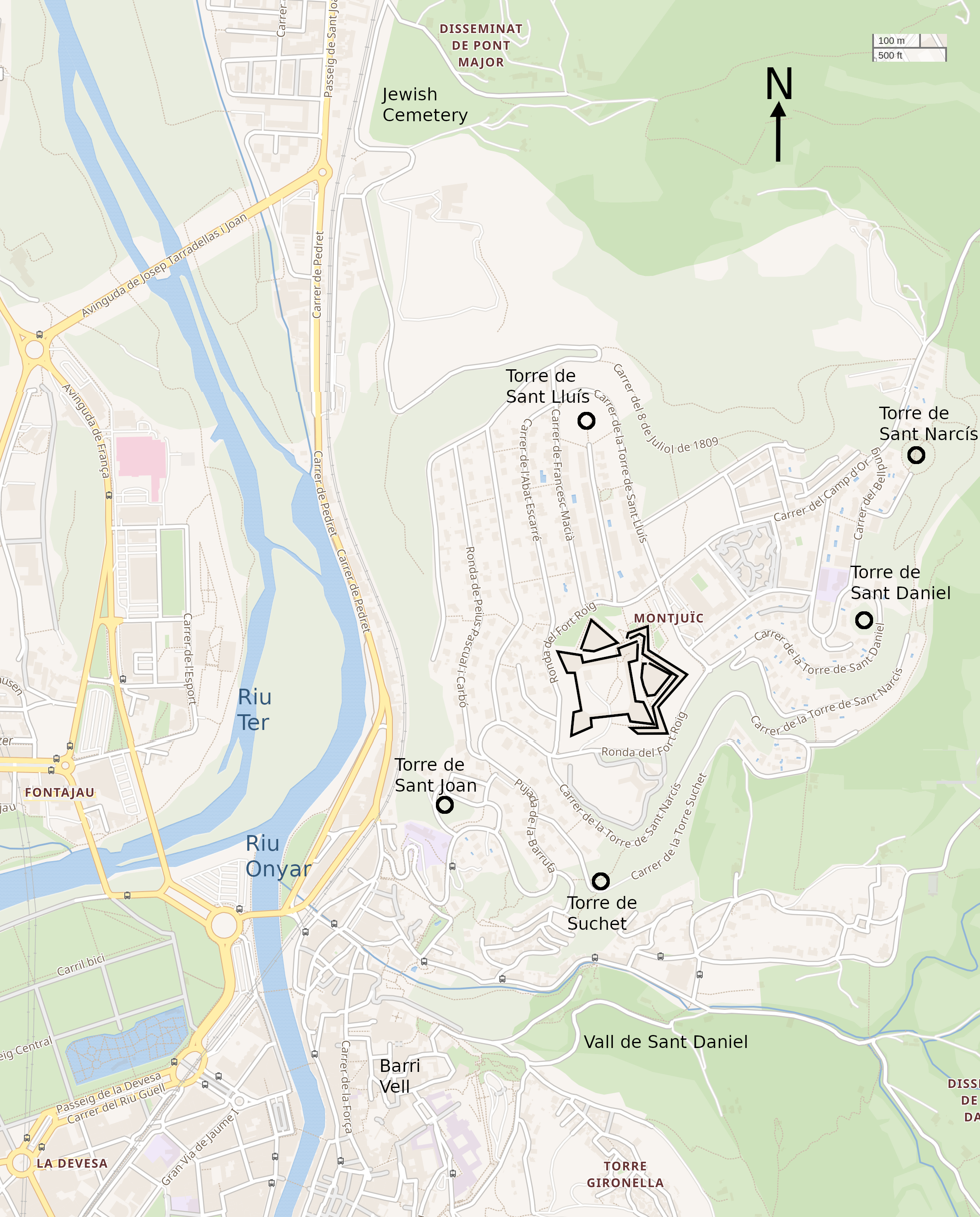
Montjuïc lies to the north of Barri Vell, the old quarter of Girona. The Montjuïc neighborhood surrounds the Castle, with its five outlying towers. The ancient, abandoned Jewish cemetery was located to north, beside the river Ter.

Montjuïc Castle, located at the top of Montjuïc, was built by order of Philip IV of Spain in the seventeenth and eighteenth centuries to protect the city of Girona. Construction of the castle began in 1653, consisting of a central fortification and four outlying defensive towers at about 500 m distance. The towers were named Sant Joan, Sant Daniel, Sant Narcís, and Sant Luís. The general plan of the central fortification is square, encompassed by four corner bastions. The walls between the bastions are about 150 meters in length. An additional outlying defensive tower was built in 1812, named after its builder the French Marshal Louis-Gabriel Suchet.

Montjuïc castle was used extensively in the Peninsular War (Spanish War of Independence) between Spain and France, 1808-1814. In particular, the castle was destroyed and fell to the French in August 1809 during the 7-month long Third siege of Girona. By order of Suchet, the castle was abandoned at the end of the war in 1814. In 1843, during the Catalan popular revolt "Jamància", Montjuïc Castle and the Suchet tower were destroyed by artillery on the orders General Juan Prim.

== Montjuïc in the 20th century ==
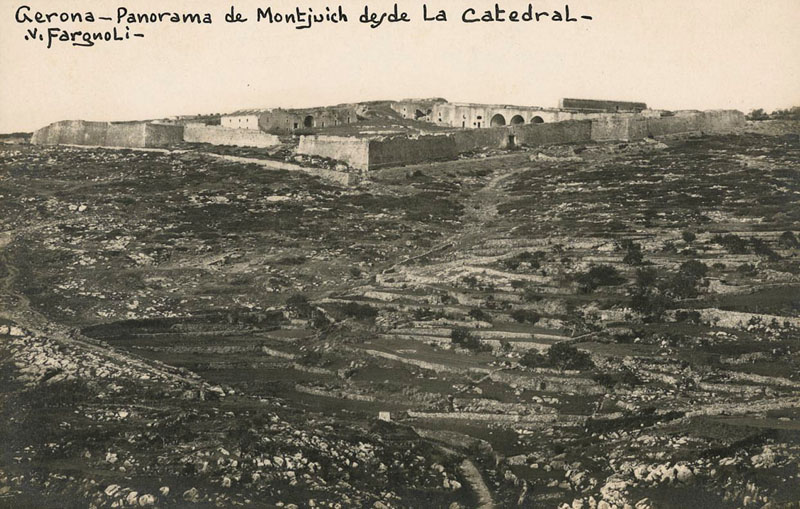
Montjuïc and its Castle in 1911 as viewed from Girona Cathedral. Compare with the similar photo above obtained in 2019.

The area around the fortress was undeveloped at the start of the 20th century. In the 1930s the City Council of Girona planned the first urbanization of the mountain, with a school and a city-garden for the working class. Planning was interrupted by the Spanish Civil War (1936-1939), however. Under the Franco city councils, the project was abandoned. Although the mountain was declared a green zone in 1955, the Girona city council could not obtain the transfer of land from the castle, which was military property.

Between 1950 and 1970 immigrants from elsewhere in Spain, mainly Andalusia and Extremadura, moved to Girona searching for better employment opportunities. Many built their own houses around the Castle forming a shanty town. By the late 1960s nearly 3000 immigrants had settled on the hill.

In 1966 Ferran de Vilallonga bought the land and prepared a definitive urbanization. Between 1967 and 1971 the squatters were pushed out to other neighborhoods of Girona, and a suburb was built for middle- to upper-class residents on Montjuïc. Residential buildings ultimately covered the entire mountain, surrounding the ruins of the castle. In 1986 the population of Montjuïc was 1381 inhabitants.
