= The Battle of Somosierra =

Painting by Horace Vernet

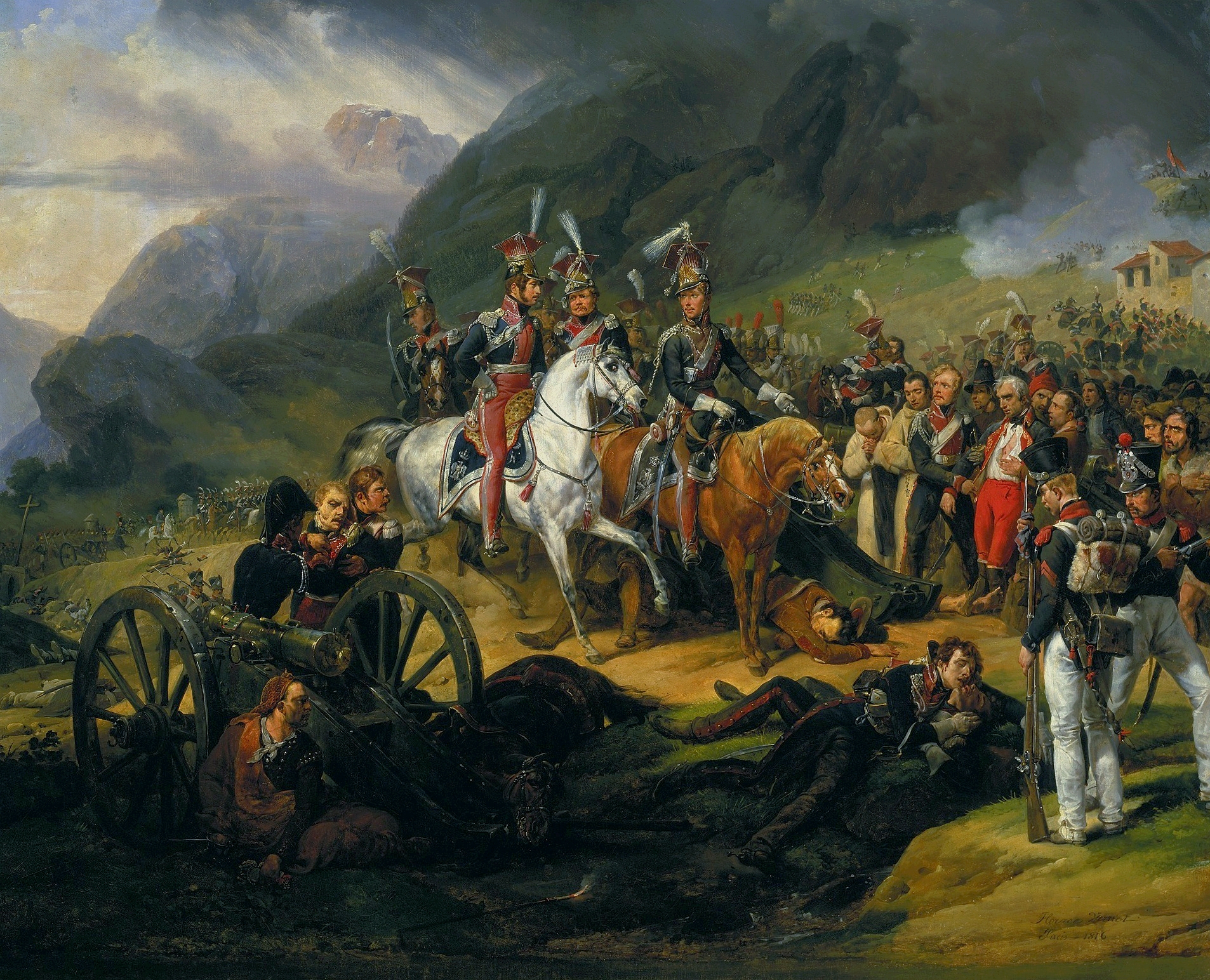
- Artist: Horace Vernet
- Year: 1816
- Medium: Oil on canvas
- Dimensions: 81 cm × 99 cm (32 in × 39 in)
- Location: National Museum, Warsaw

The Battle of Somosierra is an 1816 history painting by the French artist Horace Vernet. It depicts the Battle of Somosierra fought on 30 November 1808 during the Peninsular War. The action saw the clearing of the last remnants of the Spanish Army defending Madrid from the Somosierra Pass, allowing the French Emperor Napoleon to advance and occupy the capital. This was accomplished by a charge of Polish light cavalry, ordered by Napoleon in the face of heavy fire, which led to the Poles being almost entirely wiped out with heavy casualties. Vernet shows the scene just after the charge with the bodies of soldiers and horses scattered across the battlefield, with the survivors in the foreground. In the distance on the left, Napoleon is shown riding away towards Madrid past the corpses that litter the ground.

The work was commissioned by Wincenty Krasiński. The painting was displayed at the Salon of 1817 at the Louvre in Paris, where it drew large crowds because of its legendary subject matter. Although since the Bourbon Restoration depictions of Napoleon were suppressed, the painting was allowed to appear at the Salon, This was likely because of its stark depiction of the losses suffered during the Napoleonic Wars, a theme of Bourbon Dynasty's propaganda, and its negative view of the Emperor riding away indifferent to the carnage. Today it is in the collection of the National Museum in Warsaw.

== Bibliography ==
- Hornstein, Katie. Picturing War in France, 1792–1856. Yale University Press, 2018.
- Morawińska, Agnieszka. Romanticism. Dom Polski, 1999.
