= Siege of Girona (1710–1711) =

Conflict part of the War of the Spanish Succession

- Part of War of the Spanish Succession
- Map of the fortifications of Girona at the start of the siege on 16 December, printed at Amsterdam in 1735
| Date | December 1710 – 25 January 1711 |
| Location | Girona |
| Result | French victory |

Belligerents
| France; Bourbon Spain | Habsburg Spain |

Commanders and leaders
| Adrien Maurice de Noailles | Georg Ignaz von Tattenbach |

Strength
| 19,000 | |

During the War of the Spanish Succession, the city of Girona was besieged by French troops allied with Bourbon Spain from 15 December 1710 until 25 January 1711, when its Habsburg defenders surrendered.

The attacking Franco-Spanish army numbered some 19,000 and was commanded by Duke Adrien Maurice de Noailles. The city was well provisioned and hard to approach for artillery. It was defended by Count Georg Ignaz von Tattenbach.

As Noailles began his march in the winter, the weather was harsh. Fort Rouge was undermined and abandoned, but flooding made the French artillery positions untenable for a time. They were reestablished on 14 January and had breached the walls by 23 January, when an assault party took up positions to enter the city. Tattenbach asked for terms the following day. The defenders were given the honours of war.

Two Latin poems in praise of Noailles were written in response to the taking of Girona. Pierre D'Orival compared the duke's success to that of his father, Duke Anne Jules, at the siege of Girona in 1694. In his poem De Gerunda ab illustrissimo Duce Noallio expugnata ("The Storming of Girona by the Most Illustrious Duke of Noailles"), Thomas Maria des Antons singles out for praise the duke's tactical decision to strike in winter.

== Bibliography ==
- Coroleu, Alejandro (2024). Latin Political Propaganda in the War of the Spanish Succession and Its Aftermath, 1700–1740. Bloomsbury.
- Falkner, James (2015). The War of the Spanish Succession, 1701–1714. Pen and Sword Military.
