= Yefim Chaplits =

Polish-Russian nobleman and military officer

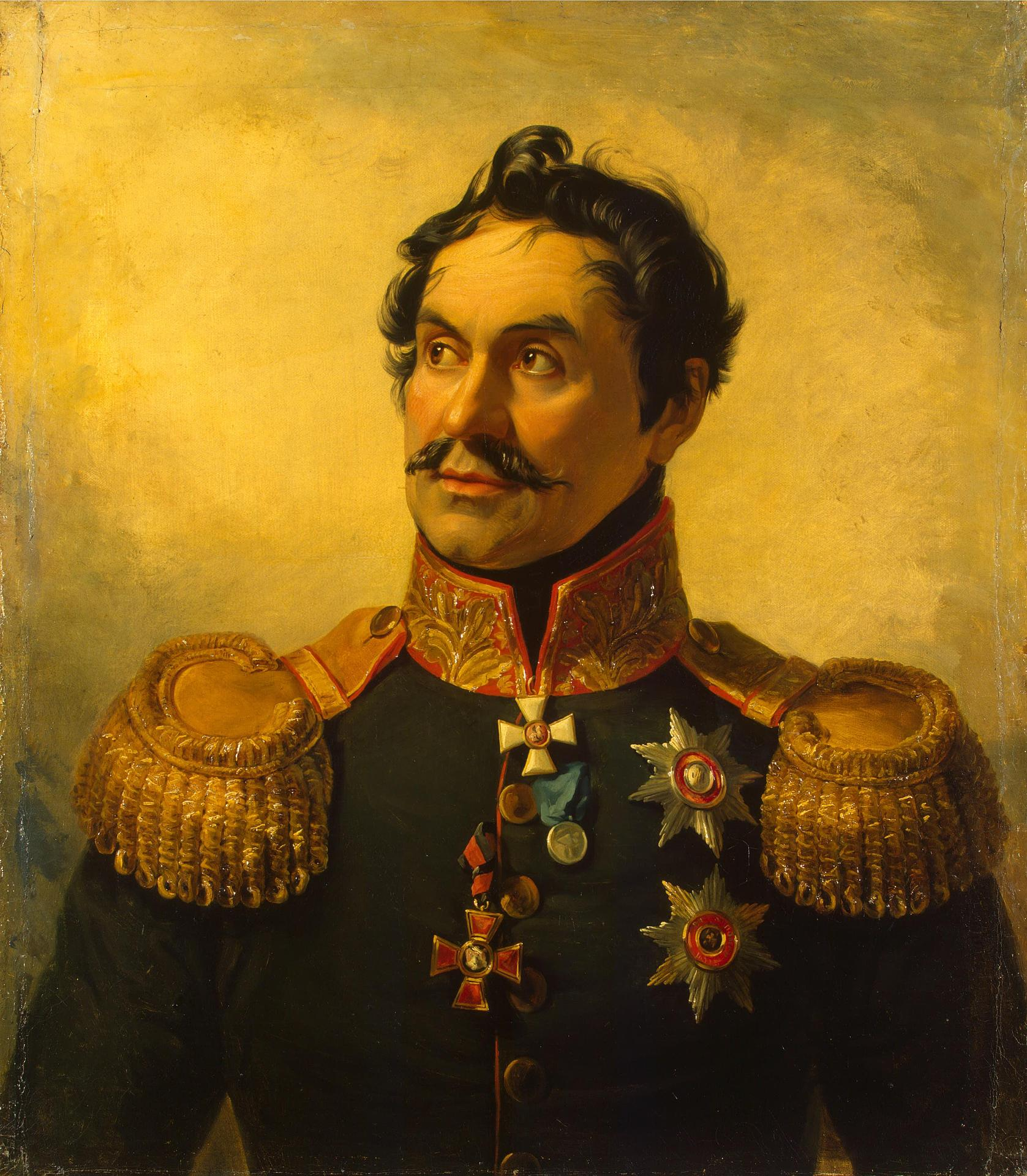
Portrait by George Dawe

Yefim Ignatyevich Chaplits/Tschaplitz (Russian: Ефим Игнатьевич Чаплиц; 1768–1825), born Eufemiusz Czaplic, was a Polish military commander in the service of the Russian Empire.

== Life ==
Eufemiusz Czaplic was born into an old Polish noble family Czaplic (Kierdeja coat of arms) and began military service in the Polish army, but entered Russian service with a rank of second major on 26 October 1783. During the Russo-Turkish War of 1787–92, he served on the staff of Prince Potemkin and took part in the battles of Ochakov, Bendery and Akkerman. He received the Order of St. Vladimir of 4th degree with bow for the capture of Izmail, where he commanded the chasseurs.

In 1792 he became Lieutenant Colonel and was transferred to the Smolensk Dragoon Regiment of General Mikhail Kakhovsky. During the Kościuszko's Uprising of 1794 Czaplic was sent by Baron Igelström to carry out peace negotiations with the Poles, but was wounded and captured at Warsaw. He was soon released and participated in the Persian Campaign of 1796, where he commanded Grebensk and Semeiny Cossack regiments. His regiments captured Derbent and Baku, for which Czaplic was promoted to the rank of Colonel on 13 June 1796. Upon his accession to the throne, Emperor Paul I recalled the army back to Russia and had Czaplic dismissed from the military on 27 February 1798. However, on 27 March 1801, the fourth day after his assumption of the throne, Emperor Alexander I returned Czaplic to service with the rank of Major General and on 11 November 1803 appointed him to the Imperial Retinue.

During the 1805 Campaign he commanded the vanguard of Prince Pyotr Bagration Corps and participated in actions at Lambach, Amstetten (receiving the Order of St. George of 3rd degree, 24 January 1806) and Schöngrabern. After the Battle of Austerlitz he protected the retreat of the Russian Army. He became chief of the Pavlograd Hussar Regiment on 23 July 1806, and commander of the cavalry brigade on 23 October 1806. Czaplic participated in the Prussian campaign and distinguished himself at the Golymin, Allenstein, and served as commandant of Königsberg for two weeks.

From October 1809 to July 1810 Czaplic commanded the 7th Division, and in November 1810, took command of the Reserve Cavalry Corps. He led the 4th Cavalry Division from February to March 1811 and in May 1811 the 8th Cavalry Division. He was appointed commander of the 3rd Reserve Cavalry Corps of the 2nd Reserve Army of Observation on 7 April 1812. He defeated Saxon troops at Kobryn and Slonim and took into captivity one General, 66 officers and 2300 soldiers with 4 standard and 8 cannon. For that and other engagements, in September 1812 he was appointed commander of the infantry corps of the 3rd Army and acted against Lithuanian Guards of general Konopka, defeating him at the Battle of Slonim with a light cavalry party.

On 12 November 1812 he was promoted to lieutenant general and led the advance-guard of Admiral Pavel Chichagov's army to the Berezina River, and fought the French at Borisov on 26 November 1812, where he was lightly wounded in the head. He captured Vilna on 28 November 1812.

In 1813, Czaplic served at Toruń, was given command of cavalry of the army of Poland, and fought at the Leipzig. In 1814, he participated in the siege of Hamburg and assumed command of the 3rd Corps of the Army of Poland on 18 April 1814. In 1817, Czaplic rose to command the 3rd Hussar Division. He was relieved of command on 27 February 1823. During his career, he also received the Prussian Order of the Red Eagle, the French Order of Légion d'honneur, the Russian Order of Alexander Nevsky, the Order of St. Anna of 1st degree with diamonds, the Order of St. Vladimir of 2nd degree and a golden sword with diamonds.
