= Siege of Warsaw =

Siege of Warsaw may refer to:

- Siege of Warsaw (1656), by Swedish forces during the Deluge
- Capture of Warsaw (1657), by Transylvanian, Swedish, Cossack and Moldavian forces during the Deluge
- Siege of Warsaw (1794), by Russian and Prussian forces during the Kościuszko Uprising
- Battle of Praga (1794), by Russian forces during the Kościuszko Uprising
- Battle of Raszyn (1809), by Austrian forces during the Austro-Polish War
- Battle of Warsaw (1831), by Russian forces during the November Uprising
- Siege of Warsaw (1939), by German forces during the Invasion of Poland

== See also ==
- Battle of Warsaw (disambiguation)
