= Ambroży Mikołaj Skarżyński =

Polish general; Napoleonic officer

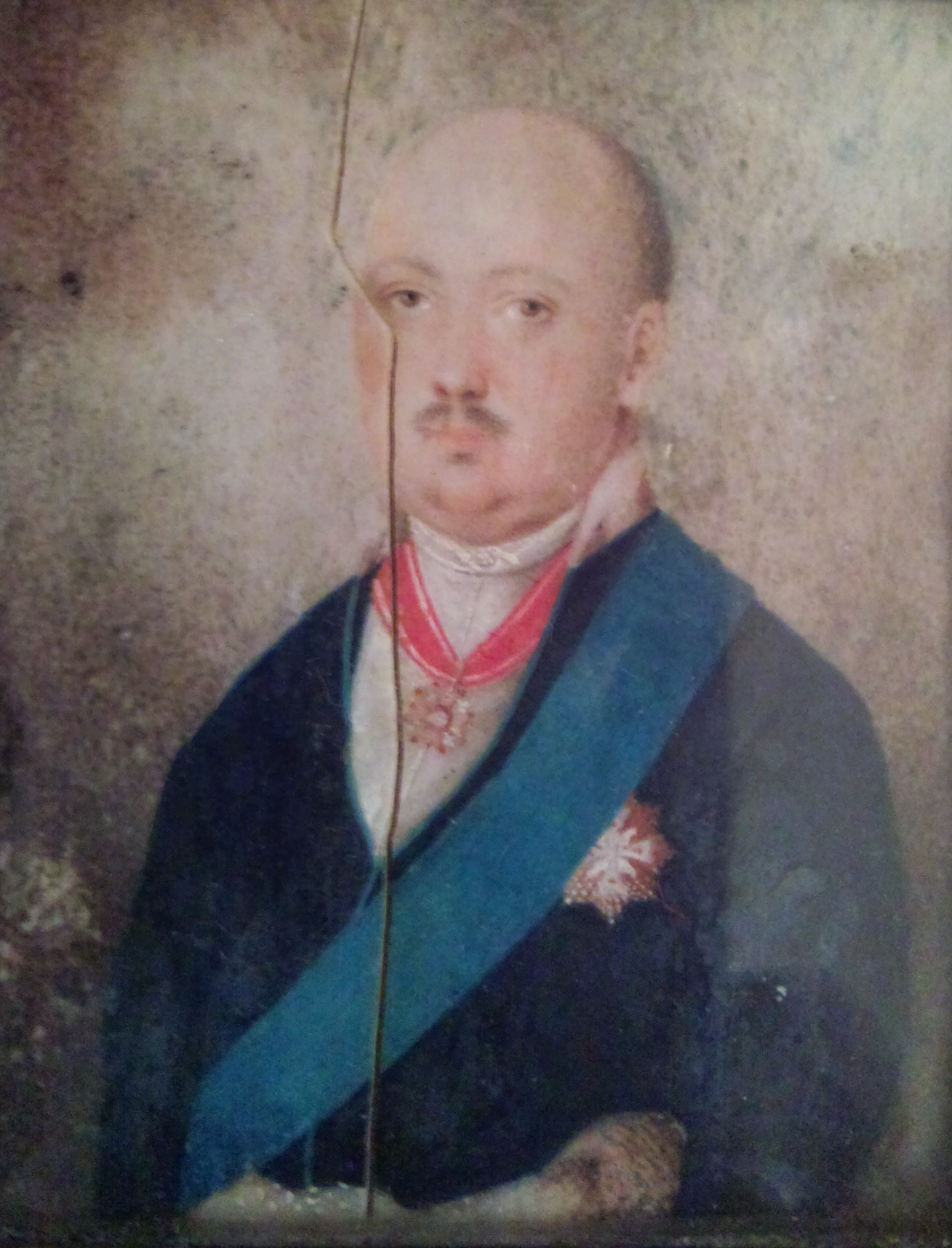
Skarżyński - portrait

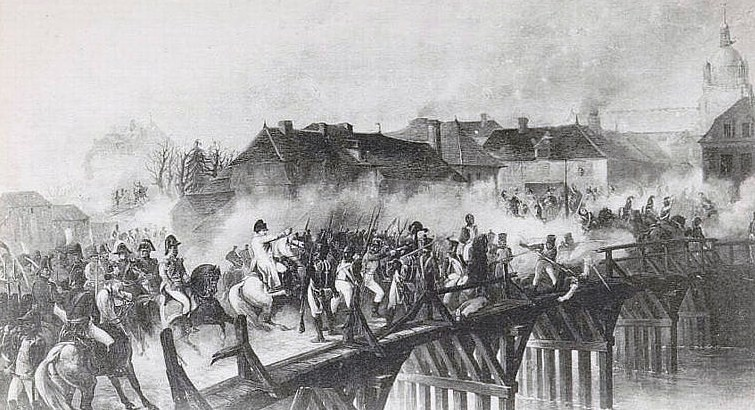
Battle of Arcis-sur-Aube.

Bończa, Ambrozy's Coat of Arms.

French Imperial Coat of Arms. General Ambroży Mikołaj Skarżyński would be awarded with the title of Baron and Chevalier de l'Empire by Napoleon Bonaparte

Baron Ambroży Mikołaj Skarżyński of Bończa (1787–1868) was a Napoleonic officer, Chevalier de l'Empire and later in his career he would become a Polish general. He was born in Gawłów, Masovian Voivodeship, Poland. He began his career in the Prussian army. He was educated at a Prussian military school. A Cadet in the Prussian 13th Dragoon Regiment. He would become a military officer under Napoleon Bonaparte and his First French Empire. He eventually served in the Imperial Guard. He would be awarded with the title of Chevalier de l'Empire for his battlefield accomplishments. He distinguished himself at the Battle of Berry-au-Bac, the Battle of Arcis-sur-Aube and the Battle of Wagram. He received a hereditary title of a Baron of the French Empire in 1814, which was later confirmed by the Polish parliament in 1820.

== Biography ==
Ambrozy was born into a Polish aristocratic family; his father was a wealthy landowner, a castellan and a chairman of the Polish Court of Appeal and his mother Bibiana née Lanckoronska - came from one of the oldest Polish households. Ambrozy, along with his 3 other brothers, was educated initially by Monsieur Borne, a French expatriate living in Warsaw and later at a Prussian dragoon academy.

Ambrozy is best remembered for his military achievements while serving in the French Grande Armée. He was an officer in the Polish 1st Light Cavalry Regiment of the Imperial Guard and he led the defense of Napoleon himself during the battle of Arcis-sur-Aube. He also took part in the battles of Wagram, Somosierra and Berry-au-Bac. For his bravery at Wagram he was awarded with a title of Chevalier de l'Empire in 1811 and a hereditary rent amounting to 500 francs a year and for his achievements at Berry-au-Bac he received a hereditary title of a Baron of the French Empire in 1814, which was later confirmed by the Polish parliament in 1820. He was awarded the Knight's Cross of the Legion of Honor. Promoted to captain 17 February 1811. In August 1812, during the Russian campaign, he moved to the 3rd Lithuanian Cavalry Regiment, which was being formed at that time, and was promoted to the head of the squadron on 11 August 1812. In the battle of Slonim, the units of this regiment fell into a Russian ambush, from which only Ambroży Skarżyński's squadron survived. After this defeat, the regiment was not reconstituted, and the remnants were incorporated into the 1st Light Cavalry. Participation in the War of the Sixth Coalition (battle of Weimar, battle of Hanau, battle of Dresden, and the battle of Leipzig). On 28 November 1813 he received the Officer's Cross of the Legion of Honour and in 1814 the Order of the Reunion. In the Six Days' Campaign, he took part in the battles of Montmirail, Château-Thierry, Champaubert, Montereau, Reims, Berry-au-Bac, Arcis-sur-Aube, and Saint-Dizier. At the Battle of Berry-au-Bac (5 March 1814), a squadron commanded by Skarżyński captured the bridge leading to the capture of the Russian troops, which opened the way for the French army. In the battle of Arcis-sur-Aube, Skarżyński's squadron protected Napoleon from the attack of enemy cavalry. On 31 March 1814, while performing his last mission, at the head of the squadron of the 3rd Eclair Regiment, Capt. Skarżyński arrived, escorted by Emperor Napoleon, to the palace in Fontainebleau, where he signed his abdication.

Skarzysnki resigned from the Napoleonic army in 1814, but returned to military service in 1830, when he joined a Uhlans regiment in the November Uprising in Poland. In 1831 he was elevated to the rank of a General of the Polish Military and was awarded the highest Polish military order, Virtuti Militari for his courage during the battles of Wawer and Grochow. After the failure of the uprising in the late 1831 Ambrozy emigrated from the Duchy of Warsaw to Prussia, where he stayed until 1857. He then returned to the Duchy to settle in his estate, Orłów, where he died in 1868.

In 1818 Ambrozy married Julia Sokolowska, daughter of the starosta of Nieszawa and he received Orłów estate as a dowry, which included a vast amount of land and a large manor. He also received Suserz estate with a wooden manor from his father, Jerzy. Skarzynski had 7 children with Julia, and their son, also called Jerzy, participated later in the Greater Poland Uprising (1848). Children of Ambroży and Julia née Sokołowska: 1. Jerzy, 2. Magdalena, 3. Kazimierz, 4. Eleonora, 5. Bibianna, 6. Konstanty, 7. Franciszek, 8. Stanisław, 9. Maksymilian Józef.

== See also ==
- Uhlans
- Polish 1st Light Cavalry Regiment of the Imperial Guard
- November Uprising
- Skarzynski
