= Battle of Los Yébenes =

1809 Battle of the Peninsular War

- Part of Peninsular War
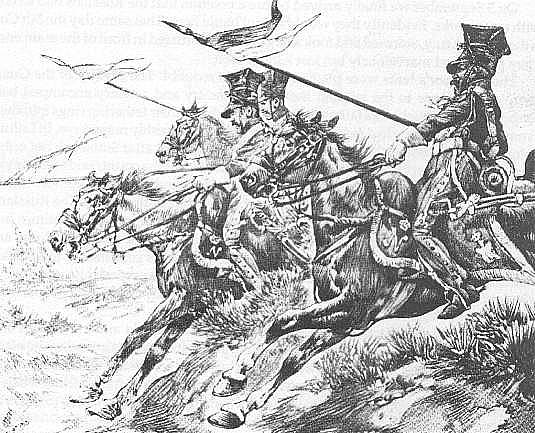
- Polish Vistula Lancers in charge
Date	24 March 1809
Location	Los Yébenes 39°34′N 3°53′W
Result	Spanish victory

Belligerents
Duchy of Warsaw	Spain

Commanders and leaders
Jan Konopka	José y Urbina, Count of Cartaojal

Strength
590	5,000

Casualties and losses
89 killed or captured	Unknown

Peninsular War: Castile & Andalusia
current battle

The Battle of Los Yébenes (24 March 1809) was a conflict between the Regiment of Polish Lancers (Legion of the Vistula) and multiple regiments of Spanish cavalry, near the Spanish village of Los Yébenes (today, a municipality). The heavily outnumbered Polish regiment, led by Colonel Jan Konopka, was surprised and nearly defeated by the larger Spanish force.

== Background ==
General Valence's Polish Division, (Note: It consisted of two infantry regiments of the Legion of the Vistula) belonging to General Horace Sébastiani's IV Corps, left Toledo on March 20, 1809, and marched south-west in order to take Andalusia. On the evening of March 23, they stopped to rest in the town of Mora.

The Lancers (591 men in four squadrons) could have spent the night in nearby Orgaz at the foot of the mountains, but Colonel Konopka chose the village of Los Yébenes (also called Yevenes or Ivenes), which the Poles had recognized as a comfortable place to rest during previous patrols. However, the place was difficult to organize for defense. An eyewitness, Sergeant Kajetan Wojciechowski, wrote:

This position was extremely dangerous for cavalry, because the only way out of the valley zigzagged through the mountain, from which any step to the right, where sky-high rocks were hanging over our heads, or to the left, because of abyss under our feet, was impossible to make, and it was the only way we had take if attacked by the enemy.

As an outpost, the village could easily turn into a death trap for sleeping soldiers, with little room to organize for battle and no safe path to retreat. The valley itself was vast enough to fight a massive battle, but for a single regiment going up against a whole army, it was disadvantageous. According to Kirkor, the regiment came under attack by seven regiments of the Spanish cavalry and two batteries of horse artillery.

Colonel Konopka might have chosen such a place to spend the night because neither the French nor the Poles knew the Spanish forces were concentrated nearby. The regiment's companies were quartered throughout the village, along with the wagons of the supply column. The fifth company, under Captain Jan Szulc, stayed in the center of the village. The fifth company, on that night, was the service detachment of the regiment. Pickets were posted around the village.

== Battle ==
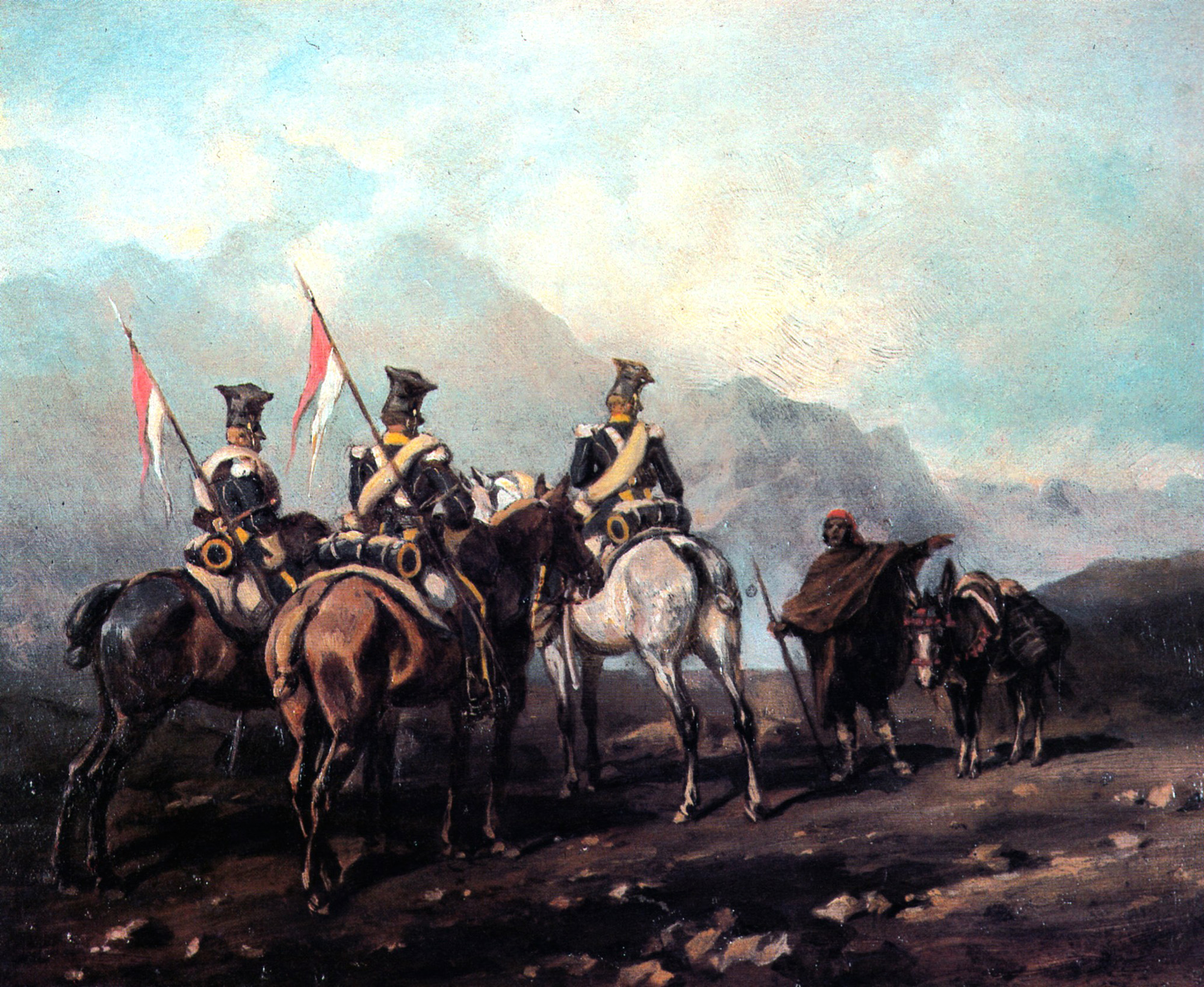
Lancers of the Vistula Legion on patrol in Spain

The night of March 24th was foggy. The sentries heard suspicious sounds and informed the colonel, "But he calmed all his officers, assuring them that the enemy was several days marching from here, near the Guadiana river." He was mistaken, since hidden by the fog was the new Army of La Mancha, commanded by Count de Cartaojal. At seven in the morning, he mounted an attack on the Lancers, who had just awoken. Although, according to the French Light Cavalry regulations, the reveille should have been called at six am.

Lancers of the fifth company engaged the enemy first, while the rest of the regiment was forming in disarrayed squadrons by the church in the center of the village. Suddenly, the fog lifted, and the Poles caught sight of dense ranks of Spanish cavalry, and two batteries of horse artillery as well. Colonel Konopka, realising the enemy's superior numbers, gave the only possible order: to retreat toward the main French force.

Squadrons turned around and—in the marching column— rushed toward Orgaz, with the Colonel and Major Andrzej Ruttie in front. The fifth company protected the rest of the column as the rearguard.

Soon the Lancers, led by Konopka, met two regiments of the Spanish cavalry. Konopka cried, "Forward, boys!" to the eighth company, who leveled their lances, attacking furiously. It was the Royal Carabineers Regiment (Spanish carabineros reales), a well-renowned regiment in the Spanish Army, that blocked the narrow road on the edge of a precipice, without any chance to go forward or back.

It was a merciless fight. Lancers, due to their reach, had a natural advantage against the Spanish carabineers, who were armed with swords. In the terrible melee, where only a few soldiers could fight back against the Poles, the carabineers, pressed between their attackers and the following Spanish regiment, had no chance. Some hurled themselves in despair into a stony river while others tried to climb the rocky slopes above. Those left on the road were killed by the Lancers.

The Lancers' attack completely surprised the Spanish soldiers, who moments before had been certain they would prevail. Now, seeing their front lines smashed by the enemy, they began to withdraw, and those in the rear started to retreat. The Lancers pressed on in their retreat, and soon forced their way to a wider part of the road. There, separated from the Spanish soldiers, they went into a gallop.

Colonel Konopka, along with Major Ruttie and a dozen lancers, left the regiment as they reached the open field and began to form defense lines to repulse the Spanish cavalry, which flowed out from the canyon. The Polish Colonel safely reached Mora, where General Valence's main forces had remained, convinced that the regiment was lost. The regiment, however, led by one of the squadrons' COs, Captain Telesfor Kostanecki, fought its way through the enemy's lines and, in a roundabout way —by Consuegra – arrived a few hours later in Mora.

When General Sebastiani approached with an infantry division and three regiments of Milhaud's dragoons, Cartaojal was forced to withdraw the Spanish troops to Ciudad Real.

== Aftermath ==
At the battle of Yébenes, the regiment of Polish Lancers suffered significant losses. Lieutenant Stanisław Moszyński (Molzinski) was killed. He died when dueling with Lieutenant Zawadzki Captains Jan Szulc and Kajetan Stokowski, as well as Lieutenant Stawierski and surgeon Jan Gryll, all wounded, were taken as prisoners (the retreat was so difficult that the regiment could not evacuate its wounded). Overall, between March 8 and April 15, the regiment was missing 89 men. 47 of these were taken prisoner. Subsequent losses of the regiments were negligible. As such, it is likely that the number of Lancers killed in the battle was 42.

The regiment also lost all of its wagons from the supply train and, along with them, all four squadrons' banners and gifts they had received from Napoleon's wife, Joséphine de Beauharnais when the regiment was still in Italy in 1802. The loss of the banners was especially humiliating for the Lancers. The Lancers' defeat became known all over Spain, and was their largest defeat by the Spanish forces during the Peninsular War. Afterwards, "los infernos picadores," (Eng: Lancers from Hell) would try at any cost to regain their former reputation among the ranks of the Armée d'Espagne.

The chance to avenge their honour came very soon. On March 27 1809, at the battle of Ciudad Real, the Lancers took the bridge, crushed four squares of Spanish infantry, and put them to flight. The next day, at the Battle of Santa Cruz de Mudela, the Lancers, without waiting for the rest of the Corps, defeated the same Spanish forces once again. On 18 September 1809, the mere presence of the Lancers from Hell during the Battle of Ocaña, led to the same carabiñeros reales regiment fleeing the battlefield.

At the beginning of May, Colonel Konopka left the regiment and traveled, summoned by the authorities, to France. He stayed for some time in Sedan, which was the seat of the recruiting squadron, and returned to the regiment after fifteen months. The real effect of losing the standards was official refusal to give new ones to the regiment, but as Wojciechowski writes about the battle, "There had ended our penance for the standards lost at Jovenes." On 18 June 1811, one regiment was stripped from the Vistula Legion and redesignated as the 7th Régiment de Chevaulégers-lanciers of the regular French army.

== Fate of the Lost Banners ==
Wojciechowski later wrote about the fate of the lost banners:

When I jumped off my mount, I took Kazaban to one side and asked him why our Colonel, always so brave and perspicacious in all the previous combats, had completely lost his head today, and was complaining to our General about how our regiment was lost. He did not understand these complaints, because he was sure that the whole regiment was out of danger. Kazaban took a deep breath, took my hand and said to me, 'You are probably right, and our regiment is out of danger, but nevertheless something worse has happened. We have lost the standard of our regiment, the emblem we received in Italy many years ago during the French revolution. The emblem that Napoleón wanted to change when he became Emperor and the regiment opposed, because it felt so strongly about it: this emblem was our four standards.'

'What the devil are you telling me?' I shouted. 'I am sure that we left them in the depot at Madrid!'

'Yes', he said, 'the covers and the poles have gone, but I put the standards with my own hands, in the greatest secrecy, in a saddlebag that was in the Colonel's wagon. That wagon was left on the other side of the big mountain and I am sure it has been captured by the Spaniards'.

I was stunned. I knew the consequences of this accident for the whole regiment. In this case our regiment would merely exist, and we Lancers, no matter how brave we might be, would be deprived of all reward or promotion.

The regiment lost its banners despite explicit orders, according to which they should have been kept in safety of the regimental depot behind the lines. As a result, the regiment was not included – despite the recommendation of Joachim Murat – in the Imperial Guard and never granted new banners.

In his report, the Spanish commanding officer, Count Cartaojal wrote on 29 March (it was published in Spanish papers on 1 April) about the losses of the Polish Lancers:

98 men, including prisoners of war and three officers, and also a banner, horses, lances and equipment.

In a later note to the Supreme Junta of Seville he added:

Two more banners of the Polish regiment were taken in Los Yebanes; we found [them] on an officer killed in the battle.

From his own words, it appears that Cartaojal took three of four regimental banners, and that two of these were in possession of a Lancer, who – knowing their worth – tried to save them, but was killed during the fight. The fourth banner was most likely burned with the wagon train.

What happened to the three banners between the end of the battle and the moment when two of them were hung as trophies in the Royal Chapel of Saint Francis Cathedral in Seville is unknown, but a few surviving documents offer some possibilities.

It was possible all three Lancer banners were in the possession of the general staff of the Spanish Army, who had no desire to present them in public until the Battle of Albuera. It is quite possible that the Spanish command decided to show the forgotten banners at this particular moment, to signify they were banners taken from the Vistula Lancers to heighten the morale of Spanish troops.

Potentially, this explains the discussion of "taking the Polish banners by the Regiment of Murcia", in General Lardizabal's report. The statement was false, as Spaniards did not take any standards or banners at Albuera. However, the note probably refers to the banners from Los Yébenes.

Seven days later, Sebastian Llano, aide-de-camp of the Spanish general Joaquín Blake, presented himself before the Cortes of Cádiz with a trophy – the banner of the Third squadron – and said: "... of the three standards taken from our enemies, I have the honour to present to Your Excellencies this one, as the homage to the Nation you represent". This banner was hung in the San Felipe Neri church in Cádiz, but it later disappeared without a trace.

In 1889, J. Gestoso of Seville published, in the series National Glory, a colour reprint of the banner of the First squadron, along with the information that it was kept in "the Royal Chapel of Saint Francis in this town", as the "memorabilia" of the Battle of Bailén. A year later the same author, in his Seville Guide, mentioned two Polish banners in the Royal Chapel, connecting them with Bailén again, unaware that Polish Lancers were not involved in that battle; moreover, all trophies taken during that battle by the Spaniards were recovered by King Joseph Bonaparte in 1810.

Today, in the cathedral of Seville, only the banner of the Second squadron remains, because the one which belonged to the First squadron was removed (in unclear circumstances) around 1910 to the Musée de l'Armée in Paris, where it is kept without mention that it was once a trophy of the Spanish forces.

Finally, there is also the fate of Colonel Konopka, who – against explicit orders – placed the regiment's banners in the wagons of the train. His travel to France (connected with the investigation into the case) was lengthy, but without any visible consequences for him. After the Battle of Albuera, he was supposedly nominated as a French General and Baron, and never returned to the Vistula Lancers. Formations of the light cavalry of the Vistula Legion were not formally Polish detachments.

Konopka later became the "instructor of the lance" in the 1st Polish Light Cavalry Regiment of the Imperial Guard. During the Invasion of Russia, he gained the command of the newly created Third Lithuanian Light Cavalry Regiment of the Guard, but in October, 1812, during the banquet in Słonim the day before the march out, was taken prisoner by the Russians. His imprisonment destroyed his health, and he died in January, 1815. Other sources mention Konopka in December 1814, naming him as the newly nominated brigadier-general of the army of Congress Poland.

== See also ==
- Timeline of the Peninsular War

== Bibliography ==
- ciudadreal (2020). "The battle for the Guadiana bridges in Ciudad Real 1809". Archived from the original on 11 March 2020.
- Kirkor, Stanisław (1981). Legia Nadwiślańska 1808-1814. London.
- Kukiel, Marian (1998). Dzieje oręża polskiego w epoce napoleońskiej. Poznań. ISBN 83-86600-51-9.
- Nafziger, George; Wesolowski, Mariusz T.; Devoe, Tom (1991). Poles and Saxons of the Napoleonic Wars. Chicago: Emperor's Press. ISBN 0-9626655-2-5.
- Wojciechowski, Kajetan (1978). Pamiętniki moje w Hiszpanii. Warszawa.
- Gery (2017). "Uhlans of the Vistula in Spain, part 2" (in Polish). Archived from the original on 2 May 2017.
- cerespain (2016). "Los Yebenes". Archived from the original on 5 March 2016.
- Miley (2016). "Los Yebenes". Archived from the original on 10 February 2020.
- Korczyk (2016). "Nasza księgarnia" (in Polish). Archived from the original on 11 September 2016.

Preceded by Battle of Villafranca (1809)	Napoleonic Wars; Battle of Los Yébenes	Succeeded by Battle of Ciudad Real
