= José de Urbina y Urbina, 3rd Conde de Cartaojal =

José de Urbina y Urbina, 3rd conde de Cartaojal
- Born: April 21, 1761; Málaga
- Died: March 22, 1833 (aged 71); Antequera
- Military career
- Allegiance: Kingdom of Spain
- Branch: Army of Spain
- Service years: 1771 – 1833
- Rank: Lieutenant General
- Unit: Royal Guard
- Commands: Army of the Center
- Conflicts: American Revolutionary War; Siege of Gibraltar; War of the First Coalition; War of the Pyrenees; Spanish War of Independence; Battle of Yevenes; Battle of Ciudad-Real

José de Urbina y Urbina, 3rd conde de Cartaojal (April 21, 1761 – March 22, 1833) was a Spanish soldier, general, and intendant during the Revolutionary and Napoleonic Wars.

== Military career ==
Cartaojal enlisted as a cadet in the Royal Guard in 1771 while studying at the Royal School of Mathematics in Barcelona. Upon the declaration of war with Britain in 1779, his grenadier company was posted to the siege lines around Gibraltar. Promoted alférez (1783), segundo ayudante (1788), and primer ayudante (1791), Cartaojal campaigned against the French Republicans in 1793, was wounded in action, and received a colonelcy (1793) and captaincy (1795).

Between 1796 and 1801, Cartaojal, now Brigadier General, served on the Board of Ordnance, later on the staff of the Army of Galicia, and with the field army assembled at Badajoz for the invasion of Portugal. As a protégé of Prime Minister Godoy, Cartaojal enjoyed a string of political and military appointments, with administrative posts as Captain General of Salamanca (1802) and intendant of Madrid (1803).

At the French invasion of 1808, Cartaojal rallied to the insurgents and placed himself at the orders of General Cuesta in Valladolid, who dispatched him to Seville to give an account to the Juntas of the Spanish defeat at Medina de Rioseco. Promoted Lieutenant General upon Napoleon's destruction of the Spanish armies, Cartaojal took to the field with a reconstituted Army of the Centre but was crushed by General Sebastiani at the Battle of Ciudad-Real and sacked for incompetence.

In February 1810 Cartaojal defected to the French occupiers and was granted an audience with King Joseph Bonaparte, who appointed him conseiller d'État and commissary for the Province of La Mancha and the Province of Toledo. But, apparently regretting his decision, the count delivered himself to the guerrilleros April 5 and was conducted to the Cortes of Cádiz – which served as a parliamentary Regency after Ferdinand VII was deposed – to be tried for treason. Absolved in 1813, Cartaojal was nonetheless held in suspicion for his liberalism and appointed only to the Army of Granada, far from the front in the north.
