= Jean-Baptiste Cyrus de Valence =

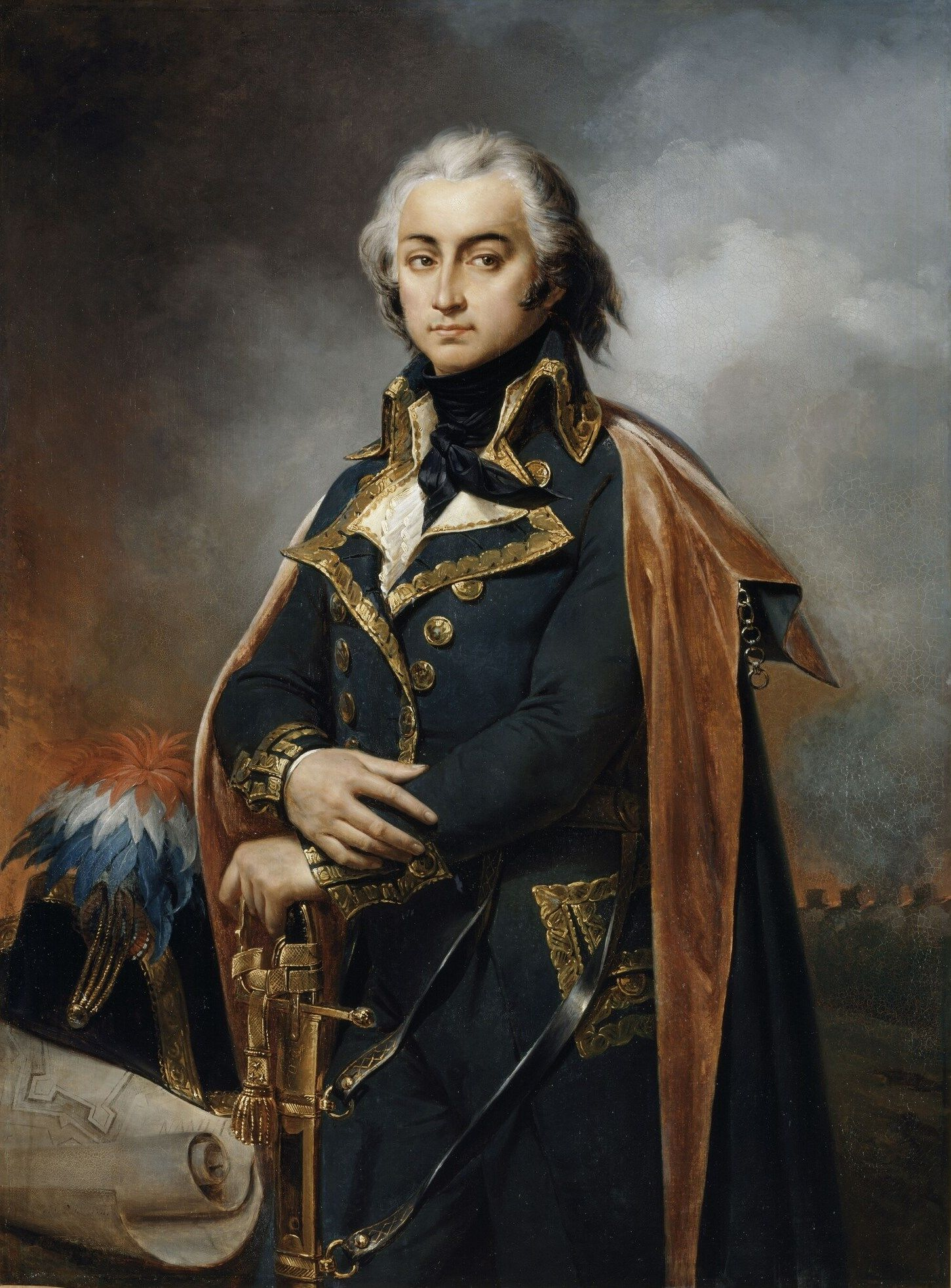
- Jean-Baptiste Cyrus de Valence
- Born: 22 September 1757; Agen, France
- Died: 4 February 1822 (aged 64) Paris, France
- Allegiance: (Kingdom of France); France
- Branch: Infantry
- Service years: 1778–1793, 1799–1816
- Rank: General of Division
- Conflicts: War of the First Coalition; Battle of Valmy; Battle of Neerwinden; Peninsular War; Battle of Ciudad Real; Battle of Almonacid; War of the Sixth Coalition; Battle of Borodino; Battle of Vyazma
- Awards: Count of the Empire, 1808
- Other work: Sénat conservateur, 1805

Jean-Baptiste Cyrus de Timbrune de Thiembronne, Comte de Valence (French pronunciation: [ʒɑ̃ batist siʁys də tɛ̃bʁyn də tjɑ̃bʁɔn də valɑ̃s]; 22 September 1757 – 4 February 1822) commanded French troops during the French Revolutionary Wars and the Napoleonic Wars. A nobleman, he joined the French Royal Army as a captain of cavalry in 1778. By the time of the French Revolution he commanded a cavalry regiment. Valence led troops at Valmy in 1792 and was soon appointed to command the Army of the Ardennes. He led the right wing at Neerwinden. Becoming involved in Charles Francois Dumouriez's failed plot to seize control of the army, he defected in April 1793.

Valence returned to France during an amnesty and was elected to the Sénat conservateur in 1805. Emperor Napoleon named him to lead an infantry division in the Peninsular War where he led Polish troops at Ciudad Real and Almonacid in 1809. He commanded a heavy cavalry division during the French invasion of Russia leading his horsemen at Borodino and Vyazma. He served with Paul Grenier and Horace Sébastiani in the Hundred Days. After the Bourbon Restoration he entered the Chamber of Peers in 1819 and died in 1822. VALENCE is one of the names inscribed under the Arc de Triomphe, on Column 4.

== Bibliography ==
- Broughton, Tony. "Generals Who Served in the French Army during the Period 1789-1814: Vabre to Voulland". The Napoleon Series.
- Mullié, Charles (1852). Biographie des célébrités militaires des armées de terre et de mer de 1789 a 1850 (in French). Paris.
- Oman, Charles (2010). A History of the Peninsular War Volume I. La Vergne, Tenn.: Kessinger Publishing.
- Oman, Charles (1995). A History of the Peninsular War Volume II. Mechanicsburg, Pennsylvania: Stackpole.
- Phipps, Ramsay Weston (2011). The Armies of the First French Republic: Volume I The Armée du Nord. USA: Pickle Partners Publishing.
- Smith, Digby (1998). The Napoleonic Wars Data Book. London: Greenhill.
