= Battle of Berry-au-Bac =

1814 battle during the War of the Sixth Coalition

- Part of the French campaign of the War of the Sixth Coalition
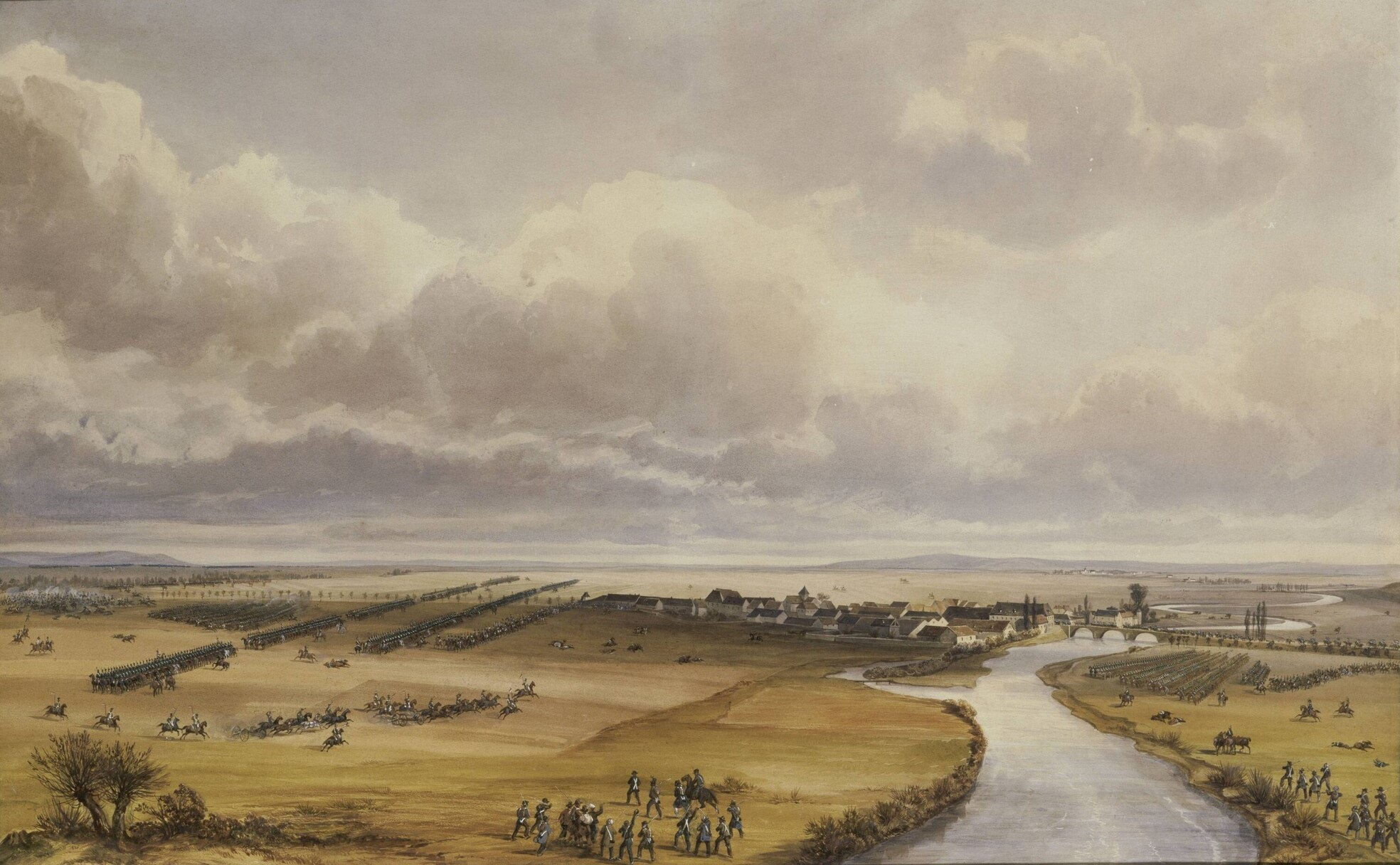
- Combat of Berry-au-Bac, 5 March 1814, around noon by Siméon Fort (1840). To the right, French cavalrymen cross the bridge of Berry-au-Bac. To the left, squadrons of the Imperial Guard in line formation outside the town.
Date	5 March 1814
Location	Berry-au-Bac, Aisne, France 49°24′16″N 3°54′08″E
Result	French victory

Belligerents
(First French Empire) France	(Russian Empire) Russia

Commanders and leaders
(First French Empire) Napoleon (First French Empire) Étienne de Nansouty	(Russian Empire) Ferdinand von Wintzingerode

Strength
Unknown	2,000 men

Casualties and losses
Unknown	200 captured 2 guns lost

The Battle of Berry-au-Bac was fought on 5 March 1814 at Berry-au-Bac, northern France, between French cavalry under the command of Emperor Napoleon and the Cossacks of Russian general Ferdinand von Wintzingerode. During the engagement, the French captured Berry-au-Bac's bridge over the Aisne and repulsed the Russian cavalry, allowing the rest of Napoleon's troops to cross the river. The battle was part of the French campaign of the War of the Sixth Coalition.

== Prelude ==
After the capitulation of the city of Soissons on 3 March, Prussian marshal Gebhard von Blücher, surrounded by Napoleon's army, managed with his men to escape annihilation. The Emperor, seeing that his maneuver had failed, nevertheless decided to pursue the Prussians and ordered General Nansouty to seize the bridge of Berry-au-Bac in order to allow the rest of the army to cross the Aisne river. Nansouty set out with his cavalry, consisting of the Polish Lancers of the Imperial Guard under General Pac and General Exelmans' division. On 5 March, the French arrived in front of the town defended by 2,000 Russian Cossacks of General Wintzingerode's army corps, who had positioned themselves in front of the bridge.

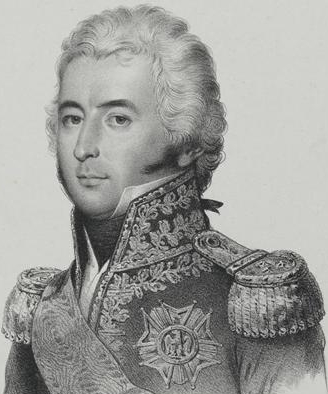
General Étienne de Nansouty.

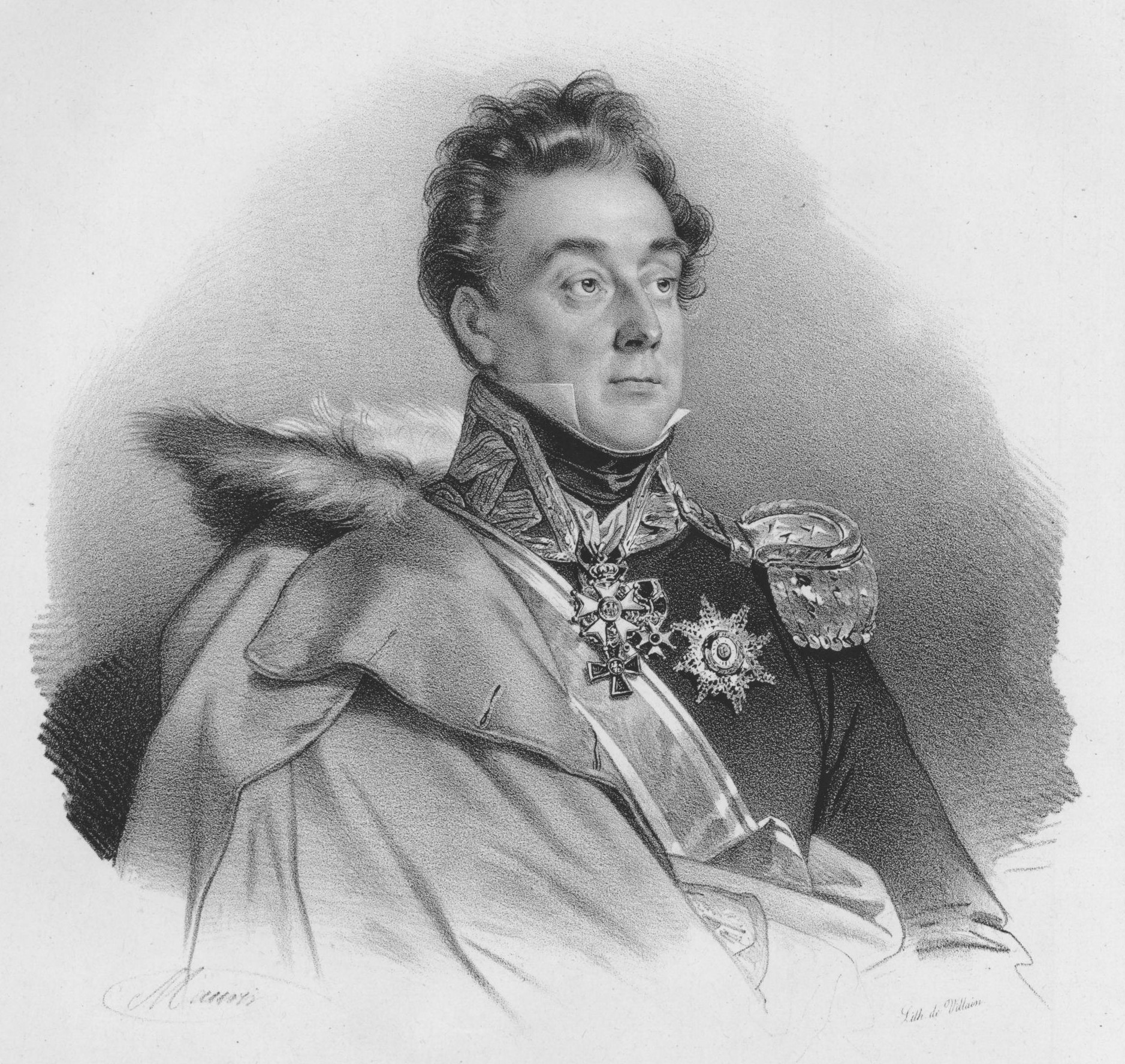
General Ludwik Michał Pac.

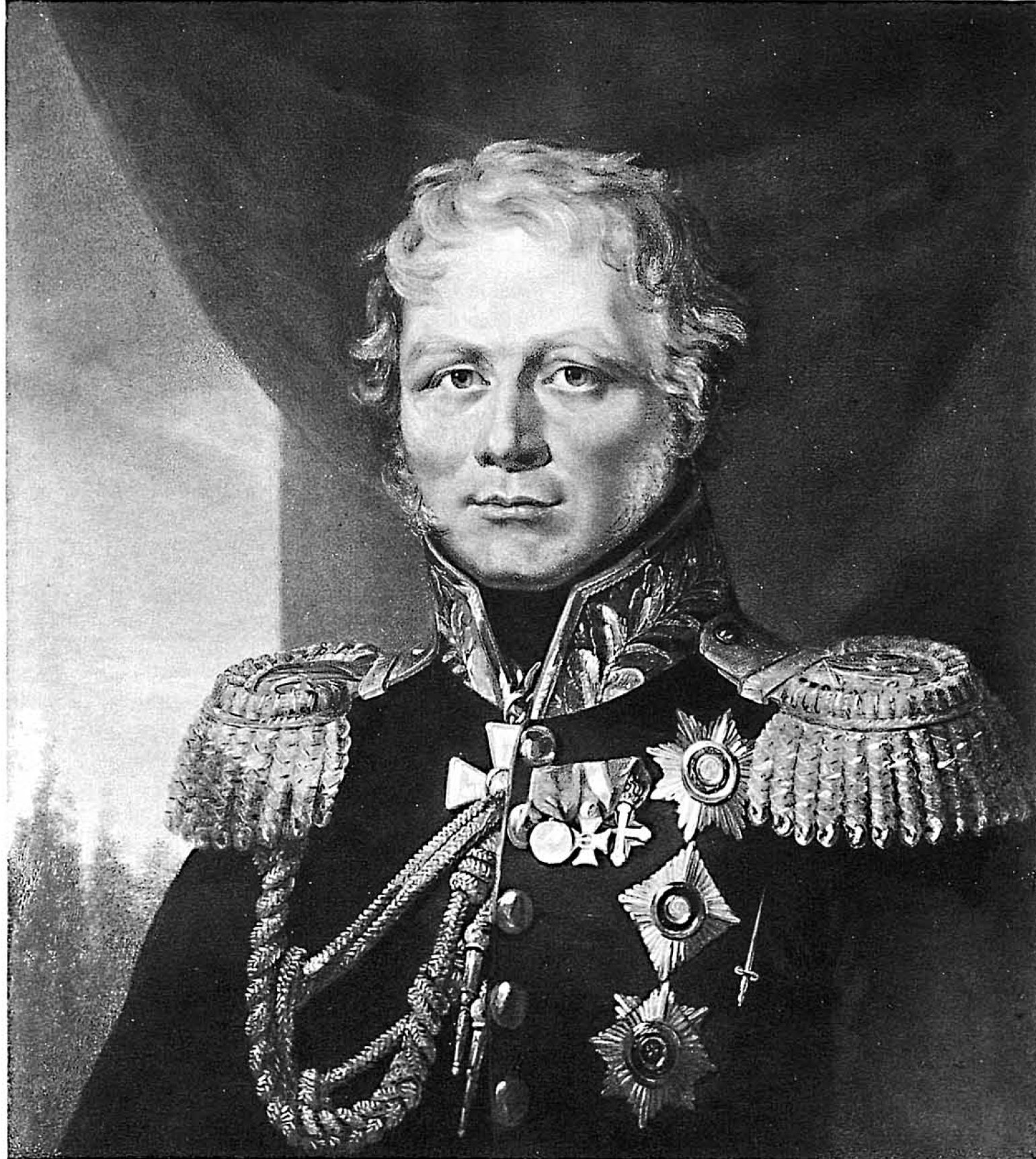
General Ferdinand von Wintzingerode.

== Battle ==
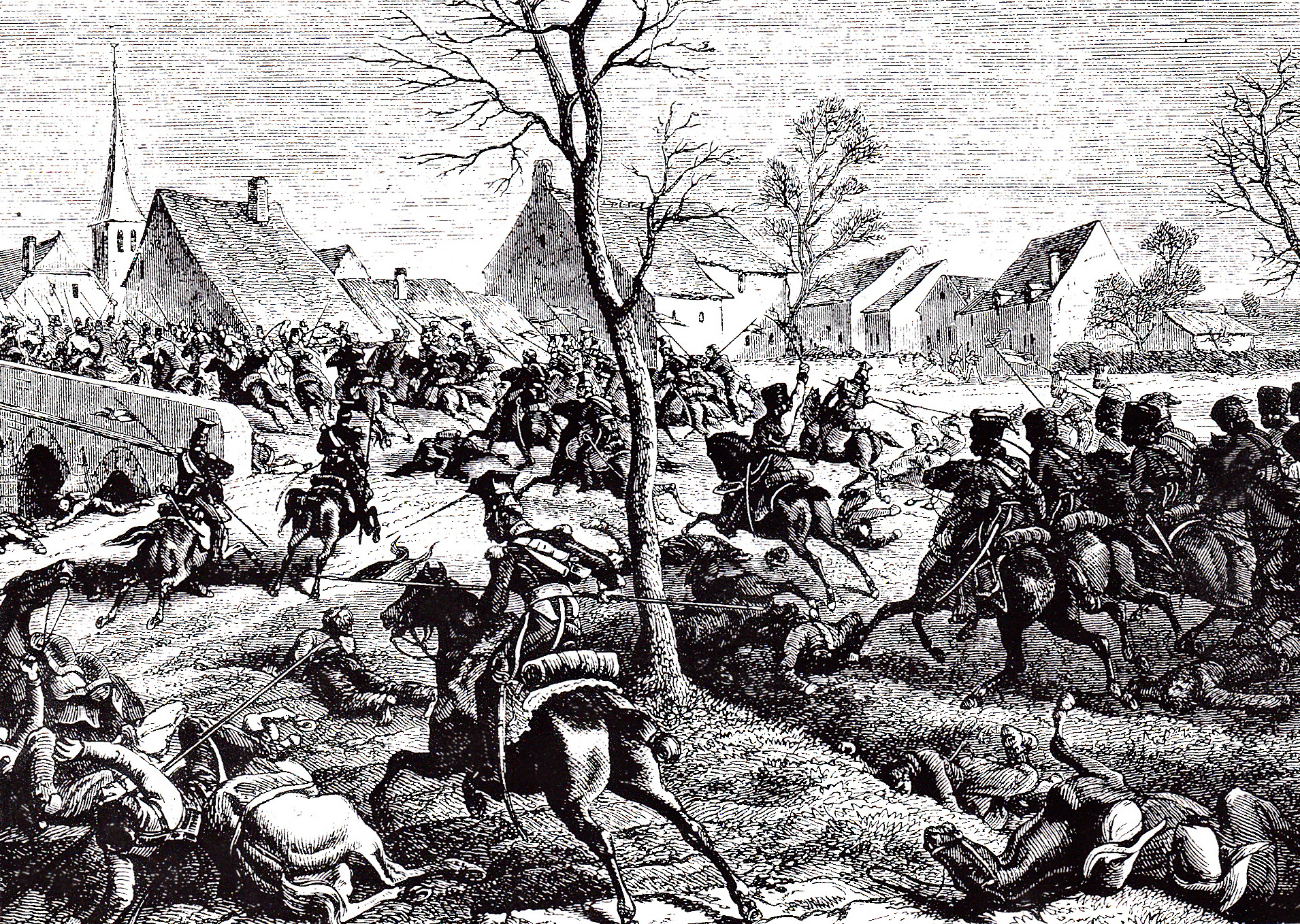
Polish lancers, followed by the Mounted Chasseurs of the Imperial Guard, capture the bridge of Berry-au-Bac. Illustration by Félix Philippoteaux.

The Polish lancers, encouraged by Napoleon's presence on the battlefield, charged the Russians, who were quickly pushed back and forced to cross the bridge in disorder. Followed by the squadrons of Nansouty and Exelmans, General Pac's cavalry crossed the bridge at a gallop and set off in pursuit of the Cossacks. During hand-to-hand combat, chef d'escadron Ambroży Skarżyński wrestled a lance from a Russian cavalryman and used it to put several opponents out of combat, as did other Polish officers.

The fleeing Russians attempted to regroup beyond La Ville-aux-Bois, but were once more dispersed by the Imperial Guard cavalry and driven into Corbeny. During the combat, Nansouty's troops captured 200 Cossacks, two artillery pieces and the enemy's baggage.

== Aftermath ==
Skarżyński was made a Baron of the Empire for his performance during the battle. The capture of Berry-au-Bac and its bridge allowed the corps of marshals Ney, Mortier, and Marmont to cross the Aisne and continue to pursue the retreating Prussian army. Blücher, informed of this movement, deployed his men to the Craonne plateau to stop the French, who faced him on 7 March and forced him to retreat again after the hard-fought Battle of Craonne.

== Sources ==
- Tranié, Jean; Carmigniani, Juan-Carlos (1989). Napoléon : 1814 - La campagne de France. Pygmalion/Gérard Watelet. ISBN 2-85704-301-5.
- Tranié, Jean; Carmigniani, Juan-Carlos (1982). Les Polonais de Napoléon : l'épopée du 1er régiment de lanciers de la Garde impériale. Copernic.
