= 3rd Light Cavalry Lancers Regiment of the Imperial Guard (Lithuanian) =

- 3-iasis lietuvių gvardijos lengvosios kavalerijos
- Active: 5 July 1812 – 22 March 1813
- Country: France
- Branch: Imperial Guard
- Type: Light Cavalry
- Size: Regiment
- Engagements: Napoleonic Wars: French invasion of Russia; Battle of Slonim

Commanders
- Notable commanders: General Jan Konopka

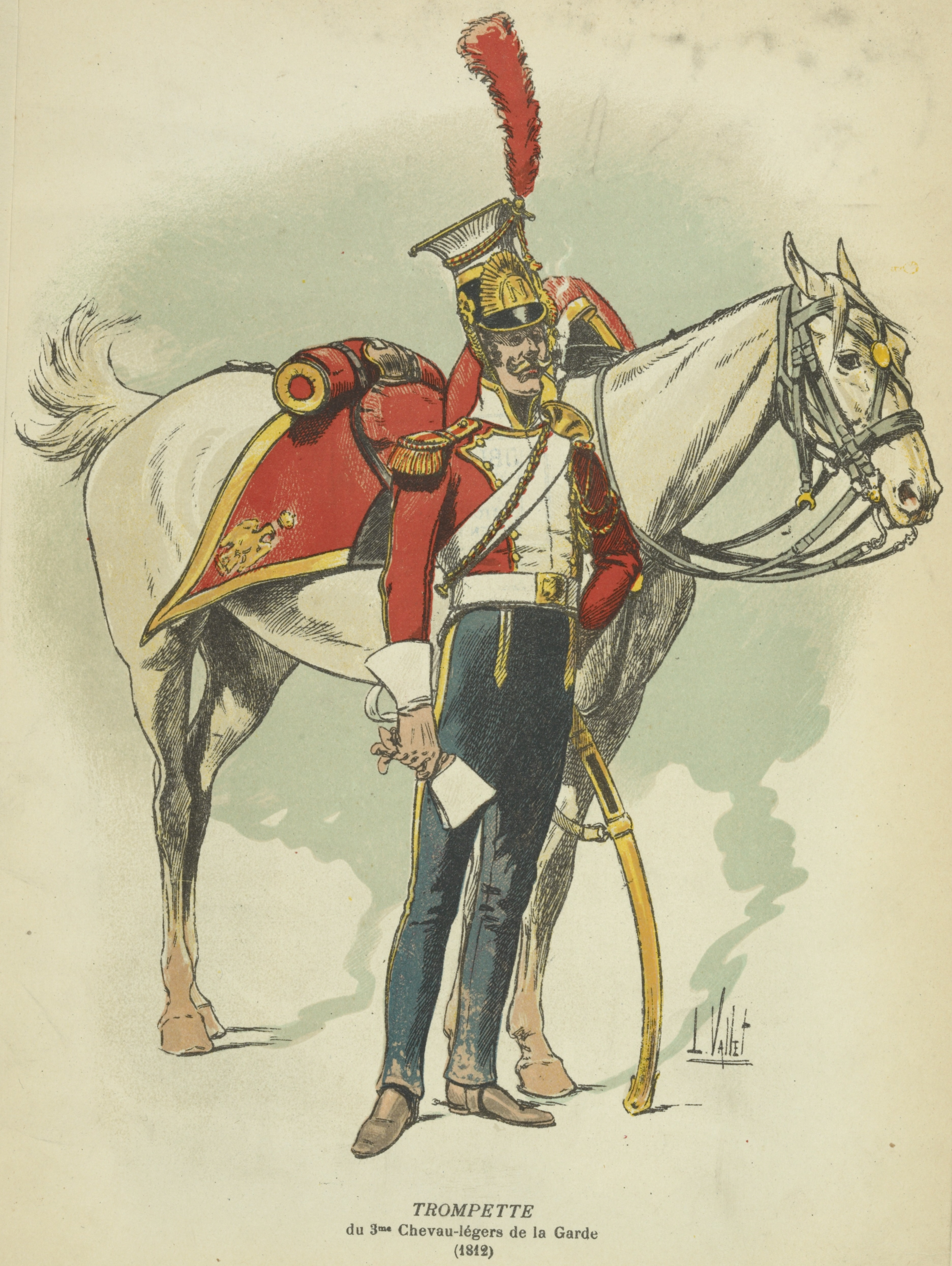
Trumpeter of the regiment in 1812.

The 3rd Lithuanian Light Cavalry Lancers Regiment of the Imperial Guard (French: 3e régiment de chevau-légers lanciers de la Garde impériale (Lituanien) / Lithuanian: 3-iasis lietuvių gvardijos lengvosios kavalerijos (švoležierių) pulkas) was a foreign Lithuanian light cavalry lancers regiment which served as part of Napoleon's Imperial Guard during the Napoleonic Wars.

Formed during the French invasion of Russia with members of the Lithuanian nobility, the regiment came under the command of General Jan Konopka, Major of the Polish Lancers of the Imperial Guard. Tasked with going to Minsk in October 1812, two squadrons under Konopka's command were annihilated en route to Slonim by Russian troops; the last two squadrons, therefore, constitute the nucleus of the corps. The 3rd Lancers was finally disbanded on 22 March 1813 and its elements were incorporated into the Polish Lancers of the Imperial Guard.

Napoleon quickly realized the military potential offered by the Lithuanians and wanted to create a large Lithuanian army. He personally takes care of the units of the Imperial Guard, counting, in addition to the Lithuanian lancers, a squadron of the Lithuanian Tatars of the Imperial Guard.

== Organisation ==
At the start of the Russian campaign in 1812, the Grande Armée was enthusiastically received by the Lithuanian population, so Napoleon decided to take advantage of the situation. On 5 July 1812, he decreed the formation of the 3rd regiment of lancers integrated into the Imperial Guard, with a theoretical strength of 1,218 men divided into five squadrons. Two squadrons were then formed in Warsaw with Lithuanian nobles. General Jan Konopka, Major of the Polish 1st Guards Lancers, took command of the corps, assisted by Majors Tanski and Chlusowicz. The volunteers must obtain the uniform, the horse and the necessary equipment at their own expense: the decree fixes the size of the horses between 4 feet 6 inches and 4 feet 9 inches, and the pay is the same as that of the 2nd Light Cavalry Lancers Regiment of the Imperial Guard.

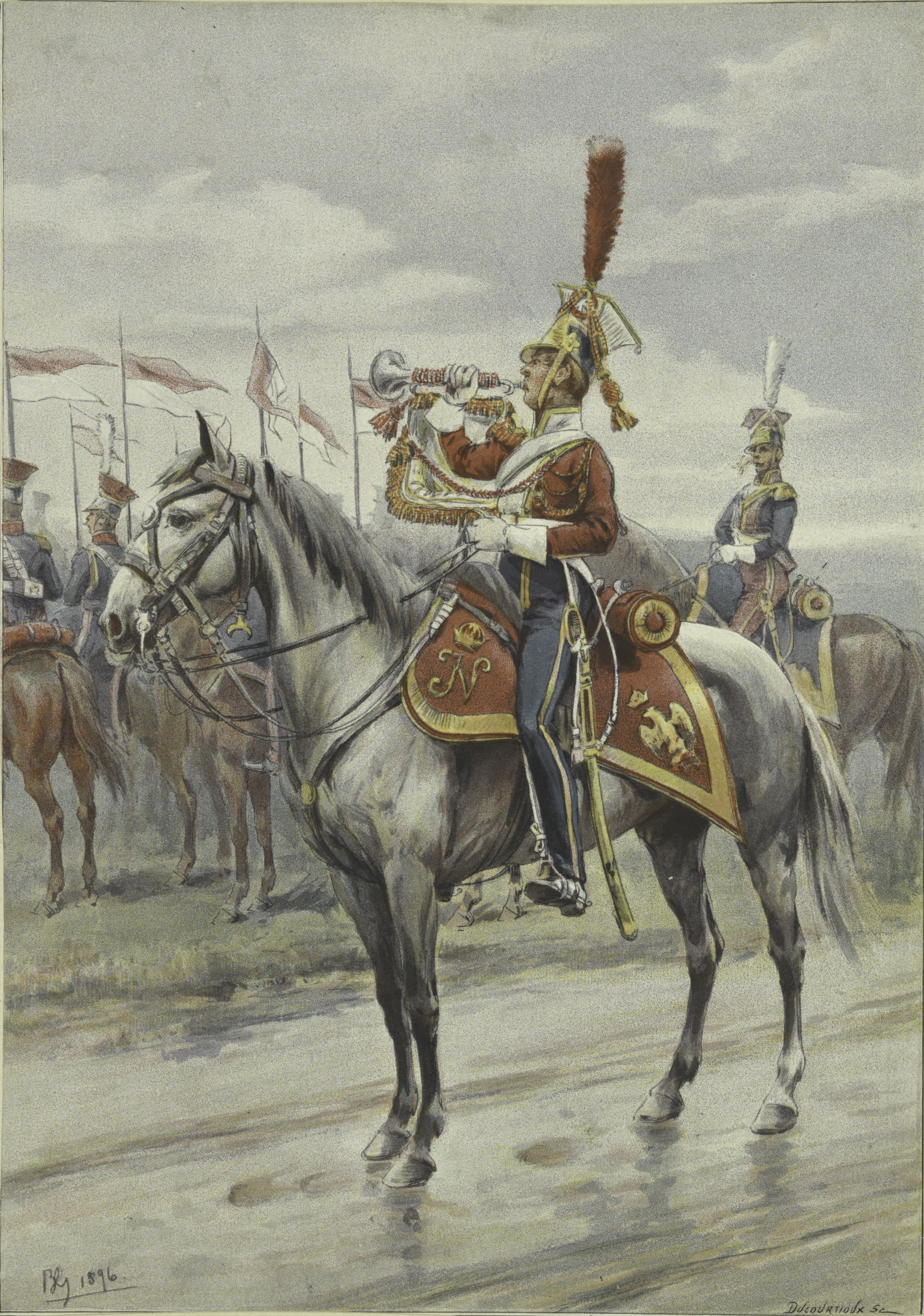
The regiment in 1812.

== Disaster at Slonim ==
In 1812 began the Russian campaign in which the regiment took part. In October, General Konopka received the order in Grodno to lead his two squadrons to Minsk and decided on the way to stop at the village of Slonim. The lancers were confined there for several days, despite the remarks of Colonel-Major Casimir Tanski who was sent back to Grodno by Konopka. On October 19, the night following its departure, the 3rd Lancers were ambushed by General Czaplicz's Russian soldiers, belonging to Admiral Pavel Chichagov's army corps. General Konopka, wounded, was taken prisoner with 55 officers and non-commissioned officers, 5 trumpets and 186 light horses, the others being killed or wounded. The lancers also lost the papers and accounts of the corps as well as important equipment. Only Captain Ambroży Mikołaj Skarżyński's squadron survived the ambush.

The two other squadrons recently formed, under the orders of Colonel-Major Tanski in Grodno, therefore constituted the 3rd Lancers and received in January 1813 a reinforcement of 60 Lithuanian gendarmes. The same month, the light horses were attached to the 1st light cavalry lancer regiment. On 22 March 1813, the corps was officially dissolved and its elements transferred to the 1st regiment of lancers of the Guard, but this merger only became effective on April 11.

== Uniforms ==
"General Konopka formed [the regiment] for Napoleon's guard; it was composed largely of young people from the first families of Lithuania and Volhynia; one cannot form an idea of the richness and elegance of their costumes and the beauty of their horses."

— Statement by Alexandre Andrault de Langeron, French general in the service of the Russian Empire, in his Memoirs.

The regiment's uniforms are made under the responsibility of Lieutenant Cichocki, in charge of clothing. Unable to establish a store of supplies in a country at war, the lancers receive their effects as and when villages are encountered and contracts made between the clothing officer and the local inhabitants.

The dress is similar to that of the 1st Polish Lancer regiment; only the buttons, in brass or gold, as well as the piping and cords, yellow or gold, differ. An illustration from Ronald Pawly's Napoleon's Polish Lancers of the Imperial Guard shows a 3rd Regiment lancer based on a contemporary watercolour. The rider represented wears a czapska in crimson fluted cloth, surmounted by a white plume, with cords and rackets of the same. The czapska is adorned on the front with a copper plate. The "kurtka" (coat) is blue with crimson lapels, with white braid and buttons. The facings and turnbacks are crimson and piped white. The epaulette, the aiguillette and the belt are white. The road pants are grey canvas, with a crimson band trimmed with a row of white buttons. In trumpets, the czapska is white with yellow or crimson cords and crimson plume. The kurtka is crimson with white lapels and gold piping. The pants are blue with a double yellow stripe.

== Sources ==
- Pigeard, Alain (1999-01-01). "Le 3e régiment de chevau-légers lanciers". Tradition (in French). No. 8 (hors-série) - Napoléon et les troupes polonaises 1797-1815 : De l'Armée d'Italie à la Grande Armée.
- Pawly, Ronald (2007). Napoleon's Polish Lancers of the Imperial Guard. Men-at-Arms. Osprey Publishing. ISBN 978-1-84603-256-1.
