= Battle of Ciudad Real =

1809 Battle of the Peninsular War

- Part of the Peninsular War
Date	27 March 1809
Location	Ciudad Real, Province of Ciudad Real, Castile-La Mancha, Spain 38°58′15″N 4°00′25″W
Result	Franco-Polish victory

Belligerents
(France) French Empire (Poland) Duchy of Warsaw	Kingdom of Spain

Commanders and leaders
(France) Horace Sebastiani	(Spain) Conde de Cartaojal

Strength
12,700	12,500

Casualties and losses
100	3,000

Peninsular War: Castile & Andalusia
current battle

The Battle of Ciudad Real was fought on 27 March 1809 and resulted in a French victory under General Sebastiani against the Spanish under General Conde de Cartojal.

== Background ==
The Spanish campaign in early 1809 started with the Battle of Uclés.

== Battle ==
French 4th Corps (with attached Polish division under general Valance) had to cross the bridge over the Guadiana River which was defended by the Spanish corps of Count Urbina Cartaojal. Polish lancers of the Legion of the Vistula under colonel Jan Konopka charged through the bridge taking it by surprise, then outflanked Spanish infantry and attacked it from behind as the main French and Polish forces crossed the bridge, and attacked the Spanish front lines.

The battle was over when undisciplined Spanish soldiers dispersed, and began to retreat in the direction of Santa Cruz. Józef Rudnicki, adjutant-major of the 4th Infantry Regiment of the Legion, described the battle in his diaries (spelling according to the original):

as soon as the French regiments of the 4th Corps met our division, we rushed immediately toward the Consuegra and Ciudad Real, before of which town we found the Spanish corps, waiting for us on good positions. We were outnumbered, but thanks to the rational orders of the general Sebastiani, in some od four hours on 27 March 1809 the Spaniards were defeated and dispersed. They were retreating in chaos toward Almagro, where the Order of Calatrava has its home, and toward the Santa Cruz de Mudela, and even further, into the Sierramorena Mountains.

== Results ==
The Spanish corps lost some 2000 men killed or wounded and many more were taken prisoner. After the battle the count of Cartojal was deprived of command for incompetency, and replaced by general Venegas, hero of the Spanish War of Independence, and later the viceroy of New Spain.

== Aftermath ==
The Spanish campaign in early 1809 proceeded with the first Madrid offensive in the Battle of Medellín.

== See also ==
- Timeline of the Peninsular War

== Bibliography ==
- Bodart, Gaston (1908). Militär-historisches Kriegs-Lexikon (1618–1905).
- Druk (1862). Pismo zbiorowe wileńskie na rok 1862. W Druk. A.H. Kirkora.
- Esdaile, Charles J. (2003). The Peninsular War. Palgrave MacMillan. ISBN 9781403962317.

Preceded by Battle of Los Yébenes	Napoleonic Wars; Battle of Ciudad Real	Succeeded by First Battle of Porto
