= Jan Konopka =

Baron of the Empire Jan Konopka
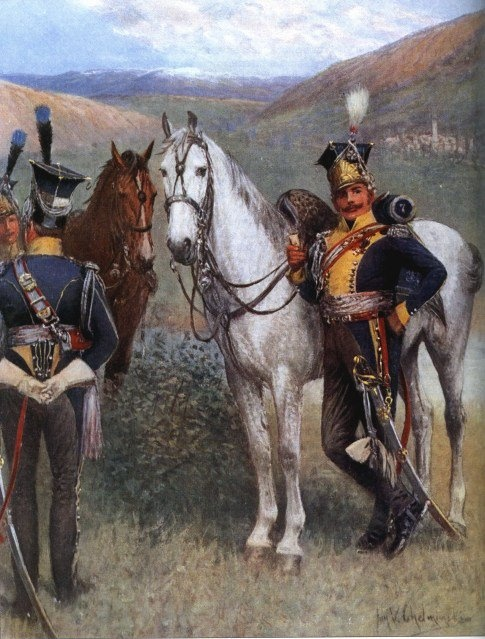
- 'The devil Pole', Vistula Uhlan in Spain by Jan Chelminski
- Born: c. 1777; Near Slonim, Belarus
- Died: 12 December 1814; Warsaw, Poland
- Military career
- Allegiance: (Polish–Lithuanian Commonwealth) Polish-Lithuanian Commonwealth; French First Republic (First French Empire) French Empire; Duchy of Warsaw
- Branch: Crown Army; French Revolutionary Army; French Imperial Army; Army of the Duchy of Warsaw
- Service years: 1792–1812
- Rank: (Polish–Lithuanian Commonwealth) Lieutenant (French First Republic) Captain (First French Empire) Brigadier-general (Duchy of Warsaw) Brigadier-general
- Units: Legion of the Vistula; National Ukrainian Cavalry Brigade
- Commands: 3rd Regiment of Lithuanian Guards
- Conflicts: War in Defence of the Constitution; Battle of Zieleńce; Kościuszko Uprising; Battle of Maciejowice; French Revolutionary Wars; Italian campaigns; Napoleonic Wars; War of the Fourth Coalition; Battle of Friedland; Peninsular War; Battle of Ciudad Real; Battle of Los Yébenes; Battle of Albuera; French invasion of Russia
- Awards: Legion of Honour

Jan Konopka (1777 in Skołodycze near Słonim – 12 December 1814 in Warsaw) was a lieutenant in the Kościuszko Uprising, captain of the Polish Legions in Italy, regiment commander in the Legion of the Vistula, as well as general of the French Army and the Duchy of Warsaw. Konopka has been described as "a brave man with cold mind in combat."

== Biography ==
Konopka was the son of Anna, a distant relative of the Princes of Conde, and Franciszek Konopka, a major in Lithuanian army of the Polish–Lithuanian Commonwealth. From 1792 he was a Second Lieutenant in the Ukrainska Brygada Kawalerii Narodowej (National Ukrainian Cavalry Brigade) and took part in the Polish–Russian War of 1792 (in Poland known as War in Defence of the Constitution). He fought in the Battle of Zieleńce and was decorated. During the Kościuszko Uprising he fought as a lieutenant at Battle of Maciejowice, was wounded, and decorated again. After the failure of the insurrection he emigrated to France and volunteered for the French army.

In 1797 Konopka joined the Polish Legions in Italy with a rank of captain and took part in all of the Legion's campaigns. After the dissolution of the Legion, he returned to service in France as a Major. He was soon made a regiment commander in the Legion of the Vistula. He fought in the War of the Fourth Coalition and for his part in the Battle of Friedland was decorated with the Légion d'honneur. Subsequently he fought as part of Napoleon's forces in the Peninsular War where he experienced further successes (for example, at the Battle of Ciudad-Real) as well as failures (at the Battle of Yevenes). In 1811 he was made a general of the French army after the Battle of Albuera and later of, Duchy of Warsaw, and a Baron of the French Empire.

During Napoleon's invasion of Russia in 1812 he was made the commander of the 3rd Regiment of Lithuanian Guards. Due to an absent minded mistake he allowed himself to be surprised and attacked by General Eufemiusz Czaplic. Some sources report that he quartered in Slonim too long, hoping to train newly recruited volunteers and throwing banquets, while others state that he decided to attack a numerically superior force. Most of his unit was captured, the rest scattered (only the Lipka Tatar units that were out on patrol escaped) and he himself was wounded and taken prisoner. Konopka was interned in Cherson. After being released from prison in 1814 he was offered the command of the 1st Cavalry Brigade of Congress Poland but he declined. Exhausted by wounds, prison, and fatigue he died the same year in Warsaw.
