= Battle of Warsaw =

Battles of Warsaw may refer to:

== Northern War battles ==
- Battle of Warka (April 7, 1656)
- Siege of Warsaw (1656), Warsaw retaken by Poles from Swedes on June 30, 1656
- Battle of Warsaw (1656), battle outside the city on July 18–20, 1656
- Capture of Warsaw (1657), Warsaw taken by Transylvanian, Swedish, Cossack, and Moldavian forces on June 17, 1657
- Battle of Warsaw (1705), fought on July 31, during the Great Northern War
- Battle of Praga (1705), fought on 25 October, during the Polish–Swedish War (1701–1706)

== Partition and Napoleonic Wars ==
- Warsaw Uprising (1794), better known as the Insurrection of Warsaw
- First Battle of Warsaw (1794), during the Kościuszko Uprising
- Battle of Praga or Second Battle of Warsaw (1794), during the later Kościuszko Uprising
- Battle of Raszyn (1809), during the Austro-Polish War

== November Uprising ==
- First Battle of Wawer, February 19–20, 1831
- Battle of Olszynka Grochowska, February 25, 1831
- Second Battle of Wawer, March 31, 1831
- Battle of Warsaw (1831), September 6–8

== World War I and Polish-Soviet War battles ==
- Battle of the Vistula River or the Battle of Warsaw (1914), during World War I
- Second Battle of the Vistula River second battle of Warsaw (1915), during World war I
- Battle of Warsaw (1915), during World War I
- Battle of Warsaw (1920) August 13–16, 1920, during the Polish–Soviet War
  - Battle of Radzymin (1920), one theatre of the Battle of Warsaw

== World War II battles ==
- Battle of Warsaw (1939), siege of Warsaw during the Invasion of Poland, at the outset of World War II
- Warsaw Ghetto Uprising (1943), fought in what is now the Muranow district during World War II
- Battle of Radzymin (1944), a clash between Soviet and German tank armies
- Warsaw Uprising or Battle of Warsaw (1944)
- Battle of Warsaw (1945), part of Vistula–Oder offensive
