= Battle of Slonim =

1812 battle during the French invasion of Russia

- Part of the French invasion of Russia
Date	20 October [O.S. 8 October] 1812
Location	Slonim, Russian Empire (Modern day Belarus)
Result	Russian victory

Belligerents
Russian Empire	Duchy of Warsaw

Commanders and leaders
(Russian Empire) Yefim Chaplits	(Duchy of Warsaw) Jan Konopka (POW)

Units involved
Unknown	3rd Light Cavalry Lancers Regiment of the Imperial Guard

Strength
900	600

Casualties and losses
Unknown	480 casualties (Note: Including 13 officers and 253 soldiers captured)

The Battle of Slonim was a battle which took place on 20 October 1812 during the French invasion of Russia.

== Battle ==
Imperial Russian forces, under the command of Yefim Chaplits, took 4 cavalry squadrons, including the 3rd Light Cavalry Lancers Regiment of the Imperial Guard, by surprise.
