= Legion of the Vistula =

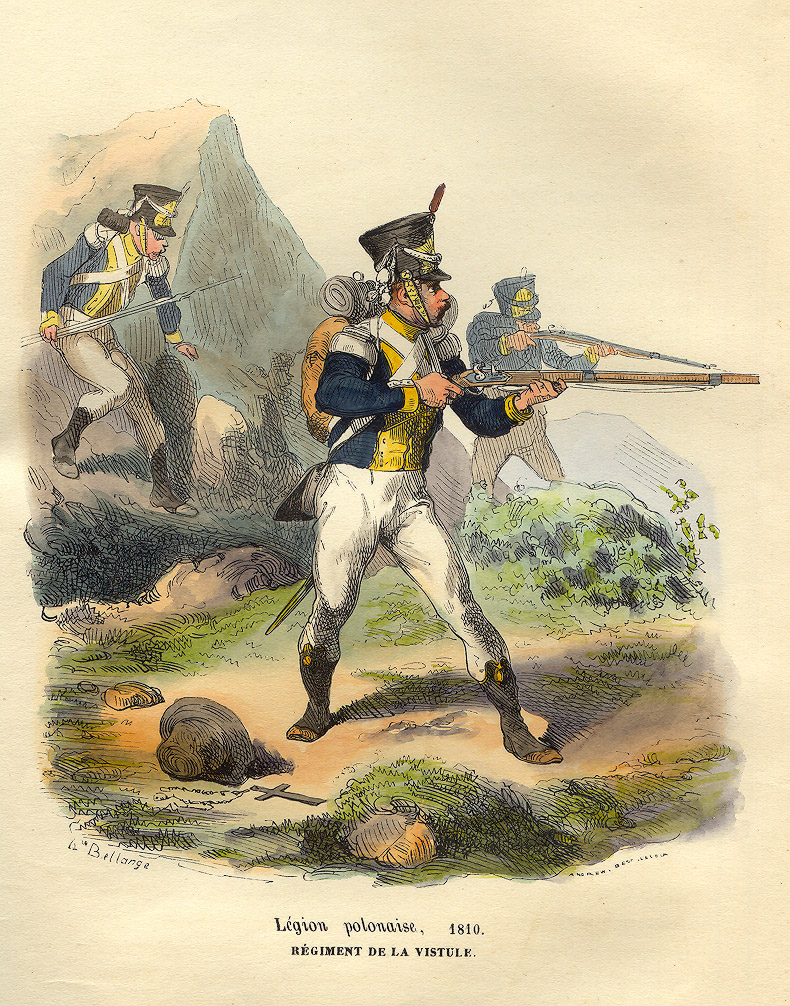
- Infantrymen of the Legion of the Vistula
- Active: 1807–1814
- Country: French First Empire
- Branch: French Imperial Army
- Engagements: Napoleonic Wars; Peninsular War; Siege of Zaragoza (1808); Siege of Zaragoza (1809); Battle of Los Yébenes; French invasion of Russia; Battle of Smolensk (1812); Battle of Borodino; War of the Sixth Coalition; Battle of Leipzig

The Legion of the Vistula (Polish: Legia Nadwiślańska, French: Légion de la Vistule) was a combined arms legion of the French Imperial Army which served in the Napoleonic Wars. Raised in 1806, the legion served in the Peninsular War, French invasion of Russia and War of the Sixth Coalition before being disbanded in 1814. It was one of the largest Polish Legions of the Napoleonic era.

== Creation of the Legion ==
The Legion was formed in Breslau, Neustadt, Brieg, Neisse and Friedland, in the region of Silesia in February 1807 from an infantry regiment and cavalry regiment in the service of the Kingdom of Naples that were descended from Jan Henryk Dąbrowski's Dąbrowski's Legions and Karol Kniaziewicz's Danube Legion originally raised in the 1790s. The new formation was expanded from the Neapolitan cadre into a formation of three infantry regiments and one cavalry regiment, initially named the Polish-Italian Legion as it had been organized around the Poles formerly in Italian service. Most of the recruits came from ex-Prussian and ex-Austrian territories, particularly Poznań and Galicia.

The Polish-Italian Legion fought its first engagement at the Siege of Kłodzko and then was transferred to Kingdom of Westphalia in October 1807 and was placed in garrison in the capital, Kassel where it was recruited to full authorized strength from Poles in French occupied territory. The newly expanded cavalry regiment arrived in Kassel on 11 November 1807.

Napoleon directed that the Legion be transferred to French service on 21 February 1808. The Legion was transferred to Poitiers, France and was officially renamed the Vistula Legion on 31 March 1808 with the equivalent status of French line units. The infantry was reorganized to the 1808 pattern of six company battalions in April of that year in conformance with the new French organization decreed on 18 February 1808. The Legion's depot was at Sedan. All of the personnel of the Legion were to be of Polish ethnicity except for the company clerks, the Fourier's, battalion adjutant non-commissioned officers and paymasters, who were to be French. The strength of the Legion was set at 5,959 men in June 1808. The 2nd and 3rd infantry regiments of the Vistula Legion in June 1808 and participated in Napoleon's invasion of Spain (the Peninsular War). On 24 March 1809 at the Battle of Los Yébenes, 600 of Polish lancers of the Legion of the Vistula lost all their squadron banners (which had not been defended because nobody knew they were hidden in the carriage) when they had cut through an ambush set by 5,000 Spaniards. The regiment was renamed in 1811 into the 7th Regiment of Chevau-légers Lancers Regiment.

Napoleon ordered a Second Vistula Legion formed from prisoners taken after his defeat of the Austrians at the Battle of Wagram in July 1809. Recruiting was slow and only two battalions were raised and were sent to Sedan in October 1809. Unlike the original legion, ethnic Germans were accepted into the new formation. The Second Vistula Legion was unable to recruit up to strength and was disbanded in February 1810 with its personnel being amalgamated with the original Legion as its 4th Regiment.

== Service in Spain ==
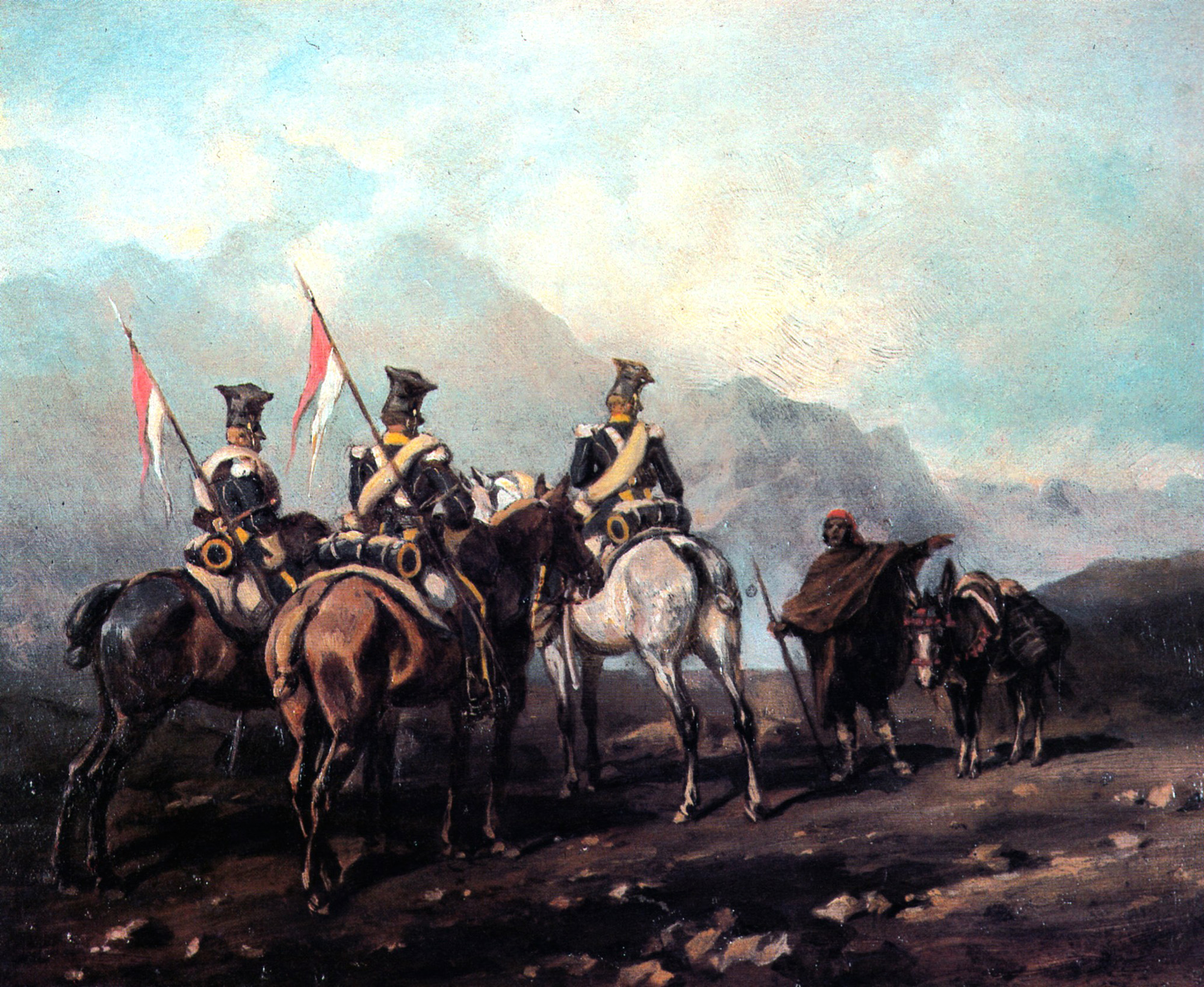
Lancers of the Vistula Legion on patrol in Spain during the Peninsular War by Juliusz Kossak, 1875

On 7 February 1811 a second lancer regiment was raised, and on June 18 of that year, the two lancer regiments were removed from the legion and redesignated as the 7th and 8th Chevauleger-lancier regiments of the French line, with six converted French dragoon regiments being numbered 1 to 6.

On 16 May 1811 the 1st Vistula Lancer Regiment at the Battle of Albuera struck three of the four exposed British foot regiments of Colborne's Brigade, causing heavy casualties.

== Service in Russia ==
The Legion was withdrawn from Spain early in 1812 in preparation for Napoleon's invasion of Russia. In March 1812 Napoleon ordered the four regiments to recruit a third battalion, raising them to three battalions apiece, plus a small regimental battery of two 3-pdr guns to be attached to each regiment as per the standard French practice of the time. The whole would serve together as a single division attached to the Young Guard commanded by General of Division Michel Claparède. The new third battalions of the regiments did not join their parent units until the retreat from Moscow was well underway. Of the approximately 7,000 members of the Legion who entered Russia, only about 1,500 returned.

== Service in Germany 1813 ==
On 18 June 1813 the survivors of the legion were reorganized into the single Vistula Regiment of two battalions.

== Service in France 1814 ==
The Vistula Regiment was again reformed early in 1814 at its depot at Sedan with all the remaining Polish infantrymen in French service being transferred to it.

After Napoleon's abdication, the survivors of the Legion returned to partitioned Poland.

== Waterloo ==
"In May 1815 (Hundred Days) the 7th Lancers was formed again. However they had only 13 horses for 350 men. In July they fought on foot near Paris, and were highly praised by Marshal Davout. When the war was over, the 7th Lancers was one of few Polish units that refused to serve under the Tsar of Russia and was disbanded in France."

== See also ==
- Polish Legions in Italy
- 1st Polish Light Cavalry Regiment of the Imperial Guard
- Army of the Duchy of Warsaw
- Duchy of Warsaw
