= Capture of Warsaw (1657) =

- Part of the Deluge, Brest Campaign, Second Northern War and Khmelnytsky Uprising
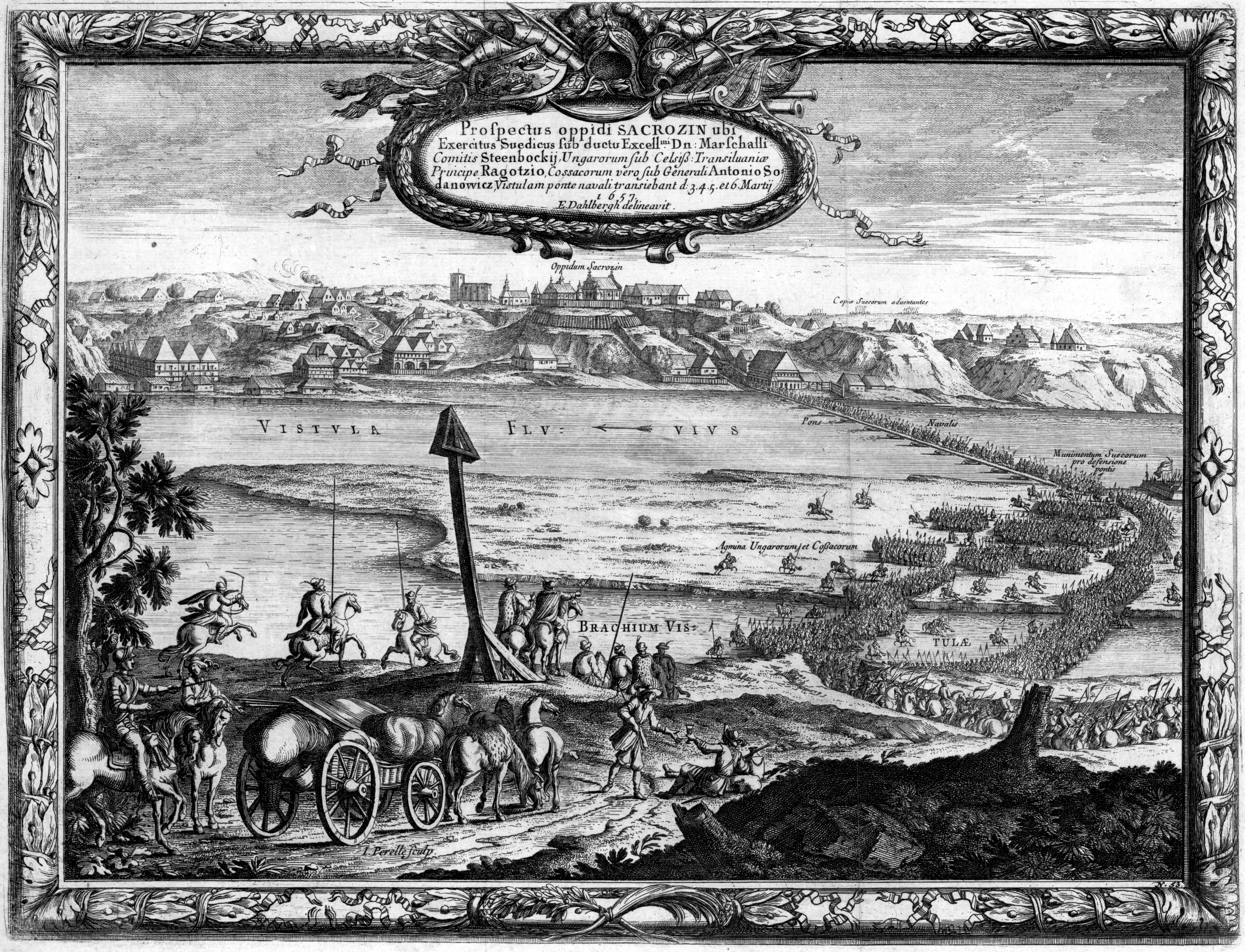
- The crossing of the Vistula by Swedish and Transylvanian troops in Zakroczym
| Date | 14–17 June 1657 |
| Location | Warsaw, Poland |
| Result | Transylvanian, Swedish, Cossack, Moldavian and Wallachian victory |
| Territorial changes | Temporary occupation of Warsaw until June 23 |

Belligerents
| Principality of Transylvania (yes) Swedish Empire; Cossack Hetmanate; Moldavia; Wallachia | Polish–Lithuanian Commonwealth |

Commanders and leaders
| (Transylvania) George II Rákóczi (yes) Gustaf Otto Stenbock; Anton Zhdanovych; Grigore Hăbășescu; Odivoianul | Eliasz Jan Łącki; Regulskiego |

Strength
| 40,000 | 1,000 |

The Capture of Warsaw in 1657 was conducted by the Transylvanian, Swedish, Cossack, Moldavian and Wallachian forces against the Polish–Lithuanian garrison, as part of the Brest Campaign led by George II Rákóczi, during 14–17 June.

== Prelude ==
In January 1657, Transylvanian Prince George II Rákóczi intervened into Poland with his Swedish and Cossack allies. Prince Rákóczi headed a total of 40,000 troops with him. However, Rákóczi largely avoided Polish-Lithuanian forces, with exception of Brest in May. Rákóczi now intended to capture Warsaw during June. Anton Zhdanovych led his Cossacks during Rákóczi's campaign, including besieging Warsaw. There were also around 2,000 Moldavian troops under the command of Grigore Hăbășescu and another 2,000 Wallachian troops under boyar Odivoianul.

== Siege ==
On 12 June, Cossacks were already near Warsaw, but the attacks only begun with arrival of Rákóczi on 14 June. Polish commander Eliasz Jan Łącki was in charge of the defense of Warsaw and repulsed initial Transylvanian assaults. On 15 June, Transylvanian attacks were again repulsed and Polish-Lithuanian forces conducted successful sorties outside of their defenses. On 16 June, Warsaw garrison commander Regulskiego defected to Transylvanian-led side, which came as a surprise. On 17 June, Warsaw garrison was willing to negotiate a surrender. Agreement included exchange of prisoners and promise to spare the city. However, Swedish commander Gustaf Otto Stenbock didn't partake in negotiations and sacked the city few days later.

Some sources claim both Transylvanians and their allies took part in sacking Warsaw, on the same day as city's capitulation took place. Warsaw was described as being disturbed by "hordes of Magyars, Vlachs and Cossacks" while residents of the city are going through cycle of chaos and destruction. In contemporary accounts, Warsaw was believed to have surrendered without a fight. German Lutheran garrison commander defected to the Swedish side, despite being entrusted by Stefan Czarniecki to defend Warsaw.

== Aftermath ==
On 23 June, after temporary occupation, Rákóczi left devastated Warsaw and headed to Łowicz. However, situation didn't get easier for Rákóczi from then on. Bohdan Khmelnytsky ordered Zhdanovych to withdraw with his Cossacks. Some attribute the Cossack withdrawal to mutiny instigated by Russian informers. Sweden withdrew due to being tied up by fighting Austria, Denmark and the Holy Roman Empire. Hungarians suffered a crushing defeat after getting encircled by the Crimean Tatars. As a result, Transylvanian Prince Rákóczi was effectively abandoned by his allies, with the Transylvanian army doomed to suffer heavy defeats in the upcoming month.

== Bibliography ==
- Kubala, Ludwik (1910). Wojna Brandenburska i najazd Rakoczego w roku 1656 i 1657 (in Polish). Legare Street Press. ISBN 1021496057.
- Markowicz, Marcin (2011). Najazd Rakoczego na Polskę 1657 (in Polish). Wydawn. inforteditions. ISBN 9788389943750.
