= Vloshchov Uezd =

Uezd in Kielce Governorate, Russian Empire

Vloshchov uezd Влощовский уезд
- Uezd
- Location in the Kielce Governorate
- Country: Russian Empire
- Governorate: Kielce
- Established: 1837
- Abolished: 1919
- Capital: Vloshchov

Area
  - Total: 1,386.16 km^{2} (535.20 sq mi)

Population (1897)
  - Total: 74,437
  - Density: 53.700/km^{2} (139.08/sq mi)

The Vloshchov uezd (Russian: Влощовский уезд; Polish: Powiat włoszczowski) was one of the subdivisions of the Kielce Governorate of the Russian Empire. It was situated in the northwestern part of the governorate. Its administrative centre was Vloshchov.

== History ==
The uezd was formed in 1837 as part of the Kraków Voivodeship and later part of the Kraków Governorate, which was renamed to the Kielce Governorate in 1842. After 1844 it was part of the Radom Governorate, and since 1867 it was once again part of the Kielce Governorate when it was reestablished. In 1919, it was transformed into Włoszczowa County, Kielce Voivodeship, Poland.

== Demographics ==
At the time of the Russian Empire Census of 1897, the Vloshchov uezd had a population of 74,437. Of these, 3,724 people lived in the city of Vloshchov.

In the uezd, 89.1% spoke Polish, 10% Yiddish, 0.7% German, 0.2% Russian, and less than 0.1% spoke other languages as their native language.

Spoken languages	1897 Census	
Spoken languages	Number	%
Polish	66,325	89.1%
Yiddish	7,424	10.0%
German	526	0.7%
Russian	113	0.2%
Ukrainian	4	0.0%
Other	45	0.0%
Total	74,437	100%
