= Andreev Uezd =

Uezd in Kielce Governorate, Russian Empire

Andreev uezd Андреевский уезд
- Uezd
- Location in the Kielce Governorate
- Country: Russian Empire
- Governorate: Kielce
- Established: 1837
- Abolished: 1919
- Capital: Andreev

Area
  - Total: 1,269.85 km^{2} (490.29 sq mi)

Population (1897)
  - Total: 78,889
  - Density: 62.125/km^{2} (160.90/sq mi)

The Andreev uezd (Russian: Андреевский уезд; Polish: Powiat jędrzejowski) was one of the subdivisions of the Kielce Governorate of the Russian Empire. It was situated in the central part of the governorate. Its administrative centre was Andreev.

== History ==
The uezd was formed in 1837 as part of the Kraków Voivodeship and later part of the Kraków Governorate, which was renamed to the Kielce Governorate in 1842. After 1844 it was part of the Radom Governorate, and since 1867 it was once again part of the Kielce Governorate when it was reestablished. In 1919, it was transformed into Jędrzejów County, Kielce Voivodeship, Poland.

== Demographics ==
At the time of the Russian Empire Census of 1897, the Andreev uezd had a population of 78,889. Of these, 4,717 people lived in the city of Andreev.

In the uezd, 89% spoke Polish, 10.2% Yiddish, 0.5% Russian, 0.2% German, and 0.1% spoke other languages as their native language.

Spoken languages	1897 Census	
Spoken languages	Number	%
Polish	70,184	89.0%
Yiddish	8,082	10.2%
Russian	421	0.5%
German	129	0.2%
Ukrainian	39	0.0%
Other	34	0.0%
Total	78,889	100%
