= Kyeltsy Uezd =

Uezd in Kielce Governorate, Russian Empire

Kyeltsy uezd Келецкий уезд
- Uezd
- Location in the Kielce Governorate
- Country: Russian Empire
- Governorate: Kielce
- Established: 1837
- Abolished: 1919
- Capital: Kyeltsy

Area
  - Total: 1,907.96 km^{2} (736.67 sq mi)

Population (1897)
  - Total: 142,754
  - Density: 74.8202/km^{2} (193.783/sq mi)

The Kyeltsy uezd (Russian: Келецкий уезд; Polish: Powiat kielecki) was one of the subdivisions of the Kielce Governorate of the Russian Empire. It was situated in the northern part of the governorate. Its administrative centre was Kyeltsy.

== History ==
The uezd was formed in 1837 as part of the Kraków Voivodeship and later part of the Kraków Governorate, which was renamed to the Kielce Governorate in 1842. After 1844 it was part of the Radom Governorate, and since 1867 it was once again part of the Kielce Governorate when it was reestablished. In 1919, it was transformed into Kielce County, Kielce Voivodeship, Poland.

== Demographics ==
At the time of the Russian Empire Census of 1897, the Kyeltsy uezd had a population of 142,754. Of these, 23,178 people lived in the city of Kyeltsy and 6,178 lived in the city of Chęciny.

In the uezd, 83.7% spoke Polish, 12.8% Yiddish, 2.4% Russian, 0.7% German, 0.2% Ukrainian, 0.1% Latvian, and 0.1% spoke other languages as their native language.

Spoken languages	1897 Census	
Spoken languages	Number	%
Polish	119,482	83.7%
Yiddish	18,252	12.8%
Russian	3,459	2.4%
German	937	0.7%
Ukrainian	272	0.2%
Latvian	135	0.1%
Belarusian	14	0.0%
Other	203	0.1%
Total	142,754	100%
