= Stopnitsa Uezd =

Uezd in Kielce Governorate, Russian Empire

Stopnitsa uezd Стопницкий уезд
- Uezd
- Location in the Kielce Governorate
- Country: Russian Empire
- Governorate: Kielce
- Established: 1837
- Abolished: 1919
- Capital: Stopnitsa (until June 1915); Busko-Zdruy (until 1919)

Area
  - Total: 1,598.18 km^{2} (617.06 sq mi)

Population (1897)
  - Total: 130,470
  - Density: 81.637/km^{2} (211.44/sq mi)

The Stopnitsa uezd (Russian: Стопницкий уезд; Polish: Powiat stopnicki) was one of the subdivisions of the Kielce Governorate of the Russian Empire. It was situated in the eastern part of the governorate. Its administrative centre was Stopnitsa until 1915, when it was replaced with Busko-Zdruy.

== History ==
The uezd was formed in 1837 as part of the Kraków Voivodeship and later part of the Kraków Governorate, which was renamed to the Kielce Governorate in 1842. After 1844 it was part of the Radom Governorate, and since 1867 it was once again part of the Kielce Governorate when it was reestablished. In 1915, the Austrian occupation authorities moved the seat from Stopnitsa to Busko-Zdruy, changing the name of the district to Busko County. In 1919, it was transformed into Stopnica County, Kielce Voivodeship, Poland.

== Demographics ==
At the time of the Russian Empire Census of 1897, the Stopnitsa uezd had a population of 130,470. Of these, 4,420 people lived in the village of Stopnitsa and 6,888 lived in the city of Chmielnik.

In the uezd, 84.7% spoke Polish, 14.1% Yiddish, 0.6% Russian, 0.4% German, 0.1% Ukrainian and 0.1% spoke other languages as their native language.

Spoken languages	1897 Census	
Spoken languages	Number	%
Polish	110,500	84.7%
Yiddish	18,383	14.1%
Russian	823	0.6%
German	583	0.4%
Ukrainian	110	0.1%
Belarusian	10	0.0%
Other	61	0.0%
Total	130,470	100%
