= Pinchov Uezd =

Uezd in Kielce Governorate, Russian Empire

Pinchov uezd Пинчовский уезд
- Uezd
- Location in the Kielce Governorate
- Country: Russian Empire
- Governorate: Kielce
- Established: 1837
- Abolished: 1919
- Capital: Pinchov

Area
  - Total: 1,154.22 km^{2} (445.65 sq mi)

Population (1897)
  - Total: 107,495
  - Density: 93.1322/km^{2} (241.211/sq mi)

The Pinchov uezd (Russian: Пинчовский уезд; Polish: Powiat pińczowski) was one of the subdivisions of the Kielce Governorate of the Russian Empire. It was situated in the southeastern part of the governorate. Its administrative centre was Pinchov.

== History ==
The uezd was formed in 1837 as part of the Kraków Voivodeship and later part of the Kraków Governorate, which was renamed to the Kielce Governorate in 1842. After 1844 it was part of the Radom Governorate, and since 1867 it was once again part of the Kielce Governorate when it was reestablished. In 1919, it was transformed into Pińczów County, Kielce Voivodeship, Poland.

== Demographics ==
At the time of the Russian Empire Census of 1897, the Pinchov uezd had a population of 107,495. Of these, 9,075 people lived in the city of Pinchov and 4,606 lived in the city of Działoszyce.

In the uezd, 86.1% spoke Polish, 12.7% Yiddish, 0.9% Russian, 0.2% Ukrainian, and 0.1% spoke other languages as their native language.

Spoken languages	1897 Census	
Spoken languages	Number	%
Polish	92,555	86.1%
Yiddish	13,677	12.7%
Russian	1,018	0.9%
Ukrainian	170	0.2%
German	34	0.0%
Other	41	0.0%
Total	107,495	100%
