= Subdivisions of Congress Poland =

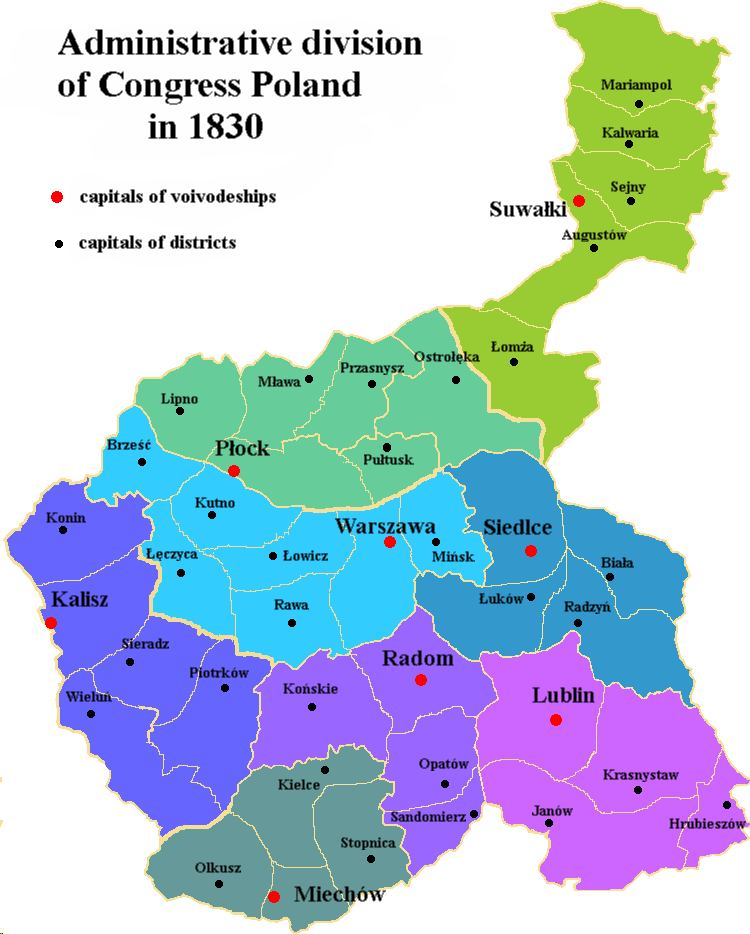
Administrative division of Congress Poland in 1830. This map represents the period 1816-1837 and is mostly valid for the period of up to 1844.

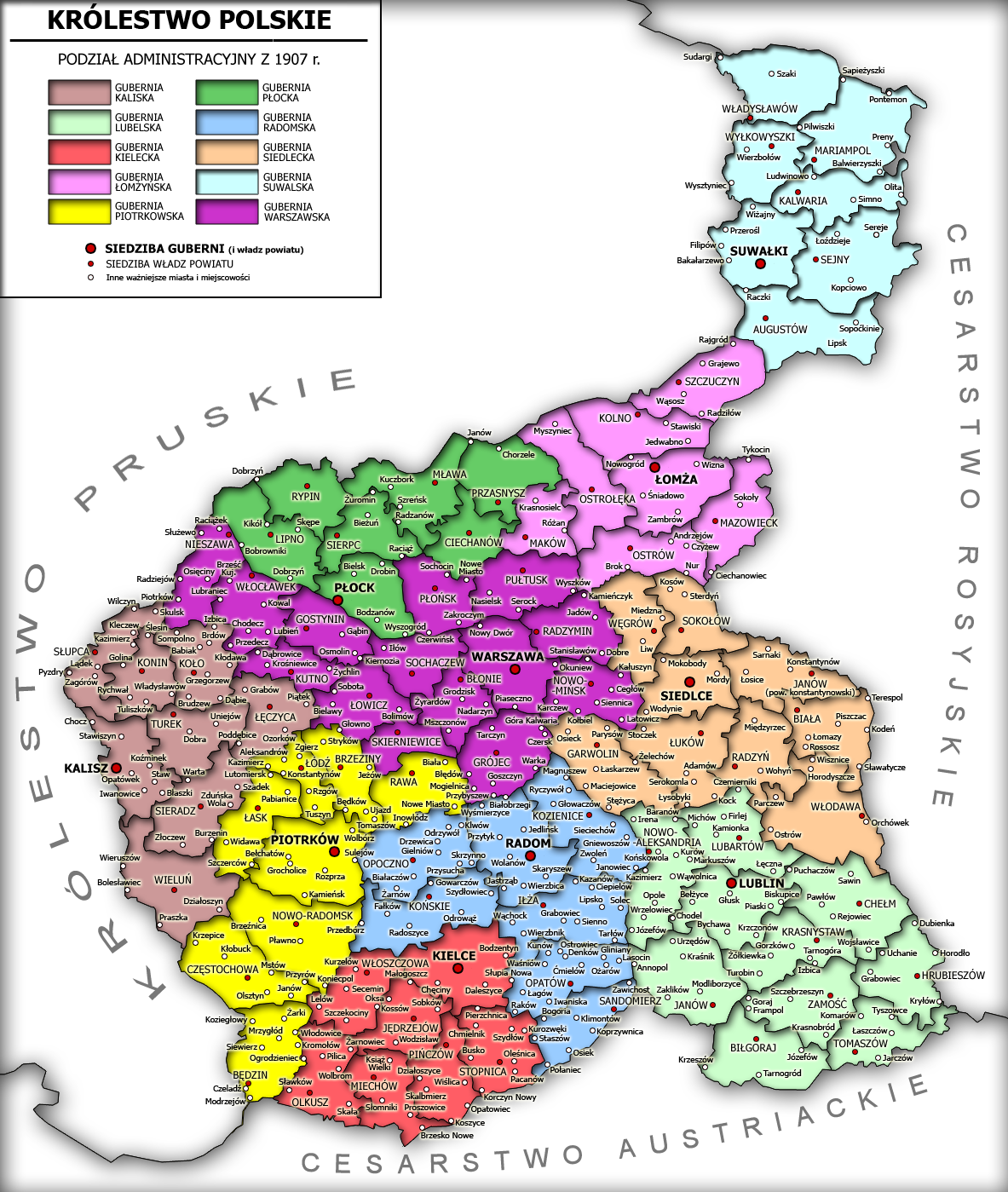
Administrative division of Congress Poland, 1907. This map represents the period 1893-1912, and is mostly valid for the most part for 1867-1914.

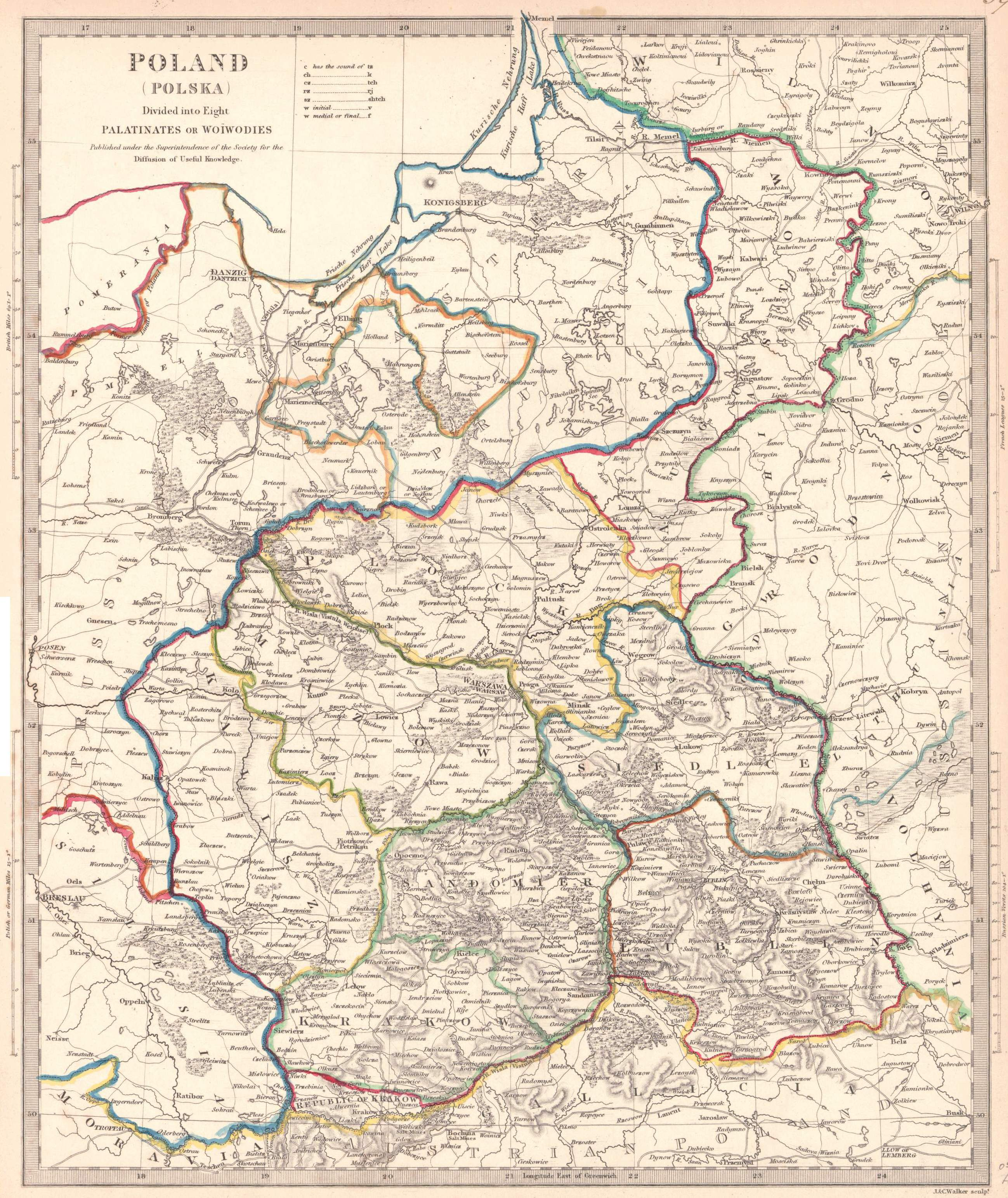
Historical map showing the administrative division of Congress Poland, 1831.

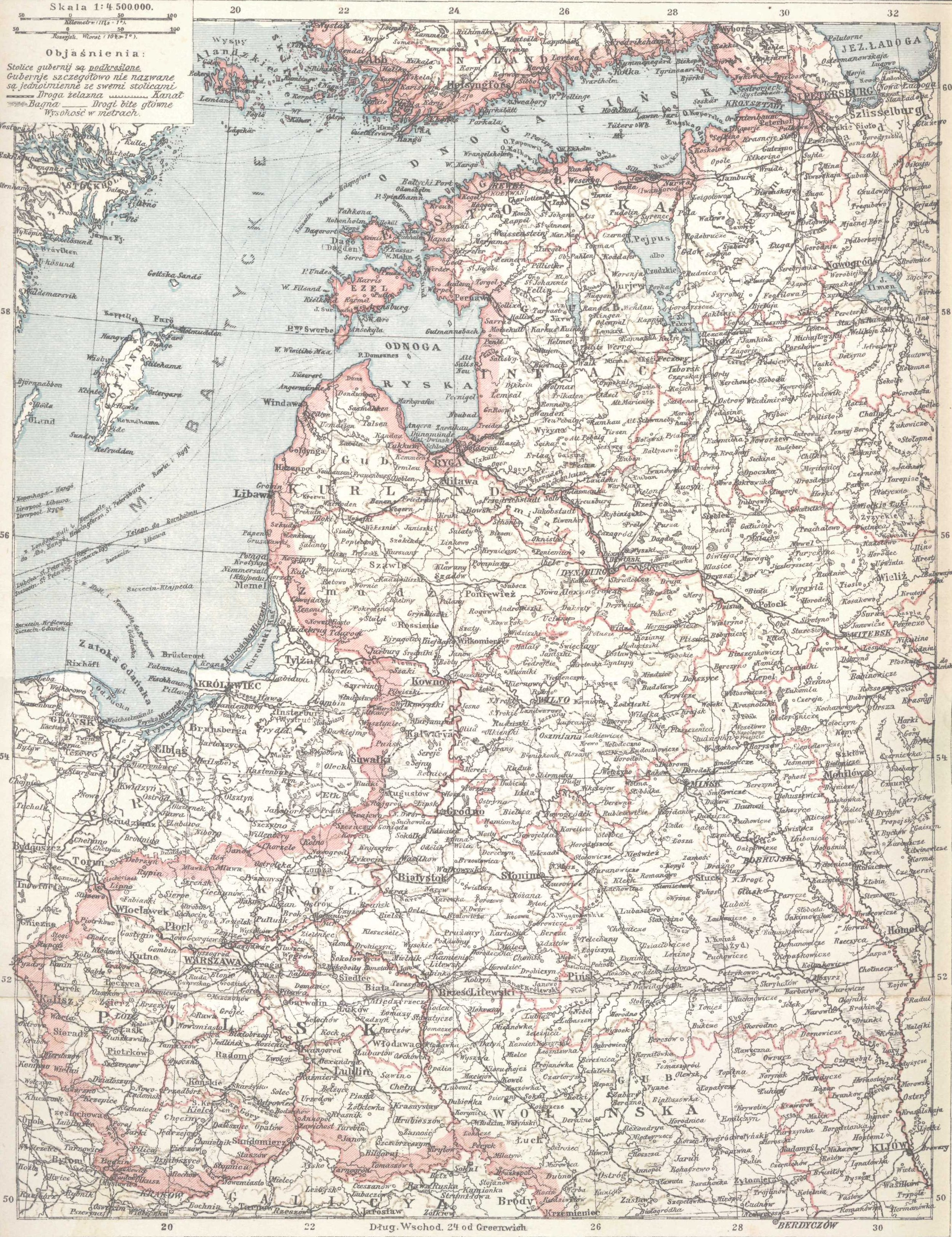
Historical map showing the Western governorates of the Russian Empire, 1902 (including those of Congress Poland).

Congress Poland was subdivided several times from its creation in 1815 until its dissolution in 1918. Congress Poland ("Russian Poland") was divided into departments, a relic from the times of the French-dominated Duchy of Warsaw. In 1816 the administrative divisions were changed to forms that were more traditionally Polish: voivodeships, obwóds and powiats. Following the November Uprising, the subdivisions were again changed in 1837 to bring the subdivisions closer to the structure of the Russian Empire when guberniyas (governorates) were introduced. In this way, Congress Poland was gradually transformed into the "Vistulan Country". Over the next several decades, various smaller reforms were carried out, either changing the smaller administrative units or merging/splitting various guberniyas.

== Subdivisions in modern Lithuania ==
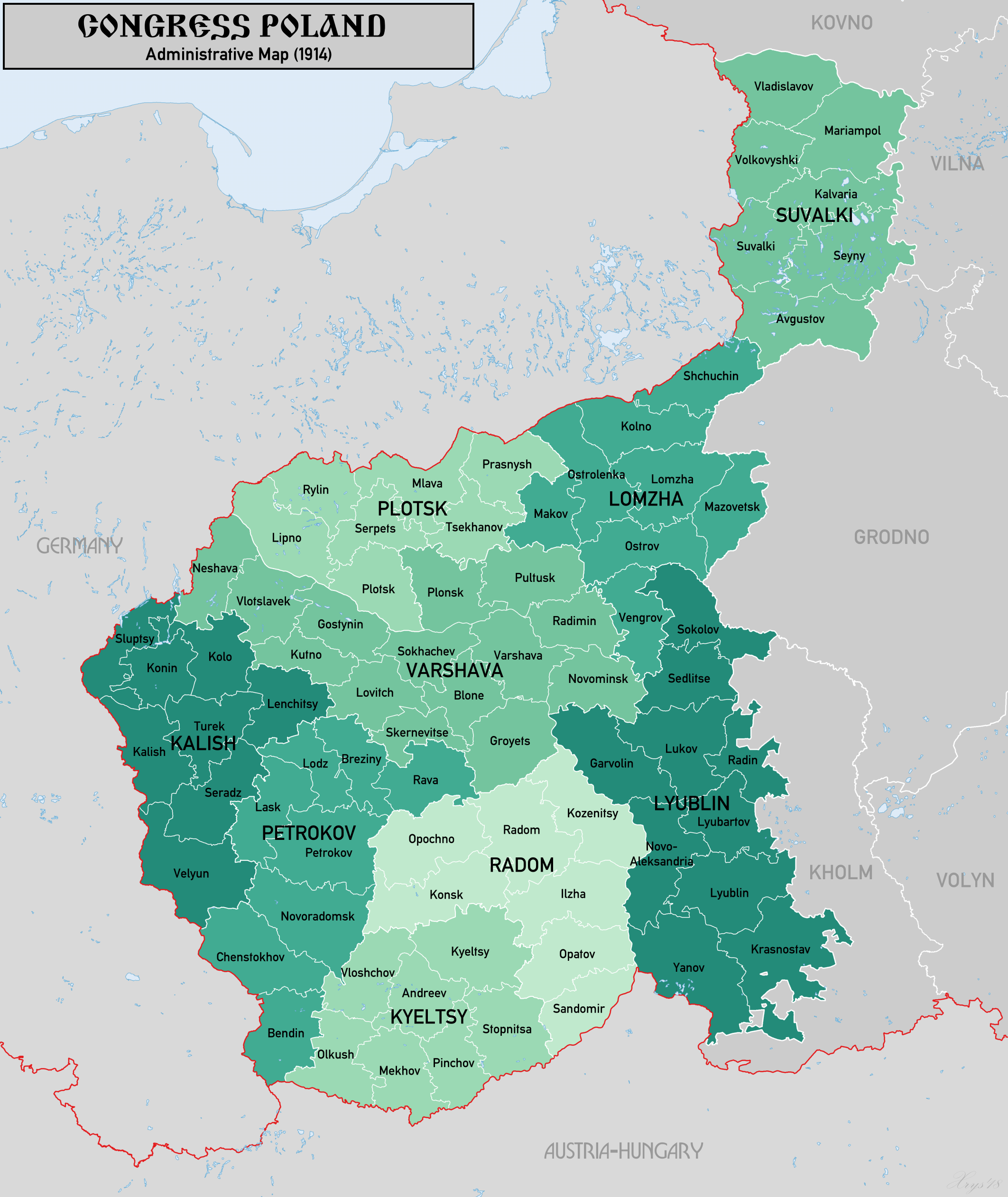
Congress Poland in 1914

Today, almost all of the subdivisions of Congress Poland may be found, in similar territorial areas, in modern Poland. A few, roughly in the northern panhandle of Congress Poland, are to be found in modern Lithuania. They are:

- In Marijampolė County: Kalvarija Municipality, Marijampolė Municipality, Šakiai District Municipality (formerly Vladislavov), Vilkaviškis District Municipality (formerly Volkovyshki), and the town of Kybartai
- In Alytus County: Alytus District Municipality (formerly part of Kalvaria district), Lazdijai District Municipality (formerly part of Seyny district), and Merkinė (formerly part of Seyny district), a town near the Dzūkija National Park

== Changes in subdivisions by period ==
=== From 1816 to 1837 ===
On January 16, 1816, the areas of administrative jurisdiction were reformed from the departments of the Duchy of Warsaw into the more traditionally Polish voivodeships, obwóds and powiats. Eight voivodeships were created:

- Augustów Voivodeship (capital in Suwałki)
- Kalisz Voivodeship
- Kraków Voivodeship (despite the name of this province, the city of Kraków was not included; Kraków was a free city until the Kraków Uprising of 1846, after which it was annexed by Austria; the capital was first Miechów, then Kielce).
- Lublin Voivodeship
- Masovian Voivodeship (capital in Warsaw)
- Płock Voivodeship
- Podlaskie Voivodeship (capital in Siedlce)
- Sandomierz Voivodeship (capital in Radom)

=== From 1837 to 1842 ===
On 7 March 1837 the voivodeships were reorganised as eight guberniyas (governorates):

- Augustów Governorate (with capital in Łomża)
- Kalisz Governorate (with capital in Kalisz)
- Krakov Governorate (with capital in Kielce)
- Lublin Governorate (with capital in Lublin)
- Masovia Governorate (with capital in Warsaw)
- Plotsk Governorate (with capital in Płock)
- Podlyase Governorate (with capital in Siedlce)
- Sandomir Governorate (with capital in Radom)

=== From 1842 to 1844 ===
In 1842 the Polish powiats were renamed to okręgs and the Polish obwóds were renamed powiats.

=== From 1844 to 1867 ===
In 1844 several governorates were merged with others, and some others renamed. Five governorates remained:

Governorate	Name in Russian	Name in Polish	Seat
Warsaw Governorate	Варшавская губерния	Gubernia warszawska	Warsaw
Augustów Governorate	Августовская губерния	Gubernia augustowska	Suwałki
Lublin Governorate	Люблинская губерния	Gubernia lubelska	Lublin
Płock Governorate	Плоцкая губерния	Gubernia płocka	Płock
Radom Governorate	Радомская губерния	Gubernia radomska	Radom

=== From 1867 to 1893 ===
The 1867 reform, initiated after the failure of the January Uprising, was designed to tie Congress Poland (now de facto the Vistulan Country) more tightly to the administration structure of the Russian Empire. It divided larger governorates into smaller ones. A new lower level entity, gmina, was introduced. This time ten governorates were formed:

Governorate	Name in Russian	Name in Polish	Seat
Warsaw Governorate	Варшавская губерния	Gubernia warszawska	Warsaw
Kalisz Governorate	Калишская губерния	Gubernia kaliska	Kalisz
Kielce Governorate	Келецкая губерния	Gubernia kielecka	Kielce
Łomża Governorate	Ломжинская губерния	Gubernia łomżyńska	Łomża
Lublin Governorate	Люблинская губерния	Gubernia lubelska	Lublin
Piotrków Governorate	Петроковская губерния	Gubernia piotrkowska	Piotrków
Płock Governorate	Плоцкая губерния	Gubernia płocka	Płock
Radom Governorate	Радомская губерния	Gubernia radomska	Radom
Siedlce Governorate	Седлецкая губерния	Gubernia siedlecka	Siedlce
Suwalki Governorate	Сувалкская губерния	Gubernia suwalska	Suwałki

=== From 1893 to 1912 ===
A minor reform of 1893 transferred some territory from the Plotsk and Lomzha Governorates to the Warsaw Governorate.

Governorate	Name in Russian	Name in Polish	Seat	Area, in thousands of km^{2}	Population, in thousands,(1905)
Warsaw Governorate	Варшавская губерния	Gubernia warszawska	Warsaw	17,6	2233
Kalisz Governorate	Калишская губерния	Gubernia kaliska	Kalisz	11,3	964
Kielce Governorate	Келецкая губерния	Gubernia kielecka	Kielce	10,2	899
Łomża Governorate	Ломжинская губерния	Gubernia łomżyńska	Łomża	10,6	645
Lublin Governorate	Люблинская губерния	Gubernia lubelska	Lublin	16,9	1341
Piotrków Governorate	Петроковская губерния	Gubernia piotrkowska	Piotrków	12,2	1640
Płock Governorate	Плоцкая губерния	Gubernia płocka	Płock	9,4	613
Radom Governorate	Радомская губерния	Gubernia radomska	Radom	12,4	917
Siedlce Governorate	Седлецкая губерния	Gubernia siedlecka	Siedlce	14,3	894
Suwalki Governorate	Сувалкская губерния	Gubernia suwalska	Suwałki	12,4	629

=== From 1912 to 1919 ===
The 1912 reform created a new governorate – Kholm Governorate – from parts of the Sedlets and Lublin Governorates. However this was split off from the Vistulan Country and made part of the Southwestern Krai of the Russian Empire.
