= Olkush Uezd =

Uezd in Kielce Governorate, Russian Empire

Olkush uezd Олькушский уезд
- Uezd
- Location in the Kielce Governorate
- Country: Russian Empire
- Governorate: Kielce
- Established: 1837
- Abolished: 1919
- Capital: Olkush

Area
  - Total: 1,405.96 km^{2} (542.84 sq mi)

Population (1897)
  - Total: 113,540
  - Density: 80.756/km^{2} (209.16/sq mi)

The Olkush uezd (Russian: Олькушский уезд; Polish: Powiat olkuski) was one of the subdivisions of the Kielce Governorate of the Russian Empire. It was situated in the southwestern part of the governorate. Its administrative centre was Olkush.

== History ==
The uezd was formed in 1837 as part of the Kraków Voivodeship and later part of the Kraków Governorate, which was renamed to the Kielce Governorate in 1842. After 1844 it was part of the Radom Governorate, and since 1867 it was once again part of the Kielce Governorate when it was reestablished. In 1919, it was transformed into Olkusz County, Kielce Voivodeship, Poland.

== Demographics ==
At the time of the Russian Empire Census of 1897, the Olkush uezd had a population of 113,540. Of these, 3,441 people lived in the city of Olkush.

In the uezd, 88.9% spoke Polish, 10.1% Yiddish, 0.6% Russian, 0.2% Ukrainian, 0.1% German, and 0.1% spoke other languages as their native language.

| Spoken languages | 1897 Census | |
| Spoken languages | Number | % |
|---|---|---|
| Polish | 100,892 | 88.9% |
| Yiddish | 11,433 | 10.1% |
| Russian | 726 | 0.6% |
| Ukrainian | 276 | 0.2% |
| German | 133 | 0.1% |
| Belarusian | 23 | 0.0% |
| Latvian | 4 | 0.0% |
| Other | 53 | 0.0% |
| Total | 113,540 | 100% |
