= Subdivisions of the Polish–Lithuanian territories following the partitions =

Territories of the Polish-Lithuanian Commonwealth during Partitions
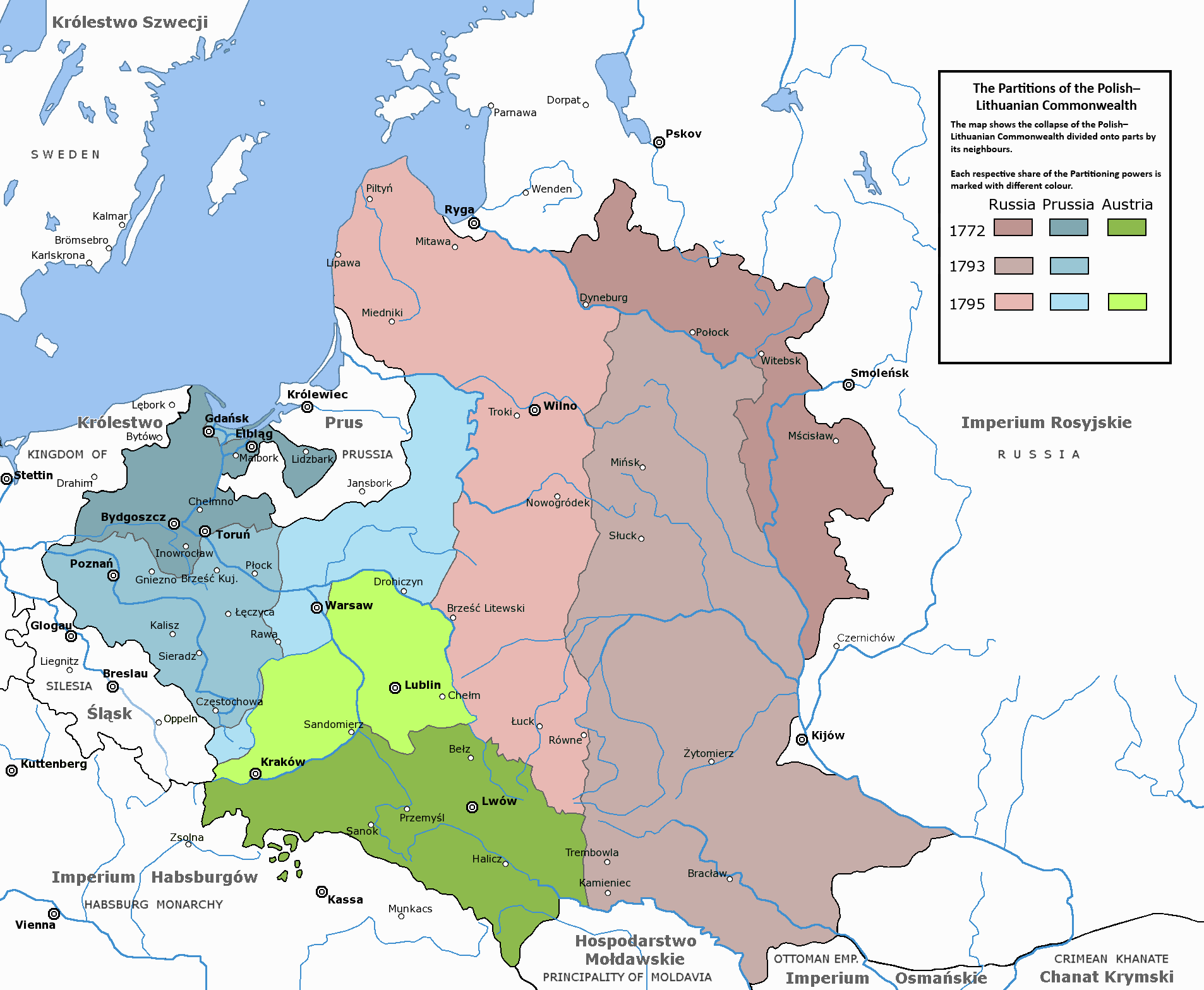
- The three Partitions of Poland 1772–1795
- End of the Commonwealth
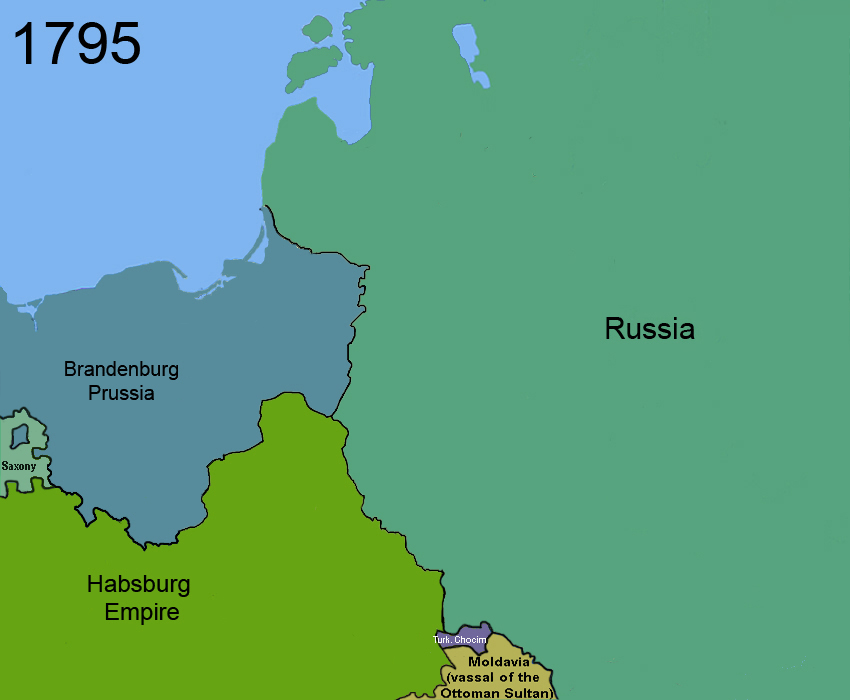
- Disappearance of Poland from the map of Europe

Territorial losses
- Total losses: 741,000 km^{2}
- To Prussia: 149,000 km² with 2.6 million people
- To Russia: 462,000 km² with 3.5 million people
- To Austria: 130,000 km² with 3.85 million people

Following three consecutive partitions of Poland carried out between 1772 and 1795, the sovereign state known as the Polish–Lithuanian Commonwealth disappeared from the map of Europe. In 1918 following the end of World War I, the territories of the former state re-emerged as the states of Poland and Lithuania among others. In the intervening period, the territory of the former Polish–Lithuanian Commonwealth was split between the Austrian Empire, the Kingdom of Prussia and the Russian Empire. These powers subdivided the territories that they gained and created new toponyms for the territories conquered. The subdivisions created were complicated by changes within those empires as well as by the periodic establishment of other forms of the quasi-Polish provinces led by a foreign head of state.

The below subdivisions do not cover the administrative divisions of the French vassal state created by Napoleon - the Duchy of Warsaw. See subdivisions of the Duchy of Warsaw (1807–1815). For the administrative division of the Polish-Lithuanian Commonwealth before its final third partition, see subdivisions of the Polish–Lithuanian Commonwealth. For the subdivisions of the lands awarded to the Russian Empire, see subdivisions of Congress Poland (1815–1918) and History of the administrative division of Russia. For subdivisions of the lands awarded to the Kingdom of Prussia, see Provinces of Prussia.

== Austrian Partition ==
The Austrian Empire, known from the second half of the 19th century as the Austro-Hungarian Empire, annexed territories of the former Polish–Lithuanian Commonwealth in the First Partition (1772) and the Third Partition (1795). The territories obtained were subdivided into:

1. Kingdom of Galicia and Lodomeria. These lands were held from 1772 to 1918.
2. West Galicia (also known as New Galicia). These lands were held from 1795 to 1809.
3. Free City of Cracow. Administered as a protectorate by the three powers from 1815 to 1846. Annexed by the Austrian Empire in 1846 as the Grand Duchy of Cracow. While nominally independent within the crown lands, it was de facto administered as part of the Kingdom of Galicia and Lodomeria until 1918.

In the First Partition, the Austrian Empire received the largest share of the Polish population, and second largest land share (83,000 km^{2} and over 2.65 million people). Austria did not participate in the Second partition. In the Third Partition, Austria annexed 47,000 km^{2} of territories with 1.2 million people. Overall, Austria gained about 18 percent of the former Commonwealth's territory (130,000 km^{2}) and about 32 percent of its population (3.85 million people). From the geographical perspective, much of the Austrian partition corresponded to the Galicia region.

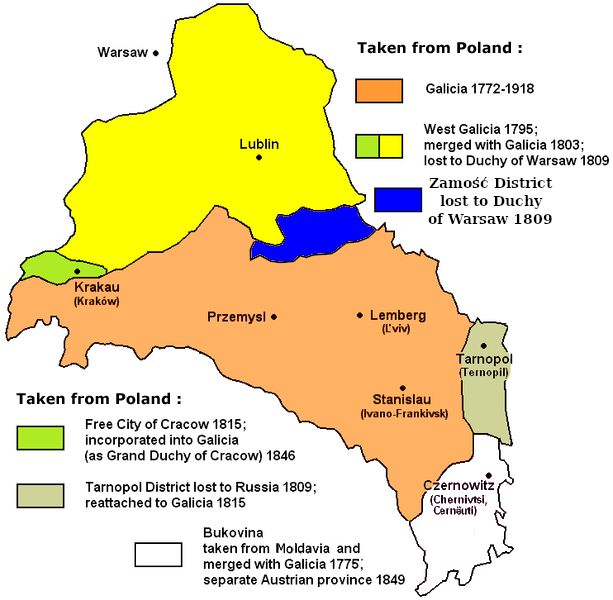
Territorial changes of Austrian Galicia, 1772-1918

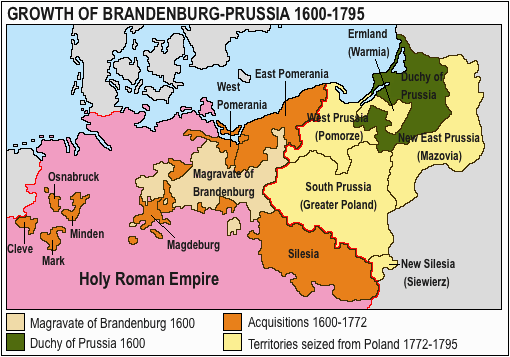
Growth of Prussia. Yellow territories are the ones gained during partitions of Poland

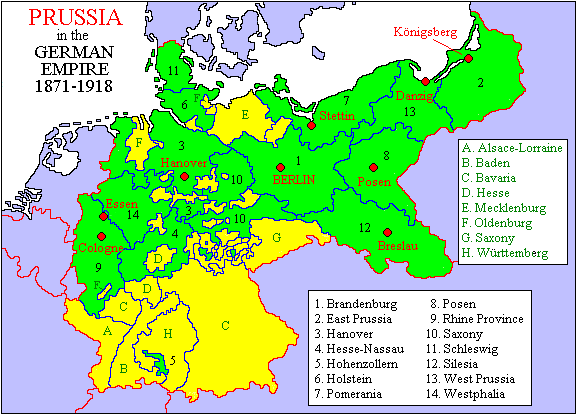
German Empire (1871–1918)

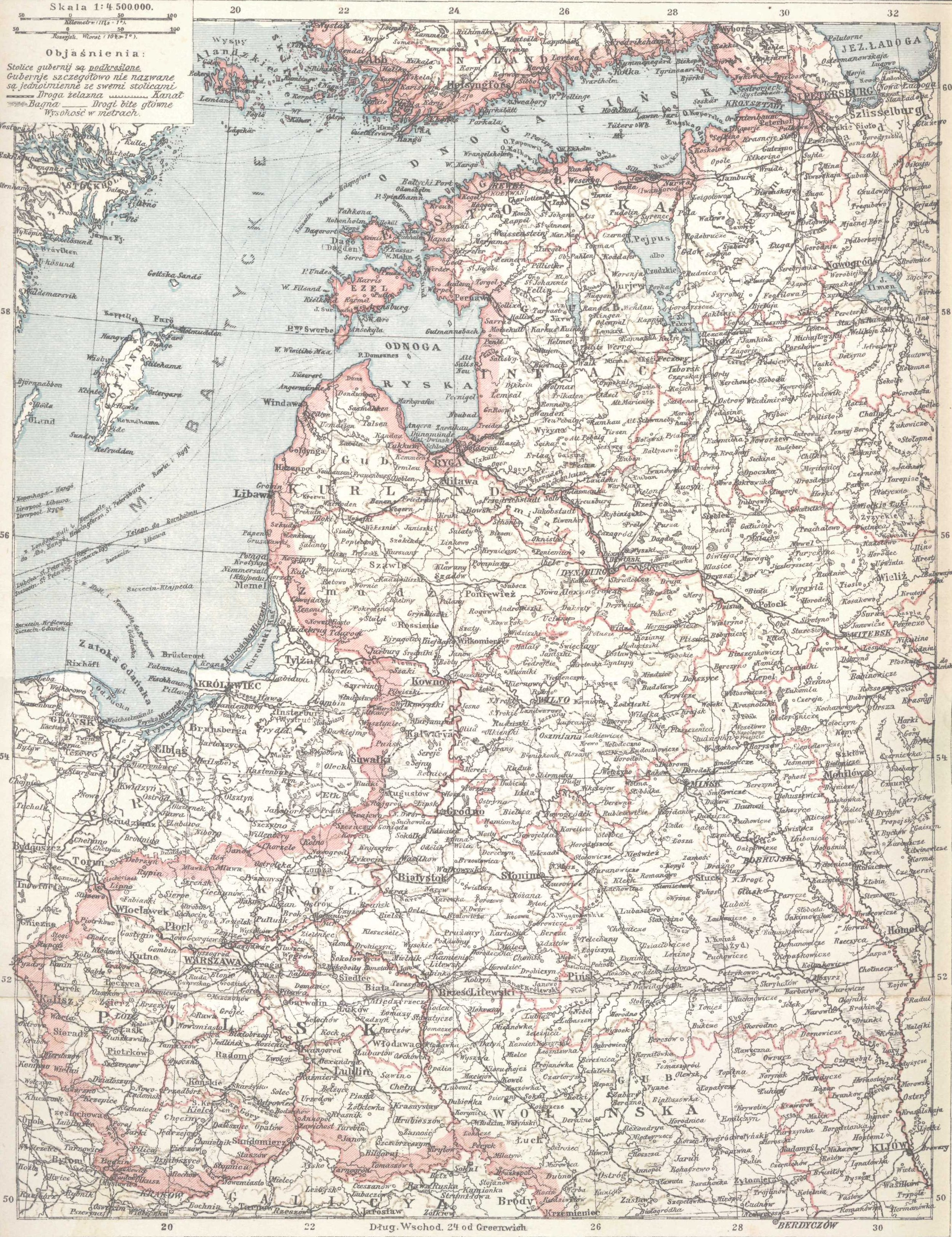
Western governorates of the Russian Empire.

== Prussian Partition ==
The Kingdom of Prussia (which became the dominant state of the German Empire upon its formation in 1871) annexed territories of the former Polish–Lithuanian Commonwealth in all three partitions. The territories obtained were subdivided into the following.

1. Netze District - from 1772 to 1793
2. New Silesia - from 1795 to 1807
3. New East Prussia - from 1795 to 1807
4. South Prussia - from 1793 to 1806
5. East Prussia - from 1773 to 1829
6. West Prussia - from 1773 to 1824.

In the First Partition, Prussia has received 36,000 km^{2} and about 0.6 million people. In the second partition, Prussia had received 58,000 km^{2} and about 1 million people. In the third, similar to the second, Prussia gained 55,000 km^{2} and 1 million people. Overall, Prussia had gained about 20 percent of the former Commonwealth territory (149 000 km^{2}) and about 23 percent of the population (2.6 million people). From the geographical perspective, much of the territories annexed by Prussia formed the province of Greater Poland (Wielkopolska).

== Russian Partition ==
The Russian Empire which acquired the territories of the Kingdom of Poland, the Grand Duchy of Lithuania and the Duchy of Courland and Semigallia in all three Partitions, divided the former territories of the Commonwealth by either creating or enlarging the following guberniyas.

1. Belarus Governorate (1802)
2. Bratslav Governorate
3. Chernigov Governorate
4. Kiev Governorate (1708)
5. Lithuania Governorate (1795), later split into Lithuania-Grodno Governorate and Lithuania-Vilna Governorate, the last one later split into Vilna and Kovno Governorates
6. Minsk Governorate (1793)
7. Mogilev Governorate (1772)
8. Podolia Governorate (1773)
9. Polotsk Governorate
10. Pskov Governorate
11. Slonim Governorate (1795) (several months after creation connected to Lithuania Governorate in and split off from it in 1801 as Lithuania-Grodno Governorate)
12. Volhynia Governorate (1793)

After the Congress of Vienna in 1815, the Russian Empire created a separate entity called Congress Poland. See administrative division of Congress Poland for details. Territories in the Russian partition which were not incorporated into Congress Poland were known as the Western Krai (combination of Northwestern and Southwestern Krais), and in Poland as the taken lands (Polish: ziemie zabrane).

The Western Krai comprised the following lands of the Commonwealth:

1. from the first partition of Poland (1772): Polish Inflants (Latgale), the northern part of the Polotsk Voivodeship, the entire Mstsislaw Voivodeship and Vitebsk Voivodeships, and the southeastern part of the Minsk Voivodeship (about 92,000 km^{2})
2. from the second partition of Poland (1793): the remaining part of the Minsk Voivodeship, the entire Kiev Voivodeship, Bracław Voivodeship and Vilnius Voivodeships, parts of Podole Voivodeship and eastern parts of the Wołyń Voivodeship and Brest Litovsk Voivodeships (about 250,000 km^{2})
3. from the third partition of Poland (1795): all the territories east of the Bug River(about 120,000. km^{2}) and after 1807 the Belostok Oblast)

It consisted of 9 guberniyas: six Belarusian and Lithuania ones that constituted the Northwestern Krai (Vilna Governorate, Kovno Governorate, Grodno Governorate, Minsk Governorate, Mogilev Governorate and Vitebsk Governorate) and three Ukrainian ones that constituted the Southwestern Krai (Volhynia Governorate, Podolia Governorate and Kiev Governorate).

The Duchy of Courland and Semigallia was transformed into Courland Governorate (Government of Courland) and grouped with the Baltic governorates also known as Governments of Ostsee.

In the first partition, Russia gained 92,000 square kilometres (36,000 sq mi) and 1.3 million people. In the second, 250,000 km^{2} and 1 million people. In the third, 120,000 km^{2} and 1.2 million people. Overall, Russia had gained about 62 percent of the former Commonwealth territory (462,000 km^{2}) and about 45 percent of the population (3.5 million people).

During World War I (1914–1918), much of the territories became occupied by the Central Powers (primarily, German Empire) and became administered by the Ober Ost.
