= Mekhov Uezd =

Uezd in Kielce Governorate, Russian Empire

Mekhov uezd Меховский уезд
- Uezd
- Location in the Kielce Governorate
- Country: Russian Empire
- Governorate: Kielce
- Established: 1837
- Abolished: 1919
- Capital: Mekhov

Area
  - Total: 1,370.68 km^{2} (529.22 sq mi)

Population (1897)
  - Total: 114,410
  - Density: 83.470/km^{2} (216.19/sq mi)

The Mekhov uezd (Russian: Меховский уезд; Polish: Powiat miechowski) was one of the subdivisions of the Kielce Governorate of the Russian Empire. It was situated in the southern part of the governorate. Its administrative centre was Mekhov.

== History ==
The uezd was formed in 1837 as part of the Kraków Voivodeship and later part of the Kraków Governorate, which was renamed to the Kielce Governorate in 1842. After 1844, it was part of the Radom Governorate, and since 1867, it was once again part of the Kielce Governorate when it was reestablished. In 1919, it was transformed into Miechów County, Kielce Voivodeship, Poland.

== Demographics ==
At the time of the Russian Empire Census of 1897, the Mekhov uezd had a population of 114,410. Of these, 4,175 people lived in the city of Mekhov.

In the uezd, 93.4% spoke Polish, 5% Yiddish, 1.2% Russian, 0.2% Ukrainian, 0.1% German, and 0.1% spoke other languages as their native language.

Spoken languages	1897 Census	
Spoken languages	Number	%
Polish	106,834	93.4%
Yiddish	5,766	5.0%
Russian	1,423	1.2%
Ukrainian	217	0.2%
German	86	0.1%
Belarusian	13	0.0%
Other	71	0.1%
Total	114,410	100%
