= History of the administrative division of Russia =

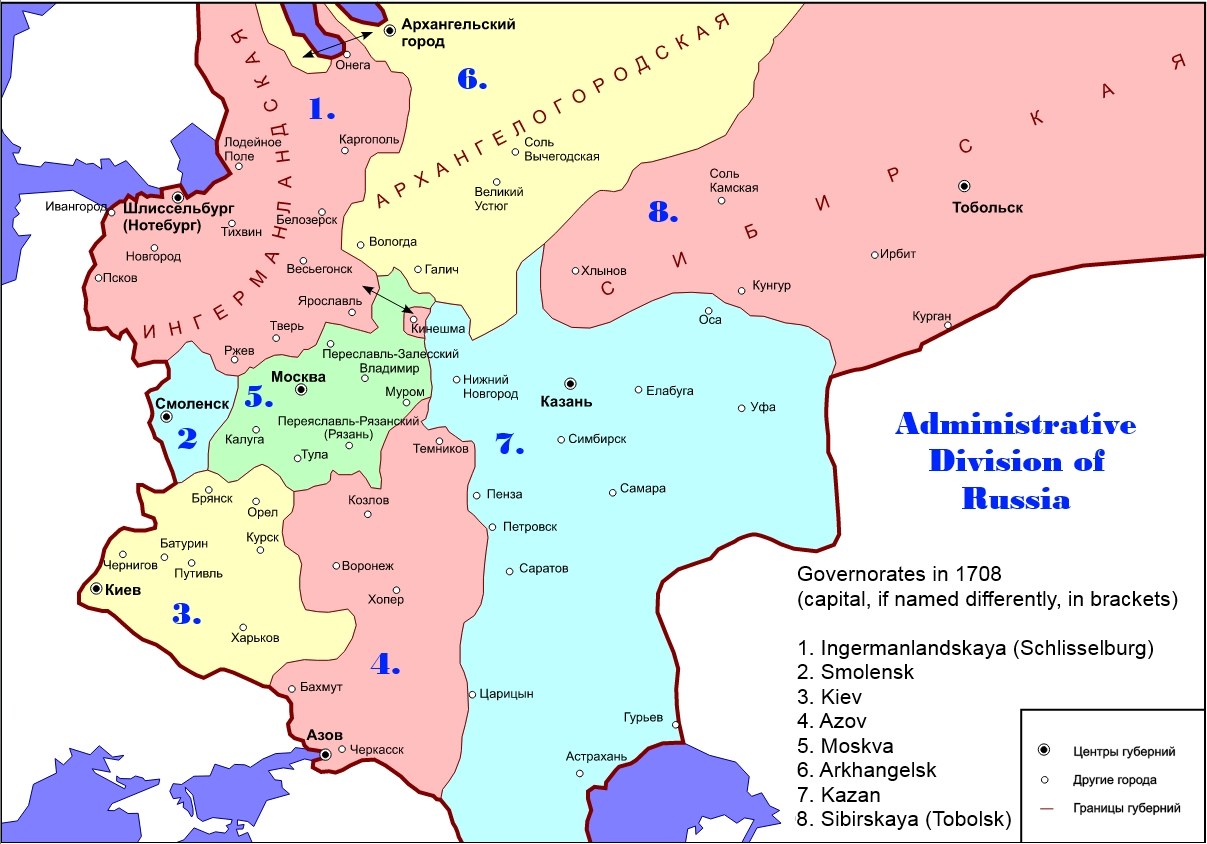
The first eight guberniyas established in 1708

The modern administrative-territorial structure of Russia is a system of territorial organization which is a product of a centuries-long evolution and reforms.

== Early history ==
The Kievan Rus' as it formed in the 10th century remained a more or less unified realm under the rule of Yaroslav the Wise (d. 1054), but in the later part of the 11th century, it disintegrated into a number of de facto independent and rivaling principalities, the most important of which were Galicia–Volhynia, the Novgorod Republic, and Vladimir-Suzdal.

Following the advance of the Mongols and the establishment of the Golden Horde in 1240, many parts of the former Kievan Rus' came under the direct administration of Sarai, while others became its dependencies. The Kingdom of Galicia–Volhynia became part of the Grand Duchy of Lithuania, and later gradually and completely coming under the direct administration of the Crown of Poland. The Novgorod Republic was annexed by the Grand Duchy of Moscow. The grand duchies of Lithuania and Moscow practically divided the former territories of Kievan Rus' between each other, both struggling to gain the seat of the Metropolitan of Kiev.

From the 13th century, the Russian principalities used an administrative subdivision into uyezds, with each such uyezd being subdivided into several volosts, some areas used division of pyatina. Voivodes were the officials appointed to administer and defend the uyezds.

By the 15th century, the Grand Duchy of Moscow was recognized as a direct successor of the Grand Duchy of Vladimir. It gradually incorporated all left out adjacent smaller duchies such as the Principality of Yaroslavl, Principality of Rostov and successfully conquered the Principality of Nizhny Novgorod-Suzdal, the Principality of Tver as well as the Novgorod Republic. Near the end of the 15th century the Golden Horde fell apart into several smaller khanates and Muscovy for the first time became a sovereign state.

At the start of the 16th century, the Grand Duchy of Moscow managed to annex the Pskov Republic and conquer the Grand Duchy of Ryazan as well as secure number of territories that belonged to the Grand Duchy of Lithuania such as the Upper Oka Principalities and Sloboda Ukraine, thus extending its territory far south. In 1708, the Oka principalities and Sloboda Ukraine were incorporated into the first Kiev Governorate. During the second half of the 16th century, the Grand Duchy of Moscow managed to conquer number of West-Siberian and Volga duchies and khanates such as Kazan Khanate, Siberia Khanate, Astrakhan Khanate, Great Nogai Horde and many others. Some of the territorial acquisitions, however, were lost during the Time of Troubles.

Soon after the Time of Troubles (Treaty of Polyanovka), the Grand Duchy of Moscow was able to recover the Duchy of Smolensk (Smolensk Voivodeship) and later annex territory of Left-bank Ukraine (Truce of Andrusovo).

Prior to the 18th century, the Tsardom of Russia was divided into a system of territorial units called razryads (literally order of units) as part of military reform of 1680.

- Moscow Razryad
- Sevsk Razryad
- Vladimir Razryad
- Novgorod Razryad
- Kazan Razryad
- Smolensk Razryad
- Ryazan Razryad
- Belgorod Razryad, chartered in 1658 out of the Kiev Voivodeship
- Tambov Razryad
- Tula Razryad
- Tobol Razryad, chartered no later than 1587 (first known Voivodeship)
- Tom Razryad
- Yenisei Razryad

During the 1680s, the Tsardom of Russia acquired a substantial expansion in Transbaikal after signing the Treaty of Nerchinsk with China (Qing dynasty). By this time (at the end of the 17th century), an extensive territory from Yenisei to the Sea of Okhotsk was secured through colonization. The discovery of the Bering Strait in 1728 confirmed the eastern borders of modern Russia. The eastward advance through Siberia extended the Tobol Razryad transforming it into overstretched territory that was initially in 1708 included into Siberia Governorate.

== Imperial Russia ==
History of the
administrative
division of Russia
1708–1710
1710–1713
1713–1714
1714–1717
1717–1719
1719–1725
1725–1726
1726–1727
1727–1728
1728–1744
1744–1764

=== Administrative reforms by Peter the Great ===
Technically, the territorial-administrative reform started out in the Tsardom of Russia before the Imperial period. On December 29 [O.S. December 18], 1708, in order to improve the manageability of the vast territory of the state, Tsar Peter the Great issued an ukase (edict) dividing Russia into eight administrative divisions, called governorates (guberniyas), which replaced the 166 uyezds and razryads which existed before the reform:

- Archangelgorod Governorate
- Azov Governorate
- Ingermanland Governorate
- Kazan Governorate
- Kiev Governorate
- Moscow Governorate
- Siberia Governorate
- Smolensk Governorate

Governorates of the Russian Empire (1708-1726)
| 1708-1710 | Kazan | | Ingermanland | Azov | Smolensk |
| 1710-1713 | Kazan | | Saint Petersburg | Azov | Smolensk |
| 1713-1714 | Kazan | | Saint Petersburg | Azov | Moscow | Riga |
| 1714-1717 | | Nizhny Novgorod | Saint Petersburg | Azov | Moscow | Riga |
| 1717-1719 | Astrakhan | | Saint Petersburg | Azov | Moscow | Riga |
| 1719-1725 | Astrakhan | Nizhny Novgorod | Saint Petersburg | Azov | Moscow | Riga | Reval |
| 1725-1726 | Astrakhan | Nizhny Novgorod | Saint Petersburg | Voronezh | Moscow | Riga | Reval |
| 1726 | Astrakhan | Nizhny Novgorod | Saint Petersburg | Voronezh | Smolensk | | Reval |
The Governorates of Archangelgorod, Kiev and Siberia remained constant between 1708 and 1726.

The reform of 1708 established neither the borders of the governorates nor their internal divisions. The governorates were defined as the sets of cities and the lands adjacent to those cities. Some older subdivision types also continued to be used. Between 1710 and 1713, all governorates were subdivided into lots (Russian: доли), each governed by a landrat (ландрат). Every governorate was administered by an appointed governor, who also headed a board of landrats. The lots' primary purpose was fiscal, and each one was supposed to cover 5,536 homesteads.

In 1719, Peter enacted another administrative reform to fix the deficiencies of the original system, as the governorates were too big and unmanageable. This reform abolished the system of lots, dividing most of the governorates into provinces (провинции), which were further divided into districts (Russian: дистрикты).

During this time, territories were frequently reshuffled between the governorates, and new governorates were added to accommodate population growth and territorial expansion.

in 1721 the Russian Empire possessed a multinational population of about 17.5 million population in all administrative districts. Out of the 13.5 million Russians, 5.5 million men were liable to the poll tax; 3 percent of them were townsmen and 97 percent peasants. Of the peasants, 25 percent cultivated church lands, 19 percent state lands, and the remainder worked the estates of some 100,000 families of secular landowners. Russia’s territory of about 4,633,200 square miles (12,000,000 square km) included some recent and valuable acquisitions.

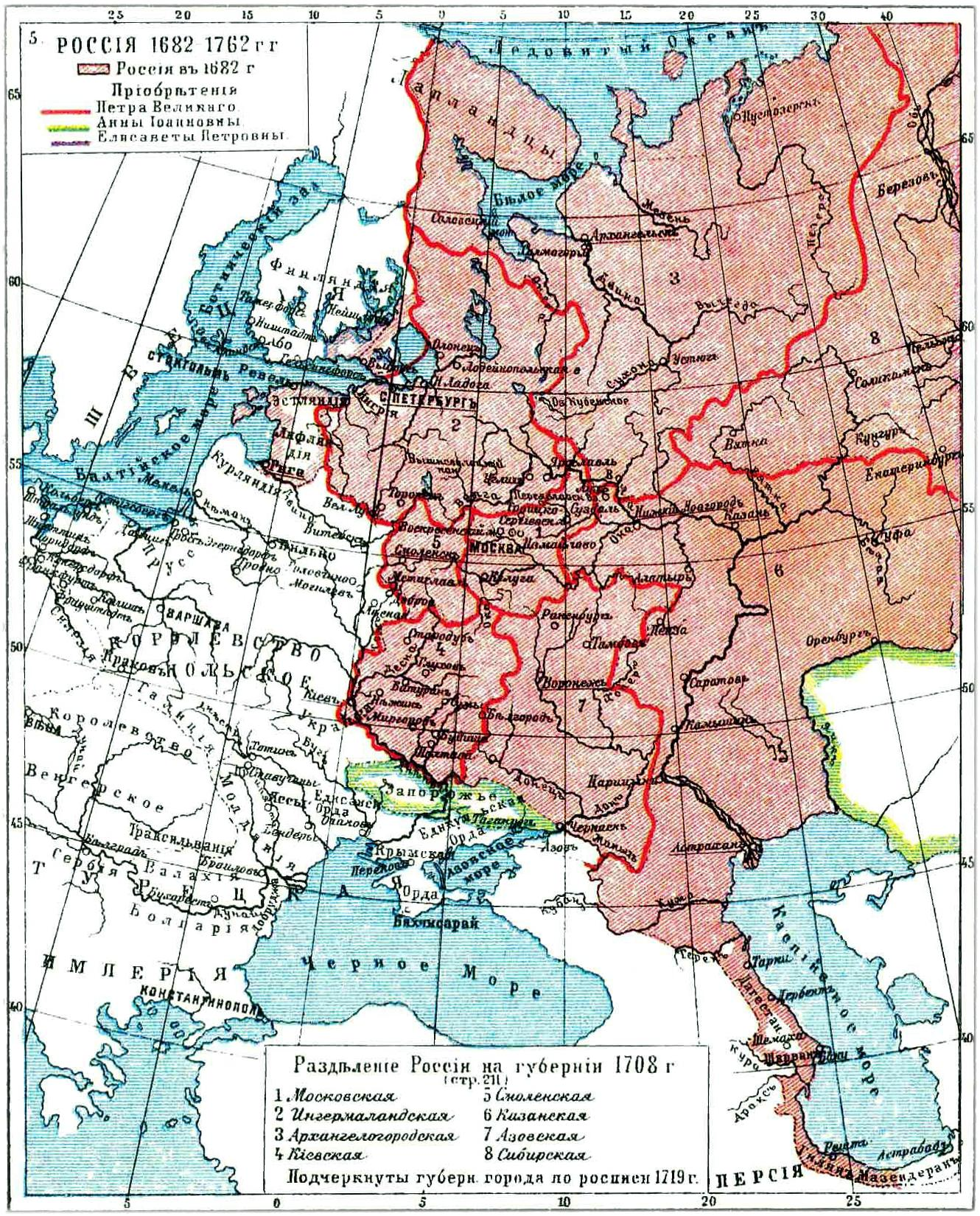
Russia in 1682–1762

=== Subsequent reforms ===
In 1727, soon after Peter the Great's death, Catherine I enacted another reform, which rolled back many of the previous reform's developments. The system of districts was abolished, and the old system of uyezds was restored. A total of 166 uyezds was re-established; together with the newly created uyezds, the Russian Empire had approximately 250.

The reform also reshuffled some territories. Narva Province was transferred from Saint Petersburg Governorate to Revel Governorate; Solikamsk and Vyatka Provinces were transferred from Siberia Governorate to Kazan Governorate; and Uglich and Yaroslavl Provinces were transferred from Saint Petersburg Governorate to Moscow Governorate. In addition, Belgorod, Oryol, and Sevsk Provinces of Kiev Governorate were reconstituted as Belgorod Governorate; and Belozersk, Novgorod, Pskov, Tver, and Velikiye Luki Provinces of Saint Petersburg Governorate were reconstituted as Novgorod Governorate.

The following years saw few changes. In 1728, Ufa Province was transferred from Kazan Governorate to Siberia Governorate, and in 1737, Simbirsk Province was created within Kazan Governorate.

=== Administrative reforms by Catherine the Great ===
By 1775, the existing system of administrative divisions proved inefficient, which was further underlined by Pugachev's Rebellion, and Catherine the Great issued a document known as Decree on the Governorates (Russian: Учреждение о губерниях). The second part of the same decree was issued in 1780, which, however, contained very few significant changes with respect to the first part.

A major administrative territorial restructuring of the Russian Empire after vast land acquisition from the Ottoman Empire and Polish–Lithuanian Commonwealth in the late 18th century. The reform saw introduction of the office of viceroy (gosudarev namestnik) which later were transformed into a general governor. Gosudarev namestnik literally means an imperial representative to the land. During the reform several already existing governments (guberniya) were combined under the office of the Russian viceroy and were called namestnichestvo. Those namestnichestvo were introduced onto the expanded territory as well, the only exclusion were the governments of Moscow and Saint Petersburg. In 1796 all namestnichetvo were officially renamed into general governments. General governments exercised a small degree of autonomy as certain laws varied from general government to another.

=== Reforms in the 19th century ===
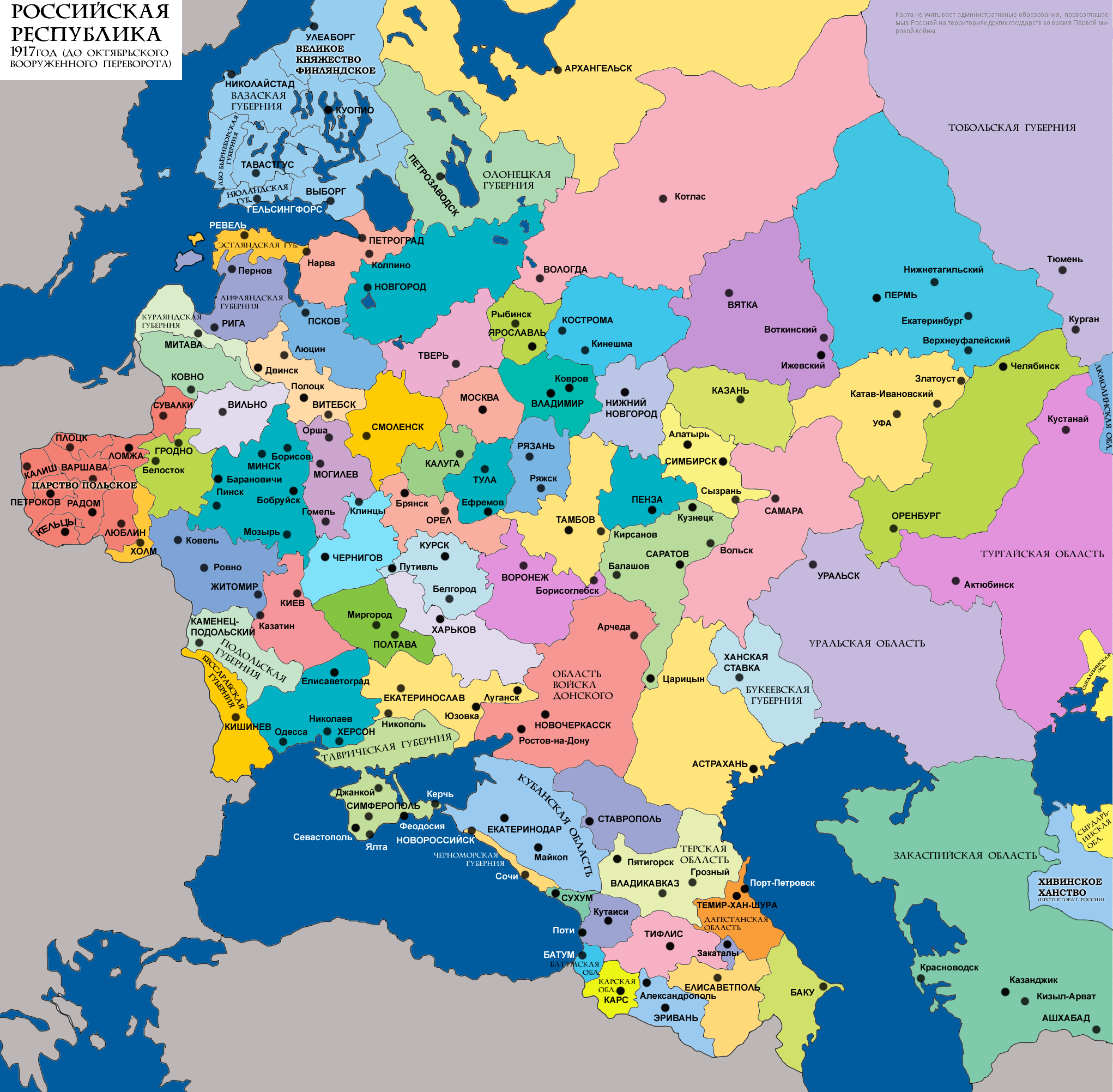
Western part of the Governorates of the Russian Empire on the eve of the Russian Revolution

Governorates of the Russian Empire on the eve of the Russian Revolution

After the abolition of Russian serfdom in 1861, volosts became a unit of peasant's local self-rule. A number of mirs were united into a typical volost, which had an assembly consisting of elected delegates from the mirs. The self-government of the mirs and volosts was tempered by the authority of the police commissaries (stanovoy) and by the power of general oversight given to the nominated "district committees for the affairs of the peasants".

=== Reforms in the 20th century ===
By the 1910s, 104 administrative governorate units existed.

Subdivisions of the Russian Empire, c. 1914
| Russian | | Anglicisation | Alternative Name(s) |
| Russian Cyrillic | Romanisation | Anglicisation | Alternative Name(s) |
European Russia or Ruthenia
Great Russia
Central or Muscovite Russia
| Московская губерния | Moskovskaya guberniya | Moscow Governorate | |
| Калужская губерния | Kaluzhskaya guberniya | Kaluga Governorate | |
| Смоленская губерния | Smolenskaya guberniya | Smolensk Governorate | |
| Тверская губерния | Tverskaya guberniya | Tver Governorate | |
| Ярославская губерния | Yaroslavskaya guberniya | Yaroslavl Governorate | |
| Костромская губерния | Kostromskaya guberniya | Kostroma Governorate | |
| Нижегородская губерния | Nizhegorodskaya guberniya | Nizhny Novgorod Governorate | |
| Владимирская губерния | Vladimirskaya guberniya | Vladimir Governorate | |
| Рязанская губерния | Ryazanskaya guberniya | Ryazan Governorate | |
| Тульская губерния | Tul'skaya guberniya | Tula Governorate | |
| Орловская губерния | Orlovskaya guberniya | Oryol Governorate | |
| Курская губерния | Kurskaya guberniya | Kursk Governorate | |
| Воронежская губерния | Voronezhskaya guberniya | Voronezh Governorate | |
| Тамбовская губерния | Tambovskaya guberniya | Tambov Governorate | |
Far North or Novgorodian Russia
| Архангельская губерния | Arkhangel'skaya guberniya | Arkhangelsk Governorate | |
| Олонецкая губерния | Olonetskaya guberniya | Olonets Governorate | |
| Санкт-Петербургская губерния | Sankt-Peterburgskaya guberniya | Saint Petersburg Governorate | Petrograd; formerly Swedish Ingria |
| Псковская губерния | Pskovskaya guberniya | Pskov Governorate | |
| Новгородская губерния | Novgorodskaya guberniya | Novgorod Governorate | Veliky Novgorod |
| Вологодская губерния | Vologodskaya guberniya | Vologda Governorate | |
Little Russia or the Zaporizhian Host
| Черниговская губерния | Chernigovskaya guberniya | Chernigov Governorate | Chernihiv |
| Полтавская губерния | Poltavskaya guberniya | Poltava Governorate | |
| Харьковская губерния | Khar'kovskaya guberniya | Kharkov Governorate | Kharkiv |
Northwestern Krai
| Ковенская губерния | Kovenskaya guberniya | Kovno Governorate | Kaunas, Kowno |
| Виленская губерния | Vilenskaya guberniya | Vilna Governorate | Vilnius, Wilno |
White Russia
| Витебская губерния | Vitebskaya guberniya | Vitebsk Governorate | Vitebskas, Witebsk, Vitsyebsk, Viciebsk, Vitebska |
| Могилевская губерния | Mogilevskaya guberniya | Mogilev Governorate | Mogiliauas, Mohylaw, Mahilioŭ |
Black Russia
| Минская губерния | Minskaya guberniya | Minsk Governorate | Minskas, Mińsk, Miensk |
| Гродненская губерния | Grodnenskaya guberniya | Grodno Governorate | Gardinas, Hrodna |
Southwestern Krai (Right-Bank Ukraine)
| Холмская губерния | Kholmskaya guberniya | Kholm Governorate | Chelmas, Chełm |
Red Russia
| Волынская губерния | Volynskaya guberniya | Volhynian Governorate | Volyn, Voluinė, Wołyń |
| Киевская губерния | Kiyevskaya guberniya | Kiev Governorate | Kyiv, Kijevas, Kijów |
| Подольская губерния | Podol'skaya guberniya | Podolia Governorate | Podolya, Podolien, Padole, Podil |
Golden Horde
Khanate of Kazan
| Пермская губерния | Permskaya guberniya | Perm Governorate | |
| Вятская губерния | Vyatkskaya guberniya | Vyatka Governorate | |
| Казанская губерния | Kazanskaya guberniya | Kazan Governorate | |
| Уфимская губерния | Ufimskaya guberniya | Ufa Governorate | |
| Оренбургская губерния | Orenburgskaya guberniya | Orenburg Governorate | |
| Самарская губерния | Samarskaya guberniya | Samara Governorate | |
| Симбирская губерния | Simbirskaya guberniya | Simbirsk Governorate | |
| Пензенская губерния | Penzenskaya guberniya | Penza Governorate | |
| Саратовская губерния | Saratovskaya guberniya | Saratov Governorate | |
| Астраханская губерния | Astrakhanskaya guberniya | Astrakhan Governorate | |
New Russia or Little Tartary
| Область Войска Донского | Oblast' Voiska Donskogo | Don Cossack Host | Donshchyna |
| Екатеринославская губерния | Yekaterinoslavskaya guberniya | Ekaterinoslav Governorate | Katerinoslav, Katerynoslavshchyna |
| Херсонская губерния | Khersonskaya guberniya | Kherson Governorate | Yedisan |
| Таврическая губерния | Tavricheskaya guberniya | Taurida Governorate | Tavriya, Tavrida |
| Бессарабская губерния | Bessarabskaya guberniya | Bessarabian Governorate | Moldavia, Basarabia |
Grand Duchy of Finland
| Улеаборгская губерния | Uleaborgskaya guberniya | Uleåborg Governorate | Oulu Province |
| Ва́заская губерния | Vázaskaya guberniya | Vasa Governorate | Vaasa Province |
| Або-Бьернеборгская губерния | Abo-Byerneborgskaya guberniya | Åbo-Björneborg Governorate | Turku and Pori Province |
| Нюландская губерния | Nyulyandskaya guberniya | Nyland Governorate | Uusimaa Province |
| Тавастгусская губерния | Tavastgusskaya guberniya | Tavastehus Governorate | Häme Province |
| Санкт-Михельская губерния | Sankt-Mikhelskaya guberniya | Saint Michel Governorate | Mikkeli Province |
| Выборгская губерния | Vyborgskaya guberniya | Vyborg Governorate | Viipuri Province |
| Куопиоская губерния | Kuopioskaya guberniya | Kuopio Governorate | Kuopio Province |
Baltic Governorates
| Эстляндская губерния | Estlyandskaya guberniya | Estonia Governorate | Eestimaa, Estland; formerly Swedish Estonia |
| Лифляндская губерния | Liflyandskaya guberniya | Livonia Governorate | Liivimaa, Vidzeme, Livland, Līvzeme; formerly Swedish Livonia |
| Курля́ндская губерния | Kurlyandskaya guberniya | Courland Governorate | Kurzeme, Kuršo; formerly the Duchy of Courland |
Vistula Krai or Congress Poland
| Калишская губерния | Kalishskaya guberniya | Kalisz Governorate | Kalish |
| Келецкая губерния | Keletskaya guberniya | Kelets Governorate | Kielce |
| Ломжинская губерния | Lomzhskaya guberniya | Lomzh Governorate | Łomża |
| Люблинская губерния | Lublinskaya guberniya | Lublin Governorate | |
| Петроковская губерния | Petrokovskaya guberniya | Petrokov Governorate | Piotrków |
| Плоцкая губерния | Plotskaya guberniya | Plotsk Governorate | Płock |
| Радомская губерния | Radomskaya guberniya | Radom Governorate | |
| Сувалкская губерния | Suvalkskaya guberniya | Suvalki Governorate | Suwałki |
| Варшавская губерния | Varshavskaya guberniya | Warsaw Governorate | Warszaw |
Asian Russia or Great Tartary
Caucasus Viceroyalty
North Caucasus
| Кубанская о́бласть | Kubanskaya oblast | Kuban Oblast | |
| Черноморская губерния | Chernomorskaya guberniya | Black Sea Governorate | Circassia |
| Терская о́бласть | Terskaya oblast | Terek Oblast | |
| Ставропольская губерния | Stavropol'skaya guberniya | Stavropol Governorate | |
| Дагестанская о́бласть | Dagestanskaya oblast | Dagestan Oblast | |
South Caucasus
| Сухумский округ | Sukhumskiy okrug | Sukhum Okrug | Abkhazia, Sokhumi |
| Кутаисская губерния | Kutaisskaya guberniya | Kutais Governorate | formerly the Kingdom of Imereti, Kutaisi |
| Батумская о́бласть | Batumskaya oblast | Batum Oblast | Batumi |
| Тифлисская губерния | Tiflisskaya guberniya | Tiflis Governorate | Tbilisi; formerly the Kingdom of Kartli-Kakheti |
| Закатальский округ | Zakatal'skiy okrug | Zakatal Okrug | Zaqatala |
| Бакинская губерния | Bakinskaya guberniya | Baku Governorate | Shirvan |
| Елизаветпольская губерния | Yelizavetpol'skaya guberniya | Elisavetpol Governorate | Ganja, Gəncə |
| Карсская о́бласть | Karsskaya oblast | Kars Oblast | Erzurum |
| Эриванская губерния | Erivanskaya guberniya | Erivan Governorate | Yerevan |
Steppes Krai (Kazakh Khanate)
| Уральская о́бласть | Ural'skaya oblast | Ural Oblast | formerly the Nogai Horde |
| Тургайская о́бласть | Turgayskaya oblast | Turgay Oblast | |
| Акмолинская о́бласть | Akmolinskaya oblast | Akmolinsk Oblast | Akmola |
| Семипалатинская о́бласть | Semipalatinskaya oblast | Semipalatinsk Oblast | Alash-qala |
Russian Turkestan
| Закаспийская о́бласть | Zakaspiyskaya oblast | Transcaspian Oblast | Transoxiana |
| Хивинское ханство | Khivinskoye khanstvo | Khanate of Khiva | |
| Бухарский Эмират | Bukharskiy Emirat | Emirate of Bukhara | |
| Самаркандская о́бласть | Samarkandskaya oblast | Samarkand Oblast | |
| Ферганская о́бласть | Ferganskaya oblast | Fergana Oblast | |
| Семиреченская о́бласть | Semirechenskaya oblast | Semirechye Oblast | "Seven Rivers" |
| Сырдарьинская о́бласть | Syrdar'inskaya oblast | Syr-Darya Oblast | |
Siberia
| Тобольская губерния | Tobol'skaya guberniya | Tobolsk Governorate | |
| Томская губерния | Tomskaya guberniya | Tomsk Governorate | |
| Енисейская губерния | Yeniseyskaya guberniya | Yeniseysk Governorate | |
| Иркутская губерния | Irkutskaya guberniya | Irkutsk Governorate | |
| Забайкальская о́бласть | Zabaykal'skaya oblast | Transbaikal Oblast | Transbaikalia, Dauria |
| Якутская о́бласть | Yakutskaya oblast | Yakutsk Oblast | Yakutia, Sakha |
| Урянхайский край | Uryankhayskiy krai | Uryankhay Krai | Tuva |
Priamurye Governorate-General
| Амурская о́бласть | Amurskaya oblast | Amur Oblast | Priamurye, Russian Manchuria |
| Приморская о́бласть | Primorskaya oblast | Primorskaya Oblast | "Maritime" |
| Камчатская о́бласть | Kamchatskaya oblast | Kamchatka Oblast | |
| Сахалинская о́бласть | Sakhalinskaya oblast | Sakhalin Oblast | |

== Soviet Russia ==
Until 1989, the Russian SFSR comprised 16 autonomous republics, 5 autonomous oblasts, 10 autonomous okrugs, 6 krais, and 49 oblasts.

Uyezds and volosts were abolished by the Soviet administrative reform of 1923–1929. Raions may be roughly called a modern equivalent of the uyezds, and selsoviets may be considered a modern equivalent of the volosts.

== Russian Federation ==
The subdivision type of Federal District was created in May 2000 by Vladimir Putin as a part of a wider program designed to reassert federal authority. The original division was into seven federal districts, but in 2010 the North Caucasian Federal District was split off from the Southern Federal District, bringing the number to eight. In 2014, the annexation of Crimea resulted in the creation of a new Crimean Federal District, bringing the number to nine, but it was later merged into the Southern Federal District. Amidst the invasion of Ukraine, four southern Ukrainian regions of Donetsk, Kherson, Luhansk and Zaporizhzhia would later be annexed into Russia in 2022 but were not integrated into the Southern Federal District. All of the six regions that are under Russian occupation are internationally recognized as part of Ukraine.
