= List of governorates of the Russian Empire =

Administrative divisions of the Russian Empire

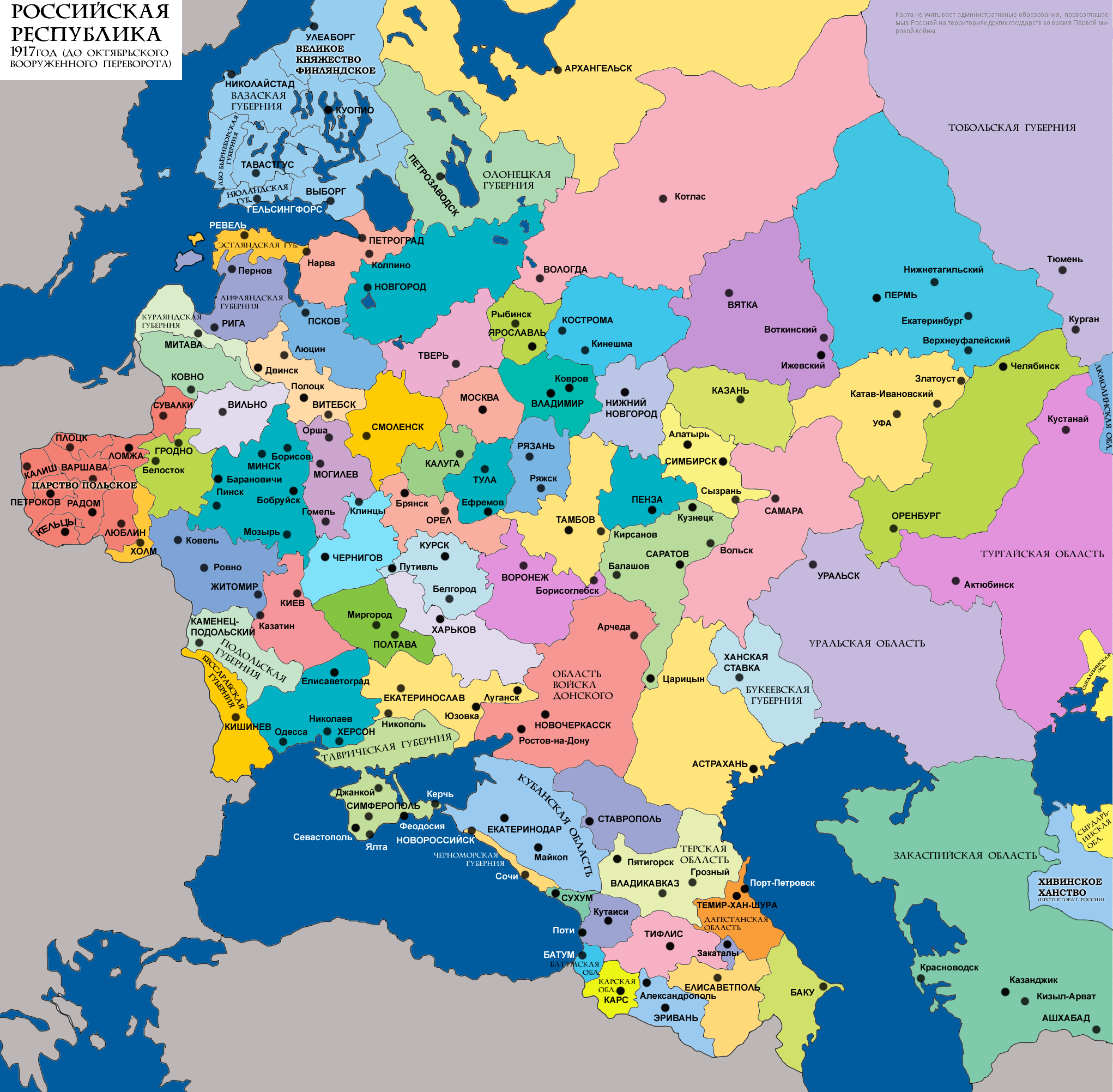
Map of governorates of the Russian Republic (Western part), 1917.

This is a list of governorates of the Russian Empire (Russian: губе́рния, romanized: guberniya; pre-1918: губе́рнія), established from the 1708 reform of Peter the Great until the creation of Kholm Governorate in 1912.

The system began in 1708 with eight primary governorates. In 1775, Catherine the Great reorganized them into viceroyalties (namestnichestvo) with standardized population quotas of 300,000 to 400,000 inhabitants, which Paul I reverted to the governorate designation in 1796. During the 19th century, the governorate model was extended to autonomous borderlands, replacing voivodeships in Congress Poland (1837) and organizing the provinces of the Grand Duchy of Finland (1831).

By 1914, on the eve of World War I, the Russian Empire comprised 78 governorates alongside 21 oblasts and 2 independent okrugs. Following the 1917 revolutions, governorates were temporarily retained in the early Soviet Union until their complete replacement by oblasts, okrugs, and raions between 1923 and 1929.

== List of governorates ==
| English name | Russian name | Transliteration | Established | Disestablished | Changed to / Notes |
|---|---|---|---|---|---|
| Åbo och Björneborg Governorate | Або-Бьёрнеборгская губерния | Abo-Byorneborgskaya guberniya | 1831 | 1917 | Turku and Pori Province in independent Finland |
| Archangelgorod Governorate | Архангелогородская губерния | Arkhangelogorodskaya guberniya | 1708 | 1780 | Vologda Viceroyalty |
| Arkhangelsk Governorate | Архангельская губерния | Arkhangelskaya guberniya | 1784 | 1929 | Northern Krai |
| Astrakhan Governorate | Астраханская губерния | Astrakhanskaya guberniya | 1717 | 1928 | Lower Volga Krai |
| Augustów Governorate | Августовская губерния | Avgustovskaya guberniya | 1837 | 1866 | Divided into Suwałki and Łomża |
| Azov Governorate (1st) | Азовская губерния | Azovskaya guberniya | 1708 | 1725 | Renamed Voronezh Governorate |
| Azov Governorate (2nd) | Азовская губерния | Azovskaya guberniya | 1775 | 1783 | Yekaterinoslav Viceroyalty |
| Baku Governorate | Бакинская губерния | Bakinskaya guberniya | 1859 | 1917 | Established after the Shamakhi earthquake (formerly Shemakha Governorate) |
| Belarus Governorate | Белорусская губерния | Belorusskaya guberniya | 1796 | 1802 | Divided into Vitebsk Governorate and Mogilev Governorate |
| Belgorod Governorate | Белгородская губерния | Belgorodskaya guberniya | 1727 | 1779 | Kursk Viceroyalty |
| Bessarabia Governorate | Бессарабская губерния | Bessarabskaya guberniya | 1873 | 1917 | Administered as Bessarabia Oblast from 1812 to 1873 |
| Black Sea Governorate | Черноморская губерния | Chernomorskaya guberniya | 1896 | 1920 | Kuban-Black Sea Oblast |
| Caucasus Governorate | Кавказская губерния | Kavkazskaya guberniya | 1802 | 1822 | Reorganized into Caucasus Oblast |
| Chernigov Governorate | Черниговская губерния | Chernigovskaya guberniya | 1802 | 1925 | Replaced by okruhas in the Ukrainian SSR |
| Chernovtsy Governorate | Черновицкая губерния | Chernovitskaya guberniya | 1914 | 1917 | Wartime administration of the Galicia Military Governorate |
| Courland Governorate | Курляндская губерния | Kurlyandskaya guberniya | 1795 | 1915 | German occupation in WWI |
| Derbent Governorate | Дербентская губерния | Derbentskaya guberniya | 1846 | 1860 | Reorganized into Dagestan Oblast |
| Erivan Governorate | Эриванская губерния | Erivanskaya guberniya | 1850 | 1917 | Transferred to First Republic of Armenia |
| Estonia Governorate | Эстляндская губерния | Estlyandskaya guberniya | 1796 | 1917 | Formerly Reval Governorate (1719–1783) |
| Grodno Governorate | Гродненская губерния | Grodnenskaya guberniya | 1801 | 1915 | German occupation in WWI |
| Irkutsk Governorate | Иркутская губерния | Irkutskaya guberniya | 1764 | 1926 | Siberian Krai |
| Kalisz Governorate | Калишская губерния | Kalishskaya guberniya | 1837 | 1914 | Merged into Warsaw (1844–1867); recreated 1867 |
| Kaluga Governorate | Калужская губерния | Kaluzhskaya guberniya | 1796 | 1929 | Western Oblast / Central Industrial Oblast |
| Kazan Governorate | Казанская губерния | Kazanskaya guberniya | 1708 | 1920 | Tatar ASSR |
| Kharkov Governorate | Харьковская губерния | Kharkovskaya guberniya | 1835 | 1925 | Known as Sloboda Ukraine Governorate (1765–1780, 1796–1835) |
| Kherson Governorate | Херсонская губерния | Khersonskaya guberniya | 1803 | 1922 | Nikolaev Governorate (1802–1803); merged into Odesa Governorate |
| Kholm Governorate | Холмская губерния | Kholmskaya guberniya | 1912 | 1917 | Detached from Congress Poland |
| Kielce Governorate | Келецкая губерния | Keletskaya guberniya | 1841 | 1914 | Merged into Radom (1844–1867); recreated 1867 |
| Kiev Governorate | Киевская губерния | Kievskaya guberniya | 1708 | 1925 | Replaced by okruhas in the Ukrainian SSR |
| Kostroma Governorate | Костромская губерния | Kostromskaya guberniya | 1796 | 1929 | Ivanovo Industrial Oblast |
| Kovno Governorate | Ковенская губерния | Kovenskaya guberniya | 1843 | 1915 | German occupation in WWI |
| Kraków Governorate | Краковская губерния | Krakovskaya guberniya | 1837 | 1844 | Merged into Radom Governorate |
| Kuopio Governorate | Куопиоская губерния | Kuopioskaya guberniya | 1831 | 1917 | Kuopio Province in independent Finland |
| Kursk Governorate | Курская губерния | Kurskaya guberniya | 1796 | 1928 | Central Black Earth Oblast |
| Kutais Governorate | Кутаисская губерния | Kutaisskaya guberniya | 1846 | 1918 | Democratic Republic of Georgia |
| Lithuania Governorate | Литовская губерния | Litovskaya guberniya | 1795 | 1801 | Divided into Vilna Governorate and Grodno Governorate |
| Livonia Governorate | Лифляндская губерния | Liflyandskaya guberniya | 1796 | 1918 | Formerly Riga Governorate (1712–1783) |
| Łomża Governorate | Ломжинская губерния | Lomzhinskaya guberniya | 1867 | 1914 | German occupation in WWI |
| Lublin Governorate | Люблинская губерния | Lyublinskaya guberniya | 1837 | 1915 | German/Austrian occupation in WWI |
| Lvov Governorate | Львовская губерния | Lvovskaya guberniya | 1914 | 1917 | Wartime administration of the Galicia Military Governorate |
| Malorossiya Governorate | Малороссийская губерния | Malorossiyskaya guberniya | 1796 | 1802 | Divided into Chernigov Governorate and Poltava Governorate |
| Masovia Governorate | Мазовецкая губерния | Mazovetskaya guberniya | 1837 | 1844 | Merged into Warsaw Governorate |
| Minsk Governorate | Минская губерния | Minskaya guberniya | 1793 | 1921 | Divided between Byelorussian SSR and Poland |
| Mogilev Governorate | Могилёвская губерния | Mogilyovskaya guberniya | 1772 | 1919 | Integrated into Gomel Governorate |
| Moscow Governorate | Московская губерния | Moskovskaya guberniya | 1708 | 1929 | Moscow Oblast |
| Nikolaistad Governorate | Николайстадская губерния | Nikolaystadskaya guberniya | 1831 | 1917 | Vaasa Province in independent Finland |
| Nizhny Novgorod Governorate | Нижегородская губерния | Nizhegorodskaya guberniya | 1714 | 1929 | Nizhny Novgorod Krai |
| Novgorod Governorate | Новгородская губерния | Novgorodskaya guberniya | 1727 | 1927 | Leningrad Oblast |
| Novorossiya Governorate | Новороссийская губерния | Novorossiyskaya guberniya | 1764 | 1802 | Divided into Yekaterinoslav, Nikolaev, and Taurida |
| Nyland Governorate | Нюландская губерния | Nyulandskaya guberniya | 1831 | 1917 | Uusimaa Province in independent Finland |
| Olonets Governorate | Олонецкая губерния | Olonetskaya guberniya | 1801 | 1922 | Divided between Karelian ASSR, Petrograd, and Vologda |
| Orenburg Governorate | Оренбургская губерния | Orenburgskaya guberniya | 1744 | 1928 | Middle Volga Oblast |
| Oryol Governorate | Орловская губерния | Orlovskaya guberniya | 1796 | 1928 | Central Black Earth Oblast |
| Penza Governorate | Пензенская губерния | Penzenskaya guberniya | 1796 | 1928 | Middle Volga Oblast |
| Peremyshl Governorate | Перемышльская губерния | Peremyshlskaya guberniya | 1914 | 1917 | Wartime administration of the Galicia Military Governorate |
| Perm Governorate | Пермская губерния | Permskaya guberniya | 1796 | 1923 | Ural Oblast |
| Piotrków Governorate | Петроковская губерния | Petrokovskaya guberniya | 1867 | 1917 | Re-established Polish administration |
| Płock Governorate | Плоцкая губерния | Plotskaya guberniya | 1867 | 1917 | Re-established Polish administration |
| Podlasie Governorate | Подлясская губерния | Podlyasskaya guberniya | 1837 | 1844 | Merged into Lublin Governorate |
| Podolia Governorate | Подольская губерния | Podolskaya guberniya | 1793 | 1925 | Replaced by okruhas in the Ukrainian SSR |
| Poltava Governorate | Полтавская губерния | Poltavskaya guberniya | 1802 | 1925 | Replaced by okruhas in the Ukrainian SSR |
| Pskov Governorate | Псковская губерния | Pskovskaya guberniya | 1796 | 1927 | Leningrad Oblast / Western Oblast |
| Radom Governorate | Радомская губерния | Radomskaya guberniya | 1844 | 1917 | Created from Sandomierz and Kraków |
| Reval Governorate | Ревельская губерния | Revelskaya guberniya | 1719 | 1783 | Reorganized into Reval Viceroyalty (later Estonia Governorate) |
| Riga Governorate | Рижская губерния | Rizhskaya guberniya | 1712 | 1783 | Reorganized into Riga Viceroyalty (later Livonia Governorate) |
| Ryazan Governorate | Рязанская губерния | Ryazanskaya guberniya | 1796 | 1929 | Moscow Oblast / Central Black Earth Oblast |
| Samara Governorate | Самарская губерния | Samarskaya guberniya | 1851 | 1928 | Middle Volga Oblast |
| Saint Michel Governorate | Санкт-Михельская губерния | Sankt-Mikhelskaya guberniya | 1831 | 1917 | Mikkeli Province in independent Finland |
| Saint Petersburg Governorate | Санкт-Петербургская губерния | Sankt-Peterburgskaya guberniya | 1708 | 1927 | Renamed Petrograd (1914) and Leningrad (1924); became Leningrad Oblast |
| Sandomierz Governorate | Сандомирская губерния | Sandomirskaya guberniya | 1837 | 1844 | Merged into Radom Governorate |
| Saratov Governorate | Саратовская губерния | Saratovskaya guberniya | 1797 | 1928 | Lower Volga Krai |
| Siberia Governorate | Сибирская губерния | Sibirskaya guberniya | 1708 | 1782 | Divided into Tobolsk and Kolyvan viceroyalties |
| Siedlce Governorate | Седлецкая губерния | Sedletskaya guberniya | 1867 | 1912 | Split between Kholm, Lublin, and Łomża |
| Simbirsk Governorate | Симбирская губерния | Simbirskaya guberniya | 1796 | 1928 | Middle Volga Oblast |
| Sloboda Ukraine Governorate | Слободско-Украинская губерния | Slobodsko-Ukrainskaya guberniya | 1765 | 1835 | Renamed Kharkov Governorate |
| Smolensk Governorate | Смоленская губерния | Smolenskaya guberniya | 1708 | 1929 | Western Oblast |
| Stavropol Governorate | Ставропольская губерния | Stavropolskaya guberniya | 1847 | 1924 | North Caucasus Krai |
| Suwałki Governorate | Сувалкская губерния | Suvalkskaya guberniya | 1867 | 1914 | German occupation in WWI |
| Tambov Governorate | Тамбовская губерния | Tambovskaya guberniya | 1796 | 1928 | Central Black Earth Oblast |
| Taurida Governorate | Таврическая губерния | Tavricheskaya guberniya | 1802 | 1921 | Administered as Taurida Oblast (1784–1796); became Crimean ASSR |
| Tavastehus Governorate | Тавастгусская губерния | Tavastgusskaya guberniya | 1831 | 1917 | Häme Province in independent Finland |
| Ternopol Governorate | Тарнопольская губерния | Tarnopolskaya guberniya | 1914 | 1917 | Wartime administration of the Galicia Military Governorate |
| Tiflis Governorate | Тифлисская губерния | Tiflisskaya guberniya | 1846 | 1917 | Transferred to Democratic Republic of Georgia |
| Tobolsk Governorate | Тобольская губерния | Tobolskaya guberniya | 1796 | 1919 | Reorganized into Tyumen Governorate |
| Tomsk Governorate | Томская губерния | Tomskaya guberniya | 1804 | 1925 | Siberian Krai |
| Tula Governorate | Тульская губерния | Tulskaya guberniya | 1796 | 1929 | Moscow Oblast / Central Industrial Oblast |
| Tver Governorate | Тверская губерния | Tverskaya guberniya | 1796 | 1929 | Moscow Oblast / Western Oblast |
| Ufa Governorate | Уфимская губерния | Ufimskaya guberniya | 1865 | 1922 | Merged into Bashkir ASSR |
| Uleåborg Governorate | Улеаборгская губерния | Uleaborgskaya guberniya | 1831 | 1917 | Oulu Province in independent Finland |
| Vilna Governorate | Виленская губерния | Vilenskaya guberniya | 1801 | 1915 | German occupation in WWI |
| Vitebsk Governorate | Витебская губерния | Vitebskaya guberniya | 1802 | 1924 | Divided between Byelorussian SSR and RSFSR |
| Vladimir Governorate | Владимирская губерния | Vladimirskaya guberniya | 1796 | 1929 | Ivanovo Industrial Oblast |
| Volhynia Governorate | Волынская губерния | Volynskaya guberniya | 1796 | 1925 | Replaced by okruhas in the Ukrainian SSR |
| Vologda Governorate | Вологодская губерния | Vologodskaya guberniya | 1796 | 1929 | Northern Krai |
| Voronezh Governorate | Воронежская губерния | Voronezhskaya guberniya | 1725 | 1928 | Central Black Earth Oblast |
| Vyatka Governorate | Вятская губерния | Vyatskaya guberniya | 1796 | 1929 | Nizhny Novgorod Krai |
| Vyborg Governorate | Выборгская губерния | Vyborgskaya guberniya | 1744 | 1812 | Transferred to Grand Duchy of Finland as Viipuri Province |
| Warsaw Governorate | Варшавская губерния | Varshavskaya guberniya | 1844 | 1917 | Re-established Polish administration |
| Yaroslavl Governorate | Ярославская губерния | Yaroslavskaya guberniya | 1796 | 1929 | Ivanovo Industrial Oblast |
| Yekaterinoslav Governorate | Екатеринославская губерния | Yekaterinoslavskaya guberniya | 1802 | 1925 | Replaced by okruhas in the Ukrainian SSR |
| Yelizavetpol Governorate | Елизаветпольская губерния | Yelizavetpolskaya guberniya | 1868 | 1917 | Transferred to TDFR |
| Yeniseysk Governorate | Енисейская губерния | Yeniseyskaya guberniya | 1822 | 1925 | Siberian Krai |

== See also ==
- History of the administrative division of Russia
- Governorates of the Grand Duchy of Finland
- Subdivisions of Congress Poland
