= Radom Department =

Coordinates: 51°24′00″N 21°10′00″E

See also Subdivisions of the Duchy of Warsaw

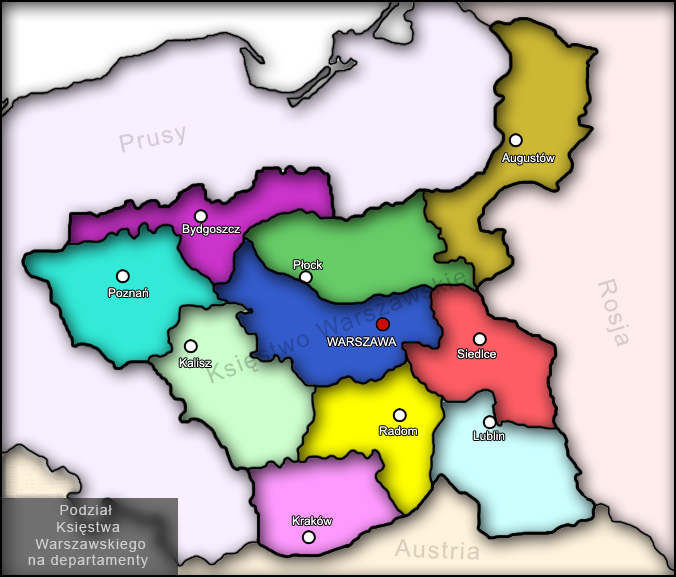
Administrative division of the Duchy of Warsaw, 1810–1815. Radom Department is yellow in the center-south.

Radom Department (Polish: Departament radomski) was a unit of administrative division and local government in Polish Duchy of Warsaw in years 1809–1815.

Added in 1809, after the Polish - Austrian War (the four departments of former West Galicia were created by a royal decree on February 24, 1810. Its capital city was Radom, and it was further divided onto 10 powiats.

In 1810 Radom became the center of the region replacing Sandomierz. It was surrounded by natural boarders from the North, East, and West via the Vistula and Pilicia rivers. Its size was approximately 15,000 km^{2} with a population of around 350,000.

In 1815 it was transformed into Sandomierz Voivodeship.
