= Subdivisions of the Duchy of Warsaw =

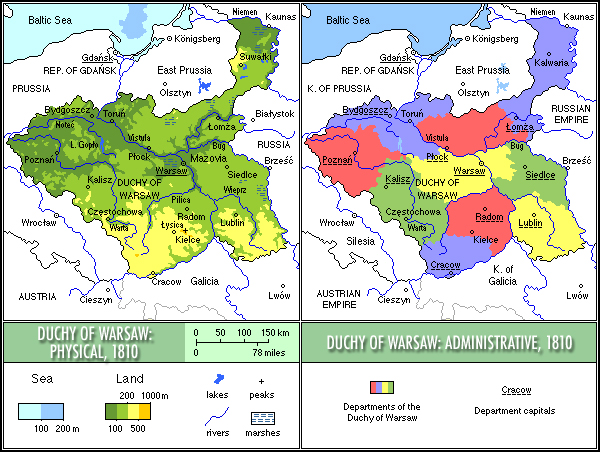
Administrative division of Duchy of Warsaw, 1810-1815

Subdivisions of the Duchy of Warsaw were based on departments that were headed by prefects. The subsidivions were based on the French model following the erection of the Duchy of Warsaw by Napoleon. The departments were in turn subdivided into traditional Polish powiats (counties). Initially six departments were created from the territory annexed from the Kingdom of Prussia. After the 1809 Polish–Austrian War and the Treaty of Schönbrunn the duchy's territory was expanded and their number increased to ten. Each department was named after its capital city.

The departments were divided into powiats, and the powiats were divided into urban and rural gminas. Each department was governed by a prefect, while counties were administered by a prefect deputy (Polish: podprefekt). Main cities of the Duchy (Warsaw, Poznan, Kalisz, Torun, Lublin, Kraków and Sandomierz) were administered by mayors (Polish: prezydent), who were nominated by King Frederick Augustus I. The initial six departments were created by a Napoleon’s decree of January 14, 1807.

In January 1807 the Duchy of Warsaw was divided into the following departments:

- Departament warszawski (Warsaw Department)
- Departament poznański (Poznań Department)
- Departament kaliski (Kalisz Department)
- Departament bydgoski (Bydgoszcz Department)
- Departament płocki (Płock Department)
- Departament łomżyński (Łomża Department) - for the first few months known as Białystok Department (Departament białostocki)

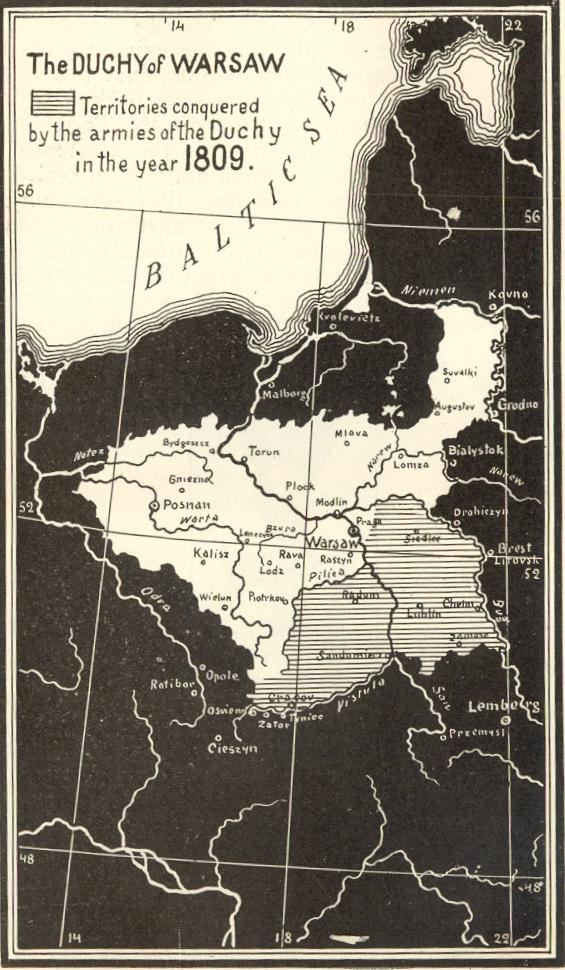
Duchy in 1811. Territories added in 1809 are shaded

Added in 1809, after the Polish - Austrian War (the four departments of former West Galicia were created by a royal decree on February 24, 1810. On April 17, 1810, they were divided into forty counties):

- Departament krakowski (Kraków Department)
- Departament lubelski (Lublin Department)
- Departament radomski (Radom Department)
- Departament siedlecki (Siedlce Department)

In 1815 the Duchy of Warsaw was divided into Prussian-administered Grand Duchy of Posen and Russian-controlled Congress Poland. In 1816, the departments of Congress Poland were turned into voivodeships (see Administrative division of Congress Poland).
