= Turek County (historical) =

Turek County (Polish: powiat turecki, Russian: Турекский уезд) was a second-level subdivision (Polish: powiat, Russian: uyezd) in Congress Poland, Russian Empire with the administrative center in Turek. It was established in 1867 from an eastern part of the Kalisz County of Kalisz Governorate. It included the cities of Turek, Dobra, Uniejów, Warta and gminas of Biernacice, Goszczanów, Grzybki. Kościelnica, Kowale Pańskie, Lubola, Malanów, Niemysłów, Niewiesz, Ostrów Warcki, Piekary, Pęcherzew, Piętno, Skarżyn, Skotniki, Tokary, Wichertów, Wola Świnecka, Zelgoszcz. In 1886 Warta and the village of Bartochów were transferred to Sieradz County.

In 1890, the population of the county was 98,638 persons, with 87% being ethnic Poles.

In 1916 (end of World War I) the German occupation administration joined Turek and Kalisz counties into one with the administration in Kalisz.

In 1918 it was transformed into the Turek County of Łódź Voivodeship, Second Polish Republic. In 1938 it was transferred to the Poznań Voivodeship.
