= Kraków Department =

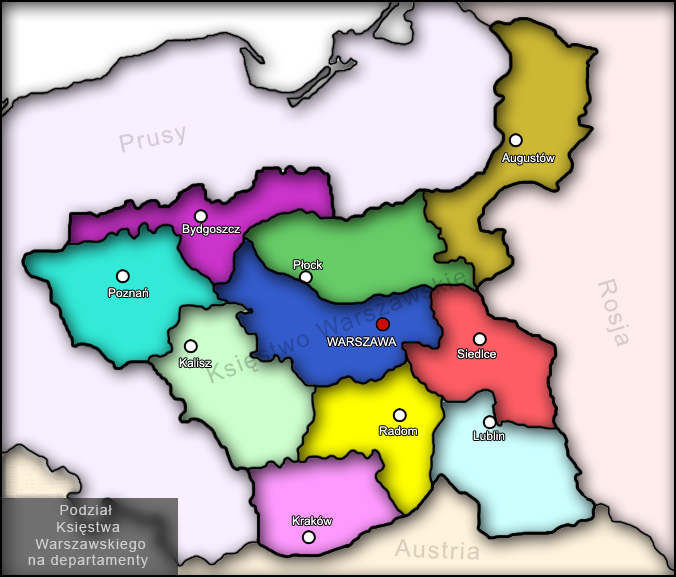
Administrative division of the Duchy of Warsaw, 1810–1815. Kraków Department is light pink in the south.

Kraków Department (Polish: Departament krakowski) was a unit of administrative division and local government in Polish Duchy of Warsaw in years 1809–1815.

Its capital city was Kraków and the area was further subdivided onto 10 powiats.

Kraków Department was formed following the annexation of Austrian New Galicia by the Duchy of Warsaw in 1809 including areas of Zamość and Kraków. The expansion resulted in the duchy's area increasing significantly, to around 155,000 square kilometres (60,000 square miles), with its population also increasing substantially, to roughly 4,300,000.

In 1815 it was transformed into Kraków Voivodeship, the city of Kraków itself was turned into the Free City of Kraków.
