= Obwód =

Obwód (plural obwody) is a term used in Polish to denote administrative districts in various countries, particularly as a translation of the Russian oblast. As administrative subdivisions of Poland itself, obwody existed as subdivisions of voivodeships (later gubernias) in the early part of the Congress Poland period, from 1816 until 1842, when they were renamed powiats (the former powiats being renamed okręgi). See Administrative division of Congress Poland.

Obwody were also created temporarily in 1945–46, in the areas annexed to Poland from Germany as a result of the Soviet military advance. An obwód was then a subdivision of an okręg. These obwody were later replaced by powiats, and the okręgi by voivodeships.
