= Sandomierz Governorate =

1837–1844 unit of Poland

Sandomierz Governorate (Note: Russian: Сандомирская губерния, romanized: Sandomirskaya guberniya; Polish: Gubernia sandomierska) was an administrative-territorial unit (guberniya) of Congress Poland of the Russian Empire.

Coat of arms

== History ==
It was created in 1837 from the Sandomierz Voivodeship, and had the same borders and capital (Radom) as the voivodeship. Its lower levels of administration were also mostly unchanged, although renamed from obwóds to powiats. Reform of 1844 merged the governorate with Kielce Governorate, creating a new entity, the Radom Governorate.
