= Piotrków Governorate =

1867–1915 unit of Poland

Coordinates: 51°24′18″N 19°41′36″E

Piotrków Governorate Петроковская губерния Gubernia piotrkowska
- Governorate of Congress Poland
- 1867–1915
- Coat of arms

- Location in the Russian Empire
- Capital: Petrokov
- Area
- 12,249.4 km^{2} (4,729.5 sq mi)
- Population
  - 1897: 1,403,901
- History
  - Established: 1867
  - Disestablished: 1915
| Preceded by | Succeeded by |
| Warsaw Governorate | Government General of Warsaw |

Piotrków Governorate (Note: Russian: Петроковская губерния, romanized: Petrokovskaya guberniya; Polish: Gubernia piotrkowska) was an administrative-territorial unit (guberniya) of Congress Poland of the Russian Empire, established in 1867 by splitting some areas of Radom and Warsaw Governorates. Its capital was in Petrokov (Piotrków Trybunalski).

== History ==
It was created in 1867, split off from parts of Radom and Warsaw Governorates. It consisted of the uzeyds of Będzin, Częstochowa, Radomsko and Łódź.

== Language ==
- By the Imperial census of 1897. In **bold** are languages spoken by more people than the state language.

| Language | Number | percentage (%) | males | females |
|---|---|---|---|---|
| **Polish** | 1 011 928 | 72.07 | 497 412 | 514 516 |
| **Yiddish** | 213 562 | 15.21 | 104 914 | 108 648 |
| **German** | 148 765 | 10.59 | 72 445 | 76 320 |
| Russian | 19 232 | 1.36 | 14 938 | 4 294 |
| Czech | 4 987 | 0.35 | 2 563 | 2 424 |
| Ukrainian | 2 723 | 0.19 | 2 622 | 101 |
| Other | 2 614 | 0.18 | 2 153 | 461 |
| Persons that didn't name their native language | 90 | >0.01 | 49 | 41 |
| Total | 1 403 901 | 100 | 697 096 | 706 805 |
