= Kalisz Governorate =

1867–1915 unit of Poland

Coordinates: 51°45′50″N 18°05′04″E

Kalisz Governorate Калишская губерния Gubernia kaliska
- Governorate of Congress Poland
- 1867–1915
- Coat of arms

- Location in the Russian Empire
- Capital: Kalish
- Area
- 11,336.6 km^{2} (4,377.1 sq mi)
- Population
  - 1897: 840,597
- History
  - Established: 1867
  - Disestablished: 1915
Preceded by	Succeeded by
Warsaw Governorate	Government General of Warsaw

Kalisz Governorate (Note: Russian: Калишская губерния, romanized: Kalishskaya guberniya; Polish: Gubernia kaliska) was an administrative-territorial unit (guberniya) of Congress Poland of the Russian Empire.

== History ==
It was created in 1837 from the Kalisz Voivodeship, and had the same borders and centre (Kalisz) as the voivodeship.

The Reform of 1844 merged the governorate into the larger Warsaw Governorate, until the 1867 reform which reversed those changes and recreated the Kalisz Governorate.

== Administrative division (since 1867) ==
The Kalisz Governorate was divided into 8 counties. List of counties:

- Kalisz County
- Koło County
- Konin County
- Łęczyca County
- Sieradz County
- Słupca County
- Turek County
- Wieluń County

== Language ==
Numbers of speakers according to the Imperial census of 1897. In bold are languages spoken by more people than the state language.
Language	Total	Percentage	Males	Females
**Polish**	705 400	83.91%	345 348	360 052
**Yiddish**	64 193	7.63%	30 941	33 252
**German**	61 482	7.31%	30 289	31 193
Russian	7 451	0.88%	5 985	1 466
Ukrainian	1 429	0.16%	1 391	38
Other	618	<0.1%	521	97
No native language named	22	<0.01%	11	11
Total	840 597	100%	414 488	426 109
