= Kraków Voivodeship (1816–1837) =

Former subdivision of the Congress Poland

- Voivodeship of the Congress Poland and the Polish-Lithuanian-Ruthenian Commonwealth
- Coat of arms

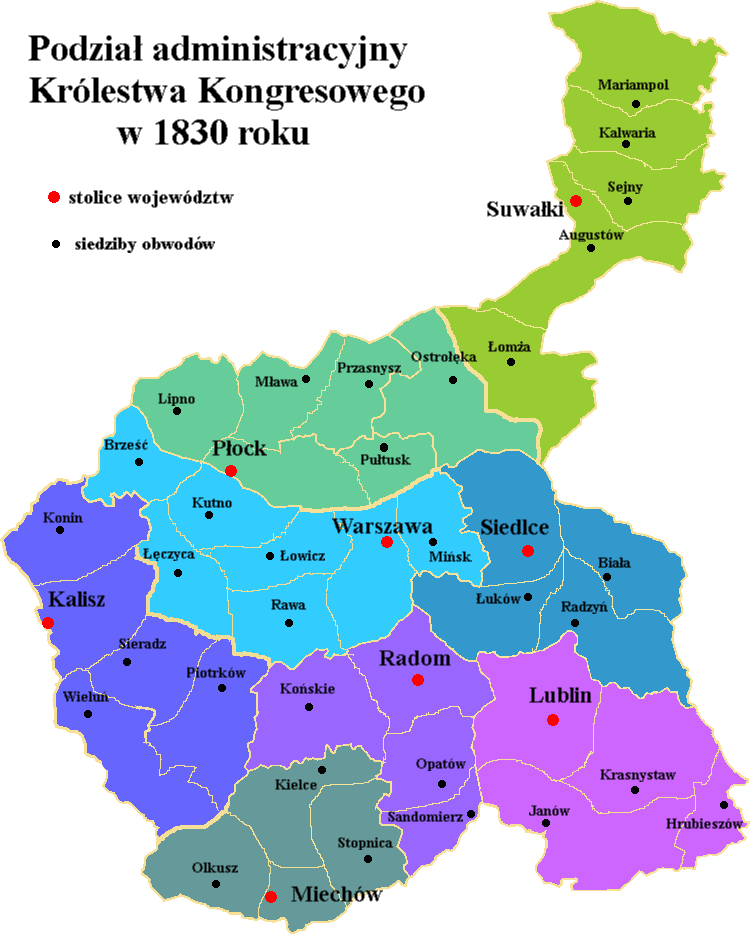
- The administrative subdivisions of the Congress Poland in 1830, including the Kraków Voivodeship.
- Capital: Miechów (1816); Kielce (1816–1837)
- History
  - Establishment: 16 January 1816
  - Replacement by the Kalisz Governorate: 23 February 1837
  - Reestablishment during the January Uprising: 1863
  - Abolishment by the Russian Empire: 1864
- Contained within
  - Country: Congress Poland (1816–1837); Polish-Lithuanian-Ruthenian Commonwealth (1863–1864)
Preceded by	Succeeded by
Kraków Department; Radom Governorate	Kraków Governorate; Radom Governorate

The Kraków Voivodeship (Note: English pronunciation: /ˈkrækaʊ, ˈkrækoʊ/ KRAK-ow, KRAK-oh, US also /ˈkreɪkaʊ, ˈkrɑːkaʊ/ KRAY-kow, KRAH-kow, UK also /ˈkrækɒf/ KRAK-of; Polish pronunciation: [ˈkrakuf]. Also spelled in English as Cracow, or without Polish diacritics as Krakow.) (Note: Polish: Województwo krakowskie) was a voivodeship of the Congress Poland, that existed from 1816 to 1837. Until 6 December 1816, its capital was Miechów, and since then it was Kielce. It was established on 16 January 1816, from Kraków Department, and existed until 23 February 1837, when it was replaced by the Kraków Governorate. During the January Uprising, the Polish National Government, announced the re-establishment of the voivodeships with the borders from 1816, reestablishing the administration of the Kraków Voivodeship within the part of Radom Governorate. It existed from 1863 to 1864, when it was abolished, and replaced by the Radom Governorate. It was named after the nearby historic city of Kraków, which itself was'not located in the voivodeship, and was instead located in the Free City of Cracow.

== Subdivisions ==
- Kielce District (seat: Kielce)
  - Kielce County (seat: Kielce)
  - Jędrzejów County (seat: Jędrzejów)
- Miechów District (seat: Miechów)
  - Kraków County
  - Miechów County (seat: Miechów)
  - Szkalbmierz County (seat: Szkalbmierz)
- Olkusz District (seat: Olkusz)
  - Lelów County (seat: Lelów)
  - Olkusz County (seat: Olkusz)
  - Pileca County (seat: Pileca)
- Stobnica County (seat: Stobnica)
  - Szydłów County (seat: Szydłów)
