= Kielce Governorate =

1867–1915 unit of Poland

Coordinates: 50°52′21″N 20°37′55″E

Kielce Governorate Келецкая губерния Gubernia kielecka
- Governorate of Congress Poland
- 1867–1915
- Coat of arms

- Location in the Russian Empire
- Capital: Keltsy
- Area
- 10,093 km^{2} (3,897 sq mi)
- Population
  - 1897: 761,995
- History
  - Established: 1867
  - Disestablished: 1915
Preceded by	Succeeded by
Radom Governorate	Government General of Warsaw

Kielce Governorate (Note: Russian: Келецкая губерния, pre-1918: Кѣлецкая губернія, romanized: Keletskaya guberniya; Polish: Gubernia kielecka) was an administrative-territorial unit (guberniya) of Congress Poland of the Russian Empire.

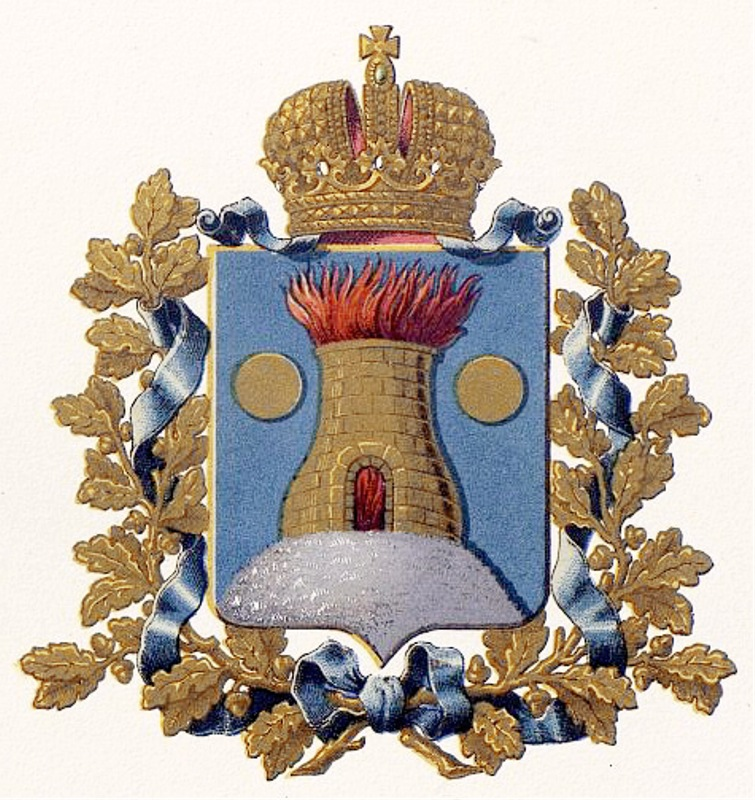
Coat of arms, 1880 illustration

== History ==
It was created in 1841 from the Kraków Governorate, both with capital in Kelets (Кѣльцы). It was merged into Radom Governorate during the 1844 reorganisation that reduced the number of governorates to just five. In 1866/67 it was recreated in the further reforms that brought the administrative structure of Poland closer to that of the Russian Empire.

== Administrative divisions ==
The Kielce Governorate consisted of 7 uezds (their administrative centres in brackets):

County		County Town	Area	Population (1897 census)
Transliteration name	Russian Cyrillic	County Town	Area	Population (1897 census)
Andreevsky	Андреевский	Andreev	1,269.85 km^{2} (490.29 mi^{2})	78,889
Vloshchovsky	Влощовский	Vloshchov	1,386.16 km^{2} (535.20 mi^{2})	74,437
Keletsky	Келецкий	Kyeltsy	1,907.96 km^{2} (736.67 mi^{2})	142,754
Mekhovsky	Меховский	Mekhov	1,370.68 km^{2} (529.22 mi^{2})	114,410
Olkushsky	Олькушский	Olkush	1,405.96 km^{2} (542.84 mi^{2})	113,540
Pinchovsky	Пинчовский	Pinchov	1,154.22 km^{2} (445.65 mi^{2})	107,495
Stopnitsky	Стопницкий	Stopnitsa	1,598.18 km^{2} (617.06 mi^{2})	130,470

== Language ==
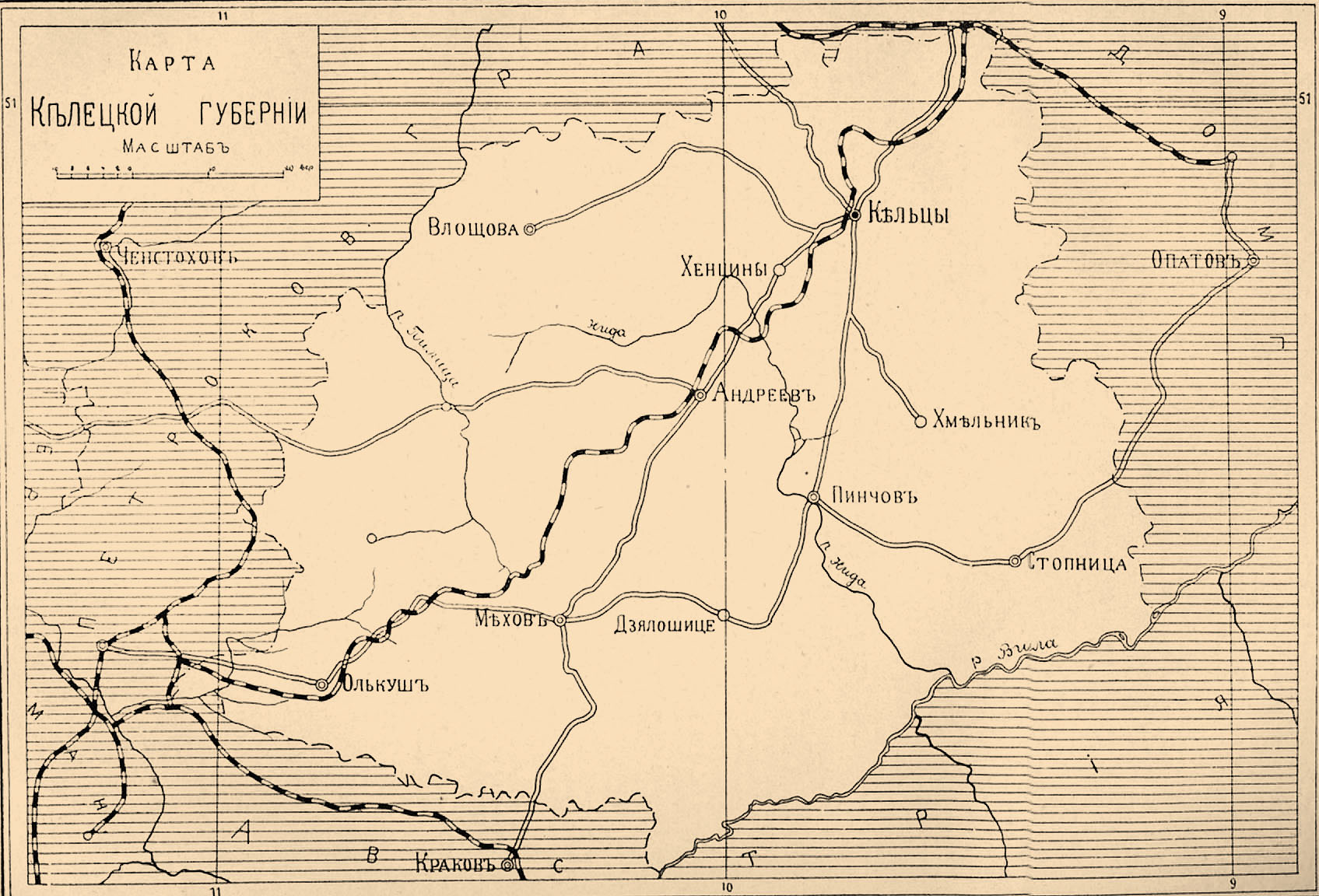
Келецкая губерния

- By the Imperial census of 1897. In **bold** are languages spoken by more people than the state language.

Language	Number	percentage (%)	males	females
**Polish**	666 772	87.5	323 858	342 914
**Yiddish**	83 017	10.89	40 528	42 489
Russian	7 983	1.04	6 506	1 477
German	2 428	0.31	1 224	1 204
Ukrainian	1 088	0.16	1 015	73
Other	706	>0.1	568	138
Persons that didn't name their native language	1	>0.01	1	0
Total	761 995	100	373 700	388 295

== See also ==
- Geographical Dictionary of the Kingdom of Poland
