= Kielce Voivodeship (1919–1939) =

Former voivodeship of Poland

Coordinates: 50°52′21″N 20°37′55″E

Kielce Voivodeship Województwo kieleckie
- Voivodeship of Poland
- 1919–1939
- Coat of arms

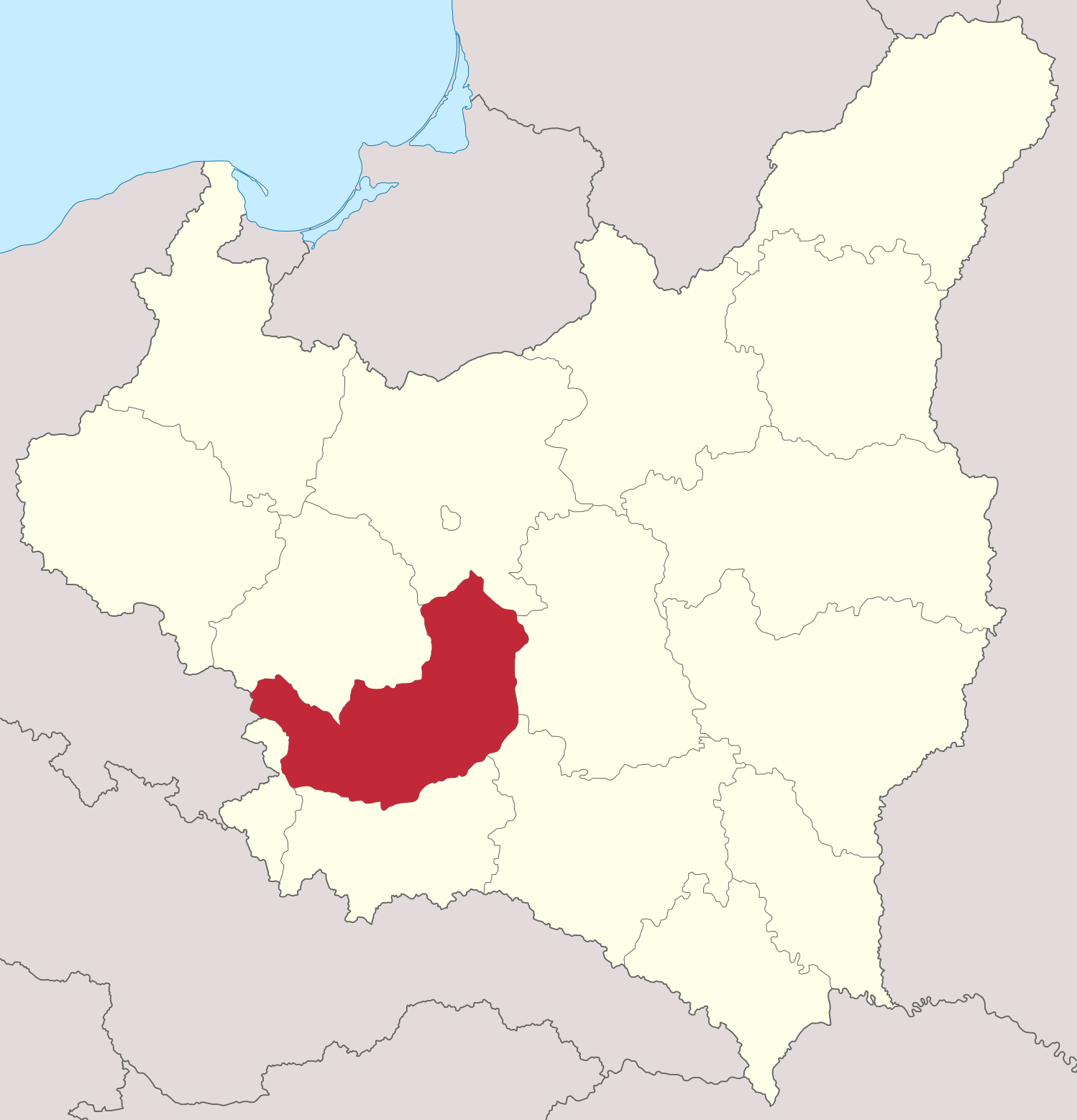
- Location of the Kielce Voivodeship (red) within the Second Polish Republic, 1938.
- Capital: Kielce
- Area
  - 1921: 25,741 km^{2} (9,939 sq mi)
  - 1939: 22,204 km^{2} (8,573 sq mi)
- Population
  - 1921: 2,535,898
  - 1931: 2,935,697
- Government
  - Type: Voivodeship
- Voivodes
  - 1919–1923: Stanisław Franciszek Pękosławski
  - 1934–1939: Władysław Dziadosz
- Historical era: Interwar period
  - Established: 14 August 1919
  - Territorial changes: 1 April 1938
  - Annexed by Germany: September 1939
- Political subdivisions: 18 powiats
Preceded by	Succeeded by
Radom Governorate; Kielce Governorate	Province of Upper Silesia; General Government

Kielce Voivodeship (Polish: województwo kieleckie) was a unit of administrative division and local government in the Second Polish Republic during the years 1921–1939. At the time, it covered the northern counties of the historic province of Lesser Poland, including the cities of Radom, Częstochowa and Sosnowiec. On 1 April 1938, its borders changed (see: Territorial changes of Polish Voivodeships on 1 April 1938). Its capital city was Kielce.

== Location and area ==
In early 1939, the Voivodeship's area was 22 204 square kilometers. It was located in central Poland, bordering Germany and Autonomous Silesian Voivodeship to the west, Łódź Voivodeship and Warsaw Voivodeship to the north, Lublin Voivodeship and Lwów Voivodeship to the east and Kraków Voivodeship to the south. Landscape was flat in the northern part and hilly in mid and south, with the Świętokrzyskie Mountains located in the heart of the area. Forests covered 21.2%, with the national average 22.2% (as for January 1, 1937).

== Population ==
According to the 1931 Polish census, the population was 2,935,697. Poles made 88.9% of population, Jews - 10.7%. The latter preferred to live in the cities and towns - in 1931 Jews made 28.7% of Voivodeship's cities inhabitants. Illiterate (in 1931) was 25.7%, higher than the national average of 23.1%.

== Industry ==
Kielce Voivodeship was very divided in industrial terms. Its western part, with such cities as Częstochowa, Sosnowiec or Będzin was highly industrialized and urbanized, with numerous coalmines. Also Radom, located in the north, was a big industrial center, together with newly built or newly industrialized nearby towns Pionki and Starachowice. Eastern part, on the other hand, was backward, with little industry and underdeveloped agriculture. In mid-1930s Polish government started a huge public works program, called Centralny Okreg Przemyslowy, which was a great boost to overpopulated and poor central and eastern counties.

== Cities and administrative divisions ==
Between April 1, 1938, and September 1, 1939, it consisted of 18 powiats (counties). These were:

- Będzin county (area 459 km^{2}, pop. 231 300),
- Częstochowa county (area 1 855 km^{2}, pop. 182 600),
- city of Częstochowa county (powiat czestochowski grodzki), (area 48 km^{2}, pop. 117 200),
- Iłża county (area 1 835 km^{2}, pop. 162 400),
- Jędrzejów county (area 1 277 km^{2}, pop. 108 800),
- Kielce county (area 2 052 km^{2}, pop. 244 100),
- Kozienice county (area 1 857 km^{2}, pop. 143 100),
- Miechów county (area 1 353 km^{2}, pop. 153 700),
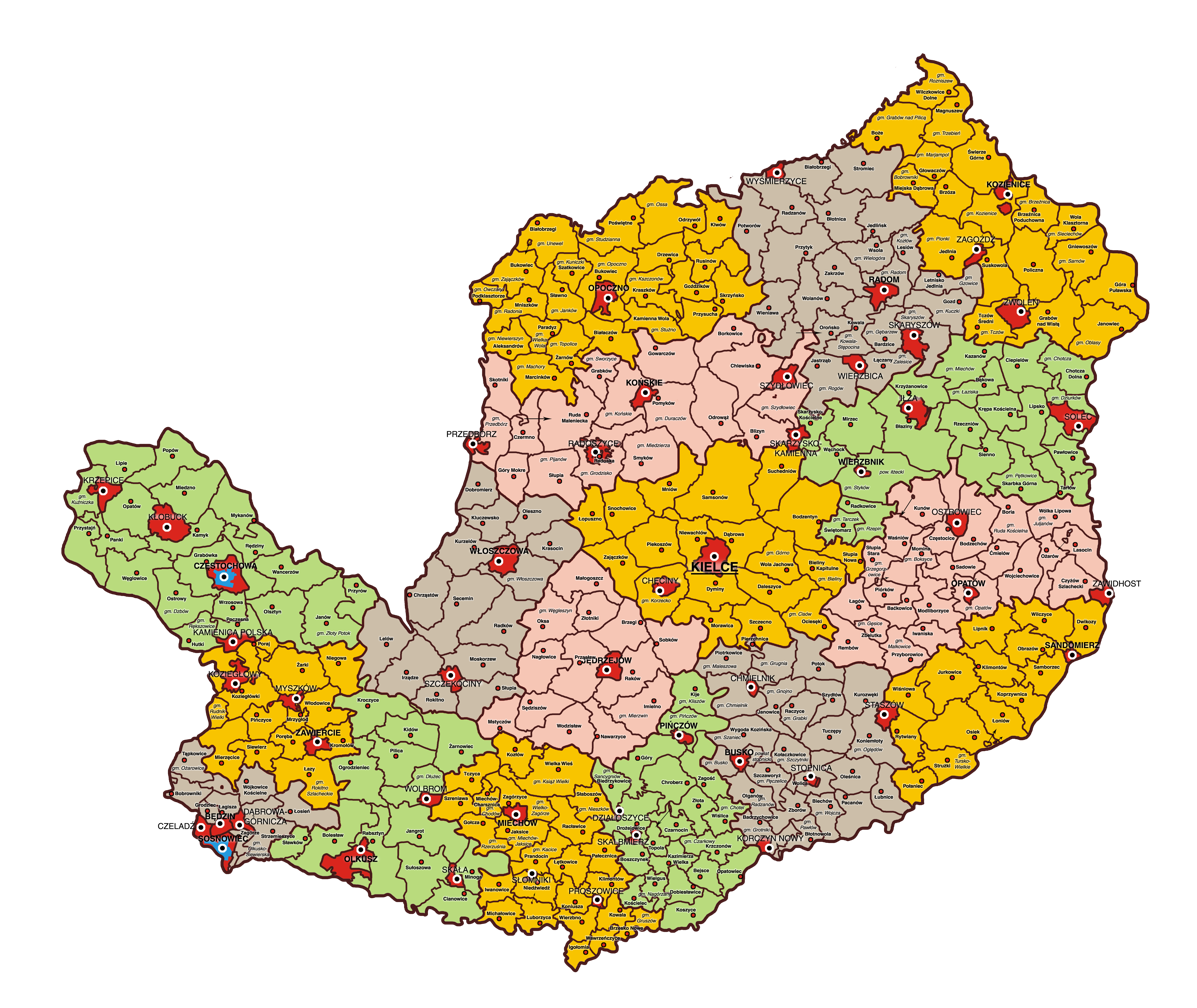
- Map of the administrative division of Voivodeship as of 1938.
  Olkusz county (area 1 361 km^{2}, pop. 151 300),
- Opatów county (area 1 639 km^{2}, pop. 186 500),
- Pińczów county (area 1 148 km^{2}, pop. 126 000),
- Radom county (area 2 095 km^{2}, pop. 166 900),
- city of Radom county (powiat radomski grodzki) (area 25 km^{2}, pop. 77 900),
- Sandomierz county (area 1 186 km^{2}, pop. 124 400),
- city of Sosnowiec county (powiat sosnowiecki grodzki) (area 33 km^{2}, pop. 109 000),
- Stopnica county (area 1 590 km^{2}, pop. 153 200),
- Włoszczowa county (area 1 446 km^{2}, pop. 101 600),
- Zawiercie county (area 945 km^{2}, pop. 131 000).

According to the 1931 census, biggest cities in Kielce Voivodeship were:

- Częstochowa (pop. 117 200),
- Sosnowiec (pop. 109 000),
- Radom (pop. 77 900),
- Kielce (pop. 58 200),
- Będzin (pop. 47 600),
- Dąbrowa Górnicza (pop. 36 900),
- Zawiercie (pop. 32 900),
- Ostrowiec Świętokrzyski (pop. 25 900).

== Voivodes ==
- Stanisław Franciszek Pękosławski 19 November 1919 – 31 May 1923
- Adam Kroebl 1 July 1923 – 31 August 1923 (acting)
- Mieczysław Bilski 1 September 1923 – 6 May 1924
- Ignacy Manteuffel 24 May 1924 – 17 August 1927
- Adam Kroebl 20 August 1927 – 20 October 1927 (acting)
- Władysław Korsak 21 October 1927 – 28 February 1930
- Jerzy Paciorkowski 18 February 1930 – 15 May 193
- Stanisław Jarecki 17 May 1934 – 9 July 1934 (acting)
- Władysław Dziadosz 9 July 1934 – September 1939

== See also ==
- Poland's current Świętokrzyskie Voivodeship
