= Kraków Governorate =

1837–1844 unit of Poland

Coordinates: 50°03′32″N 19°56′28″E

Kraków Governorate Краковская губерния
- Governorate of Congress Poland
- 1837–1844
- Coat of arms
- Capital: Kielce
- History
  - Established: 7 March 1837
  - Disestablished: 1 January 1844
Preceded by	Succeeded by
Kraków Voivodeship (1816–1837)	Radom Governorate

Kraków Governorate (Note: Russian: Краковская губерния, romanized: Krakovskaya guberniya; Polish: Gubernia krakowska) was an administrative-territorial unit (guberniya) of Congress Poland of the Russian Empire.

Kraków Governorate was created from the Kraków Voivodeship by the Tsar's Decree in 7 March 1837. In 1842, it was renamed Kielce Governorate, and then, with the introduction of a new administrative division in Congress Poland on 1 January 1844, Kielce Governorate was merged with Sandomierz Governorate and received the name Radom Governorate.
