= Radom Governorate =

1844–1915 unit of Poland

Coordinates: 51°24′00″N 21°10′00″E

Radom Governorate Радомская губерния Gubernia radomska
- Governorate of Congress Poland
- 1844–1915
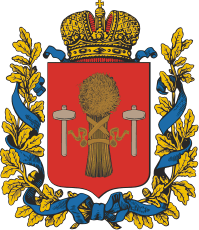
- Coat of arms

- Location in the Russian Empire
- Capital: Radom
- Area
- 11,578 km^{2} (4,470 sq mi)
- Population
  - 1897: 814,947
- History
  - Established: 1844
  - Disestablished: 1915
Preceded by	Succeeded by
Sandomierz Governorate	Government General of Warsaw

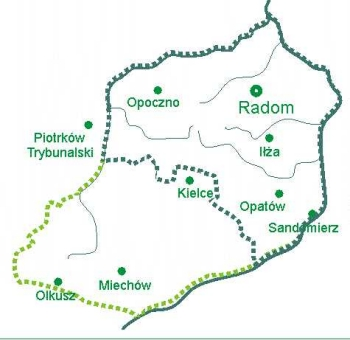
Map. Light green for pre-1866 borders, dark green post-1866.

Radom Governorate (Note: Russian: Радомская Губерния, romanized: Radomskaya guberniya; Polish: Gubernia radomska) was an administrative-territorial unit (guberniya) of Congress Poland of the Russian Empire.

== History ==
It was created in 1844 from the merger of the Sandomierz Governorate with Kielce Governorate. Its capital was in Radom (previously a capital of the Sandomierz Governorate).

It was divided into 8 powiats: Kielce, Miechów, Olkusz, Opatów, Opoczno, Radom and Sandomierz.

In 1866 the Kielce Governorate was once again made an independent entity, and thus split off from the Radom Governorate.

== Language ==
- By the Imperial census of 1897. In **bold** are languages spoken by more people than the state language.

Language	Number	percentage (%)	males	females
**Polish**	681 061	83.57	336 398	344 663
**Yiddish**	112 123	13.75	54 524	57 599
Russian	9 581	1.17	7 969	1 612
German	8 755	1.07	4 381	4 374
Ukrainian	1 642	0.2	1 548	94
Romanian	1 343	0.42	1 343	0
Other	430	>0.01	430	154
Persons that didn't name their native language	12	>0.01	10	2
Total	814 947	100	406 449	408 498
