= Coat of arms of Świętokrzyskie Voivodeship =

Polish coat of arms

- Armiger: Świętokrzyskie Voivodeship
- Adopted: 18 February 2013 (current version); 11 October 1999 (first versionl as the coat of arms of the Świętokrzyskie Voivodeship); 28 October 1997 (first version; as the coat of arms of the Kielce Voivodeship)

The coat of arms that serves as the symbol of the Świętokrzyskie Voivodeship, Poland, consists of the Iberian style escutcheon (shield), with square top and rounded base, that is divided in the 2 by 2 chessboard pattern. The top left field features a yellow patriarchal cross. The top right field features a white eagle with yellow crown, beak, legs, stripes on its wings, and a ring on its tail. The bottom left field features eight yellow six-pointed starts, placed in three rows, each with three stars, with the exception of the bottom row, that only had 2 stars, placed to the left.

It was originally designed as the coat of arms of the Kielce Voivodeship, which used it from 1997 to 1998. It was adopted as the coat of arms of the Świętokrzyskie Voivodeship in 1999. The current version of the design had been adopted in 2013.

== Design ==
The coat of arms of the Świętokrzyskie Voivodeship consists of the Iberian style escutcheon (shield), with square top and rounded base, that is divided in the 2 by 2 chessboard pattern. The top left and bottom right fields are blue, while, the top right is red, and the bottom left, consists of eight stripes, that, starting from the top, alternate between red and white colours. The top left field features a yellow patriarchal cross. The top right field features a white eagle with yellow crown, beak, legs, stripes on its wings, and a ring on its tail. The bottom left field features eight yellow six-pointed starts, placed in three rows, each with three stars, with the exception of the bottom row, that only had 2 stars, placed to the left.

The yellow patriarchal cross on the blue background refers to the order of the Benedictines at the Łysa Góra mountain, the white eagle on the red background refers to the coat of arms of the Kraków Voivodeship that existed from 14th to 18th centuries, and the bottom fields referred to the coat of arms of the Sandomierz Voivodeship.

== History ==
=== Congress Poland ===
The coat of arms of the Kielce Governorate from 1841 to 1844.

The Kielce Governorate of the Congress Poland, had been created on 23 February 1841, replacing the Kraków Governorate. It continued to use its coat of arms, which featured a white (silver) eagle with a yellow (golden) crown on his head that is turned right, a beak, legs, and a stripes on its wings, with the charge placed on the red background. Said design historically was the symbol of the Kraków Voivodeship, used from 14th to 18th centuries.

The coat of arms of the Radom Governorate from 1845 to 1866.

In 1844 the governorates of Kielce and Sandomierz, were combined together, forming the Radom Governorate. The new coat of arms of the administrative region, was the combination of the coats of arms of the two previous regions. It was horizontally divided into two divided horizontally into two halves. The top half consisted of a red background, featuring white (silver) eagle with a yellow (golden) crown on his head that is turned right, a beak, legs, and a stripes on its wings, with the charge being placed on the red background. It was based on the previous coat of arms of the Kielce Governorate. The bottom half was further vertically divided into another two fields. The left field consisted of six alternating red and white horizontal stripes, while the left field consisted of nine yellow (golden) six-armed stars, placed in three rows, each containing three stars. Together, those to field formed a design of the former Sandomierz Governorate. The coat of arms was approved by the viceroy of Poland, Ivan Paskevich, on 5 October 1845, and later, by the tsar or Russia, Nicholas I, on 26 May 1849. It remained in use until 1866.

The coat of the Kielce Governorate from 1886 to 1917.

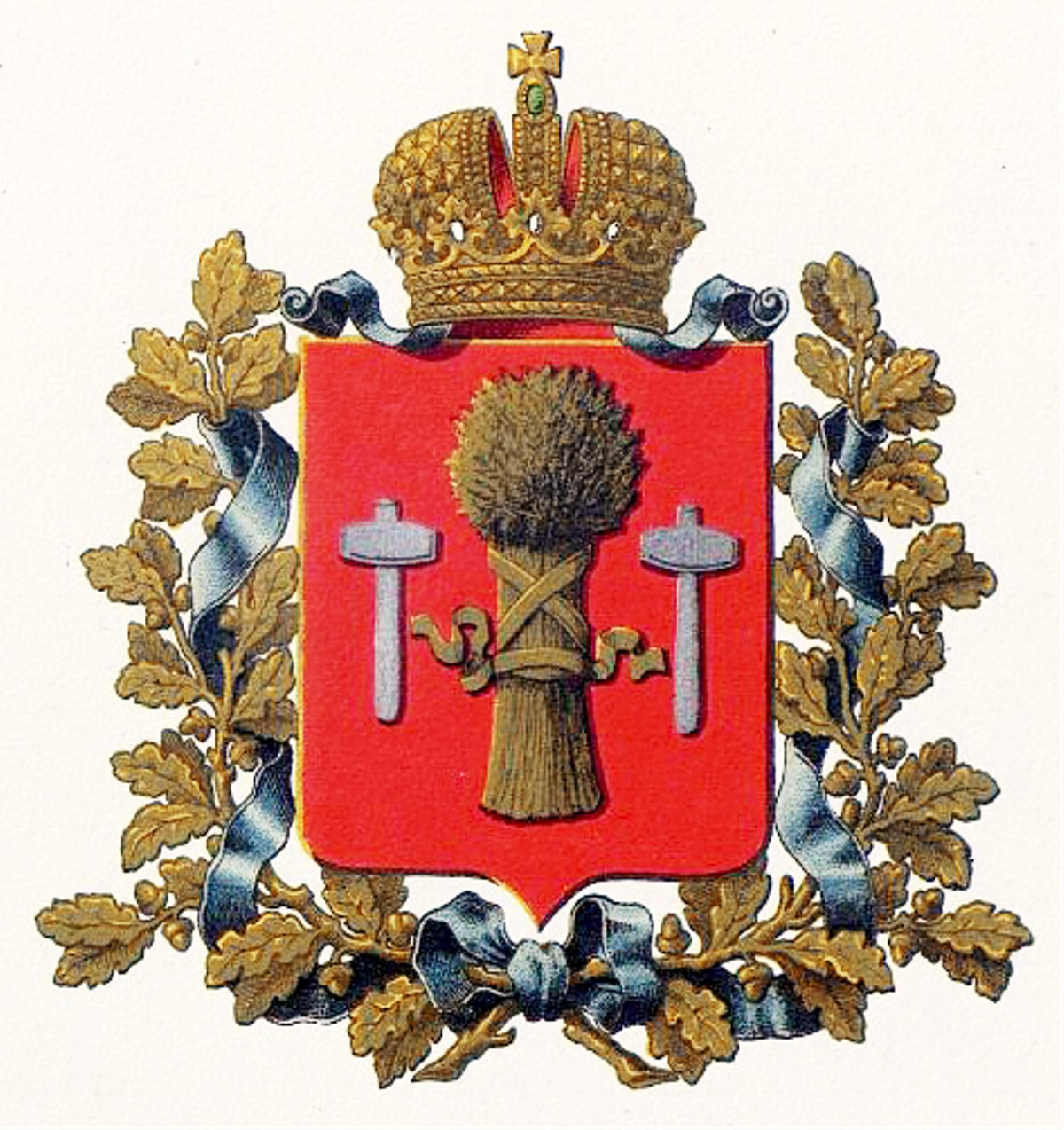
The coat of the Radom Governorate from 1886 to 1917.

The Kielce Governorate was reestablished in 1867, from the portion of the Radom Governorate. On 25 February 1869, tsar of Russia, Alexander II, had approved new coat of arms of the governorates of the Congress Poland, including Kielce and Radom Governorates.

The coat of arms of the Kielce Governorate depicted a yellow (golden) brick furnace, with a red fire burning from its opening, and its top. It was placed on a white (silver) half-oval surface. To its left, and its right were placed yellow (golden) circles, with one on each side. They were placed within a blue French-style escutcheon. Around the shield, there are yellow (golden) leaves of the oak tree, interspersed with the blue ribbon of the Order of St. Andrew. On the top of the coat of arms, above the escutcheon, there was the yellow (golden) Imperial Crown of Russia.

The coat of arms of the Radom Governorate depicted an orange (golden) sheaf of hay, tied up with an orange band, with a silver hammer placed to the left, and to the right, from the hay. They were placed within a blue French-style escutcheon. Around the shield, there are yellow (golden) leaves of the oak tree, interspersed with the blue ribbon of the Order of St. Andrew. On the top of the coat of arms, above the escutcheon, there was the yellow (golden) Imperial Crown of Russia.

Both coat of arms were used until 1915.

=== Second Polish Republic ===
The design of the coat of arms of the Kielce Voivodeship proposed in 1928.

In 1928, as part of the project to design the coat of arms for the voivodeships of the Second Polish Republic, the design for the coat of arms of the Kielce Voivodeship had been created. Though planned to be officially approved, it never was implemented, as it was decided to postpone the approval of the subdivision symbols due to the planned administrative reform, that eventually took place in 1938. Eventually, the plans for the establishment of the coat of arms had been stopped by the Invasion of Poland by Nazi Germany, on 1 September 1939, that begun the World War II, and were not picked up back after the end of the conflict.

The proposed design consisted of the escutcheon (shield) being divided horizontally into two halves. The top half consisted of a red background, featuring white (silver) eagle with a yellow (golden) crown on his head that is turned right, a beak, legs, and a stripes on its wings, with the charge being placed on the red background. It had the same design as the one used for the proposed coat of arms of the coat of arms of the Kraków Voivodeship, and which was based on a historical design of the coat of arms used by the Kraków Voivodeship of the Kingdom of Poland. The bottom half was further vertically divided into another two fields. The left field consisted of six alternating red and white horizontal stripes, while the left field consisted of nine yellow (golden) six-armed stars, placed in three rows, each containing three stars. Together, those to field formed a historical design of the coat of arms of the Sandomierz Voivodeship. The design of the coat of arms was reminiscent to the one used by the Radom Governorate of Congress Poland, from 1845 to 1869.

=== Third Polish Republic ===
The coat of arms of the Kielce Voivodeship from 1997 to 1998, and the Świętokrzyskie Voivodeship from 1999 to 2009.

The Kielce Voivodeship of the Third Republic of Poland, had established its coat of arms on 28 October 1997. It consisted of the Iberian style escutcheon, with square top and rounded base, that is divided in the 2 by 2 chessboard pattern. The top left and bottom right fields are blue, while, the top right is white, and the bottom left, consists of eight stripes, that, starting from the top, alternate between red and white colours. The top left field features a yellow patriarchal cross. The top right field features a white eagle with yellow crown, and legs. The bottom left field features nine yellow six-pointed starts, placed in three rows, each with three stars. The yellow patriarchal cross on the blue background refers to the order of the Benedictines at the Łysa Góra mountain, the white eagle on the red background refers to the coat of arms of the Kraków Voivodeship that existed from 14th to 18th centuries, and the bottom fields referred to the coat of arms of the Sandomierz Voivodeship.

The Kielce Voivodeship ceased to exist on 31 December 1998, and most of its territories were incorporated into then-established Świętokrzyskie Voivodeship. The new administrative region reestablished the design as its coat of arms on 11 October 1999, and continued to use it until 18 February 2013, when it had adopted new current version of the coat of arms, in the resolution from 28 December 2012.

== See also ==
- Flag of the Świętokrzyskie Voivodeship
- Coat of arms of the Lesser Poland Voivodeship
- Coat of arms of the Sandomierz Voivodeship
