= Coat of arms of Sandomierz Voivodeship =

Polish coat of arms

The coat of arms of the Sandomierz Voivodeship of the Kingdom of Poland, from 14th to 18th centuries.

A historical coat of arms symbolized the Sandomierz Land and Sandomierz Voivodeship of the Kingdom of Poland from the 14th to 18th centuries. It was divided into two fields, with the left field consisting of six stripes, alternating either between red and white or red and yellow, and with the right field consisting of several yellow six-pointed stars, whose number varie dbetween seven and nine.

The coat of arms was later used as the symbol of Sandomierz Voivodeship (1816–1837) and Sandomierz Governorate (1837–1841) of Congress Poland. It was part of the design of the coat of arms of Radom Governorate from 1845 to 1866. Currently, the coat of arms is included in the design of the coat of arms of Świętokrzyskie Voivodeship and the coat of arms of Sandomierz County.

== History ==
=== Kingdom of Poland ===
The banner of arms of the Sandomierz Land, used during the Battle of Grunwald in 1410.

The coat of arms originated as the symbol of the Sandomierz Land, and since the 14th century was the symbol of Sandomierz Voivodeship of the Kingdom of Poland. It consisted of an escutcheon (shield) divided vertically into two halves. The left field consisted of six alternating red and white horizontal stripes, while the left field consisted of yellow (golden) six-pointed stars, placed in three rows. The number of stars alternated over time. According to the description of the banner of arms of the Sandomierz Land, used during the Battle of Grunwald in 1410, written by Jan Długosz, the coat of arms had seven stars, distributed into three horizontal rows. Later on, the version with nine stars, distributed in the three rows, each containing three stars. The number of stars might have reflected the number of the counties of the region, which ordinally was seven, and later had risen to eight, and finally nine. The colours of the stripes also varied, with yellow stripes, also being present in various depictions, as opposed to the white stripes. Sandomierz Voivodeship ceased to exist on 1795

=== Congress Poland ===
The coat of arms of the Sandomierz Voivodeship (1816–1837), and the Sandomierz Governorate (1837–1841).

Sandomierz Voivodeship of Congress Poland was established in 1816. In 1837, it was replaced by the Sandomierz Governorate. Both of them used the coat of arms reminiscent of the design of the historical coat of arms of the region. It was divided vertically into two halves. The left field consisted of six alternating red and white horizontal stripes, while the left field consisted of nine yellow (golden) six-pointed stars, placed in three horizontal rows, each containing three stars.

The coat of arms of the Radom Governorate from 1845 to 1866.

In 1844 the governorates of Kielce and Sandomierz were combined, forming Radom Governorate. The new coat of arms of the administrative region, was the combination of the coats of arms of the two previous regions. It was horizontally divided into two divided horizontally into two halves. The top half consisted of a red background, featuring white (silver) eagle with a yellow (golden) crown on his head that is turned right, a beak, legs, and a stripes on its wings, with the charge being placed on the red background. It was based on the previous coat of arms of the Kielce Governorate. The bottom half was further vertically divided into another two fields. The left field consisted of six alternating red and white horizontal stripes, while the left field consisted of nine yellow (golden) six-armed stars, placed in three rows, each containing three stars. Together, those to field formed a design of the former Sandomierz Governorate. The coat of arms was approved by the viceroy of Poland, Ivan Paskevich, on 5 October 1845, and later, by the tsar or Russia, Nicholas I, on 26 May 1849. It remained in use until 1866.

=== Second Polish Republic ===
The design of the coat of arms of the Kielce Voivodeship proposed in 1928.

In 1928, as part of the project to design the coat of arms for the voivodeships of the Second Polish Republic, the design for the coat of arms of Kielce Voivodeship was created. Though planned to be officially approved, it never was implemented, as it was decided to postpone the approval of the subdivision symbols due to the planned administrative reform, that eventually took place in 1938. Eventually, the plans for the establishment of the coat of arms had been stopped by the Invasion of Poland by Nazi Germany, on 1 September 1939, that begun the World War II, and were not picked up back after the end of the conflict.

The proposed design consisted of the Iberian style escutcheon (shield) being divided horizontally into two halves. The top half consisted of a red background, featuring white (silver) eagle with a yellow (golden) crown on his head that is turned right, a beak, legs, and a stripes on its wings, with the charge being placed on the red background. It had the same design as the one used for the proposed coat of arms of the coat of arms of Kraków Voivodeship, and which was based on a historical design of the coat of arms used by Kraków Voivodeship of the Kingdom of Poland. The bottom half was further vertically divided into another two fields. The left field consisted of six alternating red and white horizontal stripes, while the left field consisted of nine yellow (golden) six-armed stars, placed in three rows, each containing three stars. Together, those to field formed a historical design of the coat of arms of Sandomierz Voivodeship. The design of the coat of arms was reminiscent to the one used by Radom Governorate of Congress Poland, from 1845 to 1869.

=== Third Polish Republic ===
The coat of arms of Kielce Voivodeship from 1997 to 1998 and Świętokrzyskie Voivodeship from 1999 to 2009.

The coat of arms of Świętokrzyskie Voivodeship from 2013 to present

Kielce Voivodeship of the Third Republic of Poland, had established its coat of arms on 28 October 1997. It consisted of the Iberian style escutcheon, with square top and rounded base, that is divided in the 2 by 2 chessboard pattern. The top left and bottom right fields are blue, while, the top right is white, and the bottom left, consists of eight stripes, that, starting from the top, alternate between red and white colours. The top left field features a yellow patriarchal cross. The top right field features a white eagle with yellow crown, and legs. The bottom left field features nine yellow six-pointed starts, placed in three rows, each with three stars. The yellow patriarchal cross on the blue background refers to the order of the Benedictines at the Łysa Góra mountain, the white eagle on the red background refers to the coat of arms of Kraków Voivodeship that existed from 14th to 18th centuries, and the bottom fields referred to the coat of arms of Sandomierz Voivodeship.

Kielce Voivodeship ceased to exist on 31 December 1998, and most of its territories were incorporated into the newly established Świętokrzyskie Voivodeship. The new administrative region reestablished the design as its coat of arms on 11 October 1999, and continued to use it until 18 February 2013, when it had adopted new current version of the coat of arms, in the resolution from 28 December 2012.

The coat of arms of Sandomierz County.

The historical design of the coat of arms, is currently used as the symbol of Sandomierz County, Świętokrzyskie Voivodeship. It consists of the Iberian style escutcheon, with square top and rounded base, that is divided vertically into two fields. The left field consists of six horizontal stripes, alternating between red and white (silver) colours. The right field features nine yellow (golden) six-armed stars, placed in three horizontal rows, each containing three stars. The nine stars are meant to symbolize the nine gminas (municipalities) of the county. The historical coat of arms had also inspired numerous other coats of arms of counties in the region, including the counties of Końskie, Nowy Sącz, Przysucha, Radom, Szydłowiec, and Tarnobrzeg.

== See also ==
- Coat of arms of Świętokrzyskie Voivodeship
- Symbols of Sandomierz County
