= Flag of Lesser Poland Voivodeship =

Flag of the Lesser Poland Voivodeship, Poland

Flag of the Lesser Poland Voivodeship
- Use: Lesser Poland Voivodeship
- Proportion: 5:8
- Adopted: 24 May 1999
- Design: Three horizontal stripes of white, yellow, and red, with the top and bottom stripes being twice the size of the middle one
- Designed by: Barbara Widłak; Wojciech Drelicharz; Zenon Piech

The flag of the Lesser Poland Voivodeship, Poland is a tricolour rectangle, with three horizontal stripes: white, yellow, and red, with the top and bottom stripes being twice the size of the middle one.

== Design ==
The flag of the Lesser Poland Voivodeship is a tricolour rectangle, with the aspect ratio of height to width of 5:8. It consist of three horizontal stripes: white, yellow, and red, with the top and bottom stripes being twice the size of the middle one. The proportions of the three stripes are: 2/5 for white and red, and 1/5 for yellow/gold. The colours of the flag had been adopted from the coat of arms of the Lesser Poland Voivodeship, which depicts the white eagle with a golden (yellow) crown, legs, and a band put throw his wings, located within a red escutcheon.

== History ==
The flag had been adopted by the Lesser Poland Voivodeship Sejmik, on 24 May 1999, in the resolution no. VIII/73/99. It had been designed by Barbara Widłak, Wojciech Drelicharz, and Zenon Piech.

== See also ==
- coat of arms of the Lesser Poland Voivodeship
- flag of Galicia and Lodomeria
