= Benedykt Chmielowski =

Polish priest

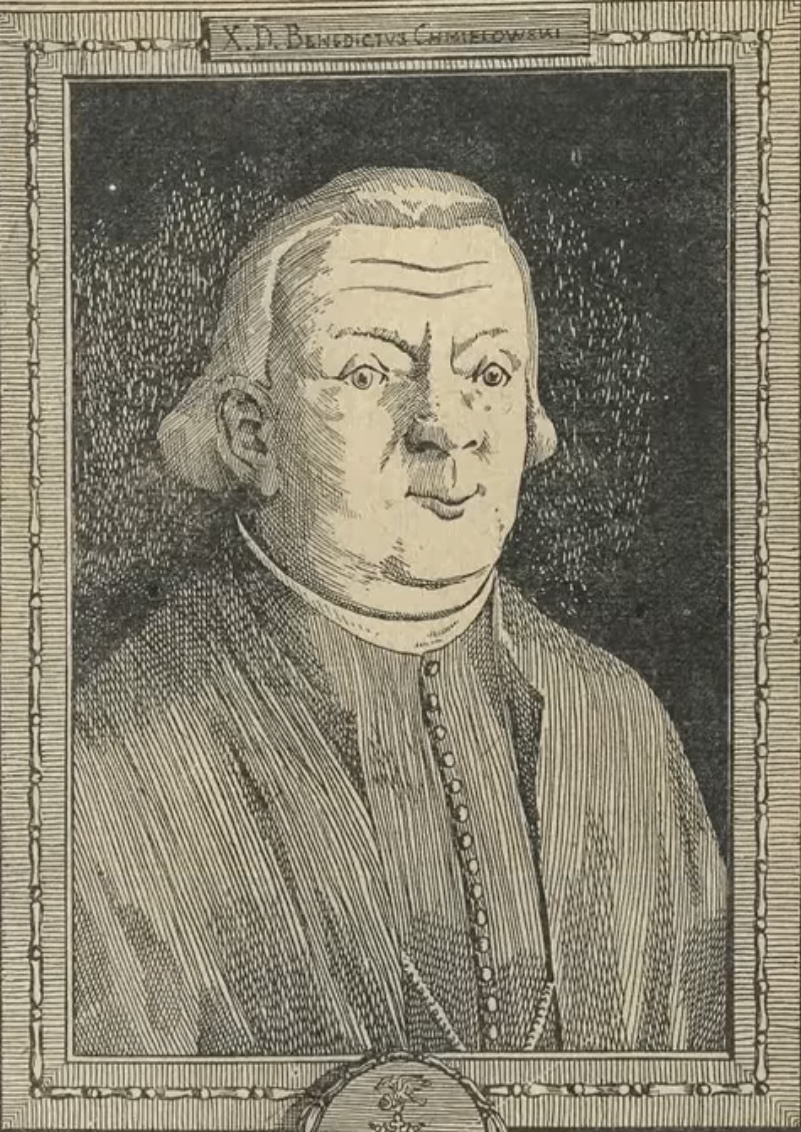
Illustration of Chmielowski found in Nowe Ateny

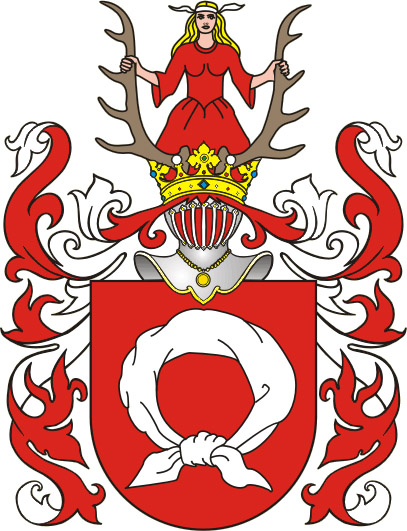
Nałęcz – Chmielowski coat of arms

Benedykt Joachim Chmielowski (1700–1763) was a Polish priest who wrote Nowe Ateny, the first Polish-language encyclopedia. It was first published in 1745-46; the second edition was supplemented between 1754 and 1764.

== Biography ==
Chmielowski was most likely born in Lutsk (Łuck), in the eastern Volhynia province of the Polish–Lithuanian Commonwealth in 1700. He studied in Jesuit schools in Lviv (then called Lwów) from the year 1715 until 1722, when he was accepted into the city's Roman Catholic Seminary. After that, as a young priest, he was appointed preceptor to Dymitr Jabłonowski from the influential Jabłonowski family. Thanks to this connection, he soon acquired the clergy house in Firlejów (Note: now called Липівка) near Rohatyn in 1725. Sometime before 1743, he became a prelate to Lviv's archbishop Mikołaj Gerard Wyżycki. During the 1750s he became a parson in Podkamień (in what is now western Ukraine) and the Dean in Rohatyn. From 1761 on he was also Kiev's canon. He lived almost his entire life at the clergy house in Firlejów and devoted himself to writing and editing Nowe Ateny. He died in Firlejów in 1763.

He is famous as the author of the first Polish-language encyclopedia, Nowe Ateny, published in Lviv in 1745-1746 and again in 1754-1756. Four volumes of the encyclopedia were eventually published. Chmielowski is also the author of the popular prayer Bieg roku całego (1728), printed in the 18th and 19th centuries. He also compiled and published a roll of arms (Zbiór krótki herbów polskich, oraz wsławionych cnotą i naukami Polaków, 1763) and authored a religious novel (Ucieczka przez świętych do Boga, 1730).

According to Wojciech Paszyński, many previous claims about Chmielowski's biography must be revised, including his birthplace and the coat of arms. Paszyński argues that there is not enough evidence to show that he was born in Łuck - he may have been from elsewhere in the Roman Catholic Diocese of Lutsk. Paszyński also says that it is an error to assign to Chmielowski the Nałęcz coat of arms; he used the Jastrzębiec coat of arms instead.

== Fictional Representation ==
A fictional version of Chmielowski appears as a character in the novel The Books of Jacob by Nobel Prize winning Polish author Olga Tokarczuk.

== Bibliography ==
- Wojciech Paszyński, Ksiądz Benedykt Chmielowski – życie i dzieło Diogenesa firlejowskiego [Father Benedict Chmielowski – the life and work of Firlejow's Diogenes], „Nasza Przeszłość” 2015/2, t. 124, pp. 105–136.
- Wojciech Paszyński, Czarna legenda „Nowych Aten” Benedykta Chmielowskiego i próby jej przezwyciężenia [Tarnished Reputation of ‘New Athens’ (first Polish encyclopedia) by Benedykt Chmielowki and Attempts of Restoring It], „Zeszyty Naukowe Uniwersytetu Jagiellońskiego. Prace Historyczne” 2014/1(141), pp. 37–59.
- Maria Wichowa (1999) Ksiądz Benedykt Chmielowski jako uczony barokowy (Napis, Seria V/1999, s. 45).
