= List of county flags in the Świętokrzyskie Voivodeship =

The following list includes flags of counties (powiat) in the Świętokrzyskie Voivodeship.

The flag of the Świętokrzyskie Voivodeship

In Poland, territorial units (municipal, city, and county councils) may establish flags in accordance with the Act of 21 December 1978 on badges and uniforms. In its original version, the act only allowed territorial units to establish coats of arms. It was not until the "Act of 29 December 1998 amending certain acts in connection with the implementation of the state system reform" that the right for provinces, counties, and municipalities to establish a flag as the symbol of their territorial unit was officially confirmed. This change benefited powiats, which were reinstated in 1999.

Since 2005, all 13 counties and the city with powiat rights (Kielce) in the Świętokrzyskie Voivodeship have their own flags. This flag was established by the Voivodeship itself in 2001 (the design was changed in 2013).

== List of county flags ==
=== Cities with powiat rights ===
County	Flag	Description
City of Kielce		The city flag was established by resolution nr VII/76/2019 of 21 February 2019. It is a rectangular flag with proportions of 5:8, divided into three horizontal strips: two yellow and one red win the ratio of 1:8:1. The emblem from the town's coat of arms is placed on the left side of the flag.

=== Counties ===
County	Flag	Description
Powiat buski		The county flag, designed by Dr Jerzy Micht, was established by resolution nr XXII/134/2001 of 23 April 2001. It is a rectangular flag with proportions of 5:8, divided into three vertical strips: yellow, blue and red in the ratio of 1:2:1. W jego centralnej części umieszczono godło z herbu powiatu.
Powiat jędrzejowski		The county flag, designed by Dr Jerzy Micht, was established by resolution nr XXII/142/01 of 5 April 2001. It is a recangular flag with proportions of 5:8, blue in colour, in the top left corner of the flag the emblem from the county coat of arms is displayed.
Powiat kazimierski		The first version of the flag was established by resolution nr XX/154/2005 of 26 April 2005, the current flag was established by resolution nr XXII/171/2009 of 6 November 2009. It is a rectangular flag with proportions of 5:8, divided into two equal vertical strips: red and blue. In both strips the emblems from the county coat of arms are displayed.
Powiat kielecki		The first version of the county flag, designed by Dr Jerzy Micht, was established by resolution nr X/23/99 of 30 June1999, currently it is established by resolution nr XIX/56/2016 of 26 September 2016. It is a rectangular flag with proportions of 5:7, blue in colour, in the centre of which the emblem from the county coat of arms is displayed.
Powiat konecki		The county flag, designed by Krzysztof Dorcz, was established by resolution nr XII/54/99 of 10 November 1999. It is a rectangular flag with proportions of 5:8, divided into four equal horizontal strips: red, white, yellow and blue.
Powiat opatowski		The county flag was established by resolution nr XX/103/2000 of 12 July 2000. It is a rectangular flag with proportions of 5:8, divided into three vertical strips: two red and one white in the ratio of 1:3:1. In the central part of which the county coat of arms is placed.
Powiat ostrowiecki		The county flag, designed by Dr Jerzy Micht, was established by resolution nr V/31/2003 of 24 January 2003. It is a rectangular flag with proportions of 5:8, divided into two equal vertical strips: red and blue. On both strips the county coat of arms is displayed.
Powiat pińczowski		The municipal flag was established by resolution nr XXIII/112/2001 of 26 June 2001. It is a rectangular flag with proportions of 5:8, blue in colour, In the top left of which the emblem from the county coat of arms is displayed.
Powiat sandomierski		The county flag is a muninicipal flag with proportions of 5:8, divided into three vertical strips: two blue and one yellow in the ratio of 1:3:1. In the centre of which the county coat of arms is displayed.
Powiat skarżyski		The county flag, designed by Dr Jerzy Micht, was established on 13 września 1999. Is a rectangular flag with the ratio of 5:7, divided into two equal horizontal strips: red and blue. On both strips emblems from the county coat of arms are displayed.
Powiat starachowicki		The county flag was established by resolution nr XVII/196/2000 of 23 November 2000. It is a rectangular flag with proportions of 5:8, blue in colour, in the centre of which the emblem from the county coat of arms is displayed.
Powiat staszowski		The municipal flag, designed by Jerzy Bąk, was established by resolution nr XXXI/41/02 of 8 July 2002. It is a rectangular flag with proportions of 5:8, blue in colour, in the centre of which the emblem from the
Powiat włoszczowski		The first version of the flag was established by resolution nr XVII/147/01 of 10 November 2001, currently is established by resolution nr XXIII/129/09 of 9 February 2009. It is a rectangular flag with proportions of 5:8, divided into two equal horizontal strips: blue and red. On both strips the emblems from the county coat of arms are displayed.

== See also ==
- List of municipal flags in the Świętokrzyskie Voivodeship
