= Erazm Jerzmanowski =

Polish industrialist, participant of January Uprising (1844–1909)

Erazm Józef Jerzmanowski
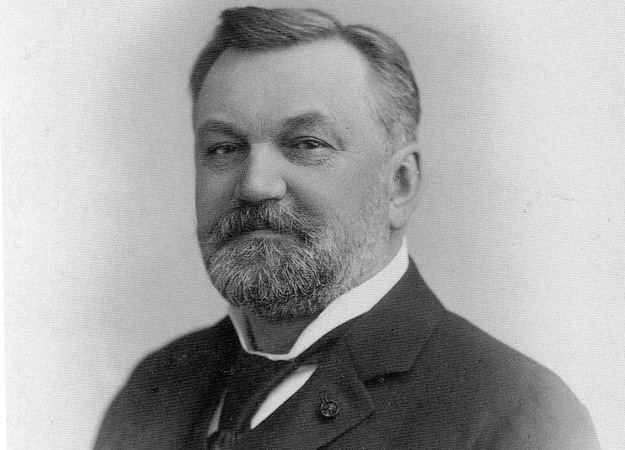
- Born: 2 June 1844; Tomisławice
- Died: 7 February 1909 (aged 64); Prokocim (present-day Kraków, Poland)
- Citizenship: United States
- Spouse: Anna Koester Jerzmanowska
- Parent(s): Franciszek Jerzmanowski and Apolonia Kamila Kosowska

Erazm Józef Jerzmanowski Dołęga coat of arms (2 June 1844 – 7 February 1909) was an industrialist, philanthropist and patron of art, soldier, who took part in the January Uprising of 1863–1865.

== Biography ==
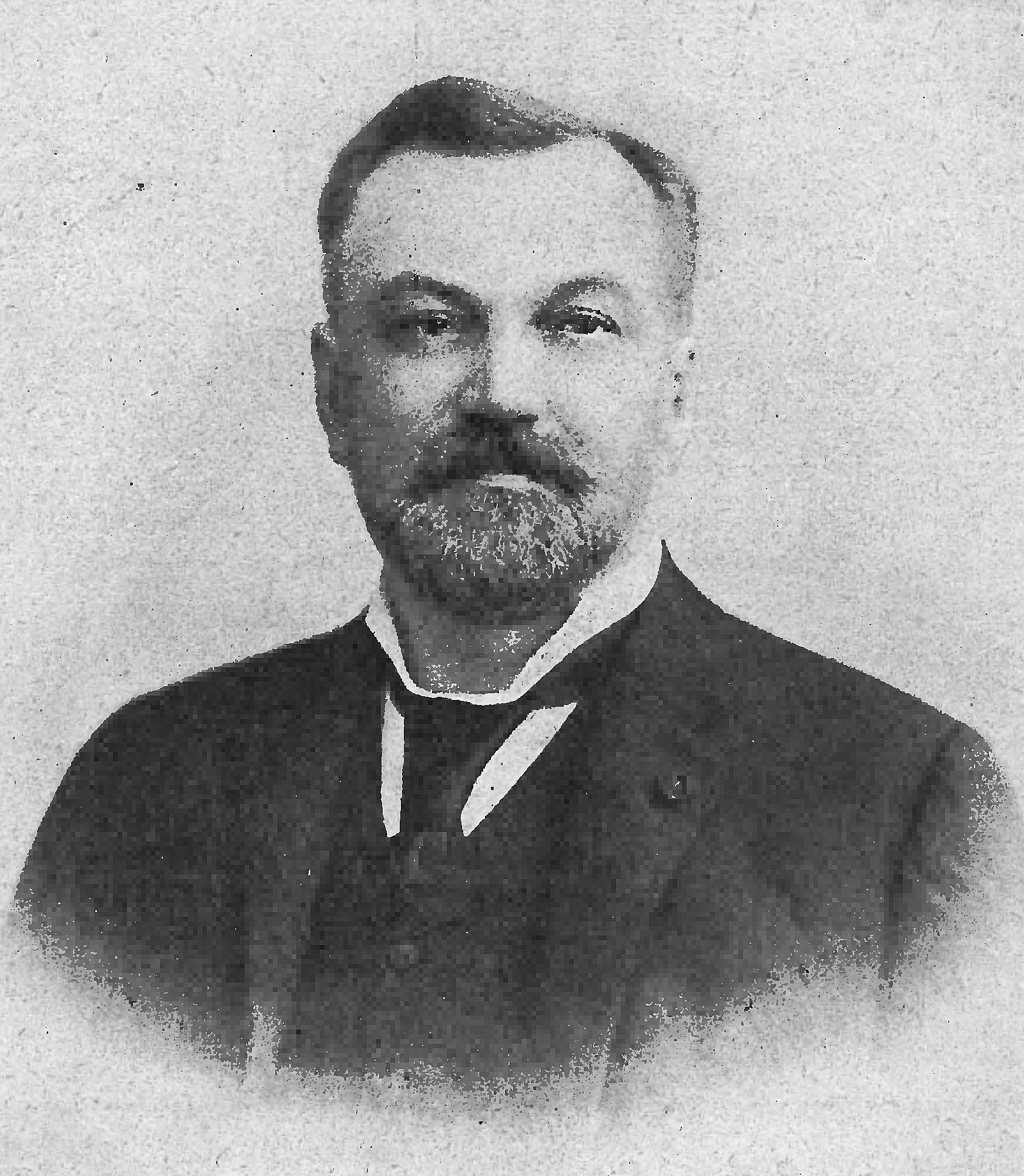
Erazm Jerzmanowski

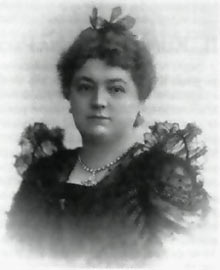
Anna Jerzmanowska

Born to Franciszek Jerzmanowski and Apolonia Kamila Kosowska, Erazm graduated from high school in Warsaw in 1862, and then began education at Polytechnic Institute in Puławy.

With other students he joined the January Uprising in 1863. He fought under commands of general Marian Langiewicz. After the uprising failed, he was interned in the castle of Olomouc in Galicia.

Jerzmanowski was set free and forced to go abroad. He went to Paris for emigration in 1864 and studied at the Polish School in Montparnasse. Later he moved to Metz to study at the School of Engineering and Artillery. In 1870 he participated in the Franco-Prussian War as an officer of the French Army.

After the war he began working as an engineer. In 1873, a French company, which had been exploiting lighting-gas in America, sent him to the United States. Shortly after going to the USA Jerzmanowski married Anna Koester. In 1879, he became a United States citizen. He worked on production of the calcium carbide, in the meantime patenting 17 inventions in the field of mining and investing money.

In 1882 he was a co-founder of Equitable Gas Light Company in New York, as a vice-chairman and later chairman where he led this company for 13 years. He was a founder of gas companies in Chicago and Baltimore and owned gas factories in Indianapolis. His fortune grew fast, he became the richest Polish in the United States and one of the richest Americans. Being one of the most influential directors in gas industry he has been supporting financially other people of American Polonia. In 1889 pope Leo XIII decorated him with Knight Commander of Order of St. Sylvester. In 1896 Jerzmanowski bought a palace in Galicia and settled in Prokocim, near Kraków, where he died in 1909.

== Legacy ==
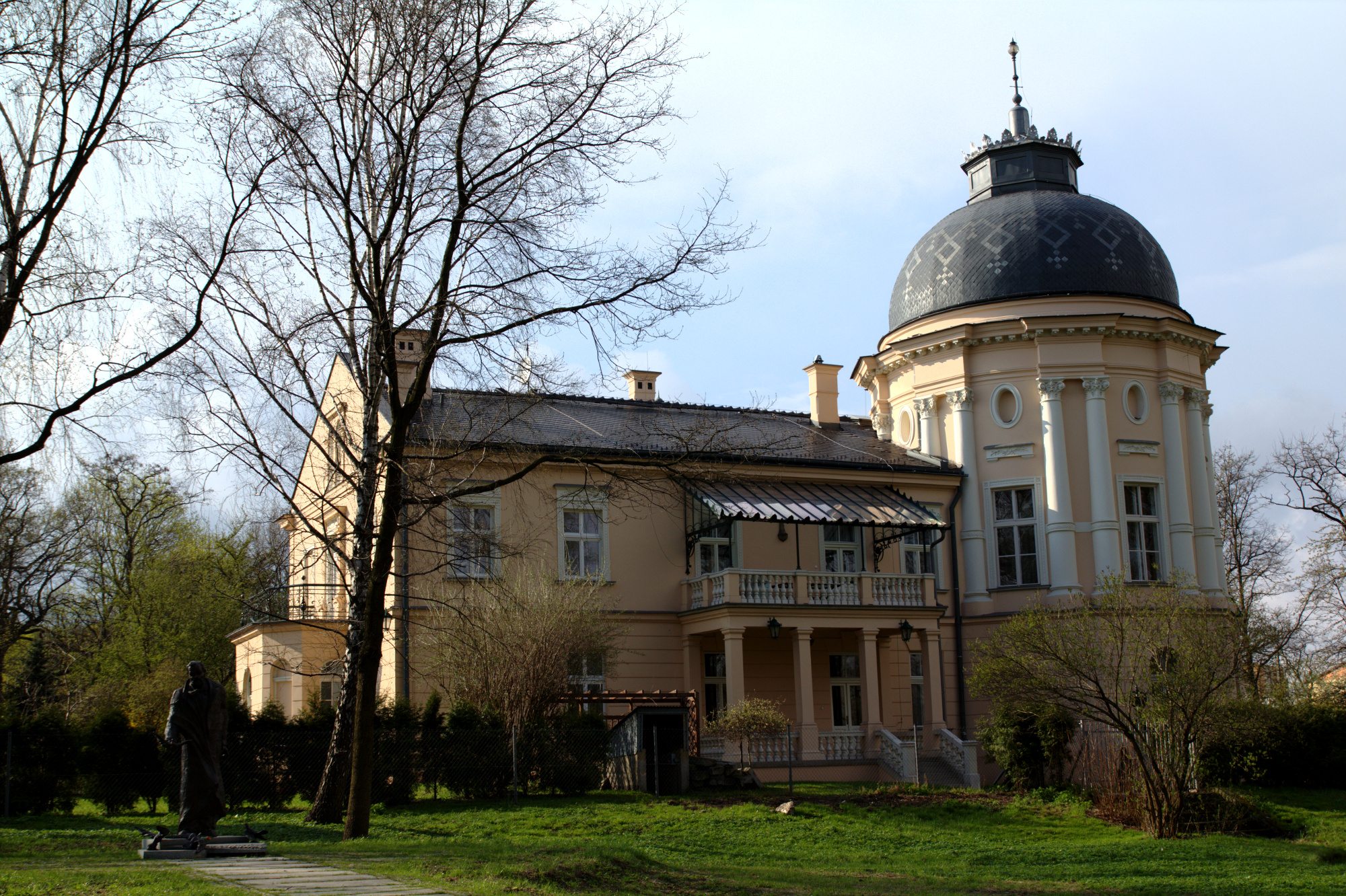
Jerzmanowscy Palace in the Jerzmanowscy Park in Prokocim, in Kraków

The palace that Jerzmanowski bought in 1896, currently better known as the Jerzmanowscy Palace, is located in Prokocim. The surrounding park – Anna and Erazm Jerzmanowski Park – was named after its owners.

=== Jerzmanowscy Award ===
In his last will, Jerzmanowski presented all his wealth to Academy of Learning in Kraków. He ordered the academy to establish the foundation and the award named after him and his wife. People distinguished with Jerzmanowscy Award had to be Polish Roman Catholics who had served Poland with their artistic, scientific or social activities. Payments are made from Jerzmanowski's funds.

== Bibliography ==
- Więch, Arkadiusz Stanisław (2019). Polski Nobel. Działalność Erazma Józefa Jerzmanowskiego i dzieje fundacji jego imienia (do 1938 r.). Historia Iagellonica. ISBN 978-83-66304-11-6. Review: Pudłocki, Tomasz (2020). "Erazm Józef Jerzmanowski (1844–1909). Biography of the Great Polish Patriot of the 19th Century". Biuletyn Polskiej Misji Historycznej (15): 317–324. ISSN 2391-792X. Archived from the original on 16 October 2023.
