= Wojciech Paszyński =

Polish historian

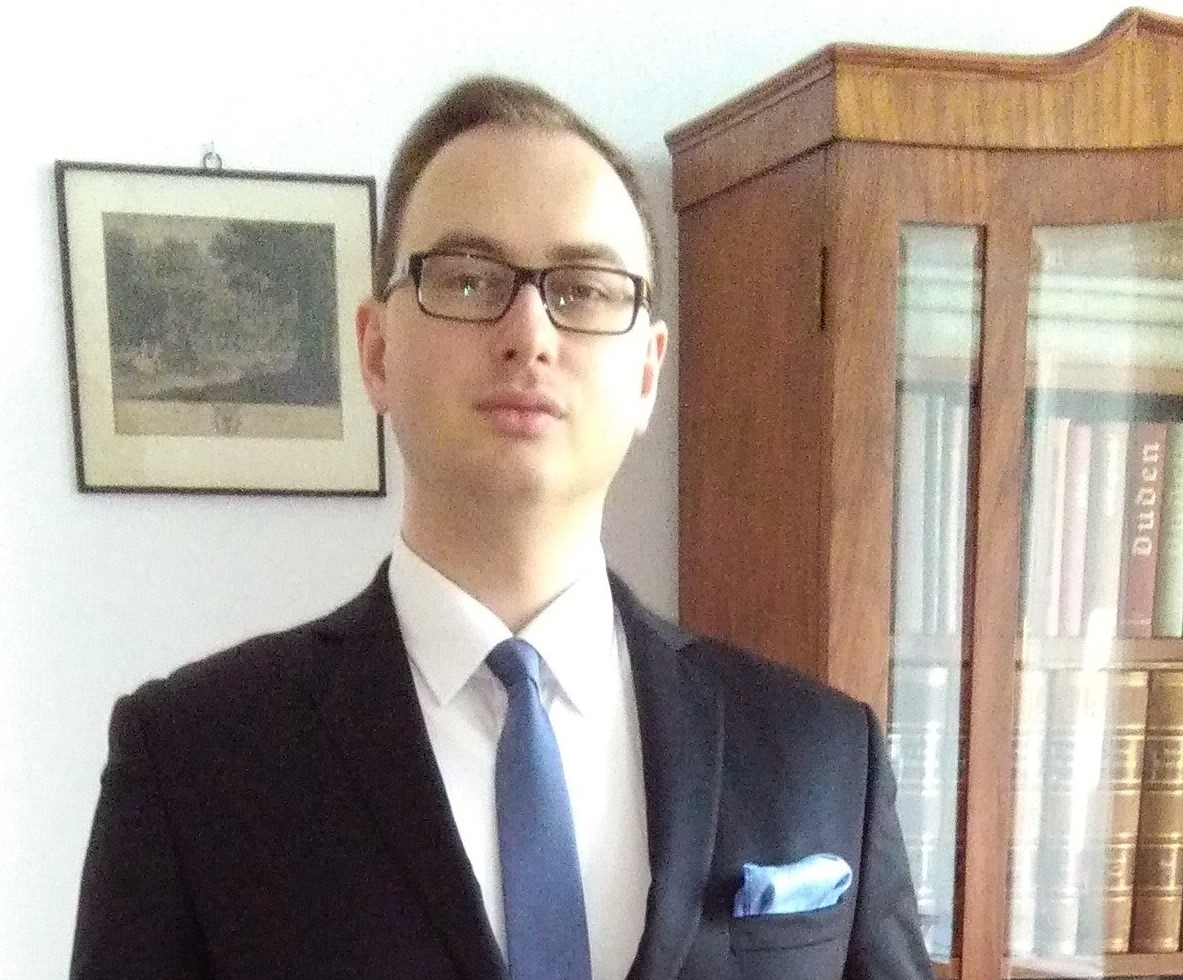
- Born: Wojciech Lucjan Paszyński; 5 July 1985 (age 41); Warsaw, Mazovia, Poland
- Education: Jagiellonian University, Adam Mickiewicz University
- Scientific career
- Fields: History
- Workplaces: AGH University of Science and Technology
- Doctoral advisor: Maciej Forycki
- Other academic advisors: Krzysztof Stopka
- Website: paszynski.com

Wojciech Lucjan Paszyński (born 5 July 1985) is a Polish historian specializing in the history of science.

== Education ==
Paszyński studied at the Jagiellonian University and at the Adam Mickiewicz University, where he obtained a PhD in history (2015).

== Career ==
Paszyński lectured on the history of medicine at AFMKU (2016-2019). Since 2019, he has been a lecturer in the history of economic thought at the AGH University of Science and Technology.

== Academic interests ==
Wojciech Paszyński created the term Vandalianism for describing the Polish paranational concept based on the belief that the Poles descended from the Vandals.

His scientific research focuses on the history of science, history of medicine, history of economic thought, historiography, ethnogenesis of Slavs and the culture of Polish nobility, with particular emphasis on the phenomenon of Sarmatism.

Paszyński explored the subject of the first Polish encyclopedia (older than the Encyclopédie) known as New Athens (Nowe Ateny).

Paszyński researched the issues of ethnogenesis of Poles in medieval and early modern historiography. In his book Sarmaci i uczeni (2016) he dealt primarily with the Sarmatian theory. In his subsequent book Wandalia (2019), he focused directly on the Vandal theory, which was the first monographic study on this phenomenon.

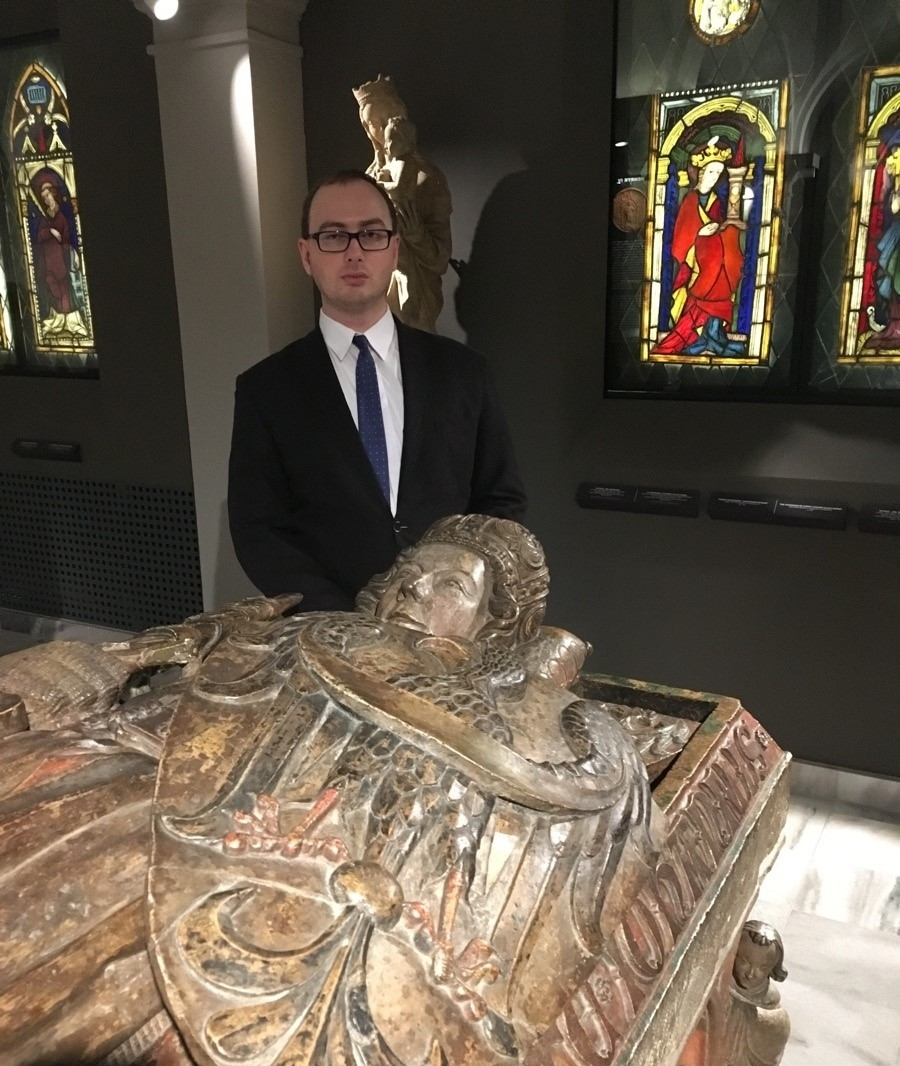
Dr. Wojciech Paszyński at the National Museum in Wrocław

== Publications ==
- Paszyński W., Niesamowici Polacy. Pionierzy, wynalazcy, zdobywcy [The Incredible Poles], 2023.
- Paszyński W., Sarmatia and Vandalia. Introduction to the Polish Paranational Concepts, [in:] Słowiańszczyzna dawniej i dziś – język, literatura, kultura. Monografia ze studiów slawistycznych, vol. 5, A. Kołodziej, M. Ślawska, A. Ursulenko, B. Juszczak (Eds.), Wrocław 2022, pp. 371–377.
- Paszyński W., „Edeljude” i cudowne ocalenie — przypadek bliskiej relacji Adolfa Hitlera z żydowskim lekarzem Eduardem Blochem (1872-1945) ["Edeljude" and the Miraculous Salvation — the Case of a Close Relationship Between Adolf Hitler and the Jewish Doctor Eduard Bloch (1872–1945)], „Radzyński Rocznik Humanistyczny”, vol. 19/2021, pp. 89–98.
- Paszyński W., Wyznania lekarza sprzed trzydziestu trzech wieków. „Egipcjanin Sinuhe” Miki Waltariego w ocenie czytelników i uczonych [Confessions of a Doctor from Thirty-Three Centuries Ago. Mika Waltari’s The Egyptian in the Reading Public Opinion and Scientific Reception], [in:] Lekarz jako autor i bohater literacki [Doctor as an Author and Literary Figure], E. Białek & D. Lewera (Eds.), Wrocław 2019, pp. 161–184.
- Paszyński W., Wandalia. Najstarsza wizja pradziejów Polski [Vandalia. The Oldest Vision of Poland's Prehistory], Sandomierz 2019.
- Paszyński W., Polska jako Wandalia. Koncepcja wandalska w dziejopisarstwie polskim wieków średnich [Poland as Vandalia. Vandalian Concept in the Polish Historiography of Medieval Times], „Orbis Linguarum” vol. 51/2018, pp. 357–390.
- Paszyński W., Sarmaci i uczeni. Spór o pochodzenie Polaków [Sarmatians and Scholars. Dispute over the Origin of the Poles], Kraków 2016.
- Paszyński W., Etos wymarły czy wiecznie żywy? Szlachetność i rycerskość a kultura masowa [The Ethos Extinct or Alive Forever? Nobility and Chivalry versus Media Culture], [in:] Natura – Człowiek – Kultura [Nature – Human – Culture], Katarzyna Potyrała, Andrzej Kornaś, Małgorzata Kłyś (Eds.), Kraków 2017, pp. 143–154.
- Paszyński W., Polska jako "Antemurale" i "Ojczyzna świętych". Motyw przedmurza w "Nowych Atenach" księdza Chmielowskiego [Poland as "Antemurale" and "Homeland of Saints". Theme of 'Bulwark' in the 'New Athens' by Benedict Chmielowski], "Nasza Przeszłość" 2017/1, t. 127, pp. 185–199.
- Paszyński W., Celnik H., Dziegieć drzewny w lecznictwie medycznym w Polsce [Wood Tar in the Polish Medical Treatment], „Medycyna nowożytna. Studia nad kulturą medyczną” 2016/2(22), pp. 109–125.
- Paszyński W., Ksiądz Benedykt Chmielowski – życie i dzieło Diogenesa firlejowskiego [Father Benedict Chmielowski – the life and work of Firlejow's Diogenes], "Nasza Przeszłość" 2015/2, t. 124, pp. 105–136.
- Paszyński W., Czarna legenda "Nowych Aten" Benedykta Chmielowskiego i próby jej przezwyciężenia [Tarnished Reputation of 'New Athens' (first Polish encyclopedia) by Benedykt Chmielowki and Attempts of Restoring It], "Prace Historyczne Uniwersytetu Jagiellońskiego" 2014/1(141), pp. 37–59.
