= Jerzy Wyrozumski =

Polish historian (1930–2018)

- Born: 7 March 1930; Trembowla
- Died: 2 November 2018 (aged 88); Kraków
- Resting place: Rakowicki Cemetery
- Citizenship: Polish
- Occupations: medievalist, academic teacher
- Employer: Jagiellonian University

Academic background
- Education: Jagiellonian University
- Doctoral advisor: Roman Grodecki

Jerzy Lesław Wyrozumski (7 March 1930 – 2 November 2018) was a historian, medievalist, professor at the Jagiellonian University, in the years 1981–1986 dean of the Faculty of Philosophy and History of the Jagiellonian University, in the years 1987–1990 Vice-Rector of the Jagiellonian University, organizer, member and, in the years 1994–2015, secretary general of the revived Polish Academy of Arts and Sciences, between 1980 and 2015 president of the Towarzystwo Miłośników Historii i Zabytków Krakowa.

He graduated in history from the Jagiellonian University in 1955. In 1963 he obtained doctorate upon thesis Tkactwo małopolskie w wiekach średnich (Weaving in Lesser Poland in the Middle Ages) supervised by Roman Grodecki.

His doctoral students included: Krzysztof Ożóg (1987), Krzysztof Stopka (1992), Lidia Korczak (1995), Stanisław A. Sroka (1995), Marek Daniel Kowalski (1999), Wojciech Drelicharz (2001) and Andrzej Marzec (2003).

Krzysztof Ożóg wrote that Jerzy Wyrozumski "was a man of great wisdom, kindness and modesty, with a deep love for truth and science."

== Works ==
- Dzieje Polski piastowskiej (VIII wiek – 1370 r.) – vol. 2 of the series Wielka Historia Polski
- Historia Polski do 1505
- Kazimierz Wielki
- Dzieje Krakowa, vol. 1
- Dzieje Polski późnośredniowiecznej (1370–1506)
- Dzieje Polski średniowiecznej
- Kronika Krakowa
- Państwowa gospodarka solna w Polsce do schyłku XIV w.
- Tkactwo małopolskie w późnym średniowieczu
- Beginki i begardzi w Polsce
- Związki czeladnicze w Polsce średniowiecznej
- Horyzont polityczny Jana z Czarnkowa
- Legenda pruska o świętym Wojciechu

== Awards ==
- Doctor honoris causa of the Kazimierz the Great Academy in Bydgoszcz (2005)
- Commander's Cross of Polonia Restituta (1998)
- Officer's Cross of Hungarian Order of Merit (2011)
- Nagroda Lednickiego Orła Piastowskiego (2015)
- Gold Medal „Plus ratio quam vis” (2015)
- Medal świętego Krzysztofa (2015)
