= Flag of Świętokrzyskie Voivodeship =

Flag of the Świętokrzyskie Voivodeship, Poland

Flag of the Świętokrzyskie Voivodeship
- Use: Świętokrzyskie Voivodeship
- Adopted: 18 February 2013

The flag of the Świętokrzyskie Voivodeship, Poland is a rectangle divided into four parts. Its left part features a yellow vertical stripe, which wight equals to 1:4 of the wight of the flag. Its right part is divided into three horizontal stripes, that are, from top to bottom: blue, white, and red. In the middle of the white stripe is placed the coat of arms of the voivodeship. The first version of the flag had been adopted in 2001, and current version is used since 2013.

== Design ==
The flag of the Świętokrzyskie Voivodeship is a rectangle divided into four parts. Its left part features a yellow vertical stripe, which wight equals to 1:4 of the wight of the flag. Its right part is divided into three horizontal stripes, that are, from top to bottom: blue, white, and red. The middle white stripe is four times bigger that the top and bottom stripes.

In the middle of the white stripe is placed the coat of arms of the voivodeship. The coat of arms is an Iberian style escutcheon, with square top and rounded base, that is divided in the 2 by 2 chessboard pattern. The top left and bottom right fields are blue, while, the top right is white, and the bottom left, consists of eight stripes, that, starting from the top, alternate between red and white colours. The top left field features a yellow patriarchal cross. The top right field features a white eagle with yellow crown, beak, legs, stripes on its wings, and a ring on its tail. The bottom left field features eight yellow six-pointed starts, placed in three rows, each with three stars, with the exception of the bottom row, that only had 2 stars, placed to the left.

== History ==
The first version of the flag of the Świętokrzyskie Voivodeship, used from 2001 to 2013.

The first version of the flag had been adopted on 28 May 2001, by the Świętokrzyskie Voivodeship Sejmik. It was a rectangle with the aspect ratio of its height to its width being equal to 5:7, that is divided into four parts. Its left part features a yellow vertical stripe, which width equals to 1:5 of the width of the flag. Its right part was divided into three equal horizontal stripes, that were, from top to bottom: blue, white, and red. The middle white stripe was placed the coat of arms of the voivodeship, that was an Iberian style escutcheon, with square top and rounded base, that is divided in the 2 by 2 chessboard pattern. The top left and bottom right fields are blue, while, the top right is white, and the bottom left, consists of eight stripes, that, starting from the top, alternate between red and white colours. The top left field features a yellow patriarchal cross. The top right field features a white eagle with yellow crown, and legs. The bottom left field features nine yellow six-pointed starts, placed in three rows, each with three stars.

The colours of the flag originated from the coat of arms of the voivodeship. The design of the coat of arms was originally used as a symbol of the Kielce Voivodeship from 1997 to 1998, and was again adopted on 11 October 1999, as the coat of arms of the Świętokrzyskie Voivodeship. The yellow patriarchal cross on the blue background refers to the order of the Benedictines at the Łysa Góra mountain. The white eagle on the red background refers to the coat of arms of the Kraków Voivodeship that existed from 14th to 18th centuries. The bottom fields refers to the coat of arms of the Sandomierz Voivodeship.

On 18 February 2013, the Świętokrzyskie Voivodeship Sejmik had adopted new versions of the flag and the coat of arms, in the resolution from 28 December 2012. They had kept similar design however with a few changes. The redesign of the flag included changing the aspect ratio of height to width, changing the sizes of the stripes, and the size of the coat of arms. The new design of the coat of arms included more detailed charges, and change of the number starts from nine to eight.

== See also ==
- coat of arms of the Świętokrzyskie Voivodeship
