= List of municipal flags in the Świętokrzyskie Voivodeship =

Province in southeastern Poland

Flag of the Świętokrzyskie Voivodeship

The following list includes flags of municipalities (gminy) in the Świętokrzyskie Voivodeship. According to the definition, a flag is a sheet of fabric of a specific shape, colour and meaning, attached to a spar or mast. It may also include the coat of arms or emblem of the administrative unit concerned. In Poland, territorial units (municipal, city and county councils) may establish flags in accordance with the Act of 21 December 1978 on badges and uniforms. In its original version, it only allowed territorial units to establish coats of arms.

Despite that many cities and municipalities adopted resolutions and used a flag as their symbol. It was not until the Act of 29 December 1998 amending certain acts in connection with the implementation of the state system reform that the right of voivodeships, counties and municipalities to establish this symbol of a territorial unit was officially confirmed. In 2026, 49 out of 102 municipalities in the Świętokrzyskie Voivodeship have their own flag. This flag was established by the Voivodeship itself in 2001 (the design was changed in 2013).

== List of Municipal flags ==
=== Busko County ===
Municipality	Flag	Description
Gmina Solec-Zdrój		The municipal flag was established by resolution nr XXXIX/222/2018 of 28 March 2018. It is a rectangular flag with proportions of 5:8, blue in colour, in the centre of the flag the municipal coat of arms is displayed.
Gmina Tuczępy		The municipal flag was established by resoution nr III/36/2003 of 31 March 2003. It is a rectangular flag with proportions of 5:8, divided into two equal vertical strips: blue and red. In both strips of the flag symbols from the municipal coat of arms is placed.

=== Jędrzejów County ===
Municipality	Flag	Description
City of Małogoszcz and gmina Małogoszcz		The municipal flag was established by resolution nr 28/243/06 of 22 June 2006. It is a rectangular flag with proportions of 5:8, red in colour, in the centre of the flag the emblem from the municipal coat of arms is displayed.
Gmina Nagłowice		The municipal flag, designed by Dr. Jerzy Micht, was established by resolution nr XXVIII/178/2004 of 29 December 2004. It is a rectangular flag with proportions of 5:8, red in colour, in the centre of which the emblem from the municipal coat of arms is displayed.
Gmina Słupia		The municipal flag was established by resolution nr XVII/104/2004 of 30 October 2004. It is a rectangular flag with proportions of 5:8, red in colour, in the centre of which emblem of the municipal coat of arms is displayed.
City of Sobków and gmina Sobków		The municipal flag was established by resolution nr XXI/209/01 of 21 April 2001. It is a rectangular flag with proportions of 5:8, divided into horizontal strips: red and white. In the lower left corner, there is a standing deer, taken from the municipality's coat of arms.

=== Kazimierza County ===
Municipality	Flag	Description
Gmina Bejsce		The municipal flag was established by resolution nr XVII/96/2005 of 30 March 2005. It is a rectangular flag with proportions of 5:8, blue in colour, in the centreal part of the flag the emblem from the municipal coat of arms are displayed.
Gmina Czarnocin		The municipal flag was established by resolution nr XV/70/2004 of 30 March 2004. It is a rectangular flag with proportions of 5:8, red in colour, un the central part of the flag the emblem from the municipal coat of arms is displayed.
City of Opatowiec and gmina Opatowiec		The municipal flag was established by resolution nr XLI/273/2014 of 30 April 2014. It is a rectangular flag with proportions of 2:3, yellow in colour with a diagonal blue stripe running from the top left corner.
City of Skalbmierz and gmina Skalbmierz		The municipal flag, designed by Henryk Seroka, was established by resolution nr XLVII/228/2021 of 30 December 2021. It is a rectangular flag with proportions of 5:8, in the centre of which the emblem from the municipal coat of arms is displayed.

=== City of Kielce ===
Flag	Description
	The city flag was established by resolution nr VII/76/2019 of 21 February 2019. It is a rectangular flag with proportions of 5:8, divided into three horizontal strips: two yellow and one red win the ratio of 1:8:1. The emblem from the town's coat of arms is placed on the left side of the flag.

=== Kielce County ===
Municipality	Flag	Description
Gmina Bieliny		The municipal flag, designed by Jerzy Micht, was established by resolution nr XIX/34/2000 of 18 December 2000. It is a rectangular flag with proportions of 5:8, divided into three vertical strips: two yellow and one red in the ratio of 1:2:1. In the central part of the flag the emblem from the municipal coat of arms is displayed.
City of Chęciny and gmina Chęciny		The municipal flag was established by resolution nr 199/XXII/20 of 30 March 2020. It is a rectangular flag with proportions of 5:8, red in colour, in the central part of the flag the emblem from the municipal coat of arms is displayed.
Gmina Górno		The municipal flag, designed by Jerzey Micht, was established by resolution nr XXIX/223/01 of 14 July 2001. It is a rectangular flag with proportions of 5:8, divided into two equal horizontal strips: red and white. on both strips emblems from the municipal coat of arms are displayed.
Gmina Miedziana Góra		The municipal flag is a rectangular flag with proportions of 7:12, divided into five horizontal strips: blue, white, copper red, white and green in the ratio of 4:1:4:1:4.
Gmina Mniów		The municipal flag, designed by Jerzy Micht, was established by resolution nr 12/XVI/04 of 29 April 2004. It is a rectangular flag with proportions of 5:8, on which the emblem and the upper band of the municipality's coat of arms are placed.
City of Morawica andgmina Morawica		The municipal flag, designed by Jerzy Micht, was established by resolution nr XXVII/248/09 of 5 March 2009. It is a rectangular flag with proportions of 5:8, divided into two equal vertical strips: red and blue. Symbols from the municipality's coat of arms were placed on them.
Gmina Nowiny		The municipal flag, designed by Jerzy Micht, was established by resolution nr XXVI/177/04 of 27 October 2004. It is a rectangular flag with proportions of 5:8, divided into two parts: red and blue by a white diagonal stripe. Elements from the municipality's coat of arms are placed on both parts.
City of Piekoszów and gmina Piekoszów		The municipal flag was established by resolution nr VIII/48/2000 of 22 December 2000. It is a rectangular flag with proportions of 5:7, divided into three horizontal strips: white, red and blue in the ratio of 2:1:2. In the white strip of the flag the municipal coat of arms is displayed.
City of Pierzchnica and gmina Pierzchnica		The flag of the municipality was established on the 26 April 1998. It is a rectangular flag with proportions of 5:8, divided into three equal horizontal strips: white, red and yellow.

=== Końskie County ===
Municipality	Flag	Description
Gmina Fałków		The municipal flag was established on the 9 December 2000. It is a rectangular flag with proportions of 5:8, divided into three horizontal strips: blue, white and red in the ratio of 2:1:2.
City of Gowarczów and Gmina Gowarczów		The municipal flag, designed by Krzysztof Dorcz, was established by resolution nr XXXIV/257/2017 of 29 January 2017. It is a rectangular flag with proportions of 5:8, blue in colour, in the central part of which emblem from the municipal coat of arms is displayed.
City of Radoszyce and Gmina Radoszyce		The municipal flag, designed by Kamil Wójcikowski and Robert Fidura, was established by resolution nr XXXVII/222/2013 of 28 December 2013. It is a rectangular flag with proportions of 5:8, white in colour, in the central part of which the emblem from the municipal coat of arms is displayed.
Gmina Ruda Maleniecka		The municipal flag, designed by Krzysztof Dorcz, was established by resolution nr IV/33/2011 of 29 April 2011. It is a rectangular flag with proportions of 5:8, green in colour, in the centre of which the emblem from the municipal coat of arms is displayed.
Gmina Słupia Konecka		The municipal flag, designed by Krzysztof Dorcz, was established by nr XX/122/2016 of 14 June 2016. It is a rectangular flag with proportions of 5:8, red in colour, in the centre of which the emblem from the municipal coat of arms is displayed.
Gmina Smyków		The municipal flag was established by resolution nr 235/XXXVI/2018 of 15 October 2018. It is a rectangular flag with proportions of 5:8, green in colour, in the centre of which is the emblem from the municipality's coat of arms.

=== Opatów County ===
Municipality	Flag	Description
City of Iwaniska and Gmina Iwaniska		The municipal flag was established by resolution nr XXVI/241/08 of 26 June 2008. It is a rectangular flag with proportions of 5:8, blue in colour, in the centre of which is the emblem from the municipality's coat of arms.
City of Ożarów and Gmina Ożarów		The municipal flag was established by resolution nr XXX/195/2005 of 26 April 2005. It is a rectangular flag with proportions of 5:8, yellow in colour, in the centre of which is the emblem from the municipality's coat of arms.

=== Ostrowiec County ===
Municipality	Flag	Description
Gmina Bałtów		The municipal flag was established by resolution nr XXVII/168/2012 of 11 November 2012. It is a rectangular flag divided into two equal vertical strips. the left side is blue in colour, in which is the emblem from the municipal coat of arms; the right side divided into six horizontal stripes: red and white.
Gmina Bodzechów		The municipal flag was established by resolution nr IV/6/2004 of 19 March 2004. It is a rectangular flag divided into two equal vertical stripes. The left one, red, bears the emblem from the municipality's coat of arms; the right side is divided into three horizontal strips: white, red and yellow in the ratio of 2:1:2.
City of Kunów and Gmina Kunów		The municipal flag was established on the 28 May 1996. It is a rectangular flag with proportions of 5:8, divided into three equal horizontal strips: blue, yellow and red.
Gmina Waśniów		The municipal flag is a rectangular flag, divided into four equal horizontal strips: white, green, red and blue in the ratio of 3:1:1:1.

=== Pińczów County ===
Municipality	Flag	Description
Gmina Kije		The municipal flag, designed by Dr Lech Stępkowski, was established by resolution nr III/109/04 of 2 May 2004. It is a rectangular flag with proportions of 5:8 green in colour, in the central part of which the emblem from the municipal coat of arms is displayed.
City of Pińczów and Gmina Pińczów		The municipal flag is a rectangular flag, blue in colour, in the central part of which the emblem from the municipal coat of arms is displayed.

=== Sandomierz County ===
Municipality	Flag	Description
Gmina Dwikozy		The municipal flag is a rectangular flag, divided into three equal horizontal strips: two yellow and one red. On the left side of the flag is a white triangle.
City of Koprzywnica and Gmina Koprzywnica		The municipal flag was established by resolution nr XXVII/134/01 of 10 April 2001. It is a rectangular flag with proportions of 5:8, divided into three horizontal strips: white, yellow and blue in the ratio of 2:1:2. In the centre of the flag the municipal coat of arms is displayed.
Gmina Łoniów		The municipal flag is a rectangular flag with proportions of 5:8, red in colour, in the centre of which the emblem from the municipal coat of arms is displayed.
City of Sandomierz		The city flag is a rectangular flag with proportions of 5:8, red in colour, in the centre of which the emblem from the municipal coat of arms is displayed. The flag was established in 2016.
Gmina Samborzec		The municipal flag, designed by Dr Jerzy Micht, was established by resolution nr XLIII/281/2018 of 19 July 2018. It is a rectangular flag with proportions of 5:8, red in colour, on the left side of the flag the emblem from the municipal coat of arms is displayed.
Gmina Wilczyce		The municipal flag was established by resolution nr XXVI/143/2005 of 30 August 2005. It is a rectangular flag, blue in colour, in the centre of which the emblem from the municipal coat of arms is displayed.

=== Skarżysko County ===
Municipality	Flag	Description
Gmina Skarżysko Kościelne		The municipal flag was established on the 26 August 1999. It is a rectangular flag, divided into two equal stripes: white and red. On the left side there is a yellow triangle with a red cross.

=== Starachowice County ===
Municipality	Flag	Description
Gmina Mirzec		The municipal flag is a rectangular flag, divided into four vertical strips: two yellow, one black and one blue in the ratio of 2:1:1:2.
City of Starachowice		The city flag was established by resolution nr XII/2/04 of 29 November 2004. It is a rectangular flag with proportions of 5:8, sky blue in colour, in the centre of which is the emblem from the town's coat of arms.

=== Staszów County ===
Municipality	Flag	Description
City of Połaniec and Gmina Połaniec		The municipal flag was established by resolution nr XLI/333/98 of 28 May 1998. It is a rectangular flag divided into two horizontal strips: red and blue. In the top left corner of the emblem from the municipal coat of arms is displayed.

=== Włoszczowa County ===
Municipality	Flag	Description
Gmina Kluczewsko		The municipal flag was established by resolution XIV/23/2012 of 29 June 2012. It is a rectangular flag with proportions of 5:8, red in colour, in the centre of which the municipal coat of arms is displayed.
Gmina Krasocin		The municipal flag, designed by Dr Jerzy Micht, was established by resolution nr XXIV/185/12 of 28 December 2012. It is a rectangular flag with proportions of 5:8, divided into two equal horizontal strips : two and red. On both strips the emblems from the municipal coat of arms is displayed
Gmina Moskorzew		The municipal flag was established by resolution nr XXXIV/138/10 of 20 August 2010. It is a rectangular flag, divided into three horizontal strips: two yellow and yellow. In the central part of which the municipal coat of arms is displayed.
Gmina Radków		The municipal flag, designed by professor Andrzej Desperak, it was established on the 30 December 2008. It is a rectangular flag, divided into three triangles: two white and one red. On the left side of the flag, there is an emblem from the municipality's coat of arms.
Gmina Secemin		The municipal flag was established by resolution nr XL/172/02 of 5 June 2002. It is a rectangular flag with proportions of 5:8, divided into three equal horizontal strips: blue and red. On the left side, there is an emblem from the municipality's coat of arms.

== See also ==
- List of county flags in the Świętokrzyskie Voivodeship
