= Stanisław A. Sroka =

Polish historian (born 1966)

- Born: 8 November 1966 (age 59); Międzybrodzie Bialskie
- Occupation: Historian

Academic background
- Education: Jagiellonian University
- Doctoral advisor: Jerzy Wyrozumski

Stanisław A. Sroka (born 8 November 1966) is a medievalist.

== Biography ==
In 1986 he graduated from the Mechanical and Electrical Technical School in Żywiec. In 1991 he graduated in history from Jagiellonian University. He obtained doctorate in 1995, upon dissertation Kariery Piastów Śląskich na Węgrzech w XIV wieku, supervised by Jerzy Wyrozumski. He obtained habilitation in 2001. His research interests include medieval history of Central Europe, especially Hungary, and the presence of Polish students at Italian universities in the Middle Ages. At the Jagiellonian University, he became a dean of the Historical Faculty.

== Works ==
- Rodzina Kurowskich w XIV–XV wieku: ze studiów nad dziejami możnowładztwa małopolskiego w średniowieczu. Kraków. 1990.
- Z dziejów stosunków polsko-węgierskich w późnym średniowieczu: szkice. Kraków. 1995.
- Książę Władysław Opolczyk na Węgrzech: studium z dziejów stosunków polsko-węgierskich w XIV wieku. Kraków. 1996.
- Elżbieta Łokietkówna. Bydgoszcz. 1999. Second edition: 2000.
- Historia Węgier do 1526 roku w zarysie. Bydgoszcz. 2000.
- Polacy na Węgrzech za panowania Zygmunta Luksemburskiego. Kraków. 2001.
- Królowa Jadwiga. Kraków. 2002.
- Szkice bardiowskie. Kraków. 2003.
- Janosik. Prawdziwa historia karpackiego zbójnika. Kraków. 2004.
- Jadwiga Zapolya. Piastówna śląska na Węgrzech w dobie panowania Jagiellonów. Kraków. 2005.
- Początki państw. Węgry. ISBN 978-83-79-76335-1.
- Średniowieczny Bardiów i jego kontakty z Małopolską. Kraków. 2010.
- Ludwik Węgierski. Warszawa. 2025.

== Accolades ==
- Ludovika Prize (2023)
