= Lidia Korczak =

Polish historian

- Occupation: Historian

Academic background
- Doctoral advisor: Jerzy Wyrozumski

Lidia Korczak is a medievalist, lecturer at the Jagiellonian University.

== Biography ==
She graduated in history from the Jagiellonian University. In 1995 she obtained doctorate upon dissertation Kształtowanie się litewskiej rady wielkoksiążęcej w Wielkim Księstwie Litewskim w XV wieku supervised by Jerzy Wyrozumski. In 2009 she obtained habilitation. She supervised one doctoral dissertation. Her research interests include the issues of power and the state system of the late Middle Ages, including the social and political foundations of the Polish–Lithuanian union, the internal situation and the power structure of the Grand Duchy of Lithuania, and the beginnings of Lithuanian parliamentarism.

== Works ==
- Litewska rada wielkoksiążęca w XV wieku. Kraków: Polska Akademia Umiejętności. 1998.
- Litwa – przechowana tożsamość. Kraków: Międzynarodowe Centrum Kultury. 1998.
- Monarcha i poddani. System władzy w Wielkim Księstwie Litewskim w okresie wczesnojagiellońskim. Kraków: Towarzystwo Wydawnicze "Historia Iagellonica". 2008.
- Jan Długosz (1415–1480): życie i dzieła. Kraków: Towarzystwo Wydawnicze "Historia Iagellonica". 2016. Co-authored with Marek Daniel Kowalski and Piotr Węcowski.

=== Editions ===
- 1413 m. Horodlės aktai (dokumentai ir tyrinėjimai). Akty horodelskie z 1413 roku (dokumenty i studia). Kraków–Vilnius: Polska Akademia Umiejętności–Lietuvos Istorijos Institutas. 2013.
- Akty unii wieleńskiej i mielnickiej (1499–1501): dokumenty i studia. Kraków–Vilnius: Polska Akademia Umiejętności–Lietuvos Istorijos Institutas. 2022.
