= Kraków Land =

The coat of arms of the Kraków Land.

The Kraków Land (Note: English pronunciation: /ˈkrækaʊ, ˈkrækoʊ/ KRAK-ow, KRAK-oh, US also /ˈkreɪkaʊ, ˈkrɑːkaʊ/ KRAY-kow, KRAH-kow, UK also /ˈkrækɒf/ KRAK-of; Polish pronunciation: [ˈkrakuf]) (Polish: ziemia krakowska; Latin: Terra Cracoviensis), also spelled as Cracow Land, (Note: Polish: ziemia krakowska; Latin: Terra Cracoviensis) was a land (administrative subdivision) of Poland in the Middle Ages. It was located in the Lesser Poland, and centered around its capital, Kraków. Since 1138, it was a main land of the Seniorate Province, that in 1227, was replaced by the Duchy of Kraków. Around 1314, the area of land was incorporated into Kraków Voivodeship, that was established within the same borders.

== Symbols ==
The coat of arms of the Kraków Land depicted the white (silver) eagle with its head turned right, with a yellow (golden) crown.
