= Marek Daniel Kowalski =

Polish medievalist (born 1966)

- Born: 1966 (age 59–60)
- Citizenship: Polish
- Occupation: medievalist

Academic background
- Education: Jagiellonian University
- Doctoral advisor: Jerzy Wyrozumski

Marek Daniel Kowalski (born 1966) is a medievalist.

== Biography ==
In 1990 he graduated with master's degree in civil engineering from the Kraków University of Technology. In 1994 he graduated with master's degree in history from the Jagiellonian University. In 1999 he obtained doctorate under the supervision of Jerzy Wyrozumski. In 2011 he obtained habilitation.

In 1999 he started work at the Jagiellonian University. From December 2009 until June 2018 he worked also at the Tadeusz Manteuffel Institute of History of the Polish Academy of Sciences. He supervised one doctoral dissertation.

His research interests include papal treasury and diplomacy, Poland's relations with the Holy See, history of the Polish Church in the late Middle Ages, source studies and editing of historical sources and social and economic history of Poland in the late Middle Ages.

== Works ==
=== Monographs ===
- Prałaci i kanonicy krakowskiej kapituły katedralnej od pontyfikatu biskupa Nankera do śmierci biskupa Zawiszy z Kurozwęk (1320–1382). Kraków: Towarzystwo Miłośników Historii i Zabytków Krakowa. 1996.
- Uposażenie krakowskiej kapituły katedralnej w średniowieczu. Kraków: Towarzystwo Naukowe "Societas Vistulana". 2000.
- Proventus camerae apostolicae debiti: opłaty duchowieństwa polskiego na rzecz papiestwa w latach 1417–1484. Kraków: Towarzystwo Wydawnicze "Historia Iagellonica". 2010.
- Jan Długosz (1415–1480): życie i dzieła. Kraków: Towarzystwo Wydawnicze "Historia Iagellonica". 2016. Co-authored with Lidia Korczak and Piotr Węcowski.
- W łączności ze Stolicą Piotrową. Dokumenty papieskie z Archiwum Państwowego we Wrocławiu. Wrocław. 2020. Co-authored with Stanisław Jujeczko.

=== Source editions ===
- Kronika Jana z Czarnkowa. Józef Żerbiłło-Łabuński (translated by), Marek Daniel Kowalski (text and footnotes editing). Kraków: Towarzystwo Autorów i Wydawców Prac Naukowych "Universitas". 1996. Following editions published in 2001, 2006 and 2009.
- Annatae e Regno Poloniae saeculi XV (1421–1503). Monumenta Poloniae Vaticana. Vol. X. Acta Camerae Apostolicae, vol. IV. Marek Daniel Kowalski (editor, introduction and index provided). Kraków: Polska Akademia Umiejętności. 2002.
