= Wojciech Drelicharz =

Polish historian (born 1965)

- Born: 1965 (age 60–61)
- Occupation: Historian

Academic background
- Education: Jagiellonian University
- Doctoral advisor: Jerzy Wyrozumski

Wojciech Drelicharz (born 1965) is a historian, professor at the Jagiellonian University.

== Biography ==
He studied history with elements of classical philology, philosophy and art history at the Jagiellonian University from 1984 to 1989. He obtained doctorate in 2001 upon dissertation Annalistyka małopolska XIII – XV w. Kierunki rozwoju i treści ideowe supervised by Jerzy Wyrozumski. He held scholarship of the government of France (Paris; April–June 1994), Foundation for Polish Science (1995–1996) and Lanckoroński Foundation (Rome; May–June 2004 and May 2007). He obtained habilitation in 2013. He supervised one doctoral dissertation. He co-authored flag and coat of arms of the Lesser Poland Voivodeship.

== Works ==
- Richtungen in der Entwicklung der kleinpolnischen Annalistik im 13.-15. Jh. Wydawnictwo Uniwersytetu Mikołaja Kopernika. 1999.
- Annalistyka małopolska XIII – XV wieku. Kierunki rozwoju wielkich roczników kompilowanych. 2003.
- Dawne i nowe herby Małopolski. Kraków. 2004. Co-authored with Zenon Piech.
- Idea zjednoczenia Królestwa w średniowiecznym dziejopisarstwie polskim. Towarzystwo Naukowe Societas Vistulana. 2012.
- Unifying the Kingdom of Poland in mediaeval historiographic thought. Towarzystwo Naukowe Societas Vistulana. 2019. Translated by Anna Skucińska.

=== Editions ===
- Inskrypcje polskich grobów na cmentarzach Podola. Vol. 1. Towarzystwo Naukowe Societas Vistulana. 2004. ISBN 8388385445.
- Pomniki epigrafiki i heraldyki dawnej Rzeczypospolitej na Ukrainie. Vol. 1. Towarzystwo Naukowe Societas Vistulana. 2005. ISBN 83-88385-67-4.
- Pomniki epigrafiki i heraldyki dawnej Rzeczypospolitej na Ukrainie. Vol. 2. Towarzystwo Naukowe Societas Vistulana. 2005. ISBN 83-88385-82-8.
- Pomniki epigrafiki i heraldyki dawnej Rzeczypospolitej na Ukrainie. Vol. 3. Towarzystwo Naukowe Societas Vistulana. 2008. ISBN 978-83-61033-28-8.
- Pomniki epigrafiki i heraldyki dawnej Rzeczypospolitej na Ukrainie. Vol. 4. Towarzystwo Naukowe Societas Vistulana. 2009. ISBN 978-83-61033-29-5.
- Pomniki epigrafiki i heraldyki dawnej Rzeczypospolitej na Ukrainie. Vol. 5. Towarzystwo Naukowe Societas Vistulana. 2018. ISBN 978-83-65548-36-8.

== Accolades ==
- Knight's Cross of the Order of Polonia Restituta (2020)
