= Andrzej Marzec =

Polish historian (born 1971)

- Born: 26 November 1971
- Citizenship: Polish
- Occupation: historian

Academic background
- Education: Jagiellonian University
- Doctoral advisor: Jerzy Wyrozumski

Andrzej Kornel Marzec (born 26 November 1971) is a historian-medievalist, academic lecturer at the Jagiellonian University.

== Biography ==
He graduated from the Jagiellonian University in history in 1995. In 2003 he obtained doctorate, under the supervision of Jerzy Wyrozumski. In 2018 he obtained habilitation.

== Books ==
- Urzędnicy małopolscy w otoczeniu Władysława Łokietka i Kazimierza Wielkiego (1305–1370). Kraków: Wydawnictwo Towarzystwa Naukowego „Societas Vistulana”. 2006.
- Pod rządami nieobecnego monarchy. Królestwo Polskie w latach 1370–1382. Kraków: Wydawnictwo „Societas Vistulana”. 2017.

=== Edition ===
- Król w Polsce XIV i XV wieku. Kraków: Wydawnictwo Towarzystwa Naukowego „Societas Vistulana”. 2006. Co-editor: M. Wilamowski.
- "Ziemia przemyska dawnego województwa ruskiego". Pomniki epigrafiki i heraldyki dawnej Rzeczypospolitej na Ukrainie. Vol. 3. Wojciech Drelicharz (ed.). Kraków: Wydawnictwo Towarzystwa Naukowego „Societas Vistulana”. 2008.
- Cztery studia o heraldyce, epigrafice i kostiumologii. Kraków: Wydawnictwo Towarzystwa Naukowego „Societas Vistulana”. 2010.
- Signa studia i szkice z nauk pomocniczych historii. Prace dedykowane Profesorowi Zenonowi Piechowi w sześcdziesiątą rocznicę urodzin. Kraków. 2014. Co-edited with Marcin Starzyński.
