= Symbols of Sandomierz County =

The coat of arms of the Sandomierz County.

The flag of the Sandomierz County.

The coat of arms of Sandomierz County is divided vertically into two fields, with the left field consisting of six horizontal stripes, alternating between red and white (silver) colours, and the right field featuring nine yellow (golden) six-armed stars, placed in three horizontal rows. The flag of the county divided into three vertical stripes, of blue, yellow, and blue colour, with the middle stripe being three times, and the coat of arms placed in the centre. The design was based on the historical coat of arms of the Sandomierz Voivodeship, used from 14th to 18th centuries.

== Design ==
The coat of arms of the Sandomierz County, consists of the Iberian style escutcheon (shield), with square top and rounded base, that is divided vertically into two fields. The left field consists of six horizontal stripes, alternating between red and white (silver) colours. The right field features nine yellow (golden) six-armed stars, placed in three horizontal rows, each containing three stars. The nine stars are meant to symbolize the nine gminas (municipalities) of the county. The design was based on the historical coat of arms of the Sandomierz Voivodeship, used from 14th to 18th centuries.

The flag of the county is a rectangle divided into three vertical stripes, with the middle stripe being three times longer than the other. The middle stripe is yellow, while the other stripes, dark blue. In the centre of the flag is placed the coat of arms of the county. The aspect ratio of the flag's height to its width, that forms flag's proportions, equals 5:8.

== See also ==
- coat of arms of the Sandomierz Voivodeship
