= Zenon Piech =

Polish historian (born 1954)

- Born: 1954 (age 71–72); Kraków
- Occupation: Historian

Zenon Piech (born 1954) is a historian, professor at the Jagiellonian University.

== Biography ==
In 1973, he graduated in history from the Jagiellonian University. He obtained his doctorate in 1988. He obtained habilitation in 2004. He supervised five doctoral dissertations. He published, among others, on Władysław Semkowicz.

He was chairman of the Commission for Auxiliary Sciences of History and Editorial Studies of the Polish Academy of Sciences.

A book Signa studia i szkice z nauk pomocniczych historii. Prace dedykowane Profesorowi Zenonowi Piechowi w sześcdziesiątą rocznicę urodzin (Kraków 2014), edited by Andrzej Marzec and Marcin Starzyński, was dedicated to Zenon Piech on his 60th birthday.

== Works ==
- Ikonograﬁa pieczęci Piastów. Kraków. 1993.
- Monety, pieczęcie i herby w systemie symboli władzy Jagiellonów. Warszawa. 2003.
- Dawne i nowe herby Małopolski. Kraków. 2004. Co-authored with Wojciech Drelicharz.

== Accolades ==
- Knight's Cross of the Order of Polonia Restituta (2023)
