= Krzysztof Stopka =

Polish historian (born 1958)

- Born: 1958 (age 67–68); Panki
- Occupation: Historian

Academic background
- Education: Jagiellonian University
- Doctoral advisor: Jerzy Wyrozumski

Krzysztof Jan Stopka (born 1958) is a historian and armenologist, professor at the Jagiellonian University, since 2011 director of the Jagiellonian University Museum.

== Biography ==
In 1982 he graduated in history from Jagiellonian University. In 1992 he obtained doctorate upon dissertation Szkoły katedralne metropolii gnieźnieńskiej w średniowieczu na tle europejskim supervised by Jerzy Wyrozumski. In 2003 he obtained habilitation. He supervised six doctoral dissertations.

From 2004 to 2011 he was the director of the Jagiellonian University Archive. From 2011 he is the director of the Jagiellonian University Museum. His research interests include the history of education, culture and the Church in the Middle Ages and modern times, as well as the history of the Armenians. He was co-founder and first editor-in-chief of the journal Lehahayer.

== Works ==
- Ormiańska Warszawa. Fundacja Kultury i Dziedzictwa Ormian Polskich. 2012. Co-authored with Andrzej A. Zięba, A. Artwich and M. Agopsowicz.
- Ormianie polscy: kultura i dziedzictwo: studia i materiały źródłowe zebrane dla uczczenia jubileuszu dziesięciolecia Fundacji Kultury i Dziedzictwa Ormian Polskich. Księgarnia Akademicka. 2016. Co-authored with Andrzej A. Zięba.
- Armenia Christiana: Armenian religious identity and the Churches of Constantinople and Rome (4th–15th century). Uniwersytet Jagielloński w Krakowie. 2017. Translated by Teresa Bałuk-Ulewiczowa.
- Ormiańska Polska. Hayoc' Lehistanë. Armenian Poland. Fundacja Kultury i Dziedzictwa Ormian Polskich. 2018. Co-authored with Andrzej A. Zięba.
- Ormianie katolicy w Armenii i Gruzji: historia, pamięć, tożsamość. Księgarnia Akademicka. 2019. Co-authored with J. Osiecki, K. Siekierski.

=== Editions ===
- Corpus studiosorum Universitatis Iagellonicae 1850/51–1917/18 (E–Q, 2006–2011)th century. 2000.
- Uniwersytet Jagielloński w Krakowie 1364–2014. 2014.
- Amico, socio et viro docto: księga ku czci profesora Andrzeja Kazimierza Banacha. 2015. Co-edited with Tomasz Pudłocki.
- Corpus studiosorum Universitatis Iagellonicae 1850/51-1917/18. 2015. Co-edited with U. Perkowska.
- Ormianie polscy w opisach i obrazach. 2017. Co-edited with Andrzej A. Zięba.

=== Source editions ===
- Jasachy gminy Ormian lwowskich za lata 1598–1638 w języku ormiańsko-kipczackim. Księgarnia Akademicka. 2020.
- Metryka katedry ormiańskiej we Lwowie za lata 1635–1732. 2020. With M. Majewski.

== Accolades ==
- Klio Award for the book Ormiańska Warszawa (2013)
- Silver Gloria Artis Medal for Merit to Culture (2017)
- Knight's Cross of the Order of Polonia Restituta (2022)
