= Nowe Ateny =

First Polish-language encyclopedia

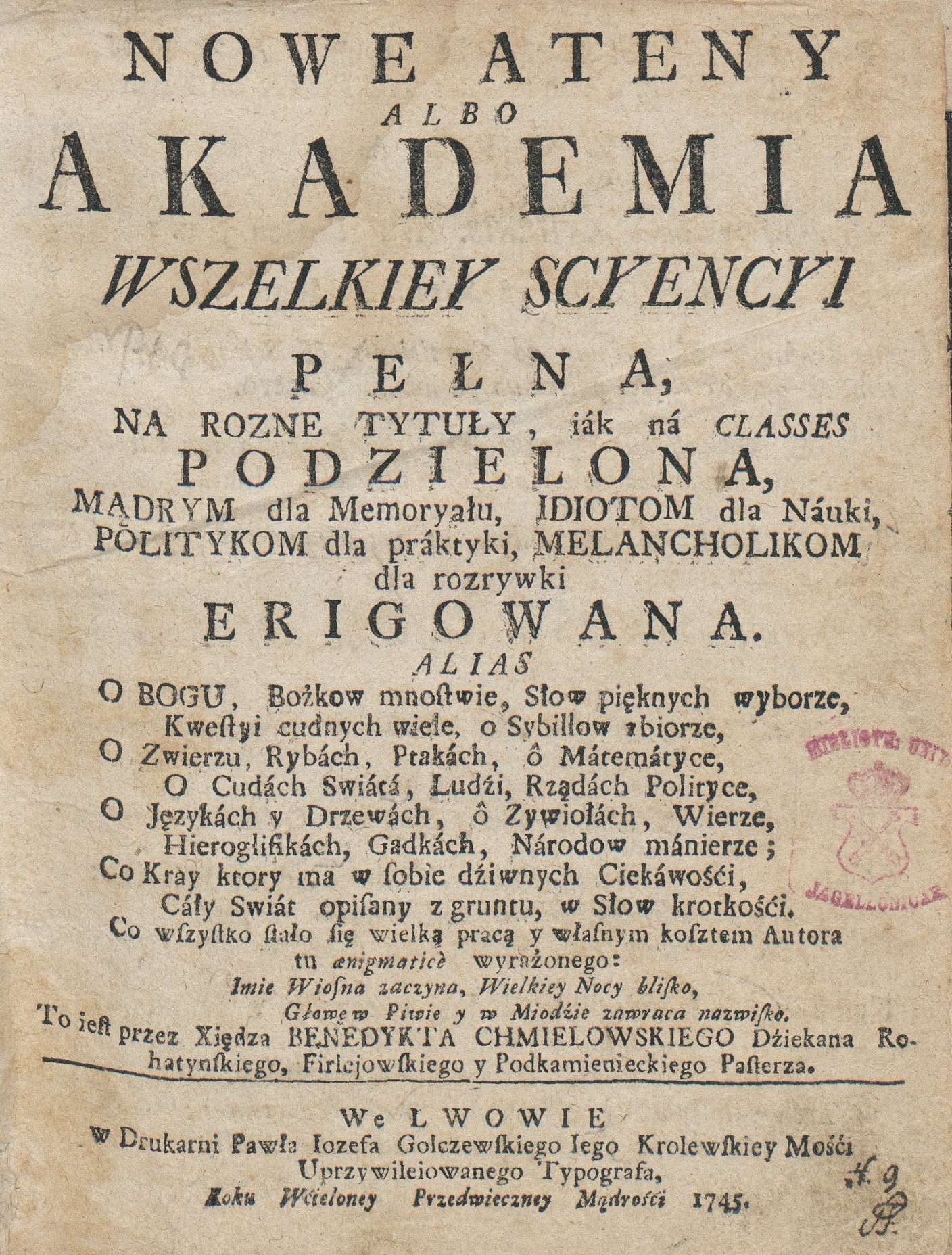
- Nowe Ateny – title page
- Author: Benedykt Chmielowski
- Language: Polish
- Publication date: 1745–1746
- Publication place: Poland–Lithuania
- Media type: Encyclopedia

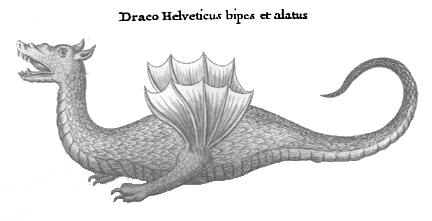
Illustration of a dragon from Nowe Ateny. Commentary from Nowe Ateny: "Defeating the dragon is hard, but you have to try."

Nowe Ateny (New Athens) is the abbreviated title of the first Polish-language encyclopedia, authored by the 18th-century Polish priest Benedykt Joachim Chmielowski. The first edition was published in 1745–1746 in Lwów (Lviv); the second edition was updated and expanded in 1754–1764.

The first part of the full title was: New Athens or the Academy full of all science, divided into subjects and classes, for the wise ones to record, for the idiots to learn, for the politicians to practice, for the melancholics to entertain issued... (Note: Polish: Nowe Ateny albo Akademia wszelkiej sciencyi pełna, na różne tytuły jak na classes podzielona, mądrym dla memoryału, idiotom dla nauki, politykom dla praktyki, melancholikom dla rozrywki erigowana...)

The book uses the Polish language as the main text, and primarily Latin for the in-line references. Chmielowski also included anecdotes in the text, and tales about strange and exotic topics.

== Organization and content ==
The first edition of the encyclopedia contains 938 pages, organized by subject rather than alphabetically. Chmielowski compiled data from a few hundred references, dating from antiquity to his contemporary.

Almost every sentence in the book is in-line referenced, frequently in Latin, a lingua franca in Poland among the educated classes as in most of 18th century Central and Western Europe. Chmielowski added personal annotations as well; for example, "Dragons existed for sure, I myself held, visiting Radziwills' castle, a rib of a dragon bigger than a regular sabre". Judging from the inclusion of numerous stories, anecdotes, and descriptions of strange phenomena and exotic countries (like China and Japan), the encyclopedia was directed towards a rather popular audience and aimed to arouse readers' curiosity and desire for learning.

== Legacy ==
The encyclopedia was a controversial topic during the Enlightenment period. Some critics argued that it was a waste of time and money, and that it would only serve to spread ignorance and superstition. Others argued that it was a dangerous tool that could be used to challenge authority and traditional beliefs.

Nowe Ateny is the source of a few memorable and amusing "definitions", often quoted in Poland to this day:

- Horse: Everyone can see what a horse is. (pol. Koń jaki jest, każdy widzi)
- Goats, a stinking kind of animal. (pol. Kozy, śmierdzący rodzaj zwierząt)

The humor was probably unintentional by the author. Rather, he did not see the benefit of defining the most common animals of the time and place for his intended audience. Furthermore, the entry for "Horse" does contain more detailed exposition beyond the initial "definition".

In modern Polish, the above definition of the horse is sometimes used as a colorful equivalent of the statement "the concept is more obvious than it appears to be from its more technical definition".

In the last few decades, opinions about Nowe Ateny have changed for the positive. The quotations above are fragments taken from a broader context. For example, Chmielowski wrote more than 15 pages about the horses in his monumental, 3000-page encyclopedia (four volumes).

== Bibliography ==
- Wojciech Paszyński, Ksiądz Benedykt Chmielowski – życie i dzieło Diogenesa firlejowskiego, "Nasza Przeszłość" 2015/2, t. 124, s. 105–136.
- Wojciech Paszyński, Czarna legenda "Nowych Aten" Benedykta Chmielowskiego i próby jej przezwyciężenia, "Zeszyty Naukowe Uniwersytetu Jagiellońskiego. Prace Historyczne" 2014/1(141), s. 37–59.
