= Tomasz Pudłocki =

Polish historian (born 1981)

- Born: 13 February 1981; Przemyśl
- Citizenship: Polish
- Education: Jagiellonian University
- Occupation: historian

Tomasz Pudłocki (born 13 February 1981) is a historian specializing in the history of culture, science and education, professor at the Jagiellonian University, between 2011 and 2013 president of the Society of Friends of Science in Przemyśl, between 2021 and 2023 director of the Archive of Science of the Polish Academy of Sciences and the Polish Academy of Arts and Sciences in Kraków, popularizer of history.

== Biography ==
He graduated in history from the Jagiellonian University, with distinction in 2004. His master's thesis Życie codzienne w I Państwowym Gimnazjum i Liceum im. J. Słowackiego w Przemyślu w latach 1918–1939 was supervised by Andrzej Kazimierz Banach. In 2008, also at the Jagiellonian University, he obtained a doctoral degree in humanities in the field of history based on his thesis Inteligencja w Przemyślu od II połowy XIX w. do 1939 roku written under the suprvision of Andrzej Kazimierz Banach.

In 2008 he was employed at the Institute of History of the Jagiellonian University as an assistant. In 2010, he was hired as an assistant professor there. In 2010–2011, he served as acting director of part-time studies at the Jagiellonian University's Institute of History. In the years 2013–2016 he received a scholarship from the Minister of Science and Higher Education for young researchers.

In 2016, he obtained his habilitation in the humanities from the Faculty of History of the Jagiellonian University, specializing in the history of culture, science, and education. From 2016 to 2017, he was the Erasmus program coordinator at the Institute of History of the Jagiellonian University. In 2017, he became the head of the Studies in Central and Eastern Europe: cultures, histories, and societies program at the Faculty of History of the Jagiellonian University.

In 2012–2013 he was a scholarship holder of the Kościuszko Foundation in New York and a visiting professor at Columbia University. In 2015–2016 he was a scholarship holder of the Polish-American Fulbright Commission and a visiting professor at Daemen College in Amherst, where he organized two scientific conferences. In 2017–2018 he was again a Kosciuszko Foundation Scholar in New York and a visiting professor at the Pratt Institute in Brooklyn, New York.

In 2011, he became the editor-in-chief of Rocznik Przemyski. He co-edited Przemyski Słownik Biograficzny. He became a member of the editorial boards of: Krakowskie Pismo Kresowe (since 2008), З історії західноукраїнських земель (since 2015) and Pilar. Časopis za društvene i humanističke studije (since 2016). He published more than forty reviews in the Kwartalnik Historyczny. He was elected a member of Łódzkie Towarzystwo Naukowe.

== Books ==
- Blask szarości... Życie codzienne w I Państwowym Gimnazjum im. Juliusza Słowackiego w Przemyślu w latach 1918–1939. Przemyśl. 2004.
- Iskra światła czy kopcąca pochodnia? Inteligencja w Przemyślu w latach 1867–1939. Kraków. 2009.
- Będziemy działać... Wincenta Tarnawska w służbie niepodległości Polski. Kraków. 2013.
- Ambasadorzy idei. Wkład intelektualistów w promowanie pozytywnego wizerunku Polski w Wielkiej Brytanii w latach 1918–1939. Kraków. 2015.
- Szekspir i Polska. Życie Władysława Tarnawskiego (1885–1951). Rzeszów–Warszawa. 2023.

=== Editor ===
- Historia zwyczajnych kobiet i zwyczajnych mężczyzn. Dzieje społeczne w perspektywie gender. Przemyśl. 2007. Co-editor.
- Przez błękit i gwiazdy jestem z Wami. W 200. rocznicę urodzin Juliusza Słowackiego. Przemyśl-Rzeszów. 2009. Co-editor.
- Aktywność publiczna kobiet na ziemiach polskich. Wybrane zagadnienia. Warszawa. 2013. Co-editor.
- Przemyśl i ziemia przemyska w strefie wpływów ruskich (X – połowa XIV w.). Kraków. 2013. Co-editor.
- Prowincja galicyjska wokół I wojny światowej. Konteksty, porównania, przykłady. Przemyśl. 2014. Co-editor.
- Amico, socio et viro docto. Księga ku czci profesora Andrzeja Kazimierza Banacha. Kraków. 2015. Co-editor with Krzysztof Stopka.
- Puszcza Sandomierska od kuchni. Między tradycją a współczesnością. Kolbuszowa. 2017. Co-editor.
- Intellectuals and World War I. A Central European Perspective. Kraków. 2018. Co-editor.
- Rus's and Poland (10th–14th Centuries). Kraków. 2019. Co-editor.
- Wielka wojna wyzwań duchowych. Kapelani wojskowi na froncie wschodnim 1914–1920. Kraków. 2020. Co-editor.
- Postwar Continuity and New Challenges in Central Europe, 1918–1923. The War That Never Ended. New York–London. 2022. Co-editor.
- Archiwum Nauki PAN i PAU z perspektywy 20 lat: rzeczywistość i wyzwania. Kraków. 2022. Co-editor.
- Renata Dutkowa 1927–2015: materiały z posiedzenia naukowego w dniu 22 kwietnia 2022 roku. Kraków. 2022. Co-editor.
