= Krzysztof Ożóg =

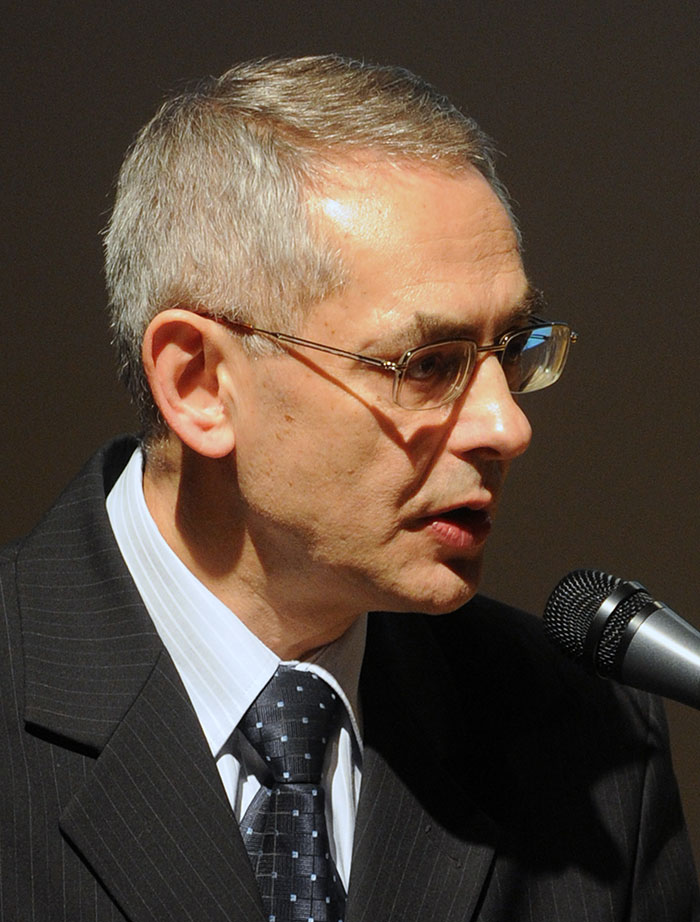
- Krzysztof Ożóg, 2013
- Born: 1956 (age 69–70)
- Citizenship: Polish
- Occupation: medievalist

Krzysztof Ożóg (born 1956) is a medievalist, professor at the Jagiellonian University.

== Biography ==
In 1979 he graduated in history from the Jagiellonian University. In 1987 he obtained doctorate from the Jagiellonian University. In 1996 he obtained habilitation, upon dissertation Intelektualiści w służbie Królestwa Polskiego w latach 1306-1382. In 2005 he obtained the title of professor. He supervised 14 doctoral dissertations.

His scientific interests include the history of medieval Poland and Europe, in particular: medieval intellectual circles and their connections with the world of power and politics, Central European universities in the late Middle Ages, historiography, Church history, medieval clergy, history of spirituality, political history of medieval Poland, regional history, editions of medieval sources.

== Works ==
- Kultura umysłowa w Krakowie w XIV wieku: środowisko duchowieństwa świeckiego. 1987.
- Intelektualiści w służbie Królestwa Polskiego w latach 1306–1382. 1995.
- Uczeni w monarchii Jadwigi Andegaweńskiej i Władysława Jagiełły 1384–1434. 2004.
- Miejsce Polski w rozwoju intelektualnym Europy w XIV-XV wieku. 2006.
- Chwała Grunwaldu. 2010. Co-authors: Leszek Sosnowski, Adam Bujak. Translations: The glory of Grunwald (into English); Der Ruhm Tannenbergs (into German; both 2010).
- Korona i Krzyż: czas Piastów i Jagiellonów. 2012.
- Wielka Księga Polskich Patriotów. Kraków: Wydawnictwo Biały Kruk. 2013. ISBN 9788375531480.
- 966. Chrzest Polski. Kraków: Wydawnictwo Biały Kruk. 2015. ISBN 978-83-7553-194-7.
- Polskość jest przywilejem. Kraków: Wydawnictwo Biały Kruk. 2016. ISBN 978-83-7553-219-7.
- Narodziny potęgi. Dziedzictwo Kazimierza Wielkiego. Kraków: Wydawnictwo Biały Kruk. 2020.

== Awards ==
- Knight's Cross of Polonia Restituta (2022)
- Pro Patria Medal (2023)
- Medal „Plus ratio quam vis” (2025)
