= Coat of arms of the Lesser Poland Voivodeship =

Polish coat of arms

- Armiger: Krzysztof Klęczar, Voivode of the Lesser Poland Voivodeship
- Adopted: 24 May 1999
- Shield: Red Iberian style escutcheon
- Compartment: White (silver) eagle with a yellow (golden) crown on his head that is turned left, a beak, legs, and a stripes on its wings
- Use: Lesser Poland Voivodeship

The coat of arms of the Lesser Poland Voivodeship, Poland features a white (silver) eagle with a yellow (golden) crown on his head that is turned left, a beak, legs, and a stripes on its wings, with the charge placed on the red background. It was designed by Wojciech Drelicharz, Zenon Piech, and Barbara Widłak, and adopted in 1999.

== Design ==
The coat of arms of the Lesser Poland Voivodeship is a red Iberian style escutcheon with square top and rounded base. It features a white (silver) eagle with a yellow (golden) crown on his head that is turned left, a beak, legs, and a stripes on its wings.

== History ==
The coat of arms of the Kraków Land, and the Kraków Voivodeship, from 14th century until 1795.

The coat of arms of the Kraków Voivodeship from 1816 to 1837, the Kraków Governorate, from 1837 to 1841, and the Kielce Governorate, from 1841 to 1844.

The design of the coat of arms had originated as the symbol of the Kraków Land, a land (administrative subdivision) of Poland in the Middle Ages. It depicted a white (silver) eagle with a yellow (golden) crown on his head that is turned right, a beak, legs, and a stripes on its wings, with the charge placed on the red background. In 14th century, after 1314, the design became the coat of arms of then-established Kraków Voivodeship, that was formed within the borders of the Kraków Land. It was used until 1795, when the voivodeship had ceased to exist following the Third Partition of Poland. It was once again used as the coat of arms of the Kraków Voivodeship of the Congress Poland, that existed from 1816 to 1837, and then as the coat of arms of the Kraków Governorate, from 1837 to 1841. In 1841, the subdivision was replaced by the Kielce Governorate, which continued to use said coat of arms until 1844, when it ceased to exist.

The design of the coat of arms of the Kraków Voivodeship proposed in 1928.

In 1928, as part of the project to design the coat of arms for the voivodeships of the Second Polish Republic, the design for the coat of arms of the Kraków Voivodeship had been created. Though planned to be officially approved, it never was, as it was decided to postpone the approval of the subdivision symbols due to the planned administrative reform, that eventually took place in 1938. Eventually, the plans for the establishment of the coat of arms had been stopped by the Invasion of Poland by Nazi Germany, on 1 September 1939, that begun the World War II, and were not picked up back after the end of the conflict. The proposed design featured a white eagle with a yellow (golden) crown on his head that is turned right, a beak, legs, and a stripes on its wings, with the charge being placed on the red background.

The currently-used coat of arms of the Lesser Poland Voivodeship had been designed by Wojciech Drelicharz and Zenon Piech, and its artwork had been made by Barbara Widłak. It had been adopted by the Lesser Poland Voivodeship Sejmik on 24 May 1999.

== See also ==
- flag of the Lesser Poland Voivodeship
