= Kraków Voivodeship (1919–1939) =

Former voivodeship of Poland

Coordinates: 50°03′41″N 19°56′18″E

Kraków Voivodeship Województwo krakowskie
- Voivodeship of Poland
- 1920–1939
- Coat of arms

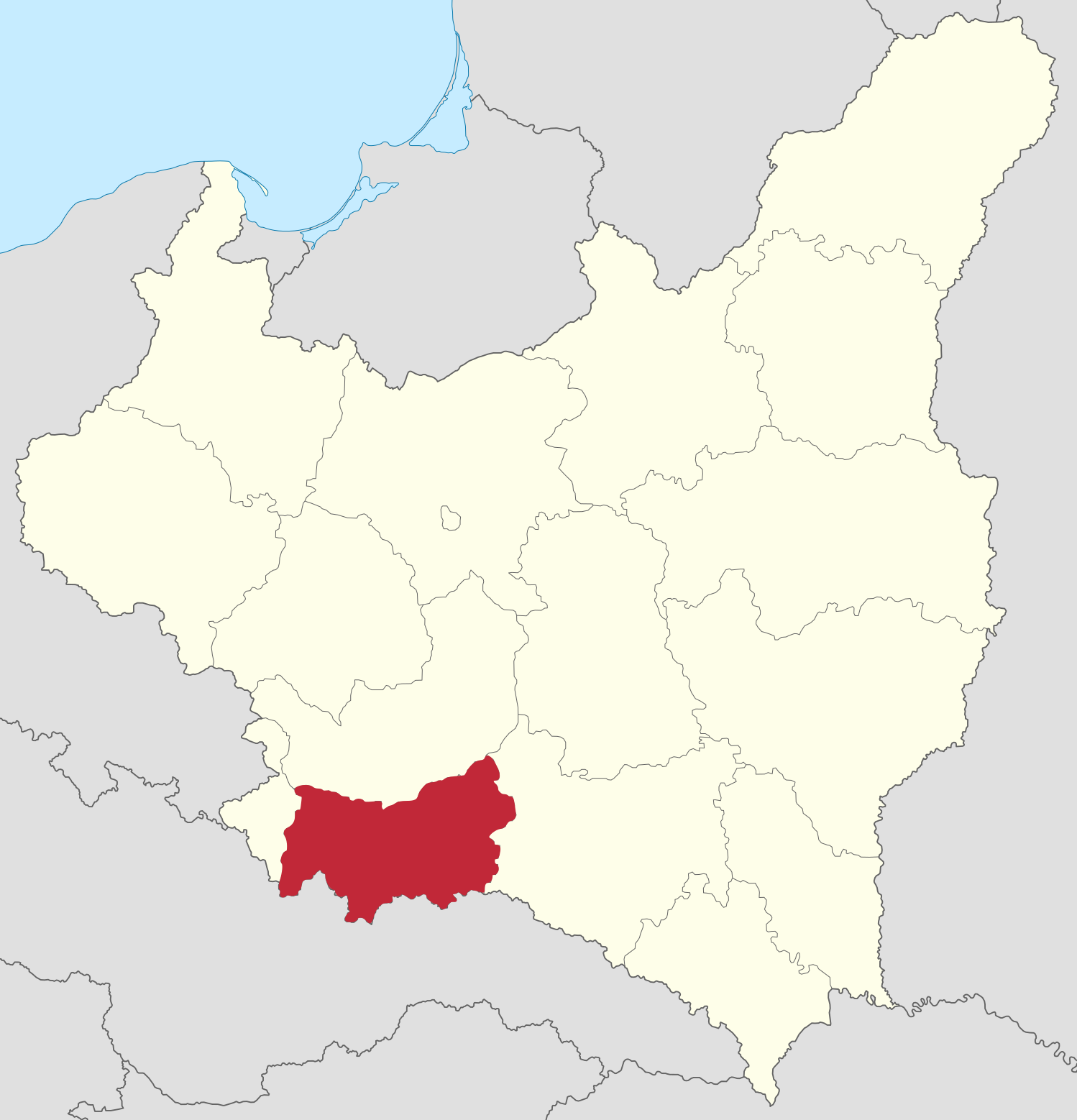
- Location of the Kraków Voivodeship (red) within the Second Polish Republic, 1938.
- Capital: Kraków
- Area
  - 1921: 17,448 km^{2} (6,737 sq mi)
  - 1939: 17,560 km^{2} (6,780 sq mi)
- Population
  - 1921: 1,992,810
  - 1931: 2,300,100
- Government
  - Type: Voivodeship
- Voivodes
  - 1921–1923: Kazimierz Junosza-Gałecki
  - 1937–1939: Józef Tymiński
- Historical era: Interwar period
  - Established: 23 December 1920
  - Annexed by Germany: September 1939
- Political subdivisions: 18 powiats
Preceded by	Succeeded by
Kingdom of Galicia and Lodomeria	Province of Upper Silesia; Kraków District

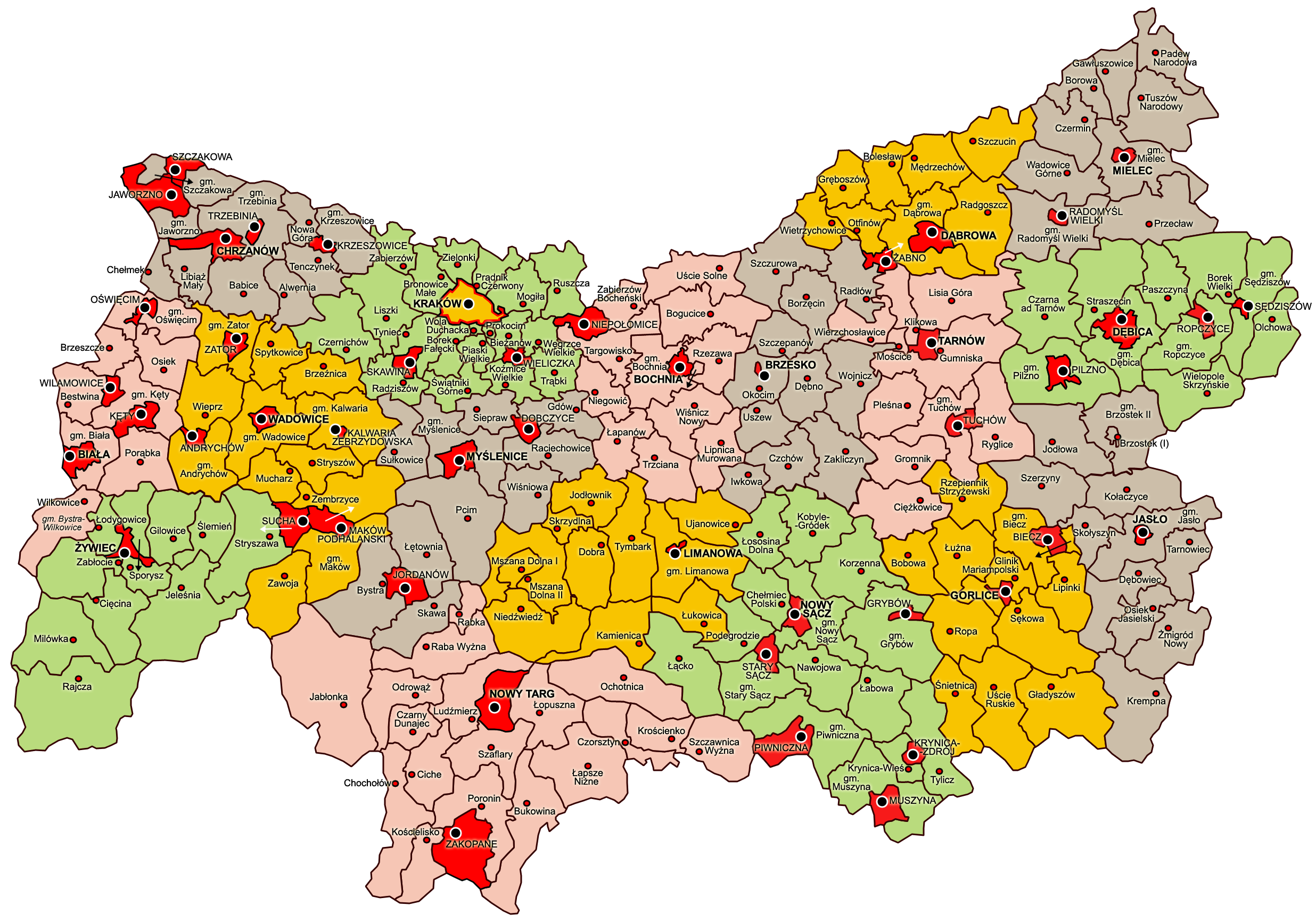
Administrative division, 1938

Kraków Voivodeship (Polish: województwo krakowskie) was a unit of administrative division and local government in Poland in years 1919–1939. It occupied a large area of the southern part of the country, including such cities as Kraków, Jaworzno and Tarnów. Its capital city was Kraków.

== Location and area ==
In early 1939, Voivodeship's area was 17,560 square kilometers. It was located in southern Poland, bordering Autonomous Silesian Voivodeship to the west, Kielce Voivodeship to the north, Lublin Voivodeship, Lwów Voivodeship to the east and Slovakia to the south. Landscape was hilly in the northern part and mountainous in south, with the Tatra Mountains located in the very south of the area. Forests covered 20.9%, with the national average 22.2% (as for January 1, 1937).

== Industry ==
Kraków Voivodeship was very divided in industrial terms. Its western part, with such cities as Jaworzno, Chrzanów or Trzebinia, was to a large degree industrialized and urbanized, with some coalmines. Also Kraków and Tarnów were big industrial centers. The eastern part, on the other hand, was backward, with little industry and underdeveloped agriculture. In mid-1930s Polish government started a huge public works program, called Centralny Okręg Przemysłowy (COP), which was a great boost to overpopulated and poor central and eastern counties.

The province was unofficially divided into three regions: southern (tourist), western (industrial), and eastern, with its developing industry of the COP. In 1938, the voivodeship was visited by 217,000 tourists. In early 1939, local government began a program of creation of three model tourist villages: Sol in Zywiec County, Tymbark in Limanowa County, and Szymbark in Gorlice County. Furthermore, regulation of the Vistula began in 1938, with levees built along its shores. The road connecting Kraków with Zakopane was to be completed by the end of 1939, after which funds were to be assigned to modernization of the main road from Kraków to Lwow. Due to the outbreak of World War II, none of the projects were finished.

== Cities and administrative divisions ==
In 1938, the Kraków Voivodeship consisted of 18 powiats (counties). These were as follows:

- Biala Krakowska county (area 635 km^{2}, population 139,100),
- Bochnia county (area 877 km^{2}, population 113,800),
- Brzesko county (area 849 km^{2}, population 102,200),
- Chrzanów county (area 722 km^{2}, population 138,100),
- Dąbrowa Tarnowska county (area 650 km^{2}, population 66,700),
- Dębica county (area 1 141 km^{2}, population 110,900),
- Gorlice county (area 1 082 km^{2}, population 104,800),
- Jasło county (area 1 055 km^{2}, population 116,100),
- city of Kraków county (powiat krakowski grodzki), (area 48 km^{2}, population 219,300),
- Kraków county (area 884 km^{2}, population 187,500),
- Limanowa county (area 944 km^{2}, population 87,300),
- Mielec county (area 901 km^{2}, population 77,500),
- Myślenice county (area 988 km^{2}, population 102,700),
- Nowy Sącz county (area 1 572 km^{2}, population 183,900),
- Nowy Targ county (area 2 069 km^{2}, population 131,800),
- Tarnów county (area 881 km^{2}, population 142,400),
- Wadowice county (area 1 109 km^{2}, population 145,100),
- Żywiec county (area 1 337 km^{2}, population 130,900).

According to the 1931 census, biggest cities within the Voivodeship's boundaries were:

- Kraków (pop. 219,300),
- Tarnów (pop. 44,900),
- Nowy Sącz (pop. 30,300),
- Biala Krakowska (pop. 22,700),
- Jaworzno (pop. 19,100),
- Chrzanów (pop. 17,900),
- Zakopane (pop. 16,300),
- Bochnia (pop. 12,100),
- Oświęcim (pop. 12,000).

== Population ==
According to the 1921 census the voivodeship was inhabited by 1,992,810 people, of whom by nationality 1,853,654 were Poles (93.0%), 77,069 were Jews (3.9%), 49,896 were Ruthenians (2.5%), 9,570 were Germans (0.5%) and 2,621 were all others (0.1%). By religion 1,779,389 were Roman Catholics (89.3%), 152,926 were Jews (7.7%), 54,243 were Greek Catholic or Orthodox (2.7%), 5,841 were Protestants (0.3%) and 411 were all others.

According to the 1931 Polish census, the population was 2,297,802, with approximately 25% living in towns and cities. Poles were 91.3% of the population, Jews were 5.6%, Ukrainians were 2.6% and Germans were 0.4%. The Jews preferred to live in the cities and towns; in 1931 they made 19.2% of Voivodeship's urban population. Illiteracy rate (in 1931) was 13.7%, lower than the national average of 23.1%. In early 1939, population density of the province was 130 people per sq. kilometer, which was much higher than Poland's average of 83.

The detailed results of the 1931 census by county are presented below:

Linguistic (mother tongue) and religious structure of Kraków Voivodeship according to the 1931 census
County	Pop.	Polish	%	Yiddish & Hebrew	%	Ukrainian & Ruthenian	%	Other language %	Roman Catholic	%	Jewish	%	Uniate & Orthodox	%	Other religion %
Biała	139127	127089	91.3%	5932	4.3%	48	0.0%	4.4% (Note: Includes 4.3% Germans (5,922 people).)	126431	90.9%	9951	7.2%	197	0.1%	1.8%
Bochnia	113790	109717	96.4%	3847	3.4%	75	0.1%	0.1%	107399	94.4%	5656	5.0%	134	0.1%	0.5%
Brzesko	102226	100251	98.1%	1894	1.9%	20	0.0%	0.0%	97730	95.6%	4121	4.0%	66	0.1%	0.3%
Chrzanów	138061	127078	92.0%	10435	7.6%	88	0.1%	0.3%	125016	90.6%	12127	8.8%	240	0.2%	0.4%
Dąbrowa	66678	62620	93.9%	4016	6.0%	25	0.0%	0.1%	61584	92.4%	4807	7.2%	36	0.1%	0.3%
Gorlice	104805	76266	72.8%	3508	3.3%	24881	23.7%	0.2%	73788	70.4%	5578	5.3%	25092	23.9%	0.4%
Jasło	116146	103935	89.5%	4608	4.0%	7435	6.4%	0.1%	102213	88.0%	5786	5.0%	7659	6.6%	0.4%
Kraków City	219286	171206	78.1%	45828	20.9%	924	0.4%	0.6%	159372	72.7%	56515	25.8%	1894	0.9%	0.7%
Kraków County	187509	185567	99.0%	1569	0.8%	97	0.1%	0.1%	181836	97.0%	4138	2.2%	309	0.2%	0.6%
Limanowa	87279	85238	97.7%	1951	2.2%	29	0.0%	0.1%	84048	96.3%	2766	3.2%	43	0.0%	0.5%
Mielec	77465	71272	92.0%	5441	7.0%	48	0.1%	0.9%	69737	90.0%	6457	8.3%	72	0.1%	1.6%
Myślenice	102692	101878	99.2%	770	0.7%	16	0.0%	0.1%	99978	97.4%	2189	2.1%	32	0.0%	0.5%
Nowy Sącz	183867	148329	80.7%	10282	5.6%	24252	13.2%	0.5%	141857	77.2%	15135	8.2%	25060	13.6%	1.0%
Nowy Targ	129489	123877	95.7%	2571	2.0%	2156	1.7%	0.6%	121767	94.0%	4853	3.7%	2296	1.8%	0.5%
Ropczyce	110925	105700	95.3%	5101	4.6%	60	0.1%	0.0%	104033	93.8%	6410	5.8%	136	0.1%	0.3%
Tarnów	142365	124817	87.7%	17307	12.2%	102	0.1%	0.0%	120610	84.7%	21219	14.9%	293	0.2%	0.2%
Wadowice	145143	142852	98.4%	2070	1.4%	53	0.0%	0.2%	140469	96.8%	3665	2.5%	125	0.1%	0.6%
Żywiec	130949	129747	99.1%	915	0.7%	19	0.0%	0.2%	127685	97.5%	2245	1.7%	71	0.1%	0.7%
Total	2297802	2097439	91.3%	128045	5.6%	60328	2.6%	0.5%	2045553	89.0%	173618	7.6%	63755	2.8%	0.6%

== Voivodes ==
- Kazimierz Junosza-Gałecki 1 September 1921 – 19 December 1923
- Karol Olpiński 6 November 1923 – 16 November 1923 (acting)
- Władysław Kowalikowski 16 November 1923 – 7 July 1926 (acting till 19 December 1923 or 8 March 1924 ?)
- Ludwik Darowski 1 July 1926 – 31 December 1928
- Mikołaj Kwaśniewski 1 January 1929 – 25 June 1935
- Władysław Raczkiewicz 10 August 1935 – 13 October 1935
- Kazimierz Świtalski 3 December 1935 – 20 April 1936
- Michał Gnoiński 22 April 1936 – 8 September 1937
- Józef Tymiński 9 September 1937 – September 1939

== See also ==
- Poland's current Lesser Poland Voivodeship
