= Battle of Antakalnis =

Date	28 June 1812
Location	Antakalnis, Vilnius (then Russian Empire, now Lithuania)
Result	Franco-Polish victory

Belligerents
French Empire Duchy of Warsaw	Russian Empire

Units involved
I Reserve Cavalry Corps (vanguard)	1st Western Army (rearguard only)

The Battle of Antakalnis (Lithuanian: Antakalnio mūšis) was a battle between the Imperial Russian Army and the Grande Armée during French invasion of Russia. It took place in two stages on June 28, 1812, in the Antakalnis suburb of Vilnius. It also signified the beginning of French occupation in Vilnius.

This battle between the vanguard of Napoleon's forces and the Russian rearguard was a minor event compared to the decisive battle that Napoleon had desired immediately at the start of the campaign.

== Background ==
The fateful French invasion of Russia had begun a mere four days before this battle. Although the Russian military leadership had expected an invasion, Napoleon's sudden maneuver and crossing of the Nemunas at Kaunas partially surprised them nonetheless.

There were several alternative plans from the Russian side as to how fight Napoleon. The Russian generals considered defending Vilnius at Paneriai or counterattacking the French once they occupied the city. However, despite the inclination of Barclay de Tolly, commander of the 1st Western Army, to not give up Vilnius without a fight, the reports of Matvei Platov and Pyotr Bagration convinced him about the unpreparedness of his forces to strike the right-wing of Napoleon's forces. Thus, on June 27, the military commanders made the decision to concentrate Russian forces near Švenčionys, which was to be reached after 3 days of marching. In addition, Barclay de Tolly ordered the rearguard units to maintain contact with the enemy to delay their movement, and to burn all warehouses and bridges. These orders lead to the battles of Rykantai and Antakalnis. The British military historian Digby Smith notes that on June 28 all the Russian army magazines in Vilnius were burning ablaze, even if it was pouring rain that evening.

More broadly, the planned and orderly retreat of the Russian army thwarted Napoleon's plan to crush the enemy forces in a general battle near Vilnius.

Napoleon hoped to defeat the Tsar's army in a single decisive battle, then quickly negotiate a new treaty concerning the East and emerge victorious. When it became clear that the Russians had concentrated a huge army near Vilnius, Napoleon had expected the decisive battle to take place there, but the Russian military command was reluctant to attack the French and thus retreated with the main force.

Napoleon had sent Marshal Murat ahead with two cavalry corps (I and II Reserve Cavalry Corps), supported by 60 horse-artillery pieces, expecting to pin the Russians in place, but Russians withdrew before Murat could engage them after his rapid advance. The Russians fired some artillery, burned their stores, destroyed the bridge over the Neris, and abandoned the city. Vilnius therefore fell into French hands without as large a battle as Napoleon had wanted and the French found its warehouses and bridges destroyed.

== Prelude ==
The fighting for Vilnius, which began on June 28, ended with Napoleon's forces quickly defeating the Russian rearguard. In the morning, during the fighting at Rykantai, French light cavalry units scattered the Russian rearguard covering the retreat. French advance units then marched into Vilnius with little resistance. The Russians had decided to not attempt to defend the city and withdrew through Antakalnis. Before they retreated, they set fire to large food stores in Šnipiškės, as well as the bridge over the Neris River. At 9 AM, the Cossacks set the fires to the huge warehouses of the Russian Army as well as the Green Bridge, causing big black clouds in that part of the city.

== Battle ==
In the first phase of the engagement, a Russian rearguard unit composed of Cossacks of the Guard and jägers attacked and defeated a French hussar vanguard detachment from the 1st Light Cavalry Division under General Jean Pierre Joseph Bruguière. The French cavalry was from the 8th Hussar Regiment. The smaller French force suffered several dozen casualties and had several dozen men taken prisoner. Its commander, Captain Octave, brother of Colonel Philippe-Paul, comte de Ségur, was also captured.

Immediately after the first engagement ended, the Russian forces were attacked by a company of the Polish 6th Uhlan Regiment under the command of Major Tadeusz Suchorzewski (subordinated to Niemojewski's 15th Light Cavalry Brigade, itself part of the I Reserve Cavalry Corps). In the renewed fighting, the Polish troops successfully attacked the Russians before they had time to form up in battle order. Several dozen Russian soldiers were taken prisoner.

A small group of Vilnius University students also took part in the battle alongside the Polish troops.

== Sources ==
- Tomaszewicz, Andrzej (2005). "Przemarsz wojsk napoleońskich przez teren Litwy w czerwcu 1812 roku" [The march of Napoleon's troops through Lithuania in June 1812]. Nasz Czas (in Polish). 15 (664). Archived from the original on 22 December 2015.
- Januszkiewicz, Janusz (1912). Litwa w roku 1812 (PDF) (in Polish). Kraków and Warszawa.
- Nawrot, Dariusz (2008). Litwa i Napoleon w 1812 roku (in Polish). Katowice: Wydawnictwo Uniwersytetu Śląskiego. ISBN 9788322617489.
- Nawrot, Dariusz (2013). "Didžioji Armija Kaune ir jo apylinkėse 1812 m. birželį". Kauno istorijos metraštis (in Lithuanian). 13. ISSN 1822-2617.
- Smith, Digby (2004). Napoleon against Russia: a concise history of 1812. Great Britain: Pen and Sword Military. ISBN 9781783409587.
