= Greater Poland Uprising (1806) =

1806 Uprising during the War of the Fourth Coalition

Greater Poland uprising of 1806
- Part of the War of the Fourth Coalition
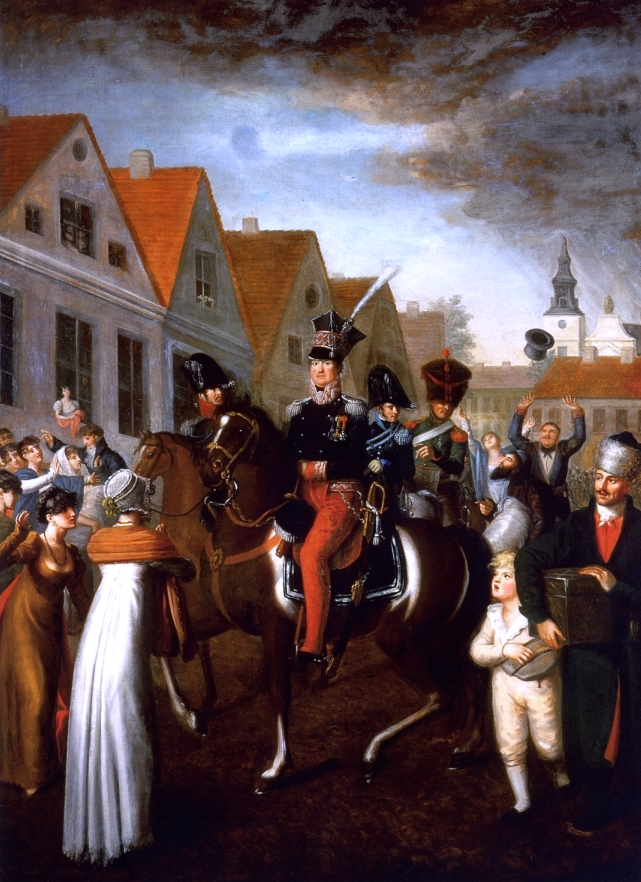
- Entrance of Jan Henryk Dąbrowski to Poznań painted by Jan Gładysz
| Date | 3 November 1806 – 23 February 1807 |
| Location | Greater Poland, Masovia, Pomerania |
| Result | Franco-Polish victory |
| Territorial changes | Creation of the Duchy of Warsaw |

Belligerents
| (France) French Empire; Polish rebels: Polish irregular insurgents (until 14 January 1807); Governing Commission (from 14 January 1807) | Kingdom of Prussia; Russian Empire |

Commanders and leaders
| (France) Napoléon Bonaparte; Jan Henryk Dąbrowski; Józef Poniatowski | (Kingdom of Prussia) Frederick William III (Kingdom of Prussia) Georg von Köhler (Kingdom of Prussia) Johann von Hundt (Kingdom of Prussia) Friedrich Georg Tilly (Russian Empire) Levin August von Bennigsen |

Strength
| Unknown French soldiers c. 23,000 Polish soldiers Unknown Pospolite ruszenie | |

The Greater Poland uprising of 1806 was a Polish military insurrection which occurred in the region of Wielkopolska, also known as Greater Poland, against the occupying Prussian forces after the Partitions of the Polish–Lithuanian Commonwealth (1772–1795).

The uprising was organized by General Jan Henryk Dąbrowski to help advancing French forces under Napoleon in liberating Poland from Prussian occupation. The Wielkopolska Uprising was a decisive factor that allowed the formation of the Duchy of Warsaw (1807) and the inclusion of Wielkopolska in the Duchy of Warsaw.

== Historical background ==
While the Kingdom of Prussia already possessed a large Polish population in Upper Silesia, it gained additional Polish citizens during the partitions of Poland. From the beginnings of Prussian rule Poles were subject to a series of measures aimed against them and their culture, notably the Polish language was abolished in favour of German.

The War of the Fourth Coalition between Napoleonic France and the Kingdom of Prussia gave hope to the Polish inhabitants of Greater Poland of recovering their independence and ending oppressive Prussian rule.

Napoleon, counting on the benefits of gaining control over lands on the other side of Prussia, sent a group of emissaries to South Prussia to collect information about the situation in the province and the sympathies of the Polish citizens. On 20 September 1806 the emperor issued orders to form a new division from Polish deserters from the Prussian army. There were so many that two days later, Napoleon decided to form a second division.

The open conflict between France and Prussia ensured that Prussia could only maintain a small number of troops in Greater Poland. Moreover, a large portion of those soldiers were Polish nationals. This caused a great deal of trouble for Prussian commanders; for instance, between 1 November and 20 December, 3000 Polish troops (^{1}/_{7}th) deserted from the Toruń Corps.

== Mission of General Dąbrowski ==
In order to organize a diversion on the back of Prussians, Napoleon chose General Jan Henryk Dąbrowski, who was staying in Italy. Dąbrowski was chosen for this mission because he had a great respect in Greater Poland from his military leadership during the uprising of 1794.

Napoleon sent a message to Dąbrowski on 5 October 1806, and on 22 October the General met with the Emperor at Dessau. During this audience, Napoleon ordered Dąbrowski to go to Poznań and organize regular Polish troops. After four days of preparation, Dąbrowski proposed to the French Emperor his plan of forming a Polish army of 40,000 soldiers. To realize this plan, Dąbrowski asked to have Polish officers from other Napoleonic units sent to him, and on his special request, Józef Wybicki was designated to become the future head of the civilian authorities. This group heard from Napoleon, who was already in Berlin, that "[Poles] have to deserve independence" and, when asked whether he would create a Polish State, Napoleon answered: "I will see whether the Poles are worthy of being a nation".

== Uprising ==
Dąbrowski sent emissaries before him to Poznań, to evaluate the situation. After they returned to the General with the news that the whole "region is full of patriotic spirit and joy about the success of the French Army", Dąbrowski and Wybicki entered the city on 3 November 1806 leading the first units of the French army. Their arrival became a large Polish patriotic demonstration. On this same day, Dąbrowski called Poles to stand with arms on Napoleon's side and fight against Prussian occupation. Dąbrowski and Wybicki created Voivodship Commissions (Komisja wojewódzka) whose tasks were to take administrative control and keep the area quiet, preventing fights about social and economical issues.

Dąbrowski's and Wybicki's proclamation was enthusiastically adopted by the bourgeoisie but with reserve by the szlachta. Therefore, in the newly created Poznań Department, Polish units were formed mostly in large urban areas like Poznań, and in the countryside, mobilisation was very slow.

In the Kalisz Department, a special Proclamation for this area was announced on 9 November. Large centers of uprising fighters formed in Kalisz and Konin. On 10 November, Polish fighters engaged in battles against Prussian troops near Ostrzeszów and Kępno; then, on 13 November the uprising spread to the area around Sieradz.

Poles had the most difficult fighting in the Bydgoszcz Department. As Commander of the newly created Polish units in this region, General Amilkar Kosiński had to fight against the largest Prussian troops in Greater Poland on one side and with an uncooperative French intendent on the other one, using troops with very little training or experience.

Meanwhile, Dąbrowski was already creating a regular army, mobilising one man from each ten cottages, and on 3 December appointed the pospolite ruszenie as auxiliaries to the regular troops. These regular Army units, alongside some irregular uprising troops, cleaned Greater Poland of some pockets of remaining Prussian units. An uprising spread in other regions, and on 19 November, fighters took control over the Jasna Góra fortress.

== Advance on Masovia and Warsaw ==
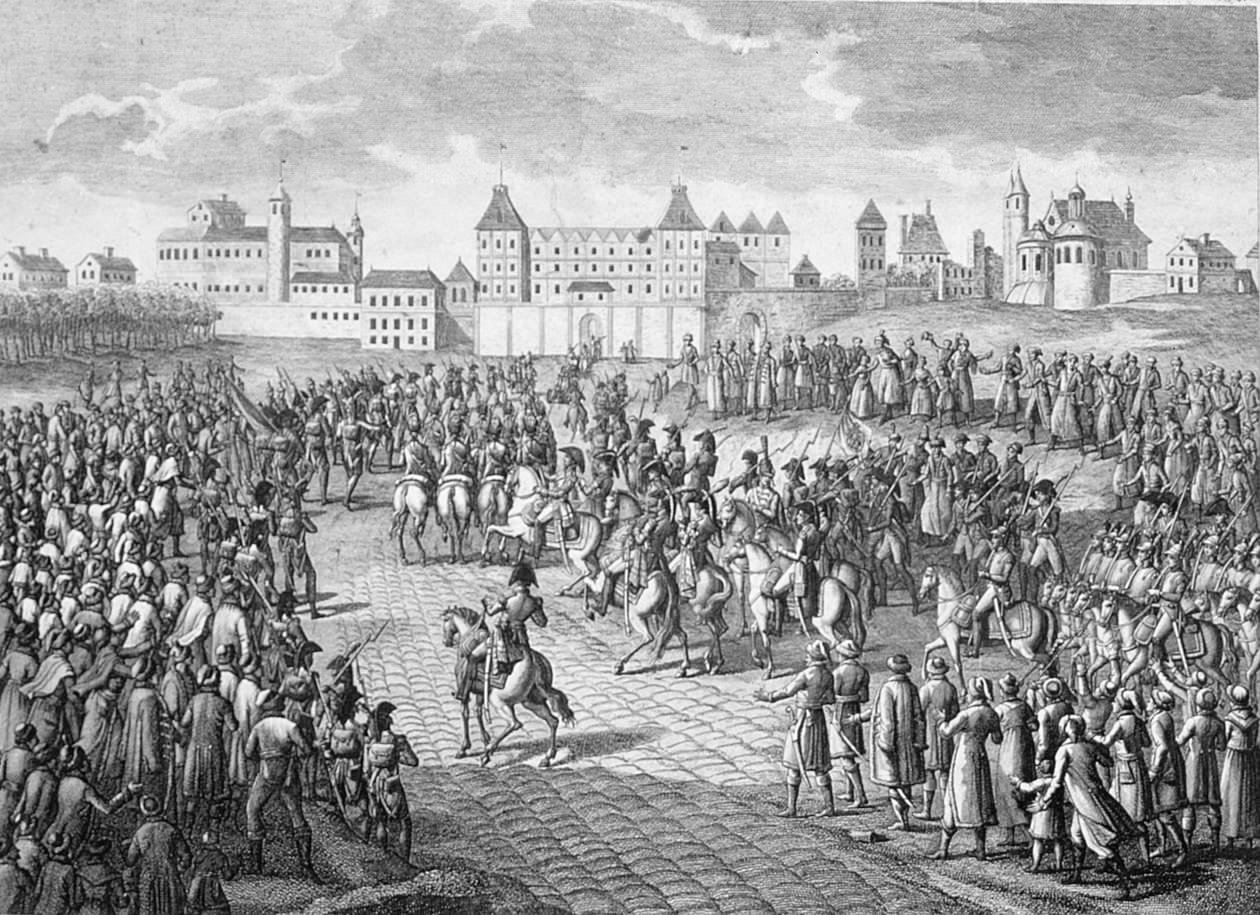
Joachim Murat enters Warsaw on 28 November 1806

In the same time, the Russian army under command of Bennigsen, invited by the Prussian King, captured Warsaw on 2 November and created a bridgehead on the left bank of the Vistula river.

Meanwhile, the French helped the insurgents and liberated Kłodawa on 17 November. Then, they marched east and fought for the first time near Bolimów, where they finally defeated the Russians in two skirmishes on the 22 November. After that, Murat's Corps fought another battle near Sochaczew four days later and approached near Warsaw. Bennigsen evacuated the garrison on 27 November and burned the bridge, then he ordered to murder Polish citizens in the city right-bank district Praga (like 12 years earlier). The French captured the city just a few hours later. Joachim Murat entered Warsaw welcomed as liberator.

The combined Franco-Polish maneuver cut the enemy country in half and isolated about 30,000 Prussian soldiers in Silesia.

Mainly due to the action of Wybicki at the beginning of January 1807, the regular Polish army, organised like other Napoleon's armies, had 23,000 soldiers (20,000 of them were from the Poznań and Kalisz Departments). The French Emperor stayed in Poznań between 27 November and 12 December 1806.

Napoleon himself arrived at Warsaw four days later, when he created a new plan called "Pultusk operation". The Emperor wanted the cross the Vistula river and Destroy Bennigsen's forces. The French maneuver started on 23 December, when the Grande Armée attacked the Russian rearguard which withdrew after a few hours. Napoleon finally engaged Bennigsen in two big battles at Pułtusk and Gołymin on a Christmas Day two days later. However, despite achieving a tactical victory, the Russians withdrew. The French now controlled the right bank of the Vistula and attempted to destroy Bennigsen's army. This situation ultimately led to the bloody battle of Eylau on 7–8 February 1807.

== Pomeranian Campaign ==
On 1 January 1807, Dąbrowski was near Łowicz, where he received from the hands of Wincenty Krasiński a bulawa of hetman Stefan Czarniecki. The great merits of Dąbrowski and his popularity among soldiers weren't given much consideration, in the appointment of the Chief of the War Office in the Ruling Commission (szef Dyrekcji Wojny w Komisji Rządzącej). Józef Poniatowski, who was unfavourable to Dąbrowski, was appointed instead. Napoleon chose him because he wanted to guarantee the cooperation of the Polish aristocracy. A large difference between Dąbrowski and Poniatowski was exemplified during the writing of the Polish Army Code. Poniatowski wanted to keep corporal punishment, but Dąbrowski loudly opposed against it. To avoid this conflict, Napoleon decided that Polish Army would adopt the French code.

On 3 January, French marshal Louis-Alexandre Berthier gave the order to existing units of planned divisions of Poznań and Kalisz Departments to form one brigade from each Department. The Commander of the Poznań Brigade was General Wincenty Axamitowski and the Kalisz Brigade was commanded by General Stanisław Fiszer. Both brigades of infantry formed a division commanded by general Dąbrowski. Brigades were strengthened by 300 Polish cavalry units, in addition to the unit from the Warsaw Department, that were both transformed in a unique regiment of cavalry commanded by the son of Jan Henryk Dąbrowski – Lt. Col. Jan Michał Dąbrowski. All the units of the new division, that started their march on 7 January, had to meet in Bydgoszcz.

Meanwhile, the units commanded by Amilkar Kosiński, which had been fighting against regular Prussian troops since December, won the battle of Koronowo and marched to Świecie, forcing the enemy to leave the town and securing this place of concentration for the newly created division.

Before the beginning of the new campaign, the main Polish troops were strengthened and reorganized into three divisions: Poznań Division commanded by J. H. Dąbrowski, Kalisz Division commanded by Józef Zajączek and Warsaw Division commanded by Józef Poniatowski. Kalisz Division was sent to the siege of Grudziądz and the Warsaw Division moved northwards with the whole French Army in the direction of Danzig. At this time, 6000 soldiers of the Poznań Division stayed near Bydgoszcz and later advanced on Gniezno and Dirschau. Both towns were captured, but the Poles were forced to retreat by Prussian troops. Later on, Poniatowski ordered a part of the pospolite ruszenie that weakened the Poznań Division to disband, which were returned as reinforcements in February 1807. After that, only the troops of Gen. Kosiński were fighting in this area.

After a reorganization, Poznań Division was composed of 6 battalions of infantry, 3 squadrons of cavalry and 2,000 pospolite ruszenie commanded by Gen. Michał Sokolnicki. On 15 February, cavalry again captured Dirschau, but was once again forced to retreat. 8 days later, on 23 February, the whole division attacked the town which was defended by a strong Prussian garrison. After 7 hours of battle, Poles captured Dirschau, but Gen. Dąbrowski was wounded, forcing him to leave his division for a while, and his son was badly injured as well. Therefore, J. M. Dąbrowski was promoted to the rank of Brigade General and moved to the Invalide Corps. After the battle, Gen. Kosiński became the new division commander.

Earlier, in January 1807, Dąbrowski had formed from the Poznań troops, a Division group commanded by Col. Garczyński. This unit captured Schneidemühl, Deutsch Krone and Wieluń. February 1807, Garczyński's group was subordinated to Gen. Kosiński and later, with some troops of pospolite ruszenie, was sent to fight near Neustettin. At this time, the troops of Sokolnicki captured Stolp in Pommern and, later on, took part in the siege of Danzig, which surrendered in May. Also in May, Poznań Division, renamed as 3rd Polish Division, returned under the command of Gen. J. H. Dąbrowski. After the capture of Danzig, Polish troops fought also in Masuria, including the battle of Friedland.

== Aftermath ==
The Pomeranian Campaign was ended by the capitulation of Königsberg on 15 June 1807, the later treaties of Tilsit and the recognition of the Duchy of Warsaw by the Kingdom of Prussia.

However, there was a more immediate effect. By the time of the uprising, the Prussian army, previously thought among the strongest of Europe, had been fought to almost the point of total liquidation. Napoleon had destroyed the majority of the Prussian army only months after the declaration of war, and the only significant force loyal to the Prussian regime left was garrisoning Prussian Poland. These troops were expected to reinforce the Russians and continue fighting the French. With this Polish uprising supported by French military operations, this was no longer possible for the simple reason that outside a handful of Prussian units who managed to escape and join the Russians, the Prussian army had been completely and systematically wiped out. Russia would face France alone.

== See also ==
- Greater Poland uprising (1918–1919)
- Sejny Uprising in 1919

== Notes ==
| Preceded by Battle of Lübeck | Napoleonic Wars; Greater Poland uprising (1806) | Succeeded by Siege of Hamelin |
