= Tadeusz Suchorzewski =

- Born: Tadeusz Maria Michał Suchorzewski; 1778; Sarbinowo, Polish-Lithuanian Commonwealth
- Died: 17 March 1852 (aged 74–75); Paris
- Burial place: Montparnasse Cemetery
- Military career
- Allegiance: French First Republic (1799–1806); Duchy of Warsaw (1807–1814); Congress Poland (1815–1830); Polish National Government (1830–1831)
- Conflicts: Napoleonic Wars; War of the Second Coalition; Battle of Hohenlinden; War of the Fourth Coalition; Siege of Danzig; War of the Fifth Coalition; Austro-Polish War; Battle of Raszyn; French invasion of Russia; Battle of Ostrovno (WIA); Battle of Borodino (WIA); Battle of Tarutino (WIA); Battle of Maloyaroslavets; Battle of Berezina; War of the Sixth Coalition; German campaign of 1813; Battle of Leipzig (WIA); November Uprising; Battle of Warsaw (surrendered)
- Awards: Virtuti Militari; Order of St Anne; Order of St Stanislaus

Maria Tadeusz Michał Józefat Suchorzewski also known as Tadeusz Suchorzewski (1778–1852), was a soldier in the Polish Legions, cavalry officer in the army of the Duchy of Warsaw, participant in the November Uprising, general in the Polish Army and émigré.

== Early life ==
Suchorzewski was born in 1778 in Sarbinowo and baptised on 27 September 1778. He was the son of Ignacy of the Zaremba coat of arms, a standard-bearer of Bydgoszcz and owner of the villages of Gołuchów, Tursko and Macewo and Marianna Anna née Sokolnicka.

== Military career ==
=== Napoleonic Wars ===
Suchorzewski decided to devote himself to a military career and in the summer of 1799, he travelled to Italy, where, on 24 July of that year, he began his service in the First Polish Legion commanded by General Jan Henryk Dąbrowski. In 1800, together with other officers from the disbanded Legion, he travelled via Dresden to France, where he enlisted in the Danube Legion, commanded by General Karol Kniaziewicz. On 11 August of that year, Suchorzewski became a corporal in the 1st Battalion, and on 18 September he was promoted to second lieutenant. That year, he took part in the War of the Second Coalition, during which he distinguished himself at the Battle of Hohenlinden. He received a favourable assessment from his relative, General Michał Sokolnicki, and, thanks to his patronage, was promoted on 22 March 1801 to lieutenant of the 9th Company of the 1st Battalion. Following the transfer of the Danube Legion to Italy, Suchorzewski submitted a request for discharge on 25 June of that year in Florence, citing family reasons; he was granted this on 17 August, although he still appeared on the 1st Battalion's roll of service on 22 December. He returned from Tuscany to his hometown of Sarbinowo.

Following the entry of Napoleon's troops into Greater Poland, Suchorzewski joined the Poznań Honour Guard on 10 November 1806. Later that year, holding the rank of captain, he transferred to the 1st National Cavalry Regiment, subsequently renamed the 5th Mounted Rifle Regiment. In the ranks of this unit, he fought in January 1807 in Pomerania near Tczew, Miłobędź and Gdańsk. During the Battle of Passenheim, he was taken prisoner by the Russians on 1 January of that year and remained in captivity for six months. Upon his return to the regiment, he was awarded the Knight's Cross of the Order of Virtuti Militari. Together with his regiment, he took part in the Austro-Polish War and fought in the Battle of Raszyn On 1 May, he was promoted to squadron commander; he commanded a squadron at Sandomierz, Jarosław and Włostowice in 1809. On 6 October, he was promoted to major and transferred to the 6th Uhlan Regiment, with which he was stationed in Warsaw from 19 December. As part of the regiment, he subsequently took part in the War with Russia of 1812. On 28 June, Suchorzewski routed a detachment of Russian cavalry near Vilnius and, at the head of his regiment and took the city.

Suchorzewski was wounded at the Battles of Ostrowo, Borodino and Tarutino. On 11 or 14 October, he was promoted to colonel, and in November of that year Suchorzewski assumed command of the 6th Uhlan Regiment. During the retreat of the Grand Army, he fought at Bobrovniki and Maloyaroslavets and took part in the crossing of the Berezina. In the German campaign of 1813, he commanded his regiment as part of the 4th Reserve Cavalry Corps. On 15 September of that year, he routed a detachment of Cossacks near Neustadt, but at the Battle of Leipzig, having been struck several times on the head with a sabre, he was taken prisoner by the Russians. On 28 October, he was awarded the Officer's Cross of the Legion of Honour in absentia. He was released from captivity after the end of the Napoleonic hostilities.

=== Military career in Congress Poland ===
On 20 January 1815, Suchorzewski assumed command of the 2nd Mounted Rifle Regiment in the newly formed Army of Congress Poland. On 28 October 1818, he was appointed brigadier-general; he assumed command of the 1st Brigade in the Uhlan Division, which was stationed for a long period in Międzyrzecz. In Warsaw, from 1820 onwards, he was a member, holding the rank of journeyman, of the Masonic lodge 'United Brothers', which brought together former Napoleonic soldiers. The Commander-in-Chief, Grand Duke Konstanty, regarded Suchorzewski as a capable commander. During this period, he was awarded the Order of St Anne, 2nd Class (3 December 1815 and 16 October 1816) and was awarded the Order of St Stanislaus, 3rd Class (17 October 1819) and 2nd class (18 February 1820), Order of St Anne, 1st class and 2nd class (3 December 1815, 17 October 1816 8 May 1829) and the award of the Badge of Honour for 20 years' service (24 May 1830).

=== November Uprising ===
Following the outbreak of the November Uprising, Suchorzewski, on the orders of General Józef Chłopicki, allowed the retreating Russian troops, commanded by Grand Duke Konstanty, to pass through. On 23 January 1831, he assumed command of a division of uhlans, reinforced by artillery. In early February, he was tasked with defending Siedlce; however, on 9 February of that year, he withdrew from the town under pressure from significantly weaker Russian forces. For this, the Commander-in-Chief, General Michał Radziwiłł, relieved him of his command of the division on 22 February; on 26 February, he was transferred to the reserve. Suchorzewski unfortunate command was sharply criticised by, amongst others, General Józef Załuski. In the final phase of the uprising, during the siege of Warsaw, Suchorzewski, summoned by the Commander-in-Chief, General Kazimierz Małachowski, took part in a war council on 7 September. Following the capitulation of Warsaw, on 13 September he was assigned to the staff of the new Commander-in-Chief, General Maciej Rybiński. During a meeting of the general staff on 28 September in Szpetal, Suchorzewski was one of five generals (alongside Ludwik Pac, Stanisław Wojczyński, Stefan Ziemięcki and Emilian Węgierski) who opposed the unconditional surrender of the insurgent forces.

== Exile and death ==
Following the fall of the November Uprising, Suchorzewski travelled through Prussia to France, where he settled permanently. For his participation in the uprising, the Russian government confiscated his estate at Gumbele. Whilst in exile, Suchorzewski was not politically active. He died on 17 March 1852 in Paris and was buried at Montparnasse Cemetery.

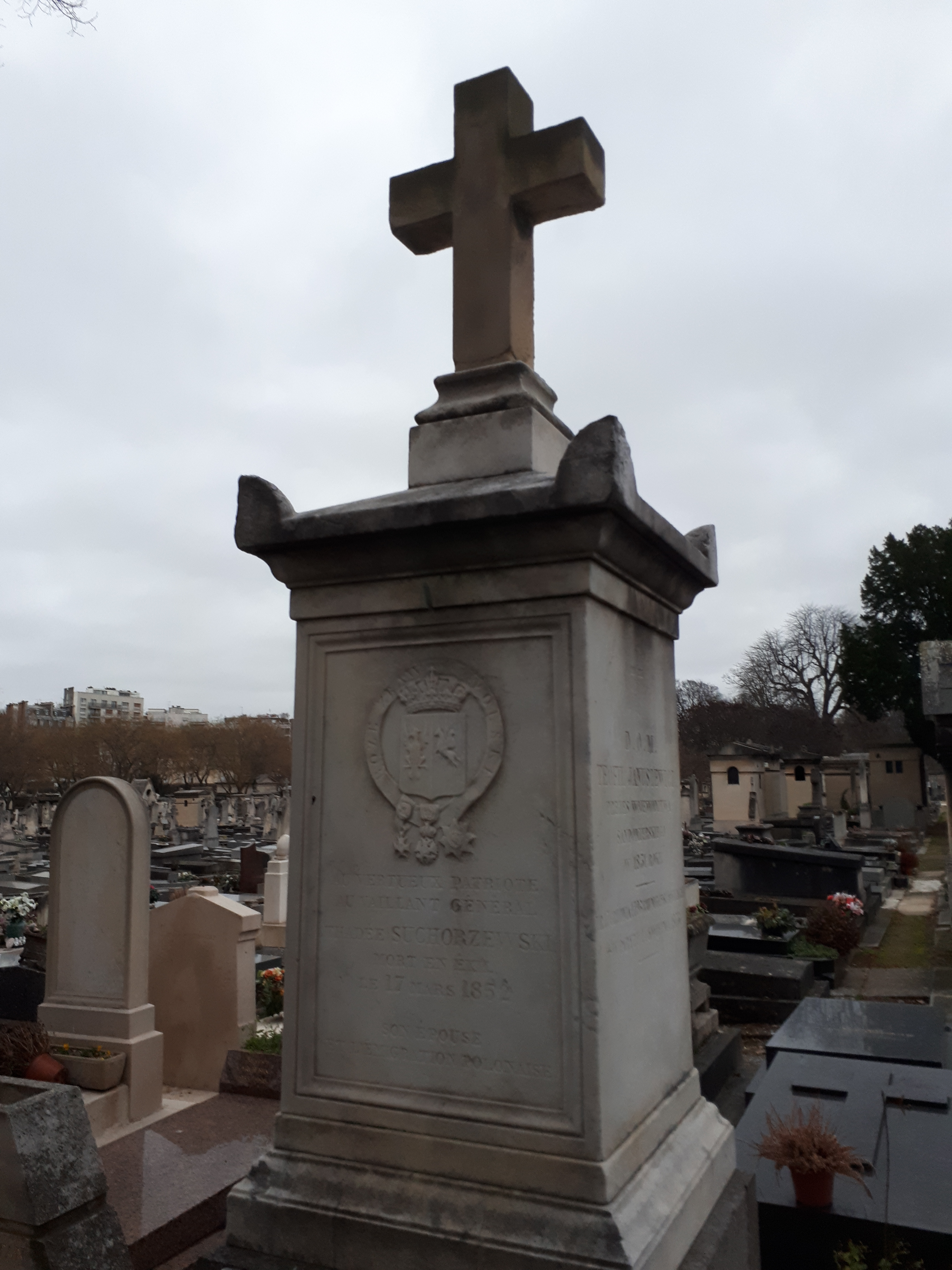
Suchorzewski's grave in Montparnasse Cemetery

== Medals and awards ==
- Order of Saint Stanislaus II and III class (1819, 1820)
- Order fo St Anna I and II class (1815, 1816 and 1829)
- Knight's Cross of the Order of Virtuti Militari (1807)
- Officer's Cross of the Legion of Honour (1813)
- Badge of Honour for 20 years' service (1830).
