= Izrael Abraham Staffel =

Polish inventor (1814–1884)

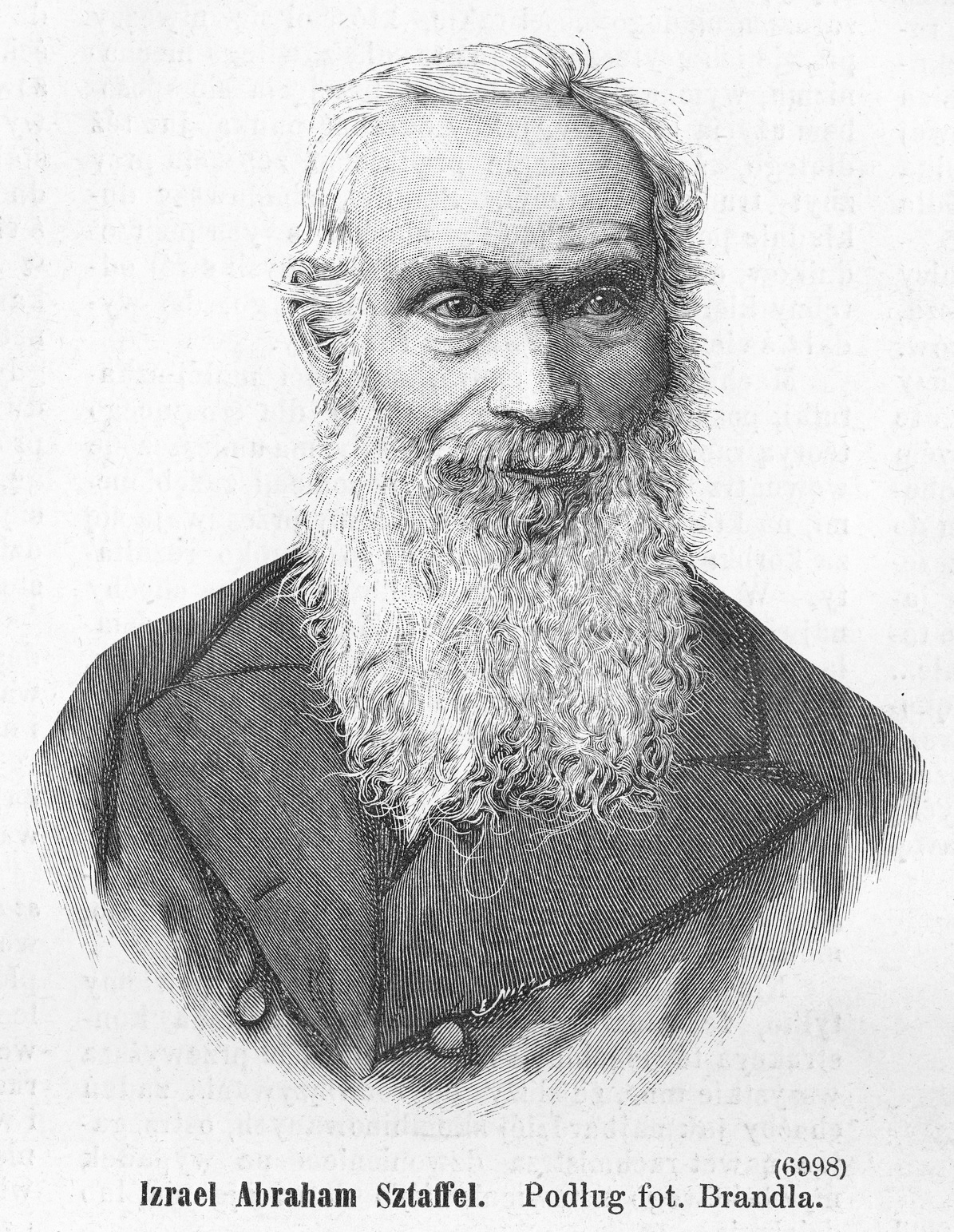
- A woodcut of Staffel by Edward Nicz, 1885
- Born: 1815; Warsaw, Warsaw Department, Duchy of Warsaw
- Died: 1884 (aged 68–69); Warsaw, Warsaw Governorate, Congress Poland
- Known for: Innovating the arithmometer

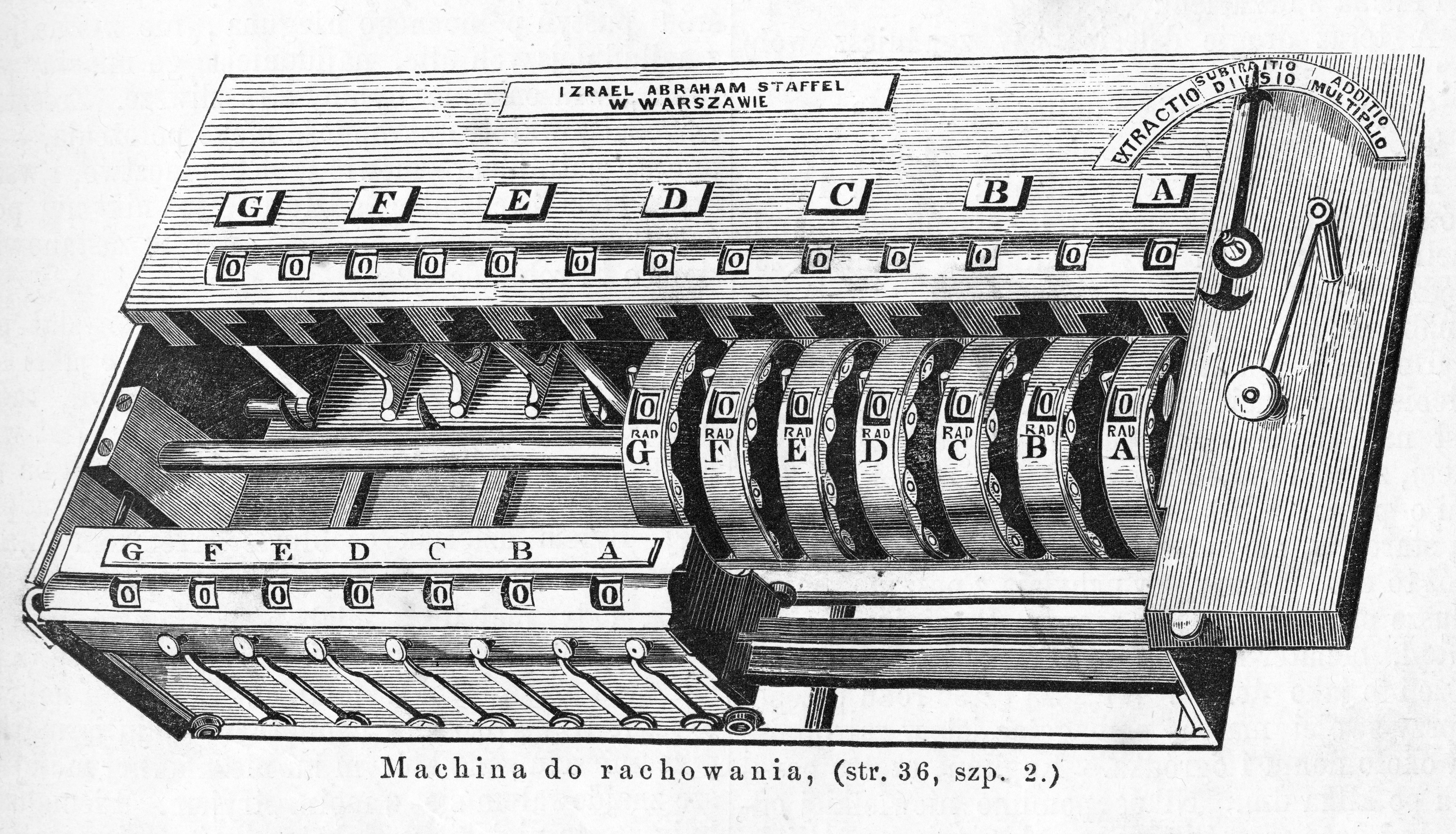
Staffel's calculator

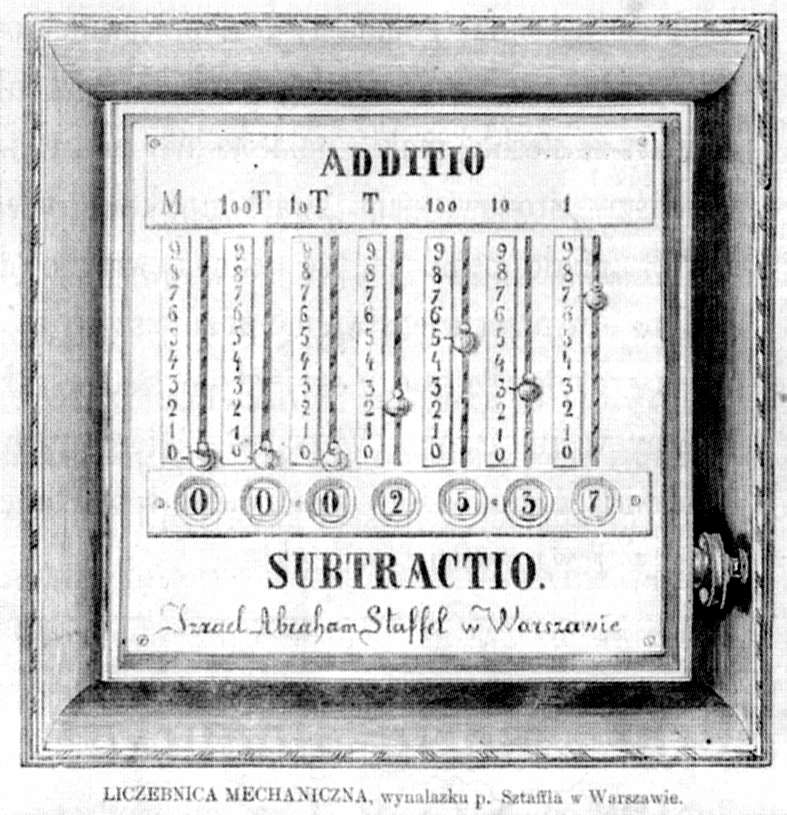
Staffel's adding machine

Izrael Abraham Staffel (1814–1884) was a Polish-Jewish inventor, watchmaker, mechanic, designer of calculating machines.

Staffel was born in 1814 in Warsaw to an impoverished Jewish family. He received an elementary education in a Jewish school and was then sent to a watchmaker to continue his education. He taught himself Polish in order that he could read technical educational books. Then in 1833 at the age of 19 he received a concession to open a watchmakers shop in Warsaw.

He took great interest in mechanical calculating machines. In 1845, at an industrial exhibition in Warsaw, he exhibited for the first time a calculating machine he had designed and produced. The result of ten years work, this machine was able to add, subtract, divide, multiply and obtain a square root. The machine earned a silver medal at this exhibition.

In 1846 Staffel's machine was shown at an exhibition in St Petersburg and received with high regard. The machine was later presented to the Russian Emperor, who ordered that 1,500 silver roubles be paid to Staffel.

He continued to make improvements to the machine and in 1851 he went to London to exhibit it at The Great Exhibition in Hyde Park. Staffel was awarded a gold medal for the best machine of this kind.

He also designed and produced several other things; an anemometer; an apparatus for testing the composition of metal alloys based on Archimedes' principle; a ventilator fan; and a two-colour printing press.

The two-colour printing press he designed and produced was used for printing of the first Polish stamps in 1860. The machine was able to print at the rate of 1,000 sheets per hour. He had also added a copy counter to the machine that ensured a precise count of sheets printed. This machine was later used to print banknotes.

Despite his designs and inventions Staffel died, as he was born, in poverty.
