= 3rd Division (Duchy of Warsaw) =

- 3 Dywizja
- Allegiance: Duchy of Warsaw

Commanders
- Notable commanders: Jan Henryk Dąbrowski

The 3rd Division (Polish: 3 Dywizja) – is a military division in the Duchy of Warsaw.

== Formation and organisation ==
From the 26 January 1807 the 3rd Division functioned as the Poznań Legion (Polish: Legia Poznańska). In organising it, eight battalions were formed in the Poznań department and four in the Bydgoszcz department. Subsequently, the number of battalions was reduced to eight.

On 4 June 1807, Minister of War Józef Poniatowski issued an order introducing a new numbering system for units. Its regiments were numbered from 9 to 12. In 1808 The Legion was reorganised and the 3rd Division was formed. Its commander was the former commander of the Poznań Legion, General Jan Henryk Dąbrowski.

On the 10th May 1808 Under the Treaty of Bayonne, Napoleon took over the 8,000-strong Polish Division, consisting of the 4th, 7th and 9th Infantry Regiments, into French service. On 14 August 1808, Antoni Sułkowski's 9th Infantry Regiment from General Dąbrowski's division marched from Łowicz to Spain.

At the end of August 1808, Antoni Downarowicz's 10th Infantry Regiment from Wschowa and Stanisław Mielżyński's 11th Infantry Regiment from Poznań were sent to Gdańsk, leaving their bases in Łęczyca. On 8 September, Prince Poniński's 12th Infantry Regiment marched from Rawicz to Toruń. Kazimierz Turno's 5th Regiment of Mounted Rifles, serving on the Pilica River, around Pyzdry and near Warsaw, was sent to the Niemen River in October, while Dominik Dziewanowski's 6th Regiment of Uhlans was sent from Łabiszyn to Toruń. In this situation, General Jan Henryk Dąbrowski remained a ‘general without an army’. At his request, Prince Józef Poniatowski granted him leave.

== Structural organisation within the division ==
Following the reorganisation and personnel changes, the division's status in mid-1808 was as follows:

Chain of command of the 3rd Division:

- Division commander – Gen. Jan Henryk Dąbrowski (on indefinite leave)
- Major commander of the division – Col. Maurycy Hauke (Note: Deputy Division Commander)
- Chief of Staff – Col. Czesław Pakosz
- Brigade commanders: Gen. Michał Sokolnicki, Gen. Michał Grabowski (Note: Sent to Gdańsk as garrison commander)
- commander's aide – Lt Col. Antoni Cedrowski
- Chief health officer – Puchalski

Regiments:

- 9 Infantry Regiment
- 10 Infantry Regiment
- 11 Infantry Regiment
- 12 Infantry Regiment
- 5 Mounted Rifle regiment
- 6 Uhlan Regiment
- 3 Infantry Artillery Battalion
