= 9th Infantry Regiment (Duchy of Warsaw) =

- 9 Pułk Piechoty
- Active: 1806 - 1813
- Disbanded: 1813
- Allegiance: Duchy of Warsaw
- Branch: Army
- Type: Infantry
- Size: 2050 soldiers - 1809
- Part of: 3rd Division
- Garrison/HQ: Leszno
- Engagements: Peninsular War; French Invasion of Russia

Commanders
- Notable commanders: Antoni Paweł Sułkowski; Michał Cichocki

9th Infantry Regiment (Polish: 9 pułk piechoty) (Note: Initially as the 1st Infantry Regiment. By order of the Minister of War, Prince Józef Poniatowski, on 4 June 1807, the unit was renamed the 9th Infantry Regiment.) – was a Polish infantry regiment in the Army of the Duchy of Warsaw.

== Formation and history ==
The 9th Infantry Regiment was formed at the turn of 1806 and 1807 in Gniezno as the 1st Regiment of the Poznań Legion Infantry (Polish: 1 pułk piechoty Legii Poznańskiej). It participated in the Pomeranian campaign of 1807 – soldiers from the regiment fought near Tczew, among other places, and also took part in the sieges of Gdańsk and Kołobrzeg. After the signing of the Treaty of Tilsit, the 9th Infantry Regiment's garrison was at Leszno.

In 1808, it was selected as one of three Polish infantry regiments (along with the 4th and 7th) to be sent to Spain. In the spring of 1808 the regiment landed in Spain and by the end of 1809 it numbered 2050 soldiers. According to the 1810 staffing table, the regiment consisted of a 27-person staff and three infantry battalions, each with six companies. The battalion staffs were to have 4 people, and the companies 136 soldiers. In total, 2,487 soldiers were to serve in the regiment. In fact, the unit's personnel strength was slightly lower.

The 9th Infantry Regiment took part in the battles of Almonacid and Ocañą. In the spring of 1812, a decision was made to withdraw the Polish Division from Spain. During preparations for the French invasion of Russia in 1812, the regiment was incorporated into the structures of General Girard's 28th Division.

After the end of the French retreat from Russia, The 9th Regiment marched through the Duchy of Warsaw until it reached German territory. There, Napoleon ordered the remnants of the 4th, 7th and 9th Infantry Regiments to form a new 4th Infantry Regiment under the command of the former commander of the 9th Regiment, Colonel Michał Cichocki. At the start of June 1813 it was incorporated into Jan Henryk Dąbrowski's Division

After the abdication of Napoleon, Alexander I of Russia agreed to send Polish troops back to their country. They were to form the basis for the creation of the Polish Army under the command of Grand Duke Konstantin Pavlovich. On 13 June 1814, the regiment was assigned a concentration point in Łomża. However, the regiment was not recreated, as the Kingdom of Poland's army only had 12 infantry regiments. New infantry regiments were only formed after the outbreak of the November Uprising when the 1st Regiment of the Kraków Province was formed, later renamed the 9th Line Infantry Regiment.

== Regimental commanders ==
Regiment commanders:

- Col. Antoni Paweł Sułkowski (29 November 1806),
- Col. Michał Cichocki (20 March 1810).

== Battles and skirmishes ==
Battles and skirmishes:

Battles and skirmishes	Date
Tczew	23 February 1807
Gniew	2 March 1807
Siege of Danzig and Kolberg	Spring 1807
Herencia	June 1809
Toleda	July 1809
Almonacid	11 August 1809
Ocaña	19 November 1809
La Carolina	Early 1810
Malaga	5 February 1810
Ronda, Lubrin, Baza and Moro	Early 1811
Ronda	14 March 1811
Utrera	15 April and 3 July 1811
Lanjaron	19 August 1810
Motril	21 August 1810
Czaszniki	1812
Smolany, Siege of Szpandawy	1813

== Uniform ==
Andrzej Daleki, originally a soldier in the 3rd Infantry Regiment of the Poznań Legion (11th Infantry Regiment of the Duchy of Warsaw), and then the 9th Regiment, described the uniform of Polish soldiers during the Pomeranian campaign as: 'a navy blue uniform with white lapels and buttons, with a red collar, a navy blue square cap with white cords and a Polish bow at the front, navy blue trousers with green piping and boots.'

The dress code of 3 September 1810 did not lead to complete standardisation of the infantry uniform. Some regiments differed significantly from the regulations. (Note: Differences presented by Gembarzewski based on contemporary drawings, accounts and other regimental documents) In the 9th Infantry Regiment, the cut was the same as in the 4th Infantry Regiment: a crimson collar with a navy blue trim, white lapels, crimson sleeve lapels with a white trim, navy blue sleeve tabs, and epaulettes with a white trim; white buttons.
