= Coat of arms of the Masovian Voivodeship =

Polish coat of arms

- Armiger: Masovian Voivodeship
- Adopted: 29 May 2006 (current version)
- Shield: Red Iberian style escutcheon
- Compartment: White (silver) eagle with raised wings, and its head turned left, with yellow (golden) beak with tongue, and yellow (golden) legs

The coat of arms that serves as the official symbol of the Masovian Voivodeship, Poland, consists of a red escutcheon, that features a white (silver) eagle, with raised wings, and its head turned left. Its current version had been designed by Andrzej Heidrich, and adopted in 2006.

== Design ==
The coat of arms of the Masovian Voivodeship has a red Iberian style escutcheon with square top and rounded base. It features a white (silver) eagle with raised wings, and its head turned left. It has a yellow (golden) beak with tongue, and yellow (golden) legs. The design of the coat of arms had been based on the design used by the Masovian Voivodeship of the Crown of the Kingdom of Poland, used between 1526 and 1795.

== History ==
=== Masovian duchies and the Kingdom of Poland ===
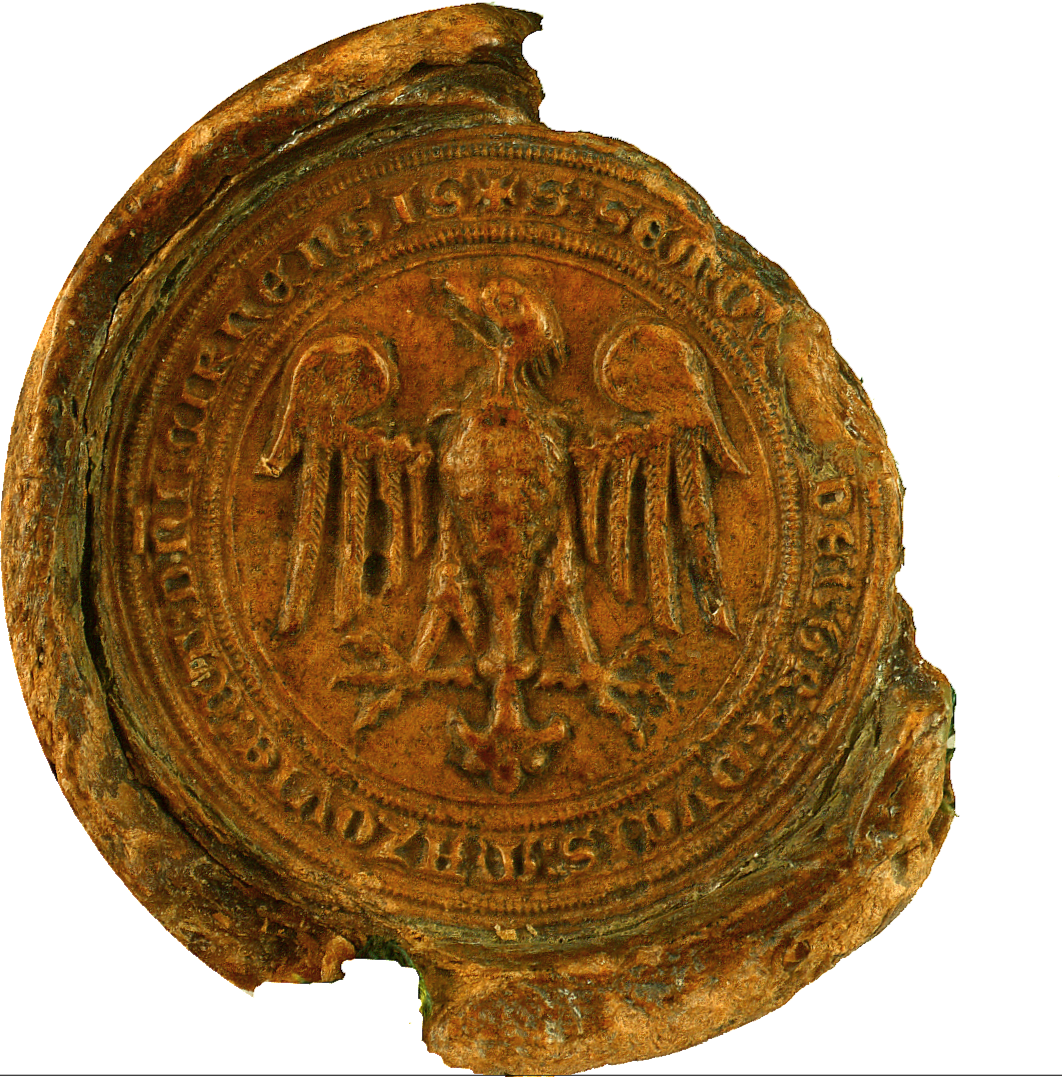
The 14th century seal of Siemowit III, Duke of Masovia.

The coat of arms of the Duchy of Warsaw.

The coat of arms of the Masovian Voivodeship from 1526 to 1795.

The design of the coat of arms had originated from the seal used by Siemowit III, Duke of Masovia, in 14th century, that depicted an eagle with raised wings, and its head facing left. From 1370 to 1381, duke Siemowit III was a sole ruler of the Duchy of Masovia. In 1381, the state had been partitioned by the sons of Siemowit III. In such division, the areas under the control of duke Siemowit IV, the duchies of Płock, and Rawa, continued using the design of the seal of their father, as a coat of arms with white (silver) eagle on a red background. At the same time, Janusz I of Warsaw, duke of the Duchy of Warsaw, begun using the coat of arms divided into 4 equal fields, with top left and bottom right fields were white, with a red dragon on them, while top right and bottom left fields were white with a red eagle on them. The design of the coat of arms with a white (silver) eagle on a red background continued being used as a symbol Masovian duchies until 1526, when the area was incorporated into the Crown of the Kingdom of Poland, where it was rearranged into the Masovian Voivodeship. The voivodeship continued using the similar design of the coat of arms, until 1795, when it ceased to exist in the Third Partition of Poland.

=== Congress Poland ===
The coat of arms of the Masovian Voivodeship of Congress Poland, from 1816 to 1837, and the Masovian Governorate, from 1837 to 1844.

The Masovian Voivodeship of the Congress Poland had been established on 16 January 1816. Its coat of arms featured four equally-sized fields. The top left field featured a red background with a white (silver) eagle, with raised wings, its head turned left, and a yellow (golden) legs. The top right field featured a yellow (golden) background, with a left-facing half of a black lion, joined with a right-facing half of a white (silver) eagle, both wearing together a yellow (golden) crown on their heads. The bottom left field featured a background divided vertically onto two identical stripes, white and red. It depicted a left-facing half of a red lion, joined with a right-facing half of a white (silver) eagle, both wearing together a yellow (golden) crown on their heads. The bottom right field featured a red background, with a black eagle with raised wings, its head turned left, and a yellow (golden) legs, and a yellow (golden) letter R in a ring, placed on its chest. The four charges represented a historical voivodeships (provinces) that used to exist within the borders of the voivodeship. Those were from left to right, and from top to bottom: Masovian Voivodeship, Łęczyca Voivodeship, voivodeships of Brześć Kujawski and Inowrocław, Łęczyca Voivodeship, and Rawa Voivodeship. On 7 March 1837, the voivodeship had been replaced by Masovian Governorate, which continued using the same coat of arms, until its disestablishment on 31 December 1844, when it was incorporated into then-established Warsaw Governorate.

The coat of arms of the Warsaw Governorate, used from 1845 to 1866.

In 1845, the Warsaw Governorate had established a new coat of arms, in form of a shield divided into seven fields, in three rows. The two bottom rows consisted of four rectangular fields of equal sizes, with two fields in both rows. The top row consisted of three triangular fields, with curved boundaries between them. It was dived into two smaller fields that bordered the sidewall and the row below, and a field twice the size of other two, located in the middle of the row, bordering the top wall. The top left field featured a red background, with a white (silver) Lamb of God facing right, with its head turned left, and a yellow (golden) aureola behind it. It hold a white (silver) banner with the red cross on it, and stood next to a yellow (golden) chalice, to which, it was bleeding blood from its chest. The top central field consisted of white and red chessboard, with the head of a black aurochs with a yellow (golden) crown, and a yellow (golden) ring in its nose. The top right field featured a background divided vertically onto two identical stripes, yellow and red. It depicted a left-facing half of a white lion, joined with a right-facing half of a white (silver) eagle, both wearing together a yellow (golden) crown on their head. The central left field featured a red background with a white (silver) eagle, with raised wings, its head turned left, and a yellow (golden) legs. The central right field featured a yellow (golden) background, with a left-facing half of a black lion, joined with a right-facing half of a white (silver) eagle, both wearing together a yellow (golden) crown on their heads. The bottom left field featured a background divided vertically onto two identical stripes, white and red. It depicted a left-facing half of a red lion, joined with a right-facing half of a white (silver) eagle, both wearing together a yellow (golden) crown on their heads. The bottom right field featured a red background, with a red eagle with raised wings, its head turned left, and a yellow (golden) legs, and a yellow (golden) letter R in a ring, placed on its chest. The four charges represented a historical subdivisions of Poland, that used to exist within the borders of the voivodeship. Those were from left to right, and from top to bottom: Wieluń Land, Kalisz Voivodeship, Sieradz Voivodeship, Masovian Voivodeship, voivodeships of Brześć Kujawski and Inowrocław, Łęczyca Voivodeship, and Rawa Voivodeship. The coat of arms had been used until 1866.

The coat of arms of the Warsaw Governorate, used from 1869 to 1915.

The new design of the coat of arms had been approved on 25 February 1869, by Alexander II of Russia, the emperor of the Russian Empire. It depicted an orange (golden) sheaf of hay, tied up with an orange band, placed on a blue French style escutcheon. In the middle of the coat of arms was placed horizontally a grey (silver) wavy line. Around the shield, there are yellow (golden) leaves of the oak tree, interspersed with the blue ribbon of the Order of St. Andrew. On the top of the coat of arms, above the escutcheon, there was the yellow (golden) Imperial Crown of Russia. The coat of arms remained in the use until 1915.

=== Second Polish Republic ===
The design of the coat of arms of the Warsaw Voivodeship proposed in 1928.

In 1928, as part of the project to design the coat of arms for the voivodeships of the Second Polish Republic, the design for the coat of arms of the Warsaw Voivodeship had been created. Though planned to be officially approved, it never was, as it was decided to postpone the approval of the subdivision symbols due to the planned administrative reform, that eventually took place in 1938. Eventually, the plans for the establishment of the coat of arms had been stopped by the Invasion of Poland by Nazi Germany, on 1 September 1939, that begun the World War II, and were not picked up back after the end of the conflict. The proposed design featured a white eagle with raised wings and its head turned left. It had a yellow (golden) beak with tongue, and legs. It was placed within a red Iberian style escutcheon, with square top and rounded base.

=== Third Polish Republic ===
The coat of arms of the Masovian Voivodeship, used from 2002 to 2005.

The coat of arms of the Masovian Voivodeship of the Third Polish Republic had been adopted by the Masovian Voivodeship Sejmik, on 3 May 2002. The coat of arms depicted a white (silver) eagle with raised wings, and its head turned left. It had yellow (golden) beak and legs. It was placed within a red Iberian style escutcheon, with square top and rounded base. The design had been based on a 14th-century seal used by Siemowit III, Duke of Masovia. That design of the coat of arms had been criticized by the Heraldic Commission, for not having a significant historical connection to Masovia. Additionally, it was brought to attention that the coat of arms used the similar design of the eagle, to the one used in the coat of arms of the town of Oborniki, Poland. As such, both coat of arms and flag, had been redesigned in 2006. The new versions had been created by graphic designer Andrzej Heidrich, and officially approved on 29 May 2006. The design of the eagle had been changed, to one based on the coat of arms of the Masovian Voivodeship of the Crown of the Kingdom of Poland, used from 1526 to 1795.

== See also ==
- flag of the Masovian Voivodeship
