= Masovian Voivodeship (disambiguation) =

Masovian Voivodeship is a voivodeship of Poland established in 1999.

Masovian Voivodeship may also refer to:

- Masovian Voivodeship (1526–1795), a voivodeship of the Crown of the Kingdom of Poland from 1526 to 1795
- Masovian Voivodeship (1793), an unrealized proposition for the voivodeship of the Polish–Lithuanian Commonwealth, proposed in 1793
- Masovian Voivodeship (1816–1837), a voivodeship of the Congress Poland from 1816 to 1837
