= Masovian Governorate =

1837–1844 unit of Poland

Coordinates: 52°20′54″N 21°06′10″E

Masovian Governorate Мазовецкая губерния
- Governorate of Congress Poland
- 1837–1844
- Coat of arms
- Capital: Warsaw
- History
  - Establishment: 7 March 1837
  - Incorporation into the Warsaw Governorate: 31 December 1844
- Contained within
  - Country: Congress Poland
| Preceded by | Succeeded by |
| Masovian Voivodeship | Warsaw Governorate |

Masovia Governorate (Note: Russian: Мазовецкая губерния, romanized: Mazovetskaya guberniya; Polish: Gubernia mazowiecka) was an administrative-territorial unit (guberniya) of Congress Poland of the Russian Empire, which existed from 1837 to 1844, with its capital in Warsaw.

== History ==
It was established on 7 March 1837, replacing the Masovian Voivodeship, and existed until 31 December 1844, when it was merged with the Kalisz Governorate, forming the Warsaw Governorate on 1 January 1845.
