= 6th Uhlan Regiment (Duchy of Warsaw) =

- 6 Pułk Ułanów
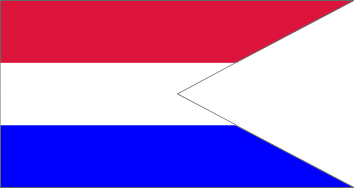
- Active: 1806 - 1813
- Allegiance: Duchy of Warsaw
- Branch: Army
- Type: Uhlan
- Size: 610 soldiers - 1809
- Part of: 3rd Division; Cavalry Division of Antoni Paweł Sułkowski - 1813
- Garrison/HQ: Radziejów
- Engagements: War of the Fourth Coalition; Austro-Polish War; French invasion of Russia; War of the Sixth Coalition

Commanders
- Notable commanders: Wincenty Krasiński; Dominik Dziewanowski; Tadeusz Suchorzewski

6th Uhlan Regiment (Polish:6 Pułk Ułanów) – was an uhlan regiment in the Army of the Duchy of Warsaw.

It was formed in 1806 in Bydgoszcz. At the end of 1809, the regiment was numbered at 610 soldiers.

== Uniform ==
Until 1809, the regiment bore the colours of the 3rd Division. The lapels and collar were white with yellow or gold accents.

However, this was not so obvious, as in a letter dated 6 July 1807, Colonel Dziewanowski asked the Minister of War about the correct colours of his unit's uniform, because General Dąbrowski had decided, 'so that the collars and cuffs were crimson and the lapels white, and in this way he had many uniforms made.' and General Aksamitowski, who was then in charge of 3rd Division. 'he ordered them to make them all white.'

From 1810 onwards the uniform of the regiment was:

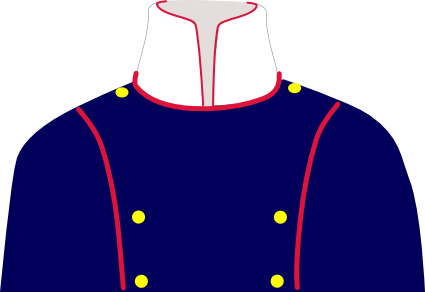
White collar with crimson trim. Navy blue lapels with crimson trim.

Navy blue lapels with crimson piping.

Crimson Lampasse.

== Regiment commanders ==
The commanders of the regiment were:

- Col. Wincenty Krasiński (27 December 1806)
- Col. Dominik Dziewanowski (3 January 1807)
- Col. Michał Pągowski (20 March 1810)
- Col. Tadeusz Suchorzewski (11 October 1812).

== Battles and skirmishes ==
The 6th Uhlan Regiment took part in the War of the Fourth Coalition, Austro-Polish War, French invasion of Russia and War of the Sixth Coalition.

Battles and Skirmishes:

Battles and skirmishes	Date
Tczew	23 February 1807
Gdańsk	26 March 1807
Friedland	14 June 1807
Włodawa	6 May 1809
Zamość	15-20 May 1809
Sandomierz	17-18 May, 15,16 and 26th June 1809
Sobola	27 May 1809
Skierniewice	28 June 1809
Pińczów	9 July 1809
Ostrovno	26 June 1812
Jelnia	5 September 1812
Borodino	7 September 1812
Winkowo	4 October 1812
Neustadt	13 September 1813
Lauterbach	21 September 1813
Zehma	4 October 1813
Leipzig	16 October 1813

== See also ==
- Army of the Duchy of Warsaw
- 3rd Division
