= Order of St. Anne =

Order of St. Anne may refer to:

- Order of St. Anne (Anglican) (OSA), an Anglican religious order
- Order of St. Anne (Chicago), the OSA's Chicago convent
- Order of St. Anna, Russian Imperial order of chivalry established by Karl Friedrich, Duke of Holstein-Gottorp on 14 February 1735
