= Sarbinowo, Gostyń County =

Sarbinowo
- Village
- Location within Poland
- Coordinates: 51°43′29″N 16°53′42″E
- Country: Poland
- Voivodeship: Greater Poland
- County: Gostyń
- Gmina: Poniec
- Population: 257

Sarbinowo [sarbiˈnɔvɔ] is a village in the administrative district of Gmina Poniec, within Gostyń County, Greater Poland Voivodeship, in west-central Poland.
