= Order of St. Anne (Chicago) =

The Chicago Convent of the Order of St. Anne is an autonomous convent of the Anglican Order of St. Anne. It was established at the Anglo-Catholic Church of the Ascension in 1921 in response to a call from the rector and vestry for sisters to do missionary work in the parish. The Sisters work at the Church of the Ascension, and as teachers and counselors. The current Reverend Mother is Sister Judith.
