= Wydawnictwo Uniwersytetu Śląskiego =

Polish university press

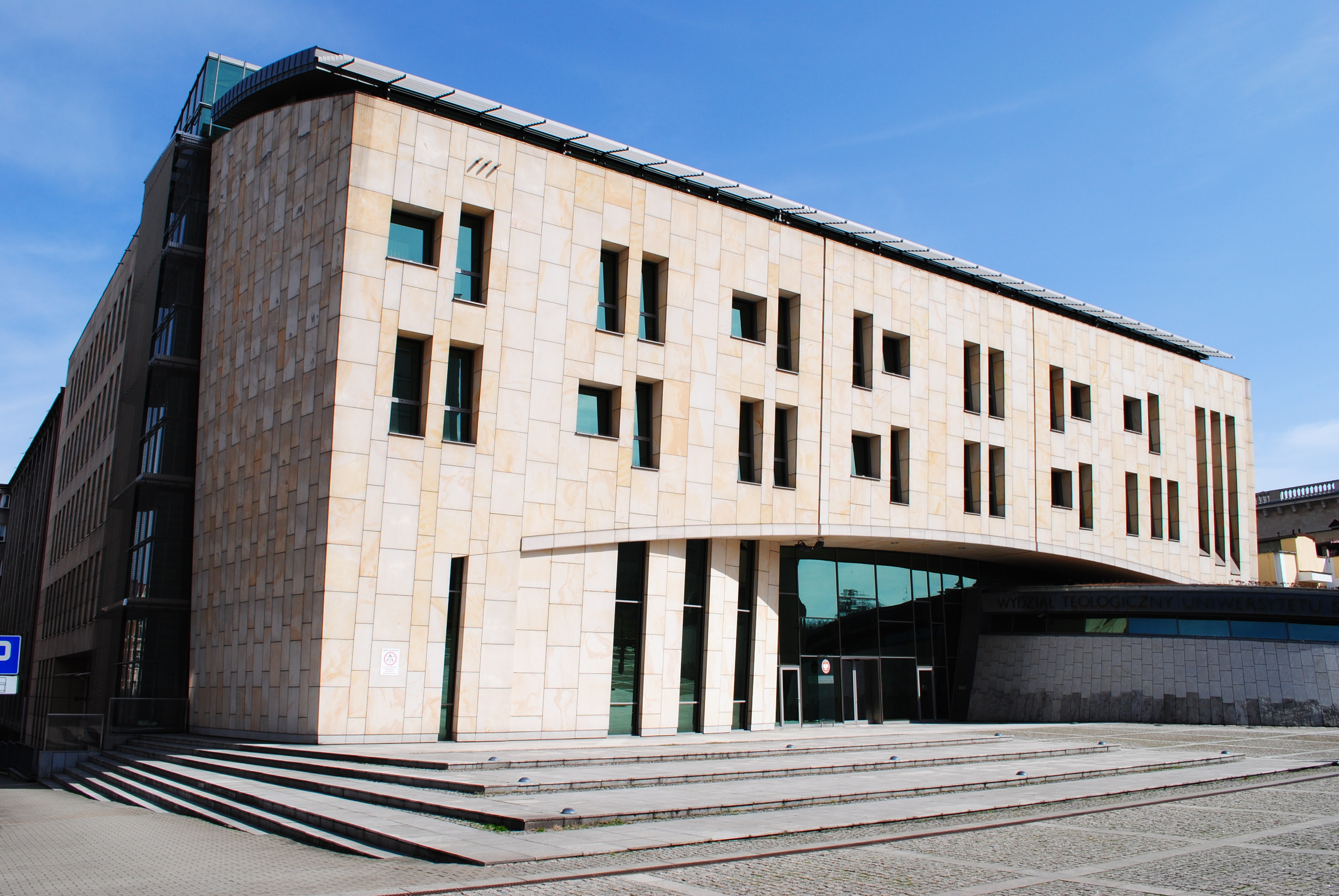
18 Jordana St. in Katowice, seat of University of Silesia Press

University of Silesia Press (Polish: Wydawnictwo Uniwersytetu Śląskiego) was founded in 1968 as the Publishing Department of the University of Silesia, concurrently with the foundation of the University of Silesia in Katowice. On 1 September 1975 it was transformed into a full fledged publishing house.

== Overview ==
University of Silesia Press publishes academic works in all of the disciplines of scholarship and science represented by the academic faculty of the University of Silesia in Katowice. The USP publications include peer-refereed monographs, collective volumes as well as periodicals. Since 2013, all of the USP print publications are simultaneously made available as e-books. The USP book series and periodicals, a significant number of which feature in the evaluation lists of the Polish Ministry of Science and Higher Education and are indexed in Polish and international repositories and databases (such as Central and Eastern European Online Library, CEJSH, BazHum, ERIH PLUS, and others). The USP journals are made available to the reading public as open access periodicals (the so called "gold path") in accordance with the recommendation of the European Commission of 17 July 2012 on access to and preservation of scientific information. A part of the overall body of the USP publications are habilitationschrifts (i.e. "tenure books") as well as doctoral dissertations recommended by the Ph.D. committees at the University of Silesia in Katowice.

A separate field of the USP publishing activity are coursebooks and teaching materials for students, including students of extramural programs and students of Polish as a foreign language.

The publications of the University of Silesia Press have received numerous awards and honorary mentions; among Authors publishing with the USP there are leading experts in a variety of areas of research.

On average, the annual production of the University of Silesia Press amounts to 150-170 titles, with the total volume of ca. 2700 printed sheets per year.

Since February 2017, the University of Silesia Press is led by Beata Klyta, serving as its acting director.
