= Masovian Voivodeship (1816–1837) =

Former subdivision of the Congress Poland

- Voivodeship of the Congress Poland, and the Polish-Lithuanian-Ruthenian Commonwealth
- Coat of arms

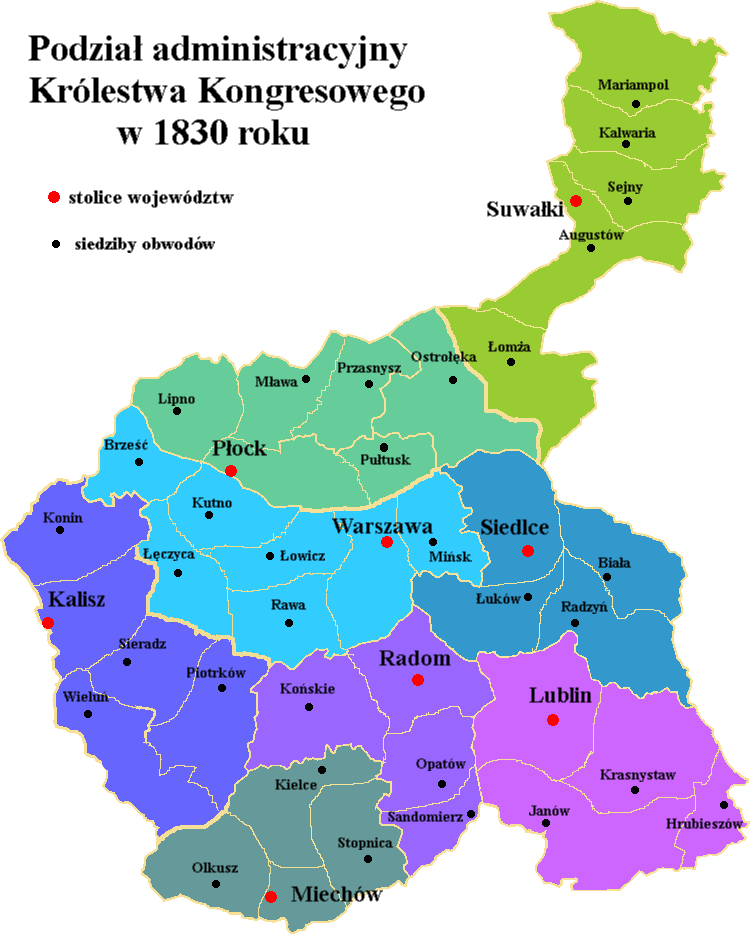
- The administrative subdivisions of the Congress Poland in 1830, including the Masovian Voivodeship.
- Capital: Warsaw
- History
  - Establishment: 16 January 1816
  - Replacement by the Masovia Governorate: 23 February 1837
  - Re-establishment during the January Uprising: 1863
  - Abolishment by the Russian Empire: 1864
- Contained within
  - Country: Congress Poland (1816–1837); Polish-Lithuanian-Ruthenian Commonwealth (1863–1864)
Preceded by
Warsaw Department
Bydgoszcz Department
Warsaw Governorate
Succeeded by
Masovian Governorate
Warsaw Governorate

The Masovian Voivodeship (Note: Polish: Województwo mazowieckie) was a voivodeship of the Congress Poland, that existed from 1816 to 1837. Its capital was Warsaw. It was established on 16 January 1816, from the Warsaw Department and the three counties of the Bydgoszcz Department, and existed until 23 February 1837, when it was replaced by the Masovian Governorate. During the January Uprising, the Polish National Government, announced the re-establishment of the voivodeships with the borders from 1816, reestablishing the administration of the Masovian Voivodeship within the part of Warsaw Governorate. It existed from 1863 to 1864, when it was abolished, and replaced by the Warsaw Governorate.

== Subdivisions ==
- Gostynin District (seat: Kutno)
  - Gostynin County (seat: Gostynin)
  - Orłów County (seat: Kutno)
- Kuyavian District (seat: Włocławek)
  - Brześć Kujawski County (seat: Włocławek)
  - Kowal County (seat: Kowal)
  - Radziejów County (seat: Radziejów)
- Łęczyca District (seat: Łęczyca)
  - Łęczyca County (seat: Łęczyca)
  - Zgierz County (seat: Zgierz)
- Rawa District (seat: Rawa)
  - Brzeziny County (seat: Brzeziny
  - Rawa County (seat: Rawa)
- Sochaczew District (seat: Sochaczew)
  - Sochaczew County (seat: (Sochaczew)
- Stanisławów District (seat: Mińsk Mazowiecki)
  - Siennica County (seat: Siennica)
  - Stanisławów County (seat: Stanisławów)
- Warsaw District
  - Błonie County (seat: Błonie)
  - Czersk County (seat: Czersk)
  - Warsaw County (seat: Warsaw)
