= Warsaw Department =

Administrative area of Napoleonic Poland

Coordinates: 52°14′00″N 21°01′00″E

Warsaw Department Departament Warszawski
- Department of the Duchy of Warsaw
- 1806–1815
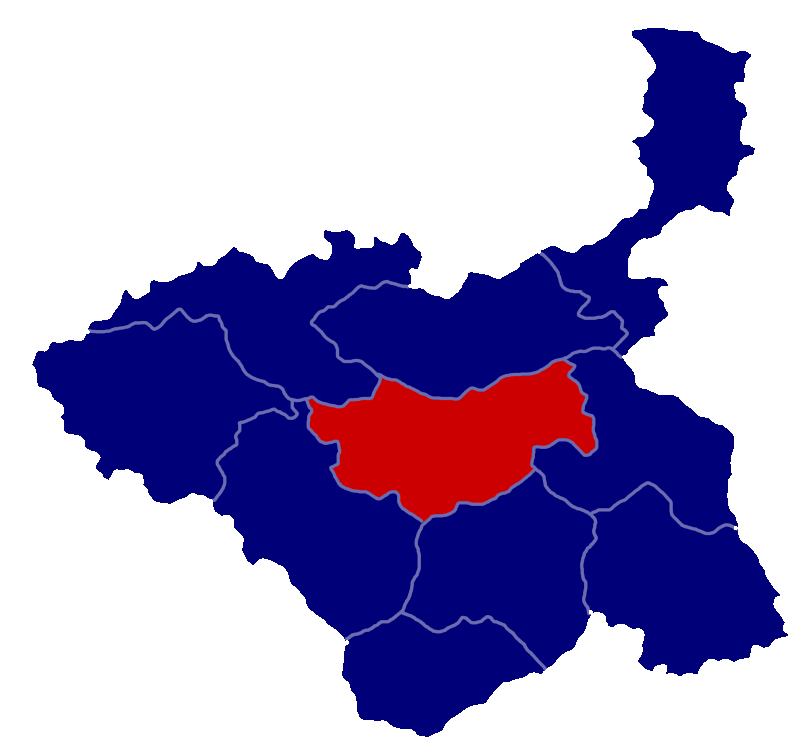
- Administrative division of the Duchy of Warsaw, 1810–1815.
- Capital: Warsaw
- History
  - Established: 1806
  - Disestablished: 1815
Preceded by	Succeeded by
Warschau Department	Masovian Voivodeship (1816–1837)

Warsaw Department (Polish: Departament warszawski) was a unit of administrative division and local government in the Duchy of Warsaw in years 1806–1815. Its capital was Warsaw.

== Administrative division: 10 counties ==
- Błonie County
- Brzezin County
- Czersk County
- Gostynin County
- Łęczyca County
- Orłów County
- Rawa Mazowiecka County
- Sochaczew County
- Warszawa County
- Zgiersk County
- Siennick County (1810)
- Stanisławow County (1810)

In 1815 it was transformed into Masovian Voivodeship.

== Sources ==
- Jacek Arkadiusz Goclon, Polska na królu pruskim zdobyta, Wydawnictwo Uniwersytetu Wrocławskiego, Wrocław 2002.
- Mieczysław Bandurka, Zmiany administracyjne i terytorialne ziem województwa łódzkiego w XIX i XX wieku, NDAP, UW w Łodzi, AP w Łodzi, Łódź 1995.
