= Bydgoszcz Department =

Bydgoszcz Department Departament bydgoski
- Department of the Duchy of Warsaw
- 1806–1815
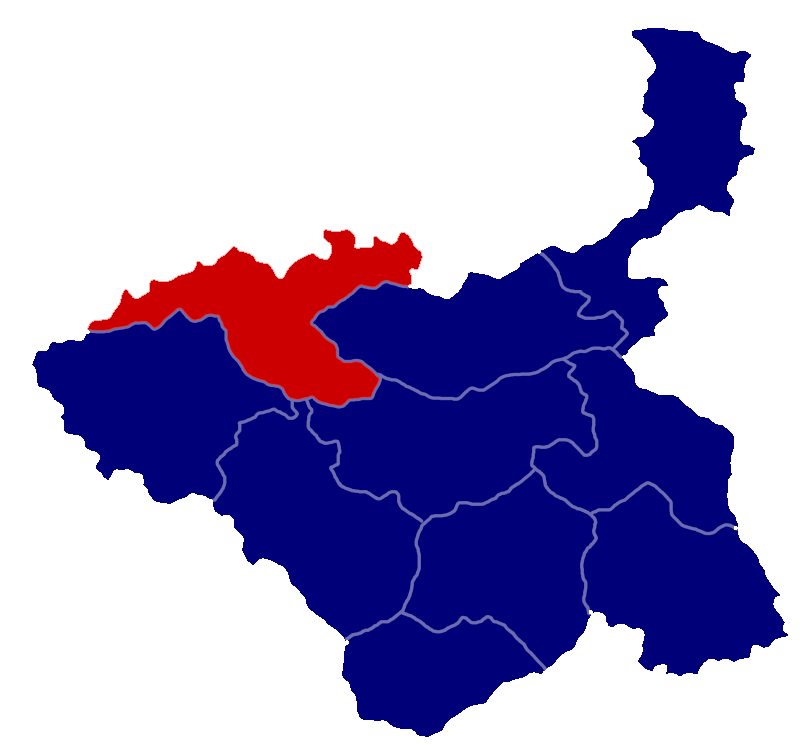
- Administrative division of the Duchy of Warsaw, 1810–1815.
- Capital: Bydgoszcz
- History
  - Established: 1806
  - Disestablished: 1815
Preceded by
| Netze District |
| Posen Department |
| West Prussia |
Succeeded by
| Bromberg (region) |
| Marienwerder (region) |
| Masovian Voivodeship (1816–1837) |

Bydgoszcz Department (Polish: Departament bydgoski) was a unit of administrative division and local government in the Polish Duchy of Warsaw in years 1806 to 1815.

Its capital city was Bydgoszcz.

Following the Decree of 19 December 1807, the area was further divided into ten counties (powiats).

== Sources ==
- Jacek Arkadiusz Goclon, Polska na królu pruskim zdobyta, Wydawnictwo Uniwersytetu Wrocławskiego, Wrocław 2002.
- Mieczysław Bandurka, Zmiany administracyjne i terytorialne ziem województwa łódzkiego w XIX i XX wieku, NDAP, UW w Łodzi, AP w Łodzi, Łódź 1995.
