= Warsaw Governorate =

1844–1915 unit of Poland

Coordinates: 52°14′00″N 21°01′00″E

Warsaw Governorate Варшавская губерния Gubernia warszawska
- Governorate of Congress Poland
- 1844–1915
- Coat of arms

- Location in the Russian Empire
- Capital: Warsaw
- Area
- 17,479.7 km^{2} (6,748.9 sq mi)
- Population
  - 1897: 1,983,689
- History
  - Established: 1844
  - Disestablished: 1915
Preceded by	Succeeded by
Masovian Voivodeship	Government General of Warsaw

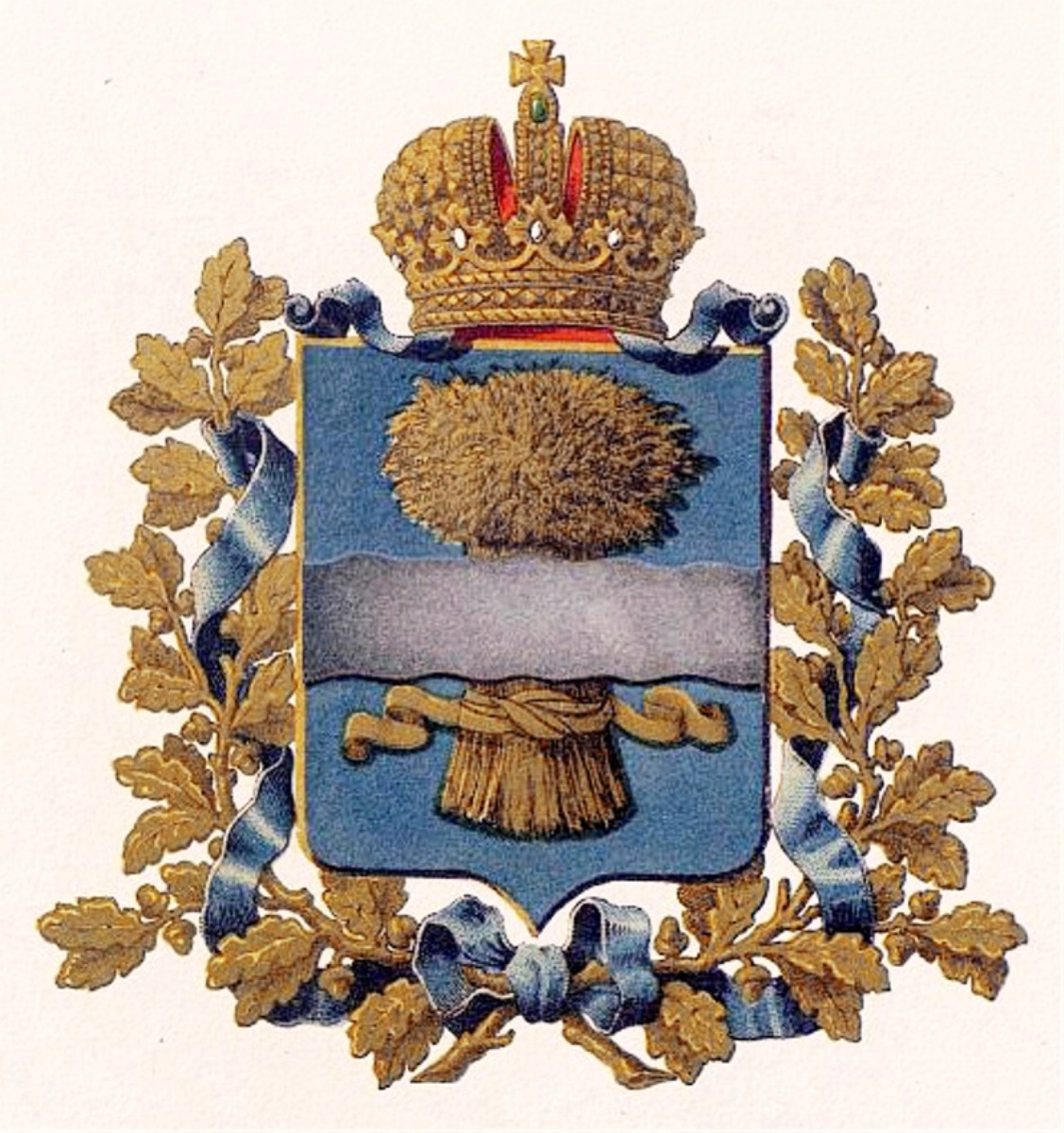
Coat of arms (1880)

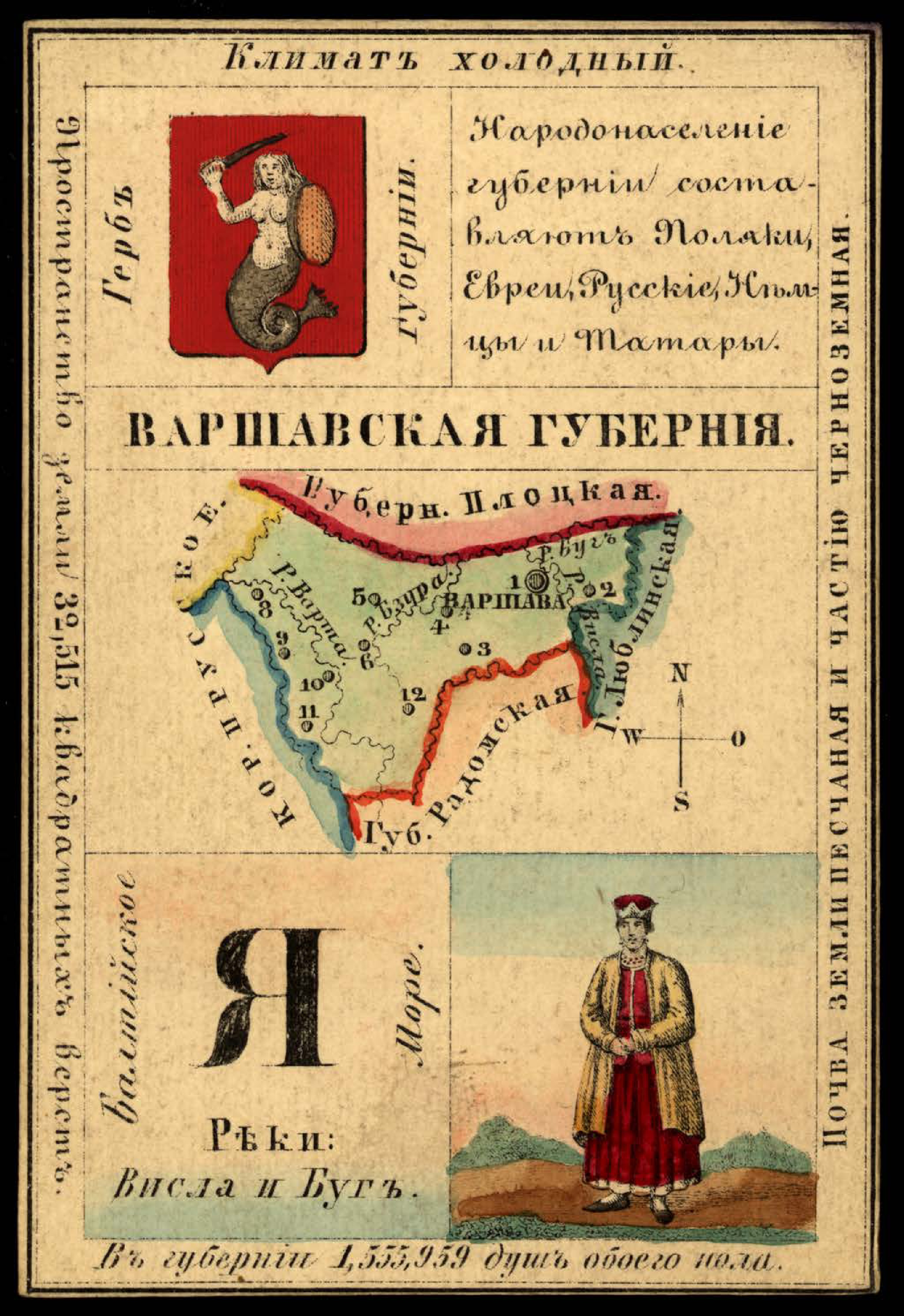
Card (1856) from a set of geographical cards of the Russian Empire, with information on the Warsaw Governorate.

Warsaw Governorate (Note: Russian: Варшавская губерния, romanized: Varshavskaya guberniya; Polish: Gubernia warszawska) was an administrative-territorial unit (guberniya) of Congress Poland of the Russian Empire.

It was created in 1844 from the Masovia and Kalisz Governorates, and had the capital in Warsaw. In 1867 territories of the Warsaw Governorate were divided into three smaller governorates: a smaller Warsaw Governorate, Piotrków Governorate and the recreated Kalisz Governorate.

A small reform in 1893 increased the Warsaw Governorate's size with territories split from Płock and Łomża governorates.

== Language ==
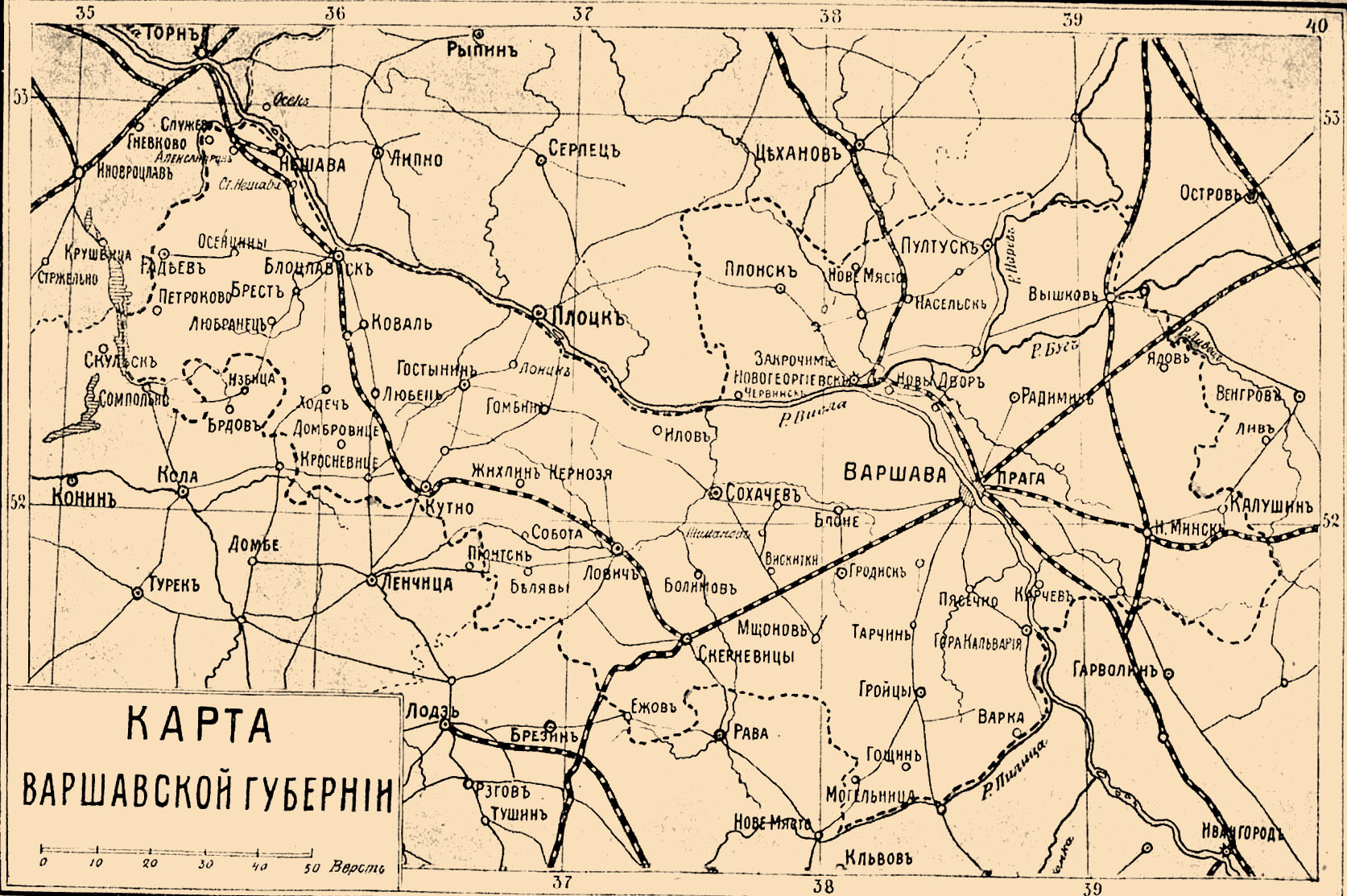
≥ 1906

- By the Imperial census of 1897. In **bold** are languages spoken by more people than the state language.

Language	Number	percentage (%)	males	females
**Polish**	1 420 436	73.52	687 210	733 226
**Yiddish**	317 169	16.41	154 603	162 566
Russian	87 850	4.54	70,898	16,952
German	77 160	3.99	37 984	39 176
Ukrainian	15 930	0.82	15 623	307
Romanian	2 299	>0.01	2 293	6
Latvian	1 759	>0.01	1 738	21
Estonian	1 566	>0.01	1 555	11
Tatar	1 473	>0.01	1 437	36
Belarusian	1 343	>0.01	1 234	109
Other	4 824	0.24	3 289	1 535
Persons who didn't name their native language	54	>0.01	33	21
Total	1 931 867	100	977 948	953 919

== Governors ==
- Evgeni Rozhnov (1863-24.10.1866)
- Baron Nikolai Medem (24.10.1866—01.01.1892)
- Yuliy Andreev (16.01.1892—27.02.1897)
- Dmitri Martynov (03.03.1897—20.01.1907)
- Baron Semyon Korf (20.01.1907—1914)
- Piotr Stremoukhov (1914—1916)
