= Poznań Department =

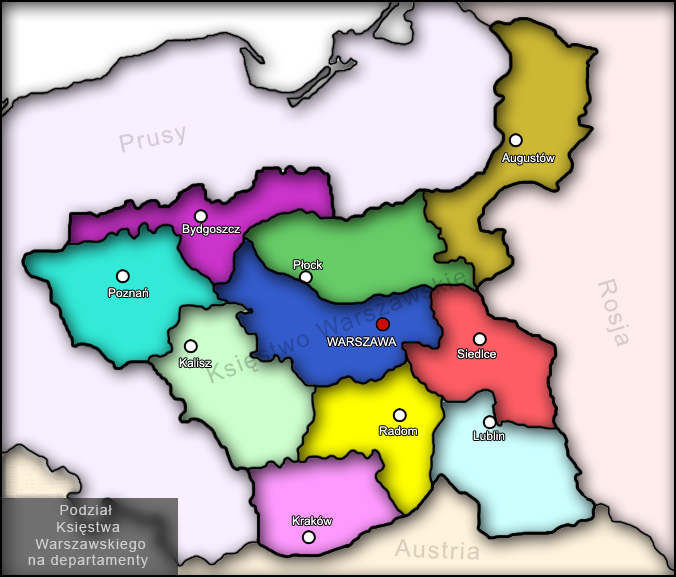
Administrative division of the Duchy of Warsaw, 1810–1815. Poznań Department is light blue in the west.

Poznań Department (Polish: Departament Poznański) was a unit of administrative division and local government in Polish Duchy of Warsaw in years 1806-1815.

Capital city: Poznań

Administrative division: 10 counties.
