= Siege of Danzig (1807) =

1807 Siege during the War of the Fourth Coalition

- Part of the War of the Fourth Coalition
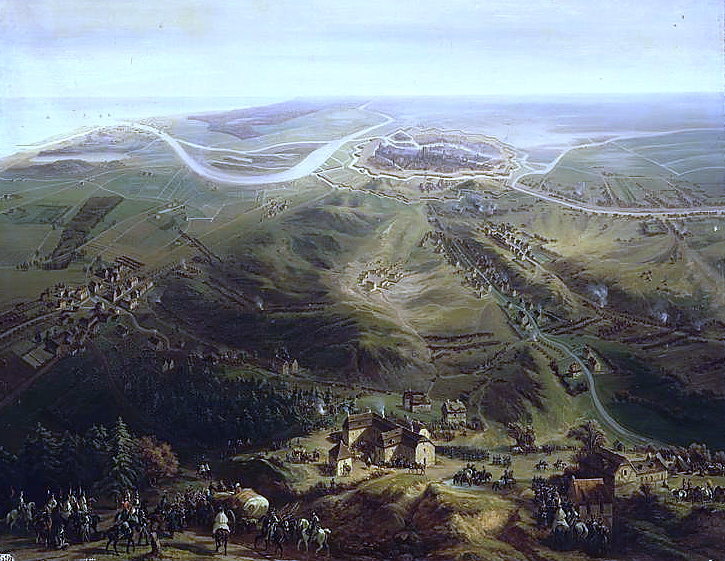
- "Panoramic view of the siege of Danzig by French forces in 1807" painting by Jean-Antoine-Siméon Fort
Date	19 March – 24 May 1807
Location	Danzig, Prussia (present-day Gdańsk, Poland) 54°22′00″N 18°38′00″E
Result	French-allied victory

Belligerents
(First French Empire) French Empire (Duchy of Warsaw) Polish Legions; Kingdom of Italy; Kingdom of Saxony (Grand Duchy of Baden) Duchy of Baden	Kingdom of Prussia; Russian Empire (United Kingdom of Great Britain and Ireland) United Kingdom (naval)

Commanders and leaders
(First French Empire) François Joseph Lefebvre (Duchy of Warsaw) Jan Henryk Dąbrowski	(Kingdom of Prussia) Friedrich Kalckreuth (Russian Empire) Nikolay Kamensky

Strength
39,000; 100 heavy guns & mortars	16,000 (siege); 8,000 Russians (reinforcements)

Casualties and losses
6,000 (siege) 400 (relief attempt)	10,000 (siege) 1,500 (relief attempt)

War of the Fourth Coalition
⬤ current battle
⬤ Napoleon not in command
⬤ Napoleon in command

The siege of Danzig (19 March – 24 May 1807) was the French encirclement and capture of Danzig during the War of the Fourth Coalition. On 19 March 1807, around 27,000 French troops under Marshal Lefebvre besieged around 14,400 Prussian troops under Marshal Kalckreuth garrisoning the city of Danzig.

== Importance of Danzig ==
Danzig held an important strategic position. As well as being an important heavily fortified port with 60,000 inhabitants at the mouth of the river Vistula, it was a direct threat to the French left, as it lay within Prussian lands but to the rear of the French army as it advanced eastward. It was also a potential dropping off point for allied troops which could threaten the French army by opening another front to their rear. Danzig was also difficult to attack, only being accessible from the west, while all other directions were covered either by the Vistula to the north or wetlands to the south and east. Furthermore, it had precious resources (such as powder, grain, eau de vie, etc.) of great interest to the Grande Armée, which was planning a substantial campaign in the east. In a letter dated 18 February 1807, Napoleon noted to Marshal Lefebvre:

Your glory is linked to the taking of Danzig: you must go there.

== Order of battle ==
The task of taking the city was in mid-February given to Marshal Lefebvre and his 10th Corps. The marshal was aided by generals Chasseloup-Laubat, who commanded the engineering works, and Baston de Lariboisière, who commanded the artillery. Together they were the two best specialists in their respective fields in the French army. General Drouet was the chief of staff. The 10th corps comprised two Polish divisions under General Jan Henryk Dąbrowski, one Saxon corps, one contingent from Baden, two Italian divisions and about 10,000 French troops, in total about 45,000 men. Inside Danzig stood 14,400 men under the Prussian commander General Count Friedrich Adolf von Kalkreuth. Napoleon was however to describe these men as ‘canaille' (rabble).

== Encirclement ==
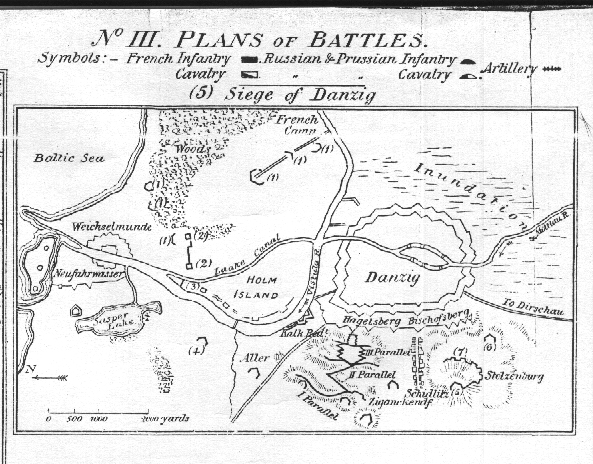
Plan of the siege of Danzig

On 20 March, following Napoleon's orders to encircle the city, French General Schramm led 2,000 troops to the north bank of the Vistula beyond the outlying Weichselmunde fort (Wisłoujście Fortress), occupying a position directly to the north of the city. On 2 April the ground had thawed enough to be able to begin digging siege trenches, a second trench was begun on 8 April and completed on 15 April and a third was finished on 25 April. With the fall of the Silesian fortress of Schweidnitz to Vandamme on 11 April, the large siege guns there were transferred to Danzig, arriving on 21 April.

== Attempts to relieve the city ==
On the 23 March the French batteries opened fire. Russian forces made an attempt between 10–15 May to bring 7,000 reinforcements to the city, led by General Kamensky, ferried in 57 transports under the escort of the British sloop of war Falcon and a Swedish ship of the line. Owing to the absence of the Swedish vessel (bearing 1,200 troops), Kamensky was delayed in his operations. This allowed Lefebvre time to reinforce his positions, and the outnumbered Russian troops were beaten back with a loss of 1,500 men killed and wounded. A further attempt by the British 18-gun praam Dauntless to bring a badly needed 150 barrels of gunpowder via the river failed. Dauntless ran aground near a battery, which bombarded her until grenadier guards from Paris were able to capture her.

== Siege continues ==
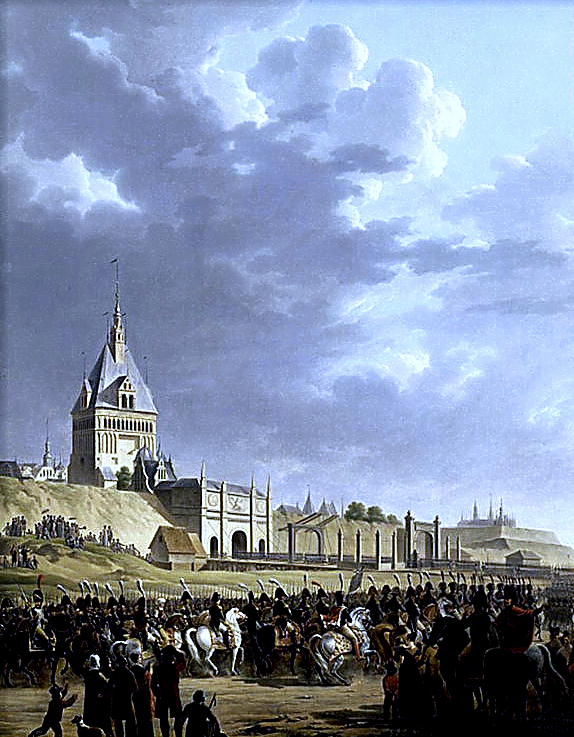
Entry of Napoleon and the French Army in Danzig 1807.

After these failed attempts to relieve the city, the siege and mining continued. On 21 May Marshal Mortier's corps arrived, making it possible to storm the Hagelsberg. Seeing that he could no longer hold out, Kalkreuth sued Lefebvre for peace, requesting the same capitulation terms given by the Prussians to the French in Mainz in 1793. The terms were finally agreed (which had already been agreed in advance with Napoleon) were that the garrison could march out with all the honours of war, with drums beating, matches lighted, and standards flying. The terms were generous because Napoleon was eager to put an end to the siege since the summer (and the fighting season) was approaching and he needed to remove the threat to his rear and to reposition the troops elsewhere.

== Surrender and aftermath ==
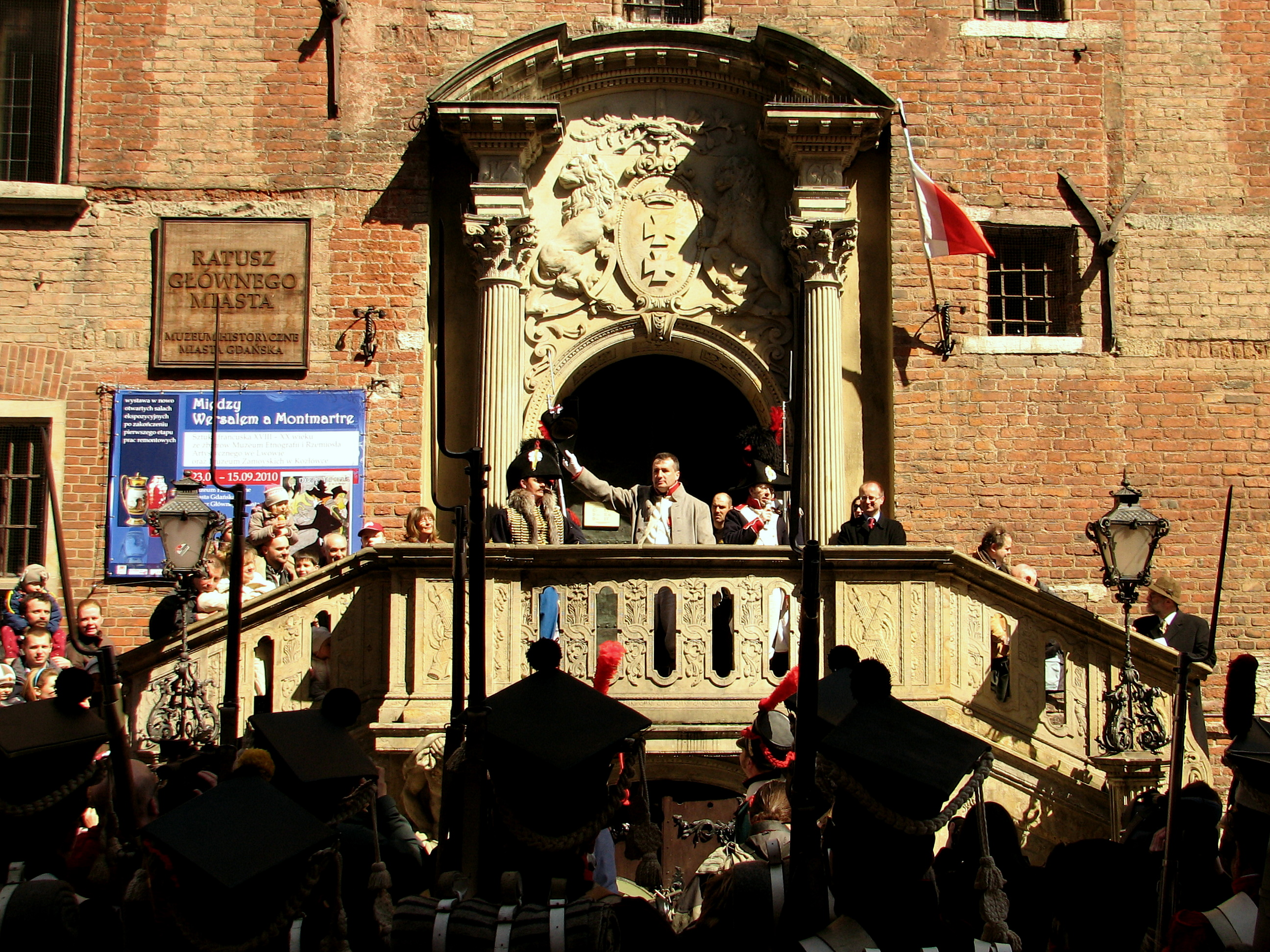
Reenactment of the entry of Napoleon to Danzig after the siege.

Danzig capitulated on 24 May 1807. Napoleon then ordered the siege of the nearby Weichselmünde fort, but Kamensky had fled with his troops, and the garrison capitulated shortly afterwards. The battle cost the French 6,000 killed and wounded, while the Prussians lost 3,000 killed, wounded and sick, and the Russians 1,500. In recompense for Lefebvre's services, Napoléon granted him the title Duc de Dantzig in a letter to the Senate dated 28 May, but he did not inform him directly, merely noting to the marshal on 29 May,

I am...very satisfied with your services, and I have already given proof of this, which you will discover when you read the latest news from Paris and which will leave you in no doubt as to my opinion of you.

On 9 September 1807, Napoleon established the Free City of Danzig, as a semi-independent state. This territory was carved from lands that comprised part of the Kingdom of Prussia, consisting of the city of Danzig (now known as Gdańsk) along with its rural possessions on the mouth of Vistula, together with the Hel Peninsula and the southern half of the Vistula Spit. From late January to 29 November 1813, Russian forces laid siege to the city, and the French occupying forces withdrew on 2 January 1814.

== Bibliographie ==
- Clodfelter, M. (2017). Warfare and Armed Conflicts: A Statistical Encyclopedia of Casualty and Other Figures, 1492-2015 (4th ed.). Jefferson, North Carolina: McFarland. ISBN 978-0-7864-7470-7.
- David G. Chandler (1966). The Campaigns of Napoleon. New York: Scribner. ISBN 0-02-523660-1.
- Alexander Mikaberidze (2020). The Napoleonic Wars A Global History. Oxford: Oxford University Press. ISBN 978-0-19-995106-2.
- McLynn, Frank (1997). Napoleon : a biography. London: Jonathan Cape. ISBN 0224040723.
- Loew, Peter Oliver (2024). Gdańsk : portrait of a city. New York: Oxford University Press. ISBN 9780197603864.

Preceded by Siege of Kolberg (1807)	Napoleonic Wars; Siege of Danzig (1807)	Succeeded by Great Sortie of Stralsund
