= Coat of arms of Podlaskie Voivodeship =

Polish coat of arms

- Armiger: Podlaskie Voivodeship
- Adopted: 19 February 2001 (current version)
- Shield: Red Iberian style escutcheon

The coat of arms that serves as the symbol of Podlaskie Voivodeship, Poland is divided into two horizontal red fields. The top field depicts a white eagle, and a bottom field, a knight in a white (silver) armor, sitting on a white (silver) horse with a blue saddle and shabrack, and yellow (golden) harness, standing on its back hoofs. The knight has a blue shield with a yellow (golden) cross of Lorraine on it, put on his left arm, and hold a sword in his right hand. The current design of the coat of arms was designed by Tadeusz Gajl, and adopted in 2001.

== Design ==
The coat of arms consists of a red Iberian style escutcheon, with square top and round bottom, that is divided horizontally into two fields. The top field depicts a white eagle with yellow (golden) legs, beak, and a crown on its head that is turned left, a red tongue, and risen wings. The bottom field depicts a knight in a white (silver) armor, sitting on a white (silver) horse with a blue saddle and shabrack, and yellow (golden) harness, standing on its back hoofs. The knight has a blue shield with a yellow (golden) cross of Lorraine on it, put on his left arm, and hold a sword in his right hand. The coat of arms symbolizes the historical control of the region by the Polish–Lithuanian Commonwealth, with the eagle being symbol of Poland and knight on the horse of Lithuania.

== History ==
=== Kingdom of Poland ===
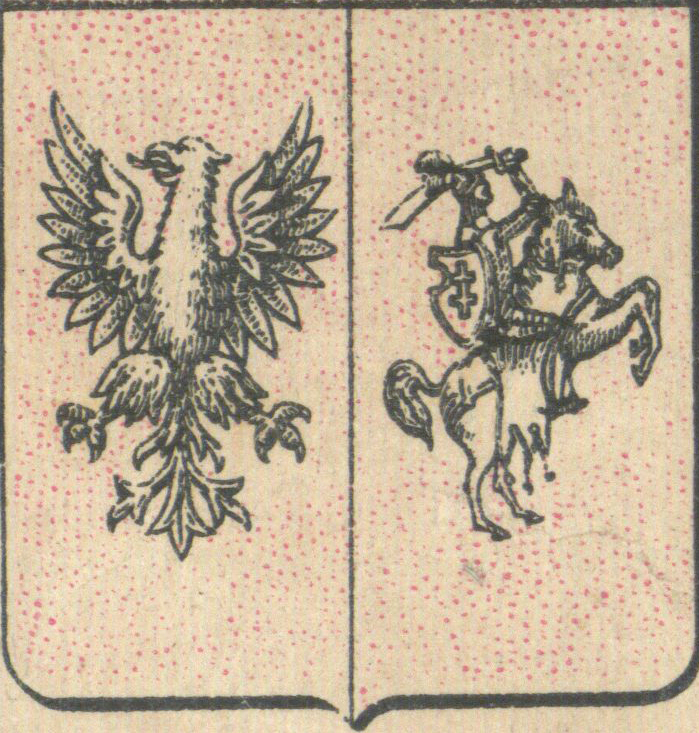
The illustration of the coat of arms of the Podlaskie Voivodeship of the Crown of the Kingdom of Poland, that existed from 1513 to 1795.

The design of the coat of arms of Podlaskie Voivodeship of the Crown of the Kingdom of Poland, that existed from 1513 to 1795, consisted of a red escutcheon divided into two vertical halves. The left half depicted a white eagle with yellow (golden) legs, with risen wings. The right half depicted a knight in a white (silver) armor, sitting on a white (silver) horse with a blue saddle and shabrack, standing on its back hoofs. The knight has a blue shield with a yellow (golden) cross of Lorraine on it, put on his left arm, and hold a sword in his right hand. The coat of arms symbolized the control of the Polish–Lithuanian Commonwealth over the region, with the eagle being symbol of the Crown of the Kingdom of Poland and knight on the horse, the Grand Duchy of Lithuania.

=== Congress Poland ===
The coat of arms of the Podlaskie Voivodeship (1816–1837), and later, the Podlachian Governorate, used until 1844.

The Podlaskie Voivodeship of Congress Poland was established on 16 January 1816. Its coat of arms was divided vertically into two fields. The left half depicted a white eagle with yellow (golden) legs, with risen wings. The right half depicted a knight in a white (silver) armor, sitting on a white (silver) horse with a blue saddle and shabrack, standing on its back hoofs. The knight has a blue shield with a yellow (golden) cross of Lorraine on it, put on his left arm, and hold a sword in his right hand. The voivodeship existed until 23 lutego 1837, when it was replaced by the Podlachian Governorate, which continued using said coat of arms. It ceased to exist in 1844, when it was incorporated into the Lublin Governorate.

The coat of arms of the Lublin Governorate, used from 1845 to 1866.

Following the merge of the two governorates, the Lublin Governorate began using a new coat of arms design which combined the symbols of the former governorates. It was divided into four fields, two on top, and two on bottom. The top fields referred to the former coat of arms of the Lublin Governorate. The top left field depicted a white (silver) male jumping cervus (deer), with a yellow (golden) crown on its neck, placed on a red background. The top right field depicted a white (silver) bear and a tree trees growing on a green grass, placed on a green background. The bear stood behind the middle tree. The bottom fields referred to the former coat of arms of the Podlachian Governorate. The bottom left field depicted a white eagle with yellow (golden) legs, rising its wings, placed on a red background. The bottom right field depicted a knight in a white (silver) armor, sitting on a white (silver) horse with a blue saddle and shabrack, standing on its back hoofs. The knight has a blue shield with a yellow (golden) cross of Lorraine on it, put on his left arm, and hold a sword in his right hand. They are placed on a red background. The coat of arms was approved by the viceroy of Poland, Ivan Paskevich, on 5 October 1845, and later, by the tsar or Russia, Nicholas I, on 26 May 1849. It remained in use until 1866.

The coat of arms of the Siedlce Governorate, used from 1869 to 1912.

In 1867, from the portion of the Lublin Governorate had been formed the Siedlce Governorate, within the borders of the former Podlachian Governorate. Its coat of arms had been approved on 25 February 1869. The coat of arms depicted a red deer with yellow (golden) antlers, hoofs, eyes and a tongue. It was placed on a white French-style escutcheon with a pattern of green oak leaves scattered on a shield. Around the shield, there were yellow (golden) leaves of the oak tree, interspersed with the blue ribbon of the Order of St. Andrew. On the top of the coat of arms, above the escutcheon, there was the yellow (golden) Imperial Crown of Russia. The coat of arms was used until 1912, when the governorate ceased to exist.

=== Third Republic of Poland ===
The Podlaskie Voivodeship of Poland was established on 1 January 1999. Its coat of arms had been designed by Tadeusz Gajl, and based on the historical coat of arms. It was adopted by the Podlaskie Voivodeship Sejmik on 19 February 2001.

== See also ==
- Flag of Podlaskie Voivodeship
- Coat of arms of Augustów Governorate
