= Nikolai Ivanenko =

Russian imperial official, Governor of Kielce Governorate

Nikolai Fedorovich Ivanenko
- Николай Фёдорович Иваненко (Russian)
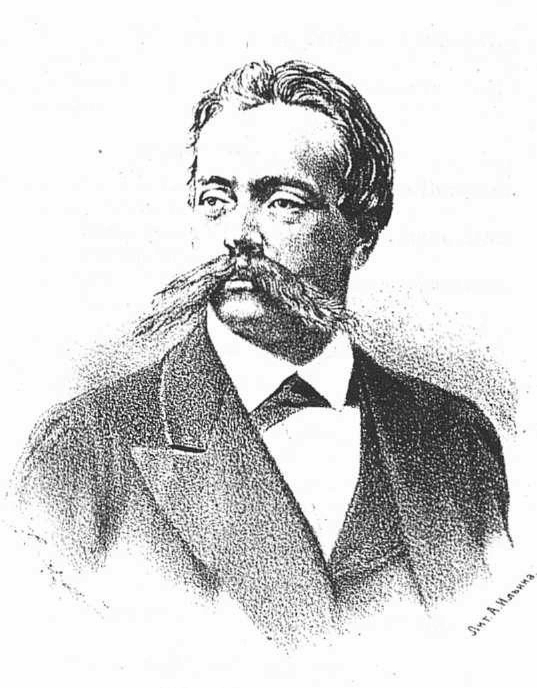

Governor of Kielce Governorate
- In office 17 July 1884 – 14 May 1897
- Preceded by: Alexander Leshchov
- Succeeded by: Yevgeny Shchyrovsky

Vice-Governor of Siedlce Governorate
- In office 3 May 1878 – 5 July 1884
- Preceded by: Alexander Pietrov
- Succeeded by: Mikhail Maylevsky

Personal details
- Born: c. 1827
- Died: After 1910
- Awards: Order of Saint Stanislaus 1st class (Russia); Order of Saint Anna 1st class (Russia); Order of Saint Vladimir 2nd class (Russia); Order of Prince Danilo I (Montenegro); Medal For the Suppression of the Polish Uprising

Nikolai Fedorovich Ivanenko (Russian: Николай Фёдорович Иваненко; c. 1827 – after 1910) was a Russian imperial official who served as Governor of the Kielce Governorate and Vice-Governor of the Siedlce Governorate.

== Biography ==
Nikolai Fedorovich Ivanenko was born around 1827. His family most likely belonged to the nobility of Poltava Governorate. They owned two estates there: one in Piryatinsky Uyezd near the village of Popovka, and another in Pereyaslavsky Uyezd near the villages of Aleksandrowskie, Stara, and Rogozov.

On 27 August 1853 Ivanenko enrolled in the law faculty of the Imperial University of Kharkiv. He did not obtain an academic degree, leaving the university in May of the following year.

Ivanenko began his civil service career in his native Poltava Governorate. On 10 December 1857 he became director of the provincial branch of the Prison Welfare Committee. A week later, on 17 December, he was appointed clerk in the office of the marshal of the nobility in Pereyaslavsky Uyezd. After five years, on 2 November 1862, he became a candidate for judicial office in the same uyezd. His first Table of Ranks grade – Collegiate Registrar (Class XIV) – was granted on 28 January 1860. He had to wait until 1863 for the next promotion to Provincial Secretary (Class XII).

In 1864 Ivanenko was transferred to Congress Poland and assigned to the Lublin Commission for Peasant Affairs. For over 10 years he served as Peasant Affairs Commissioner in Biłgoraj Uyezd (acting from 9 September, officially confirmed 28 November), and from 28 August 1865 as an employee of the Ministry of Justice. In 1876 he chaired three meetings of justices of the peace: 29 March in the 2nd district of Suwałki Governorate, 13 July in Pułtusk (2nd district of Łomża Governorate), and 3 December in the 1st district of Lublin Governorate. During this period he received regular promotions for length of service, although the first – to Titular Councillor (Class IX) on 27 March 1866 – was officially for distinguished service. He became Collegiate Assessor (Class VIII) on 17 October 1868, Court Councillor (Class VII) on 20 October 1871, and Collegiate Councillor (Class VI) on 30 October 1874.

On 21 April 1878 Ivanenko succeeded Alexander Pietrov as Vice-Governor of Siedlce Governorate. He received the statutory Class V rank of State Councillor on 12 May 1879, one year after taking office. (Note: The regulations allowed, in exceptional circumstances, appointment to a post up to two grades higher than the official's current rank (Górak, Kozłowski & Latawiec (2015, pp. 37–38)).) He was promoted to Actual State Councillor (Class IV) for distinguished service on 12 April 1881. He held the vice-governorship until 5 July 1884, when he was replaced by Mikhail Maylevsky.

From Siedlce Governorate Ivanenko was transferred to Kielce, where he replaced Alexander Leshchov as governor. His relations with Vice-Governor Boris Ozierov were extremely poor, leading to the latter's dismissal. He served in the governorate branch of the Russian Charity Society (member from 1885, chairman from 17 May 1889). During his tenure he also participated in higher-level administrative work. On 17 April 1887 he joined the commission drafting fire-insurance legislation for Congress Poland, and in 1896, together with two Ministry of Finance officials, adapted the 1894 state alcohol monopoly law to local conditions. From 12 April 1881 he held the title of Privy Councillor (Class III).

His attempts in 1894 to obtain the position of head of the Warsaw Governor-General's Chancellery were unsuccessful. His further career was hindered by the change of Governor-General to Alexander Imeretinsky, who carried out numerous personnel changes and disapproved of Ivanenko's anti-Polish stance. Officially, Ivanenko resigned on 2 May 1897 citing poor health. He retained the right to wear the uniform, and was succeeded by Yevgeny Shchyrovsky.

Ivanenko was still alive in 1910. The exact date of his death is unknown.

== Family ==
Nikolai Ivanenko was the son of Fedor Grigorievich Ivanenko (1799 – c. 1850), a staff captain and marshal of the nobility of Piryatinsky and Pereyaslavsky Uyezds in Poltava Governorate. His mother's name was Anna. He had an elder brother Grigory (born 1823) and two younger sisters – Yelizaveta (born 1831) and Alexandra (born 1832).

In 1897 he was still unmarried; it is unknown whether he ever married.

== Property ==
For 19 years Nikolai Fedorovich owned the Podolszynka Plebańska folwark in Biłgoraj Uyezd, Lublin Governorate, near the village of Kretów. He purchased it on 21 October 1874 for 9,310 rubles during the liquidation of Catholic Church properties and sold it on 31 October 1893.

In addition to his salary, Ivanenko received three 15% supplements for every five years of service in Congress Poland (granted 1 January 1876, 18 August 1883, and 1 April 1888). After retirement he received a pension of 3,000 rubles, approved by the Committee of Ministers on 11 October 1897.

== Honours ==
Nikolai Ivanenko received the following Russian orders:

- Order of Saint Stanislaus
  - 2nd class – 10 May 1868
  - 2nd class with crown – 25 September 1870
  - 1st class – 30 August 1886
- Order of Saint Anna
  - 2nd class – 17 April 1878
  - 1st class – 30 August 1889
- Order of Saint Vladimir
  - 4th class – 19 June 1875
  - 3rd class – 15 May 1883
  - 2nd class – 6 December 1895

Foreign order:

- Order of Prince Danilo I (Montenegro), 3rd class – 21 May 1883

Medals:

- Dark bronze Medal For the Suppression of the Polish Uprising – 18 May 1865
- Silver Medal For Work on the Implementation of the Enfranchisement Reform in the Kingdom of Poland – 19 February 1866
- Silver Medal In Memory of the Reign of Emperor Alexander III – 20 January 1897
- Dark bronze Medal for Work on the First General Census – 24 February 1897

== Bibliography ==
- Górak, Artur; Kozłowski, Jan; Latawiec, Krzysztof (2015). Słownik biograficzny gubernatorów i wicegubernatorów w Królestwie Polskim (1867–1918) [Biographical Dictionary of Governors and Vice-Governors in the Kingdom of Poland (1867–1918)] (in Polish). Lublin: Maria Curie-Skłodowska University Press. ISBN 978-83-7784-553-0.
