= List of municipal flags in the Podlaskie Voivodeship =

The flag of the Podlaskie Voivodeship

The following list includes flags of municipalities (gminas) in the Podlaskie Voivodeship, Poland.

According to the definition, a flag is a sheet of fabric of a specific shape, colour and meaning, attached to a spar or mast. It may also include the coat of arms or emblem of the administrative unit concerned. In Poland, territorial units (municipal, city and county councils) may establish flags in accordance with the Act of 21 December 1978 on badges and uniforms. In its original version, it only allowed territorial units to establish coats of arms. Despite that many cities and municipalities adopted resolutions and used a flag as their symbol. It was not until the Act of 29 December 1998 amending certain acts in connection with the implementation of the state system reform that the right of voivodeships, counties and municipalities to establish this symbol of a territorial unit was officially confirmed.

In 2024, 60 out of 118 municipalities in Podlaskie Voivodeship had their own flag. This type of symbol, since 2002, has been established by the voivodeship itself.

== List of municipal flags ==
=== Augustów County ===
Municipality	Flag	Description
Gmina Bargłów Kościelny		The municipality's flag was established on 31 December 1997. It is a rectangular flag, divided into three equal horizontal stripes: two yellow and blue.
Gmina Płaska		The municipal flag was established by Resolution No. VI/35/07 of 28 April 2007. It is a rectangular flag, green in colour, in the central part of the flag the municipal coat of arms is placed.

=== City of Białystok ===
Flag	Description
	The city's flag, designed by Tadeusz Gajl, was established on 27 May 1996. It is a rectangular flag with proportions of 5:8, divided into three equal horizontal stripes: white, yellow and red. In the central part of the flag the cities coat of arms is placed.

=== Białystok County ===
Municipality	Flag	Description
City and gmina Choroszcz		The municipality's flag is a rectangular flag with proportions of 3:4, divided into four equal vertical stripes: yellow, grey-violet, white and red.
Gmina Juchnowiec Kościelny		The municipal flag, designed by Tadeusz Gajl, was established by Resolution No. XXV/286/2013 of 18 April 2013. It is a rectangular flag with proportions of 5:8 in red in colour, in the central part of the flag the municipal coat of arms is placed.
City and gmina Łapy		The municipality's flag was established on 1 December 1992. It is a rectangular flag with proportions of 5:8, divided into three equal horizontal stripes: white, yellow and blue.
Gmina Poświętne		The municipality's flag, designed by Robert Szydlik, was established by Resolution No. XXVIII/190/14 of 29 April 2014. It is a rectangular flag with proportions of 5:8 in colour, in the central part of the flag the municipal coat of arms is placed.
City and gmina Supraśl		The flag of the municipality, designed by Grzegorz Łoś, is a rectangular flag with proportions 5:8 red in colour, divided by a white stripe running from the bottom left corner to the upper right corner. In the central part of the flag the municipal coat of arms is placed.
Gmina Turośń Kościelna		The municipal flag was established by Resolution No. XI/63/99 of 1 September 1999. It is a rectangular flag with proportions of 5:8, divided into three vertical stripes: two red and one yellow in the ratio of 1:3:1. In the central part of the flag the municipal coat of arms is placed.
City and gmina Tykocin		The municipality's flag was established by Resolution No. XXI/128/2020 of 6 March 2020. It is a rectangular flag with proportions of 5:8, divided into three triangles: two gold and one red. On the left side of the red triangle the municipal coat of arms is placed.
City and gmina Wasilków		The flag of the municipality was established by Resolution No. XXXVI/293/17 of 28 September 2017. It is a rectangular flag with proportions of 5:8, divided into three horizontal stripes: two yellow and a black one in the ratio of 2:1:2.
City i gmina Zabłudów		The municipal flag was established by Resolution No. XXX/176/97 of 17 August 1997. It is a rectangular flag, divided into two equal horizontal stripes: red and blue. In the central part of the flag the municipal coat of arms is placed.

=== Bielsk County ===
Municipality	Flag	Description
Gmina Bielsk Podlaski		The flag of the municipality, designed by Dr. Gerard Kucharski, was established by Resolution No. XL/253/2014 of 29 August 2014. It is a rectangular flag with proportions of 5:8, blue in colour, in the central part of the flag the municipal coat of arms is placed.
Gmina Brańsk		The municipal flag is a rectangular flag, divided into three horizontal stripes: white, yellow and red in the ratio of 1:2:1. In the central part flag the municipal coat of arms is placed.
Gmina Orla		The municipal flag was established by Resolution No. XXIV/163/02 of 19 April 2002. It is a rectangular flag, divided into three vertical stripes: two red and one yellow in the ratio 1:2:1. In the central part of the flag the municipal coat of arms is placed.
Gmina Wyszki		The flag of the municipality, designed by Henryk Seroka, was established by Resolution No. XVII/213/17 of 27 June 2017. It is a rectangular flag with proportions of 5:8, blue in colour, in the central part of the flag the municipal coat of arms is placed.

=== Hajnówka County ===
Municipality	Flag	Description
Gmina Białowieża		The municipal flag was established by Resolution No. X/62/11 of 25 November 2011. It is a rectangular flag with proportions of 5:8, divided into three horizontal stripes: white, green and yellow in the ratio of 2:1:2.
Gmina Hajnówka		The municipality's flag was established by Resolution No. XXV/135/13 of 4 June 2013. It is a rectangular flag with proportions of 5:8, divided into three horizontal stripes: two green and one white in the ratio of 1:3:1. In the central part of the flag the municipal coat of arms is placed.
Gmina Narew		The municipal flag was established by Resolution No. XXXVII/217/10 of 14 October 2010. It is a rectangular flag with proportions 5:8, white in colour, in the central part of the flag of the municipal coat of arms is placed.
Gmina Narewka		The municipality's flag was established on 25 April 1996. It is a rectangular flag with proportions of 5:8, divided into three equal horizontal stripes: white, blue and green.

=== Kolno County ===
Municipality	Flag	Description
City of Kolno		The city flag was established by Resolution No. XIX/104/2000 of 28 June 2000. It is a rectangular flag, divided into three horizontal stripes: white, red and yellow in the ratio of 1:2:1. In the central part the flag the city's coat of arms is placed.
Gmina Kolno		The municipal flag was established by Resolution No. XVI/117/08 of 29 May 2008. It is a rectangular flag with proportions of 5:8, divided into three horizontal stripes: red, gold and green in the ratio of 1:3:1. In the central part of the flag the coat of arms is placed.
Gmina Mały Płock		The municipal flag was established by Resolution No. X/39/11 of 28 October 2011. It is a rectangular flag with proportions of 5:8, divided into five horizontal stripes: three red and two white in the ratio of 4:5:2:5:4. On the left side of the flag the municipal coat of arms is placed.
Gmina Turośl		The municipality's flag, designed by Robert Szydlik, was established by Resolution No. XXII/120/13 of 3 December 2013. It is a rectangular flag with proportions of 5:8, green in colour, in the central part of the flag the municipal coat of arms is placed.

=== City of Łomża ===
Flag	Description
	The city flag was established by resolution no 135/XXVI/95 of 20 December 1995. It is a rectangular flag, divided into three triangles: yellow (symbolising the Mazovian sands), blue (symbolising the Narew river) and red (referring to the city walls).

=== Łomża County ===
Municipality	Flag	Description
Gmina Łomża		The current form of the municipality's flag, designed by Robert Szydlik, was established by Resolution No. XXXIII/211/17 of 18 October 2017; the previous version had been in force since 1997. It is a rectangular flag with proportions of 5:8, divided into two horizontal stripes: red and yellow in a ratio of 4:1. On the left side of the flag there is the municipal coat of arms.
Gmina Piątnica		The municipal flag, designed by Robert Szydlik, was established by Resolution No. 17/V/2011 of 30 January 2011. It is a rectangular flag with proportions of 5:8, divided into three horizontal stripes: two green and yellow in the ratio of 1:2:1. In the central part of the flag the municipal coat of arms is placed.
Gmina Wizna		The current version of the municipal flag, designed by Kamil Wójcikowski and Robert Fidura, was established by Resolution No. XXXVII/282/2022 of 31 May 2022. At present, it is a rectangular flag with proportions of 5:8, divided into three vertical stripes: two red and one yellow one with a ratio of 1:6:1. In the central part of the flag the municipal coat of arms is placed.

=== Mońki County ===
Municipality	Flag	Description
City and gmina Goniądz		The municipality's flag was established by Resolution No. XXII/120/13 of 3 December 2013. It is a rectangular piece of cloth flag with proportions of 5:8, yellow in colour, in the central part of the flag the municipal coat of arms is placed.
City and gmina Mońki		The city flag was established by Resolution No. XII/109/95 of 9 November 1995. It is a rectangular flag, divided into two equal horizontal stripes: red and gold.

=== Sejny County ===
Municipality	Flag	Description
Gmina Giby		The municipal flag, designed by Tadeusz Gajl, was established by Resolution No. V/31/11 of 28 March 2011. It is a rectangular flag with proportions of 5:8, green in colour, in the central part of the flag the municipal coat of arms is placed. Underneath the coat of arms is two white wavy lines.
Gmina Krasnopol		The municipal flag was established by Resolution No. XXXII/184/10 of 28 January 2010. It is a rectangular flag with proportions of 5:8, divided crosswise into four fields in the colours white, red (2 fields) and yellow. In the upper left field of the flag is the municipal coat of arms.
City of Sejny		The city flag is a rectangular flag with proportions of 5:8, divided into two equal vertical stripes: a red one with city's coat of arms and a green one, divided by a white wavy stripe.
Gmina Sejny		The municipal flag was established by means of Resolution No. XXXVII/157/05 of 2 September 2005. It is a rectangular flag with proportions of 5:8, divided into three horizontal stripes: two red and one white in the ratio of 1:3:1. In the central part of the flag the municipal coat of arms is placed.

=== Siemiatycze County ===
Municipality	Flag	Description
City and gmina Drohiczyn		The municipal flag was established by Resolution No. XII/91/08 of 14 March 2008. It is a rectangular flag with proportions of 2:3, white in colour, in the central part of the flag the municipal coat of arms is placed.
City of Siemiatycze		The city flag was established by Resolution No. X/67/03 of 27 August 2003. It is a rectangular flag with proportions of 5:8, divided into three equal horizontal stripes: red, yellow and blue. In the central part of the flag the coat of arms of the city.

=== Sokółka County ===
Municipality	Flag	Description
Gmina Janów		Flag of the municipality, by Tadeusz Gajl, is a rectangular flag divided into five horizontal strips: green, yellow, red, yellow and green in the ratio of 3:1:2:1:3.
Gmina Korycin		The municipal flag was established by Resolution No. XIII/68/95 of 11 November 1995. It is a rectangular flag with proportions of 5:8, divided into three equal vertical stripes: two green and a red one. In its central part of the flag there is a white cross.
City and gmina Krynki		The flag of the municipality was established by Resolution No. XVIII/108/2016 of 29 December 2016. It is a rectangular flag with proportions of 5:8, divided into two horizontal stripes: blue and green in the ratio of 19:6. On the left side of the flag is the municipal coat of arms.
City and gmina Sokółka		The municipality's flag, designed by Andrzej Koch, was established in February 1998. It is a rectangular flag, divided into three triangles: one yellow and two red ones.
City and gmina Suchowola		The municipal flag is a rectangular flag with proportions 5:8, divided into two vertical stripes: green and blue with a yellow cross.
Gmina Szudziałowo		The municipal flag was established by Resolution No. XVIII/117/2000 of 28 July 2000. It is a rectangular flag with proportions of 5:8, divided into three vertical stripes: two yellow and a green one in the ratio of 1:3:1. In the central part of the flag the municipal coat of arms.

=== City of Suwałki ===
Flag	Description
	The first version of the city's flag was established by Resolution No. VII/61/2015 of 29 April 2015, while the current one, designed by Kamil Wójcikowski and Robert Fidura, was established by Resolution No. XLIX/641/2022 of 28 September 2022. It is a rectangular flag with proportions of 5:8, divided into two horizontal stripes: green and red in the ratio of 7:1. In the central part of the flag the city's coat of arms is placed.

=== Suwałki County ===
Municipality	Flag	Description
Gmina Filipów		The municipal flag was established by Resolution No. XIX/135/2013 of 27 February 2013. It is a rectangular flag with proportions of 5:8, divided into three vertical stripes: two black and a red one in the ratio of 1:4:1. In the central part of the flag the municipal coat of arms.
Gmina Suwałki		The flag of the municipality was established by Resolution No. VIII/61/15 of 12 June 2015. It is a rectangular flag with proportions of 5:8, green in colour, in the central part of the flag the municipal coat of arms is placed.
Gmina Szypliszki		The municipal flag was established by Resolution No. XVI/109/2012 of 15 May 2012. It is a rectangular flag with proportions of 5:8, divided into five vertical stripes: two yellow, two black and green in the ratio of 2:1:10:1:2. In the central part of the flag the municipal coat of arms is placed.
Gmina Wiżajny		The flag of the municipality was established by Resolution No. VII/41/15 of 28 May 2015. It is a rectangular flag with proportions of 5:8, red in colour, in the central part of flag the municipal coat of arms is placed.

=== Wysokie Mazowieckie County ===
Municipality	Flag	Description
City and gmina Ciechanowiec		The municipal flag was established by Resolution No. 219/XIX/08 of 25 August 2008. It is a rectangular flag with proportions of 5:8, divided into three equal horizontal stripes: two blue and a yellow one.
City and gmina Czyżew		The municipal flag, designed by Rev. Paweł Dudziński and Wojciech Tutak, was established by Resolution No. XVIII/124/12 of 3 May 2012. It is a rectangular flag with proportions of 5:8 in blue, in the centre-left part of the flag the coat of arms of the municipality is placed, and in the lower right corner there are two white diagonal stripes, referring to the history of the municipality.
Gmina Kobylin-Borzymy		The municipality's flag was established on 3 May 2005. It is a rectangular flag with proportions of 5:8, divided into three vertical stripes: two red and one white in the ratio of1:2:1. In the central part of the flag the municipality's coat of arms is placed.
Gmina Kulesze Kościelne		The municipal flag, designed by Robert Szydlik, was established by the resolution 80/XVI/2012 of 19 August 2012. It is a rectangular piece of flag 5:8 in red, in the central part of the flag the municipal coat of arms is placed.
Gmina Nowe Piekuty		The municipality's flag was established by Resolution No. XXXII/197/14 of 4 June 2014. It is a rectangular flag with proportions of 5:8, divided into three vertical parts in the ratio of 1:2:1. The two outermost ones are divided into five equal horizontal stripes: three red and two white, the central blue one contains the municipal coat of arms.
Gmina Sokoły		The municipal flag was established by Resolution No. VI/30/03 of 4 March 2003. It is a rectangular flag, divided into three vertical stripes: two narrower yellow ones and a blue one in the ratio of 1:4:1. In its central part of the flag the municipal coat of arms.
City and gmina Szepietowo		The municipal flag was established by Resolution No. XI/73/07 of 12 November 2007. It is a rectangular flag with proportions of 5:8, divided into five horizontal stripes: two blue, white, black and yellow in the ratio 2:1:2:1:2. In its central part of the flag the municipal coat of arms is placed.
City of Wysokie Mazowieckie		The city flag was established on 10 October 2002. It is a rectangular flag with proportions 5:8, divided by a white diagonal stripe running from the lower left corner to the upper right corner into two parts: the upper one is blue with the municipal coat of arms and the lower one is green.
Gmina Wysokie Mazowieckie		The municipality's flag was established by Resolution No. 238/XXVI/13 of 20 June 2013. It is a rectangular flag with proportions of 5:8, divided into three horizontal stripes: blue, silver and yellow. In its central part of the flag the municipal coat of arms is placed.

=== Zambrów County ===
Municipality	Flag	Description
Gmina Rutki		The municipality's flag, designed by Robert Szydlik, was established by Resolution No. 154/XXVIII/13 of 20 December 2013. It is a rectangular flag with proportions of 5:8, red in colour, in the central part of the flag the municipal coat of arms is placed.
Gmina Szumowo		The municipal flag, designed by Robert Szydlik, was established by Resolution No. XIX/135/2013 of 27 February 2013. It is a rectangular flag with proportions of 5:8, divided into three vertical stripes: yellow, red and blue in the ratio of 1:2:1. In the central part of the flag the municipal coat of arms is placed.
City of Zambrów		The city's flag is a rectangular flag divided into three vertical stripes: two red and one white. In the central part of the flag the coat of arms of the city is placed.
Gmina Zambrów		The municipal flag was established by Resolution No. 151/XXVII/09 of 27 July 2009. It is a rectangular flag with proportions of 5:8, divided into five equal horizontal stripes: two green, two white and black.

== Former flags ==
=== Łomża County ===
Municipality	Flag	Description
Gmina Wizna		The previous flag of the municipality is a rectangular flag,yellow in colour, in the central part of the flag was half a black bear and half a red eagle, surmounted by a single crown. This flag was probably mistakenly attributed to the Wizna Land.

== See also ==
- Flags of counties in Podlaskie Voivodeship
