= Coat of arms of Augustów Voivodeship =

Polish coat of arms

The coat of arms of Augustów Voivodeship (1816–1837), and later Augustów Governorate, used until 1844.

The coat of arms that served as a symbol of Augustów Voivodeship (1816–1837), and later Augustów Governorate (1837–1867), of Congress Poland, was divided vertically into two red fields. The left half depicted a knight in a white (silver) armor, sitting on a white (silver) horse with a blue saddle and shabrack, standing on its back hoofs. The knight has a blue shield with a yellow (golden) cross of Lorraine on it, put on his left arm, and hold a sword in his right hand. The right half depicted a black bear facing left and standing on its back legs, with a yellow (golden) collar on its neck.

== History ==
The coat of arms of the Augustów Governorate, used from 1845 to 1866.

Augustów Voivodeship of Congress Poland was established on 16 January 1816. Its coat of arms was divided vertically into two red fields. The left half depicted a knight in a white (silver) armor, sitting on a white (silver) horse with a blue saddle and shabrack, standing on its back hoofs. The knight has a blue shield with a yellow (golden) cross of Lorraine on it, put on his left arm, and hold a sword in his right hand. The right half depicted a black bear facing left and standing on its back legs, with a yellow (golden) collar on its neck. The voivodeship existed until 23 lutego 1837, when it was replaced by Augustów Governorate, which continued using said coat of arms.

The design of the coat of arms had been slightly altered, and approved by the viceroy of Poland, Ivan Paskevich, on 5 October 1845, and later, by the tsar or Russia, Nicholas I, on 26 May 1849. The alternated design still used the same charges, however the French-style Escutcheon begun being used. It remained in use until 1867, when the region had been partitioned into the governorates of the Łomża and Suwałki.

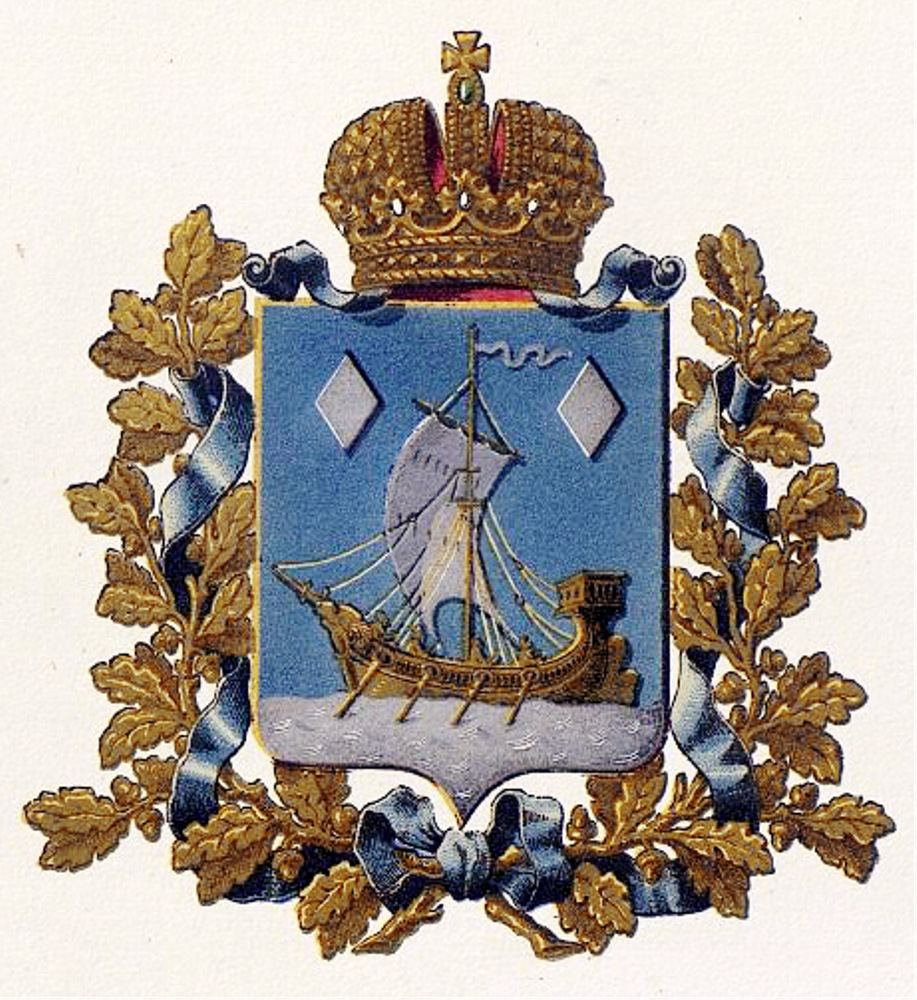
The coat of arms of the Łomża Governorate, used from 1870 to 1914.

The coat of arms of the Suwałki Governorate, used from 1870 to 1914.

The coat of arms of Łomża Governorate depicted a small orange (golden) Kaffenkahn river boat with four paddles, a white (silver) sail and a naval jack on top of the mast. On each side of the boat, on the height of the mast, was placed a grey (silver) rhombus. The boat was put on a body of water. It was placed on a blue French-style escutcheon. Around the shield, there were yellow (golden) leaves of the oak tree, interspersed with the blue ribbon of the Order of St. Andrew. On the top of the coat of arms, above the escutcheon, there was the yellow (golden) Imperial Crown of Russia. The coat of arms was used until 1912, when the governorate ceased to exist.

The coat of arms of Suwałki Governorate depicted a green spruce tree on a black hill, with two rows of a wavy blue lines placed horizontally in front of it. It was placed on a yellow (golden) French-style escutcheon. Around the shield, there were yellow (golden) leaves of the oak tree, interspersed with the blue ribbon of the Order of St. Andrew. On the top of the coat of arms, above the escutcheon, there was the yellow (golden) Imperial Crown of Russia. The coat of arms was used until 1912, when the governorate ceased to exist.

The coat of arms of the new governorates had been approved on 25 February 1869, and officially adopted on 26 February 1870. Both were used until 1914, when the governorates ceased to exist.

== See also ==
- Coat of arms of Podlaskie Voivodeship
