= List of county flags in the Podlaskie Voivodeship =

Counties (powiat) in Podlaskie Voivodeship, Poland have symbols in the form of flags.

The flag of Podlaskie Voivodeship.

A flag is a sheet of fabric of a specific shape, colour and meaning, attached to a spar or mast. It may also include the coat of arms or emblem of the administrative unit it represents. In Poland, territorial units (municipal, city, and county councils) may establish flags in accordance with the Act of 21 December 1978 on badges and uniforms. In its original version, the act only allowed territorial units to establish coats of arms. It was not until the "Act of 29 December 1998 amending certain acts in connection with the implementation of the state system reform" that the right for provinces, counties, and municipalities to establish a flag as the symbol of their territorial unit was officially confirmed. This change benefited powiats, which were reinstated in 1999.

As of 2017, all 14 counties and three cities with county rights in Podlaskie Voivodeship have their own flag. Addationally, the voivodeship itself has had a flag since 2002, shown above.

== List of current county flags ==
=== City counties ===
Powiat	Flag	Description
Białystok		The city's flag, designed by Tadeusz Gajl, was established on 27 May 1996. It is a rectangular flag with proportions of 5:8, divided into three equal horizontal stripes: white, yellow and red. In the central part of the flag the cities coat of arms is placed.
Łomża		The city flag was established by resolution no 135/XXVI/95 of 20 December 1995. It is a rectangular flag, divided into three triangles: yellow (symbolising the Mazovian sands), blue (symbolising the Narew river) and red (referring to the city walls).
Suwałki		The first version of the city's flag was established by Resolution No. VII/61/2015 of 29 April 2015, while the current one, designed by Kamil Wójcikowski and Robert Fidura, was established by Resolution No. XLIX/641/2022 of 28 September 2022. It is a rectangular flag with proportions of 5:8, divided into two horizontal stripes: green and red in the ratio of 7:1. In the central part of the flag the city's coat of arms is placed.

=== Powiaty ===
Powiat	Flag	Description
Powiat augustowski		The county flag was established by resolution 180/XXV/2001 of 2 April 2001. It is a rectangular flag with proportions of 5:8, divided into two parts by a white stripe from the bottom left corner to upper right corner: the upper one is blue, with county coat of arms, and the lower one is green.
Powiat białostocki		The county flag was established by Resolution No. XXXII/179/01 of 20 September 2001. It is a rectangular flag with proportions of 5:8, divided into two equal horizontal stripes: yellow and red. In the central part of the flag is the county coat of arms.
Powiat bielski		The county flag was established by Resolution No. XXXIII/221/10 of 27 January 2010. It is a rectangular flag with proportions of 5:8, divided into eight equal red and white stripes. In the central part of the flag is the county coat of arms.
Powiat grajewski		The county flag was established by Resolution No. XXXV/188/13 of 28 May 2013. It is a rectangular flag with proportions of 5:8, in red colour, on the left side of the flag the emblem from the county coat of arms is placed.
Powiat hajnowski		The flag of the district was established by means of Resolution No. XXXVII/193/02 of 26 June 2002. It is a rectangular flag with proportions of 5:8, divided into two horizontal stripes: yellow and green in the ratio of 2:1. In the central part of the flag is the county coat of arms.
Powiat kolneński		The county flag was established by Resolution No. XXX/170/01 of 29 March 2001. It is a rectangular flag with proportions of 5:8, divided into two equal horizontal stripes: yellow and green. In the central part of the flag is the county coat of arms.
Powiat łomżyński		The county flag was established by means of Resolution No. XXXVIII/219/06 of 28 September 2006. It is a rectangular flag with proportions of 5:8, divided into three vertical stripes: red, white and yellow in the ratio of 1:2:1. In the central part of the flag the county coat of arms is placed.
Powiat moniecki		The flag of the county, designed by Paweł Dudziński, was established by Resolution No. X/63/11 of 11 November 2011. It is a rectangular flag with proportions of 5:8, divided into two equal vertical parts: the left one is red, with the county coat of arms, and the right one is divided into seven equal horizontal stripes: four red and three yellow, symbolising the municipalities of the county.
Powiat sejneński		The county flag, designed by Aleksander Bąk, was established by Resolution No. XXXI/170/2017 of 31 May 2017. It is a rectangular flag with proportions of 5:8, divided into five vertical stripes: three red and two yellow in the ratio of 2:1:10:1:2. In the central part of the flag is the county coat of arms is placed.
Powiat siemiatycki		The poviat flag, designed by Tadeusz Gajl, was established by Resolution No. XXV/174/05 of 28 October 2005. It is a rectangular flag with proportions of 5:8, divided into four equal horizontal stripes: white, red, yellow and blue (derived from the voivodeship flag). In the central part of the flag is the county coat of arms.
Powiat sokólski		The county flag was established by means of Resolution No. XXXIV/255/05 of 25 November 2005. It is a rectangular flag with proportions of 5:8, divided into three vertical stripes: two red and one yellow in the ratio of 1:2:1. In its central part of the flag the county coat of arms is placed.
Powiat suwalski		The county flag is a flag with proportions 1:2 in the form of a red flag, surrounded by a white border. To the left of the flag is the county coat of arms.
Powiat wysokomazowiecki		The first version of the poviat flag was established by means of Resolution No. XXXII/224/02 of 5 October 2002, while the current one was established by means of Resolution No. III/16/2015 of 26 January 2015. It is a rectangular flag with proportions of 5:, red in colour, divided by a white wavy line into two parts in the ratio of 2:1. It features the poviat coat of arms.
Powiat zambrowski		The first version of the county flag was established by Resolution No. XVII/110/2000 of 26 May 2000; the current one, designed by Robert Szydlik, was established by Resolution No. XXVII/216/18 of 12 June 2018. It is a rectangular flag with proportions of 5:8 in red, in the central part of the flag the county coat of arms is placed.

== See also ==
- List of municipal flags in the Podlaskie Voivodeship
