= Alexander Pietrov =

Statesman of the Russian Empire

- Александр Петров
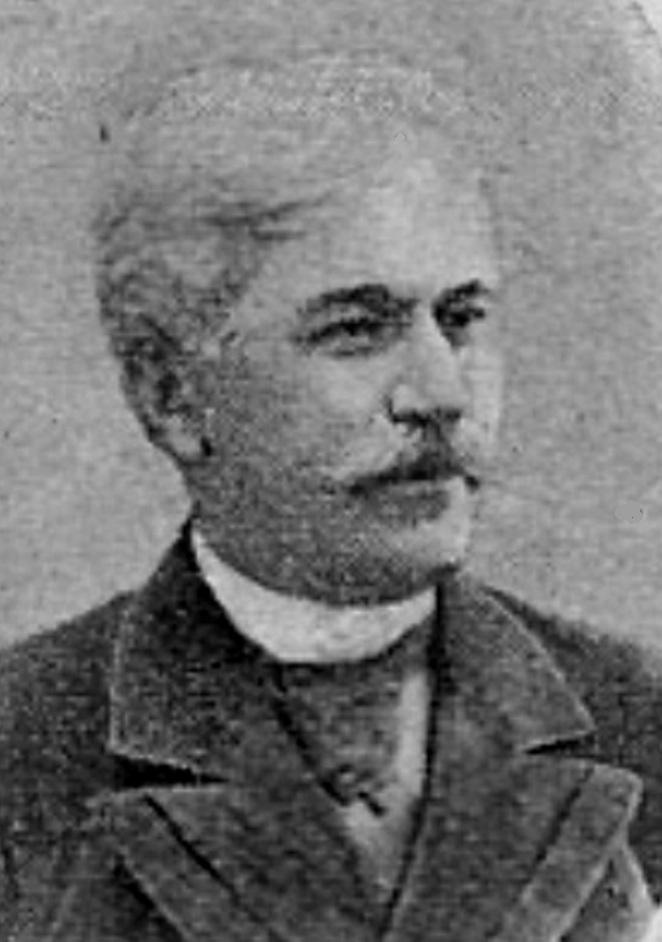

Senator in the Governing Senate
- In office 24 February [O.S. 12 February] 1897

Assistant to the Warsaw General-Governor for Administrative Affairs
- In office 5 April [O.S. 24 March] 1895 – 24 February [O.S. 12 February] 1897
- Preceded by: Nikolai Medem
- Succeeded by: Alexander Obolensky

Governor of the Kharkov Governorate
- In office 11 February [O.S. 30 January] 1886 – 5 April [O.S. 24 March] 1895
- Preceded by: Alexander von Uexküll-Güldenband
- Succeeded by: Hermann von Tobiesen

Governor of the Minsk Governorate
- In office 11 September [O.S. 30 August] 1879 – 11 February [O.S. 30 January] 1886
- Preceded by: Valery Charykov
- Succeeded by: Nikolai Trubetskoy

Deputy Governor of the Siedlce Governorate
- In office 14 August [O.S. 2 August] 1874 – 26 April [O.S. 14 April] 1878
- Preceded by: Andrei Drukart
- Succeeded by: Nikolai Ivanenko

Personal details
- Born: 28 February [O.S. 16 February] 1838 Saint Petersburg
- Died: 1 September [O.S. 19 August] 1915
- Awards: Order of Saint Alexander Nevsky, Order of the White Eagle, Order of Saint Stanislaus, Order of Saint Anna, Order of Saint Vladimir, Medal "For Relieving the Polish Rebellion", Order of Prince Danilo I, Order of Civil Merit

Alexander Ivanovich Pietrov (Russian: Алекса́ндр Ива́нович Петро́в; born 1 September [O.S. 19 August] 1915, died 1 September [O.S. 19 August] 1915) was a statesman of the Russian Empire, member of the Governing Senate, governor of Minsk Governorate and Kharkov Governorate, deputy governor of Siedlce Governorate.

== Biography ==
Alexander Ivanovich Pietrov was born on 16 February 1838. (Note: Unless otherwise noted, all dates in this article are given in the old style, that is, according to the Julian calendar.) His family hailed from the Orthodox nobility of Saratov Governorate, owning 309 dessiatins of land there, as well as 762 dessiatins in Podolia Governorate (equivalent to 337.6 and 832.5 hectares, respectively).

=== Military career ===
He graduated from the Polotsk Cadet Corps. (Note: Górak, Kozłowski & Latawiec (2015, p. 352) cite the Constantine Corps, but this corps had not yet been formed at the time.) On 6 June 1857, he began his military service as a podporuchik (XIII military rank) in the 17th Rifle Battalion, with which he continued his military career. Briefly, he served in the Model Infantry Battalion (from 22 August 1858), and between 22 November 1858 and 5 November 1859, he trained at the Officers' Rifle School, attached to its rifle company. He graduated with a first-class diploma, and during his studies, he was promoted to lieutenant (XII rank) on 15 April 1859. He spent two years on the staff of the Inspector of Rifle Battalions (from 30 March 1860 to 11 June 1862). He was then assigned to the Life Guards Rifle Battalion. On 15 January 1863, he returned to the 17th Rifle Battalion. Within this unit, he fought against the January Uprising insurgents. His battalion operated within the Vilna Military District, clashing with Poles between February 9 and December 22, 1863. During the fighting, on June 12, Pietrov demonstrated heroism near the village of Mantvidowo, for which he was awarded the Order of Saint Anna III class with swords and bow on July 29. For more than three months (from June 25 to October 6), he also served as the military commander of the 2nd district of the Šiauliai County. In 1864, he twice changed his assignment within the battalion – commanding the 3rd company from April 4 to August 11, and managing the battalion's arsenal from October 24.

=== Civil service career in Congress Poland ===
On 6 February 1864, Alexander Pietrov was assigned to the Organizing Committee in Congress Poland. He was appointed as the commissioner to the Kielce Commission for Peasant Affairs (acting from February 17, officially confirmed on September 13). In 1866, he officially left military service and started a civilian administrative career in the rank of titular counselor (IX rank). He served as the peasant commissioner in Skierniewice County (from 4 December 1868) and Włocławek County (from 13 December 1869). Petrov received successive promotions according to his length of service: collegiate assessor on 27 February 1869, court counselor on 23 May 1872, collegiate counselor on 7 August 1875, and State Councillor on 28 July 1877. Despite the relatively low VII rank of court counselor, Alexander was appointed as deputy governor (Note: The regulations allowed, under exceptional circumstances, a position corresponding to a rank up to two ranks higher than that of an official (Górak, Kozłowski & Latawiec (2015, pp. 37–38)).) of the Siedlce Governorate on 2 August 1874, a position usually reserved for the V rank, following the death of Andrei Drukart on June 5. He held this office until 14 April 1878 when Nikolai Ivanenko succeeded him. On that day, he joined the Temporary Commission for Peasant Affairs of the Governorates of Congress Poland. Pietrov was an adherent of General-Governor Iosif Gurko, advocating for strict treatment of Poles.

=== In the Russian Empire’s administrative elite ===
Pietrov achieved the rank of actual State Councillor (IV civilian rank) in April 1879. Shortly afterward, on August 30, he was appointed governor of the Minsk Governorate, a position he held until 30 January 1886 (succeeding Valery Charykov, and succeeded by Prince Nikolai Trubetskoy). While serving in Minsk, he also became an honorary justice of the peace (on 7 December 1874), and after leaving the city, he was elected an honorary citizen of Minsk on 18 December 1886. His next position was governor of the Kharkov Governorate from 1886 to 1895 (preceded by Alexander von Uexküll-Güldenband and succeeded by Hermann von Tobiesen), and from 30 August 1887 as a secret counselor (III civilian rank). At the request of Professor Alexander Brandt, he approved the construction of the Kharkov Zoo and aquarium complex. During his tenure in Minsk, on 18 June 1894, he received an equivalent III court rank – master of the court. On the day he ended his service in Kharkov, 24 March 1895, he was admitted to the Kharkov Charitable Committee for Children's Asylums as an honorary member. His next assignment brought him back to Congress Poland, where he served as the assistant to the general-governor for administering the Vistula Land (preceded by Nikolai Medem and succeeded by Alexander Obolensky). He officially held these duties until 28 April 1897. Two months before ending his service under the Warsaw general-governor, he was nominated to the Governing Senate on February 12. From October 28, he sat in its II Department. From 3 May 1902, he was also an honorary member of the committee overseeing monuments.

Alexander Pietrov died on 19 August 1915, and was buried in the Nikolayev Cemetery at the Alexander Nevsky Lavra in St. Petersburg.

== Family ==
Alexander Ivanovich Pietrov married in 1871. His wife was Alexandra Mikhailovna Zielenko, the daughter of a colonel, who died on 9 June 1916. They had one daughter, Alexandra, born on 21 December 1872, who married artillery colonel Nikolai Aleksandrovich Krutikov.

== Orders and awards ==
Aleksandr Petrov was awarded the following orders:

=== Russian orders ===
- Order of Saint Stanislaus:
  - III Class: 23 April 1861
  - II Class: 8 November 1868
  - II Class with Crown: 26 March 1871
  - I Class: 1 January 1882
- Order of Saint Anna:
  - III Class with Sword and Bow: 29 July 1863
  - II Class with Crown: 30 March 1873
  - I Class: 1 January 1885
- Order of Saint Vladimir:
  - III Class: 19 June 1875
  - II Class: 1 April 1890
- Order of the White Eagle: 1895
- Order of Saint Alexander Nevsky: 1904

=== Foreign orders ===
- Order of Prince Danilo I (Montenegro):
  - I Class: December 21, 1883
- Order of Civil Merit (Bulgaria):
  - Class: 1902

=== Medals ===
- Medal "For Relieving the Polish Rebellion": 1865
- Silver Medal for Work in Implementing the Emancipation Reform in Congress Poland: 19 February 1866
- Silver Medal Commemorating the Reign of Alexander III: 26 April 1882

Pietrov received written commendations from the emperor four times: from Alexander III on 26 April 1882, and from Nicholas II in 1897, 1900, and 1914. Throughout his service, he was also awarded additional financial bonuses: 300 rubles on 4 May 1864, 800 rubles on 23 September 1866, and 2,000 rubles on 19 December 1891. He was entitled to a 15% bonus for five years of service in Congress Poland, granted on 1 January 1873. Alexander III also granted him an annuity of 2,000 rubles annually on 30 August 1890. Initially set for six years, this annuity was extended twice, each time for an additional four-year period.

== Bibliography ==
- Górak, Artur; Kozłowski, Jan; Latawiec, Krzysztof (2015). Słownik biograficzny gubernatorów i wicegubernatorów w Królestwie Polskim (1867–1918) (in Polish). Lublin: Wydawnictwo Uniwersytetu Marii Curie-Skłodowskiej. ISBN 978-83-7784-553-0.
- Murzanov, N. A. (2011). Словарь русских сенаторов 1711–1917 гг (in Russian). Petersburg: Российская национальная библиотека. ISBN 978-5-86007-666-2.
- Samokhvalov, N. F, ed. (2003). Губернии Российской империи. История и руководители 1708–1917 (in Russian). Moscow: Объединненная редакця МВД России.
