= Kholm Governorate (Ukraine) =

Former territorial division of Ukraine

Kholm Governorate Холмська губернія
- Governorate of the Ukrainian People's Republic / Ukrainian State
- 1918–1920
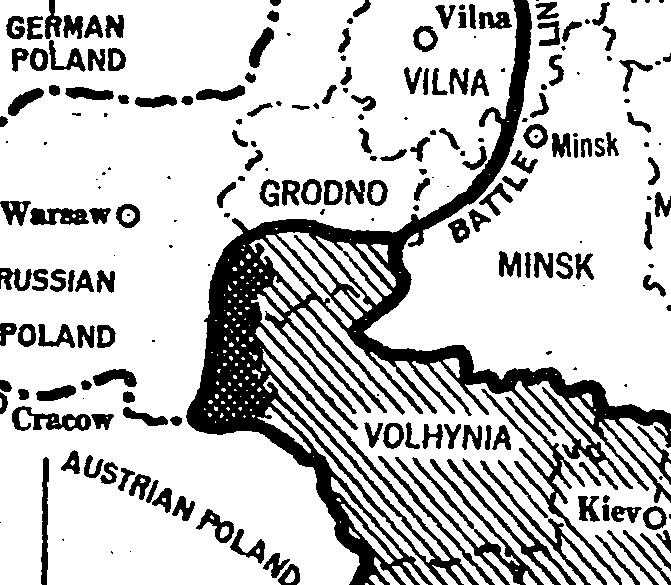
- Kholm Governorate (hatched area between Volhynia, Russian Poland and Austrian Poland).
- Capital: Kholm (de iure) Berestia (de facto)
- Area
- 10,460 km^{2} (4,040 sq mi)
- Population
- 912,000
- History
  - First Treaty of Brest-Litovsk: 9 February 1918
  - Creation of Kholm Governorate: 15 November 1918
  - Start of Polish-Ukrainian War: 17 July 1919
  - Creation of Lublin Voivodeship: 14 August 1919
  - Treaty of Warsaw: 21 April 1920
Preceded by	Succeeded by
Kholm Governorate	Lublin Voivodeship (1919–1939)

Kholm Governorate (Ukrainian: Холмська губернія, romanized: Kholmska huberniia) was an administrative-territorial unit of Ukraine that was recreated under the Skoropadsky administration in the western parts of Volyn Governorate. The governorate was created after the resignation of the Hetman of Ukraine, while the armed forces of Central Powers started a mass withdrawal from occupied territories.

Unlike the original Kholm Governorate that was created before World War I, the new territory was mostly created out of the southern parts of Grodno Governorate and eastern parts of former Siedlce Governorate.

The Ukrainian People's Republic was unable to establish its presence in the southern parts of governorate. In March 1918, Austria-Hungary suspended the enforcement of the western Ukrainian border, claiming the Chełm region was still part of the Kingdom of Poland and suggested creating a new border with the participation of Polish officials. From early December 1918, the whole governorate was occupied by the Polish Army.

== Gallery ==
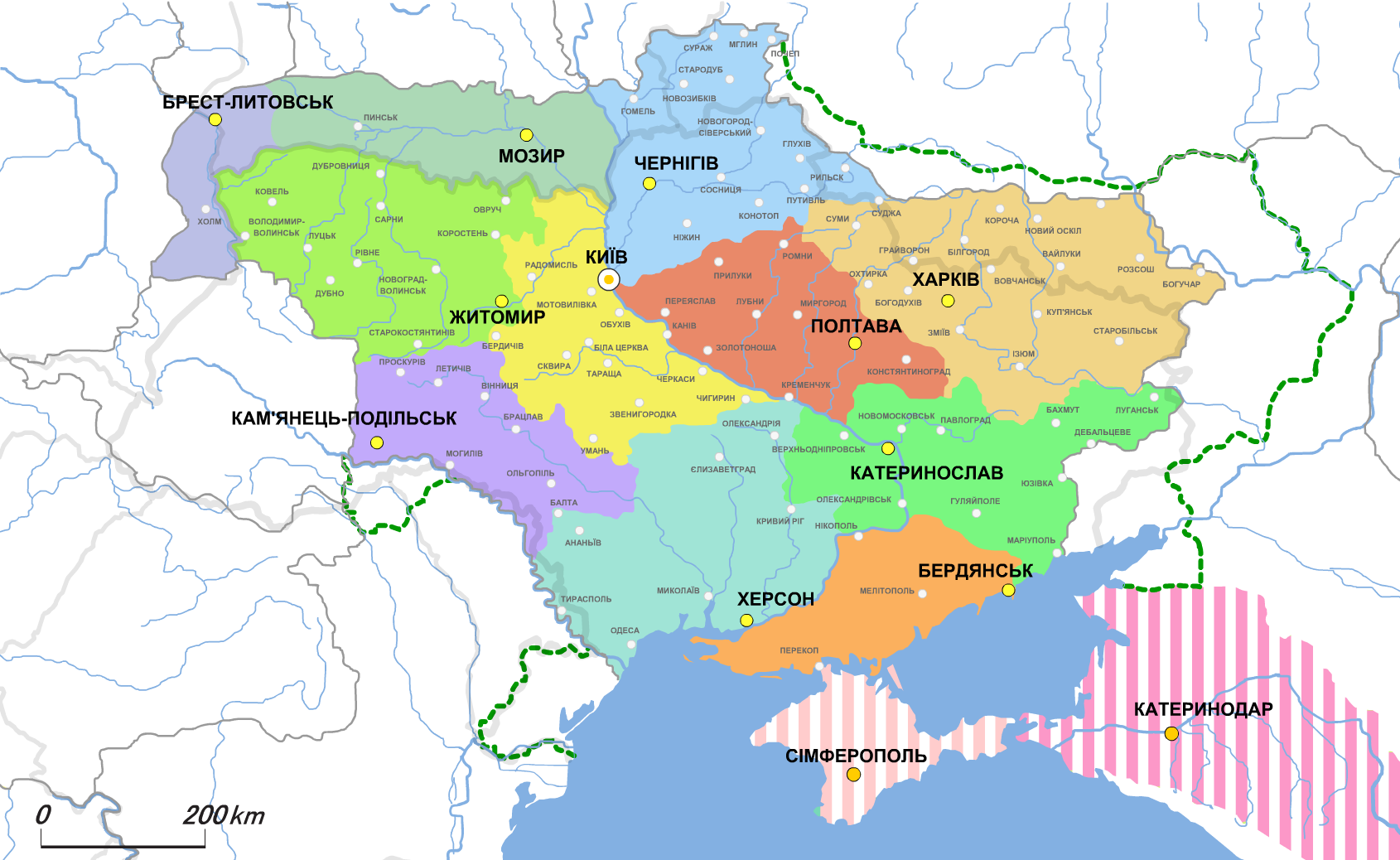
Kholm Governorate (upper left) as part of the Ukrainian State
