= Abraham Mordechai Piurko =

Hebrew writer

- אברהם מרדכי פּיורקאָ
- Born: 15 February 1853; Lomza, Augustów Governorate, Congress Poland
- Died: 11 June 1933 (aged 80); Grayeve, Bialystok Voivodeship, Second Polish Republic
- Writing career
- Language: Hebrew

Abraham Mordechai Piurko (Yiddish: אברהם מרדכי פּיורקאָ, romanized: Avraham Mordekhai Piyurko; 15 February 1853 – 11 June 1933) was a Hebrew-language author, children's writer, publisher, and educator.

== Biography ==
Title page of Haskalah medumah (1887)

Piurko was born to a Jewish family in Lomza, Poland. After having studied Talmud and rabbinics, he devoted himself to modern Hebrew literature, publishing successively: Bat Yiftaḥ (Lyck, 1873), a Biblical poem; Reʿuyim ha-devarim le-mi she-omrim (Warsaw, 1880), criticisms on Biblical and Talmudical legends; Sefer mikhtavim ha-shalem (Warsaw, 1882), a Hebrew letter-writer, containing 150 specimens of letters on different subjects; Nitʻe naʻamanim (Warsaw, 1884), 100 stories for the young; Kur ha-mivḥan (Warsaw, 1887), a book for teachers, containing a Biblical catechism; and Haskalah medumah (Warsaw, 1888), a sketch of Jewish life.

In 1893 Piurko published eleven stories for children, two of which were written by his son Ḥayyim, and in 1894 Shevet sofer ha-shalem, a new letter-writer, also containing 150 specimens. In the same year he published Yilkut ha-reʻim, a grammatical work in verse, and issued a new and revised edition of his Nitʻe naʻamanim. Elef ha-magen, a grammar for school courses, was published in 1898.

In 1899 Piurko began the publication of the weekly periodical Gan sha'ashu'im, the first Hebrew children's newspaper outside Palestine. Besides numerous articles by him, two of his works deserving special mention were published in the newspaper, namely, Av le-banim (1899) and Ha-rav ve-talmidav (1900). The latter work consists of essays on grammar. In addition, Piurko contributed to many Hebrew and Yiddish periodicals in Odessa, Saint Petersburg, and Warsaw.

== Publications ==
- Bat Yiftaḥ. Lyck: Druck von Rudolph Siebert. 1873.
- Pjurko, Abraham Marcus (1880). Reʿuyim ha-devarim le-mi she-omrim. Warsaw.
- Sefer mikhtavim ha-shalem. Warsaw: Defus Natan Shriftgisser. 1882.
- Sefer nitʻe naʻamanim. Warsaw: Druk fun Aleksander Ginz. 1883.
- Haskalah medumah: sipur me-ḥaye ʻamenu. Warsaw: Ha-almanah Levin-Epshtain u-vaneha. 1887.
- Kur ha-mivḥan. Warsaw: Druk fun Aleksander Ginz. 1887.
- Arum raʿah raʻah ve-nistar. Warsaw: Defus ha-aḥim Shuldberg. 1893.
- Aḥarit rasha. Warsaw: Defus ha-aḥim Shuldberg. 1893.
- Dam naki. Warsaw: Defus ha-aḥim Shuldberg. 1893.
- Matza isha matza tov. Warsaw: Defus ha-aḥim Shuldberg. 1893.
- Shevet sofer ha-shalem. Warsaw. 1893.
- Ud mutzal me-esh. Warsaw: Defus ha-aḥim Shuldberg. 1893.
- Ḥalom emet. Warsaw: Defus ha-aḥim Shuldberg. 1893.
- Yilkut ha-reʻim. Warsaw: Defus Halter ve-Aizenshtadt. 1894.
- Sefer luḥot ha-peʻalim ha-ḥadash. Piotrków. 1902.
- Beit sefer Ivri ha-ḥadash; o, ha-medaber bilshon amo. Warsaw: Defus ha-almanah veha-aḥim Romm. 1903.
- Elef ha-magen. Warsaw: Defus ha-almanah veha-aḥim Romm. 1904.
- Sefer luḥot ha-peʻalim ha-matkan. Grayeve: Defus Avraham Mordekhai Piyurko. 1905.
