= Płock Governorate =

1837–1915 unit of Poland

Coordinates: 52°33′00″N 19°42′00″E

Płock Governorate Плоцкая губерния Gubernia płocka
- Governorate of Congress Poland
- 1837–1915
- Coat of arms

- Location in the Russian Empire
- Capital: Plotsk
- Area
- 9,430.8 km^{2} (3,641.3 sq mi)
- Population
  - 1897: 553,633
- History
  - Established: 1837
  - Disestablished: 1915
Preceded by	Succeeded by
Płock Voivodeship	Government General of Warsaw

Płock Governorate (Note: Russian: Плоцкая губерния, romanized: Plotskaya guberniya; Polish: Gubernia Płocka) was an administrative-territorial unit (guberniya) of Congress Poland of the Russian Empire.

It was created in 1837 from the Płock Voivodship, and had the same borders and capital (Płock) as the voivodship. In 1867 territories of the Augustów Governorate and the Płock Governorate were divided into a smaller Płock Governorate, Suwałki Governorate (consisting mostly of the Augustów Governorate territories) and recreated Łomża Governorate.

The Governorate consisted of eight counties (uyezds):

- Ciechanowski
- Lipnowski
- Mławski,
- Płocki
- Płoński
- Przasnyski
- Rypiński
- Sierpecki

== Language ==
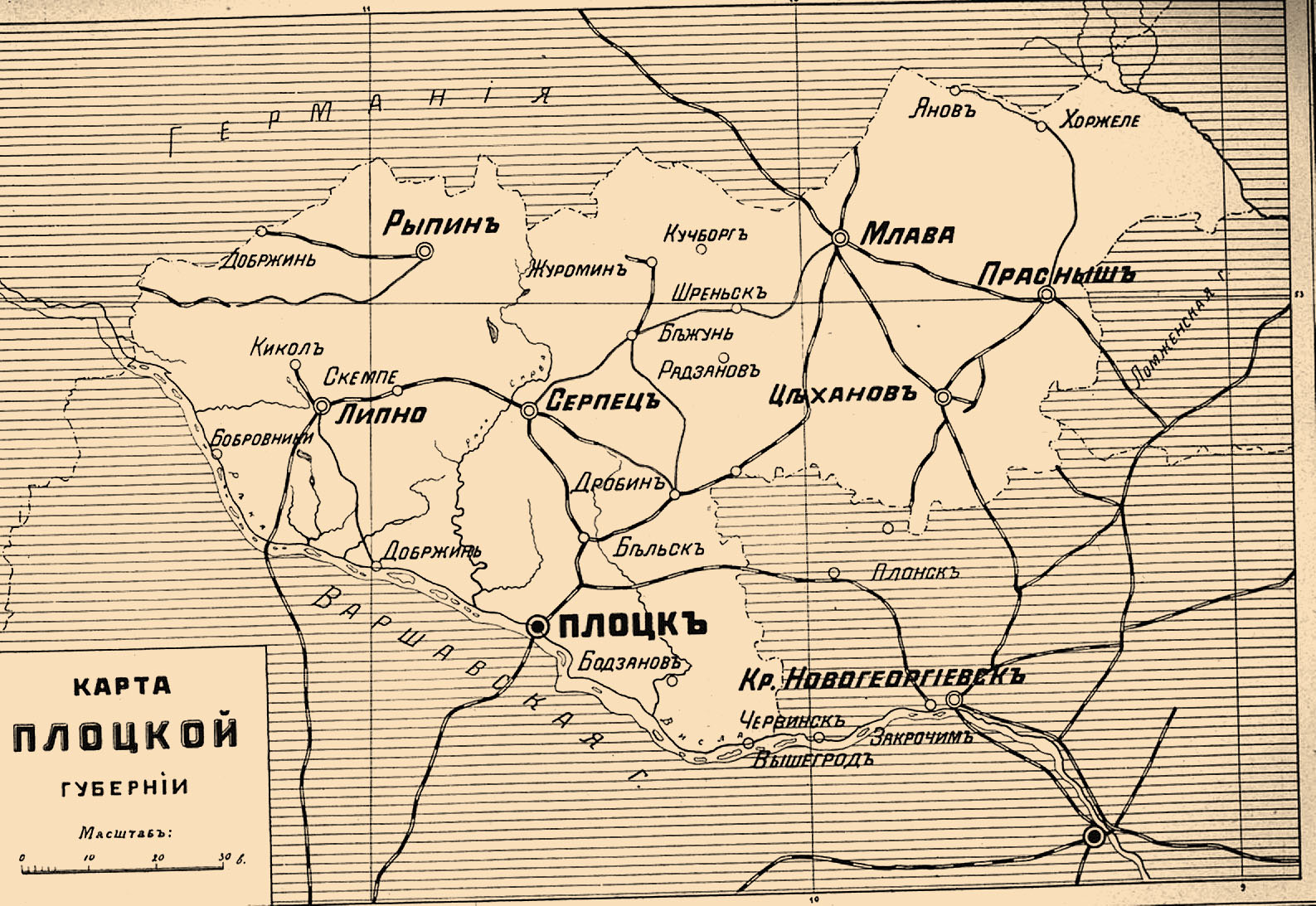
Плоцкая губерния

- By the Imperial census of 1897. In **bold** are languages spoken by more people than the state language.

Language	Number	percentage (%)	males	females
**Polish**	447 685	80.86	216 794	230 891
**Yiddish**	51 215	9.25	24 538	26 677
**German**	35 931	6.49	17 409	18 522
Russian	15 137	2.73	13 551	1 586
Ukrainian	2 350	0.42	2 302	48
Other	1 285	0.23	1 041	244
Persons that didn't name their native language	27	>0.01	14	13
Total	553 633	100	275 652	277 981
