= Flag of Podlaskie Voivodeship =

Flag of the Podlaskie Voivodeship, Poland

Podlaskie Voivodeship
- Proportion: 5:8
- Adopted: 30 August 2002
- Design: Four horizontal stripes, that are, from the top to bottom: white, red, yellow, and blue
- Designed by: Tadeusz Gajl

The flag of Podlaskie Voivodeship, Poland is a rectangle divided into four horizontal stripes, that are, from the top to bottom: white, red, yellow, and blue. It was designed by Tadeusz Gajl, and adopted on 30 August 2002.

== Design ==
The flag of Podlaskie Voivodeship is a rectangle, with an aspect ratio of height to width of 5:8, which is divided into four equal horizontal stripes, that are, from the top to bottom: white, red, yellow, and blue. The colours had been derived from the coat of arms of the voivodeship.

== History ==
The flag was designed by Tadeusz Gajl, and adopted by Podlaskie Regional Assembly on 30 August 2002, with the resolution no. LIV/448/02.

== See also ==
- Coat of arms of the Podlaskie Voivodeship
- Flags of counties in Podlaskie Voivodeship
