= Kholm Governorate (Russian Empire) =

1913–1918 unit of Russia

Kholm Governorate Холмская губерния
- Governorate of the Russian Empire
- 1913–1918
- Coat of arms

- Location in the Russian Empire
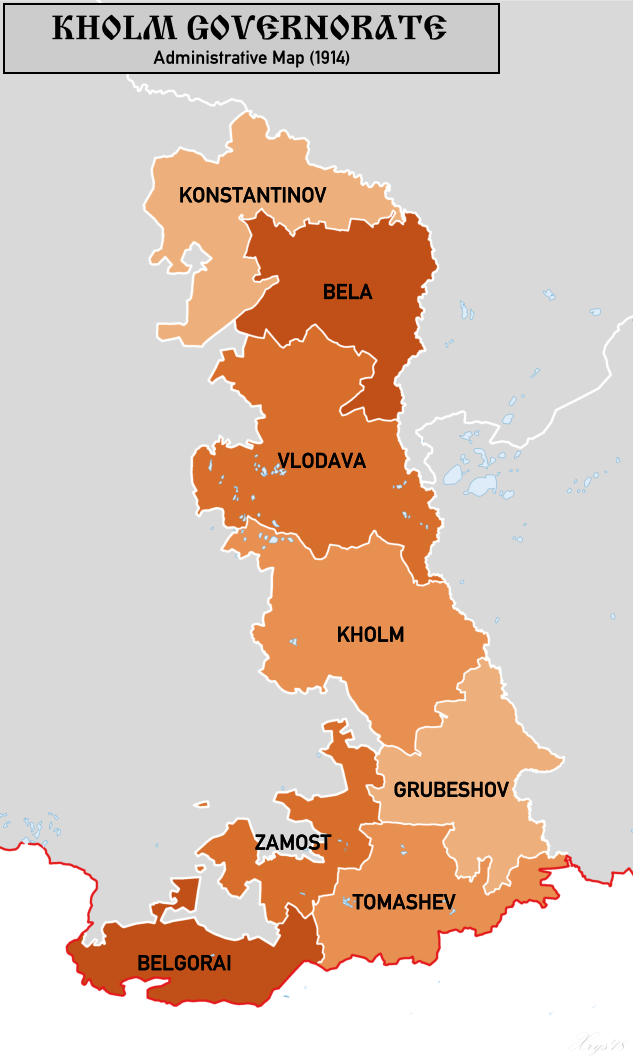
- Capital: Kholm
- Area
- 10,460 km^{2} (4,040 sq mi)
- Population
- 896,316
- History
  - Creation of Kholm Governorate: 8 September 1913
  - Act of 5th November: 1916
  - Treaty of Brest-Litovsk: 1918
  - Second Treaty of Brest-Litovsk: 1918
  - Armistice of 11 November: 11 November 1918
- Political subdivisions: Governorates of the Russian Empire
Preceded by	Succeeded by
Siedlce Governorate; Lublin Governorate	Regency Kingdom of Poland; Kholm Governorate
- Today part of: Poland

Kholm Governorate (Note: Russian: Холмская губерния, pre-1918: Холмская губернія, romanized: Kholmskaya guberniya; Ukrainian: Холмська губернія, romanized: Kholms'ka huberniia; Polish: Gubernia chełmska) was an administrative-territorial unit (guberniya) of the Russian Empire, with its capital in Kholm (Chełm).

It was created from the eastern parts of Siedlce Governorate and Lublin Governorate in 1912. It was separated from Warsaw General Governorate (but not the Kingdom of Poland) as "core Russian territory", as a precaution in case the territories of the Kingdom of Poland should be taken from the Russian Empire in an upcoming war. Another reason for this administrative change was to facilitate Russification and conversion of the non-Eastern Orthodox Christians to Orthodoxy.

Kholm Governorate was officially excluded from the Kingdom of Poland and joined to the Kiev General Governorate by the Tsar's decree of 4 April 1915.

According to Russian statistical sources for 1914, while the area of the governorate was 10,460 square kilometres (4,040 sq mi), it was inhabited by 896,316 inhabitants of whom 404,633 (45.1%) were Roman Catholics, 327,322 (36.5%) Orthodox Christians, 29,123 Protestants and 135,238 Jews. Russian data was questioned by Polish scholars, such as Włodzimierz Wakar, who argued that Poles made up a larger percent of the total population than according to official Russian sources.

However, during the Great Retreat in the summer of 1915, Russian command gave orders to evacuate the population of the governorate. Due to that policy, about 2/3 of the Ukrainian population was deported to the Russian Empire in June–July 1915. The deported population reached a few hundred thousand people and thus significantly changed the national composition of the region. As of year 1918 the ethnic Polish population amounted already to around 70% of the region's total population.

== Administrative Divisions ==
The Kholm governorate consisted of 8 Uyezds (note Russian spellings for administrative centres used):

No.	Uyezd	Admin Centre	Area, (Verst)	Population (1897) (People)
1	Belgoraisky	Belgorai (5 846 )	1 500.8	96 332
2	Belsky	Bela (13 090 )	1 311.0	76 687
3	Vlodavsky	Vlodava (6 673 )	1 900.1	98 035
4	Grubeshovsky	Grubeshov (10 639 )	1 063.9	101 392
5	Zamostsky	Zamost (14 705 )	1 569.6	119 783
6	Konstantinovsky	Yanov (3 861 )	1 263.0	61 333
7	Tomashevsky	Tomashev (6 233 )	1 213.4	98 783
8	Kholmsky	Kholm (18 452 )	1 865.9	137 585

== Demographics ==
The entire population of the Kholm province, according to official Russian statistics, was 896,316 people of whom 45.1% were Roman Catholics, 36.5% Orthodox Christians, 3.2% Protestants and 15.1% Jews. This means that even according to official data the number of Catholics was larger than the number of the Orthodox. Polish historiography considers this official Russian data as falsified. The Orthodox accounted for more than half of the population only in Grubeshovsky district, as well as in some parts of the former Lubartovsk and Krasnostavsky districts. In parts of Tomashov and Kholm districts, as well as in the former Vlodavsky Uyezd, the number of the Orthodox exceeded the number of Catholics by about 5%. In remaining areas the number of Catholics exceeded the number of the Orthodox. Due to the 1905 Decree of Tolerance (also known as The Edict of Toleration) by Tsar Nicholas II many Orthodox people in what later became the Kholm Governorate started converting to Roman Catholicism, which caused the decline of the percentage of Orthodox population in the area during the following years. The share of Orthodox Christians further declined during the evacuation of the population as part of the Great Retreat.

According to the Russian census of 1897 the share of each religion in eight uyezds which later became the Kholm Governorate was 344,098 Roman Catholics (43.6%), 314,404 Orthodox Christians (39.8%), 107,238 Jews (13.6%), 22,766 Protestants (2.9%) and 1,424 people of other religions (0.2%). According to the Polish census of 1921 the share of each religion in eight counties which used to form the Kholm Governorate before, was 494,819 Roman Catholics (65.7%), 140,549 Orthodox Christians (18.7%), 104,667 Jews (13.9%), 10,057 Protestants (1.3%) and 2,956 people of other religions (0.4%).

The total population of eight districts in 1897 was 789,930 and in 1921 it was 753,048.

Religious composition of the population according to the 1897 Russian census
Uyezd	Population 1897	Roman Catholic	%	Orthodox	%	Jewish	%	Protestant	%	Other religion	%
Konstantinovsky	61,333	34,335	56.0%	18,742	30.6%	8,185	13.3%	0	0.0%	71	0.1%
Belsky	76,687	30,340	39.6%	29,081	37.9%	16,658	21.7%	384	0.5%	224	0.3%
Vlodavsky	98,035	22,352	22.8%	55,728	56.8%	15,489	15.8%	4,391	4.5%	75	0.1%
Kholmsky	137,585	47,849	34.8%	54,485	39.6%	17,486	12.7%	17,148	12.5%	617	0.4%
Grubeshovsky	101,392	29,666	29.3%	56,058	55.3%	14,778	14.6%	843	0.8%	47	0.0%
Zamostsky	119,783	80,685	67.4%	24,224	20.2%	14,751	12.3%	0	0.0%	123	0.1%
Tomashevsky	98,783	42,944	43.5%	44,715	45.3%	10,933	11.1%	0	0.0%	191	0.2%
Belgoraisky	96,332	55,927	58.1%	31,371	32.6%	8,958	9.3%	0	0.0%	76	0.1%
Total in eight districts	789,930	344,098	43.6%	314,404	39.8%	107,238	13.6%	22,766	2.9%	1,424	0.2%

Religious composition of the population according to the 1916 Austro-Hungarian census in Military General Government of Lublin
County	Population 1916	Roman Catholic	%	Orthodox	%	Jewish	%	Protestant	%	Other religion	%
Chełm	75,947	50,150	66.0%	6,853	9.0%	17,804	23.4%	930	1.2%	120	0.2%
Hrubieszów	57,063	36,787	64.5%	5,754	10.1%	14,335	25.1%	180	0.3%	7	0.0%
Zamość	117,088	99,939	85.4%	2,377	2.0%	14,766	12.6%	6	0.0%	0	0.0%
Tomaszów	66,251	46,802	70.6%	4,116	6.2%	14,885	22.5%	93	0.1%	355	0.5%
Biłgoraj	71,761	56,986	79.4%	5,984	8.3%	8,694	12.1%	14	0.0%	83	0.1%
Total in five districts	388,110	290,664	74.9%	25,084	6.5%	70,484	18.2%	1,223	0.3%	565	0.1%

Religious composition of the population according to the 1921 Polish census
County	Population 1921	Roman Catholic	%	Orthodox	%	Jewish	%	Protestant	%	Other religion	%
Konstantynów	65,055	53,667	82.5%	4,012	6.2%	7,241	11.1%	10	0.0%	125	0.2%
Biała Podlaska	59,520	37,239	62.6%	9,551	16.0%	11,550	19.4%	226	0.4%	954	1.6%
Włodawa	76,718	40,881	53.3%	20,104	26.2%	13,562	17.7%	2017	2.6%	154	0.2%
Chełm	121,475	68,770	56.6%	24,701	20.3%	19,912	16.4%	7,476	6.2%	616	0.5%
Hrubieszów	103,841	50,735	48.9%	38,468	37.0%	13,967	13.5%	273	0.3%	398	0.4%
Zamość	142,614	119,769	84.0%	5,441	3.8%	17,225	12.1%	34	0.0%	145	0.1%
Tomaszów	92,809	57,869	62.4%	22,389	24.1%	12,154	13.1%	11	0.0%	386	0.4%
Biłgoraj	91,016	65,889	72.4%	15,883	17.5%	9,056	9.9%	10	0.0%	178	0.2%
Total in eight districts	753,048	494,819	65.7%	140,549	18.7%	104,667	13.9%	10,057	1.3%	2956	0.4%

In the 1931 census data Konstantynów county is counted as part of Biała Podlaska county:

Religious composition of the population according to the 1931 Polish census
County	Population 1931	Roman Catholic	%	Orthodox	%	Jewish	%	Protestant	%	Other religion	%
Biała Podlaska	116,266	82,647	71.1%	18,192	15.6%	14,288	12.3%	333	0.3%	806	0.7%
Włodawa	113,566	57,939	51.0%	33,382	29.4%	18,188	16.0%	3,522	3.1%	535	0.5%
Chełm	162,340	88,488	54.5%	37,530	23.1%	22,852	14.1%	10,609	6.5%	2,861	1.8%
Hrubieszów	129,957	63,365	48.8%	49,128	37.8%	15,785	12.1%	419	0.3%	1,260	1.0%
Zamość	149,548	125,249	83.8%	6,778	4.5%	16,738	11.2%	59	0.0%	724	0.5%
Tomaszów	121,124	73,021	60.3%	33,059	27.3%	14,204	11.7%	26	0.0%	814	0.7%
Biłgoraj	116,951	82,614	70.6%	20,913	17.9%	12,938	11.1%	31	0.0%	455	0.4%
Total in seven districts	909,752	573,323	63.0%	198,982	21.9%	114,993	12.6%	14,999	1.6%	7,455	0.8%

== See also ==
- Kholm Governorate (Ukraine)
