= Podlasie Governorate =

1837–1844 unit of Poland

Coordinates: 52°09′00″N 22°16′00″E

Podlasie Governorate Подлясская губерния
- Governorate of Congress Poland
- 1837–1844
- Coat of arms
- Capital: Siedlce
- History
  - Established: 1837
  - Disestablished: 1844
Preceded by	Succeeded by
Podlaskie Voivodeship	Lublin Governorate

Podlasie Governorate (Note: Russian: Подляcская губерния, romanized: Podlyasskaya guberniya; Polish: Gubernia podlaska) was an administrative-territorial unit (guberniya) of Congress Poland of the Russian Empire.

It was created in 1837 from the Podlasie Voivodeship with its capital in Siedlce. In 1844 it was merged into a larger Lublin Governorate; in 1867 it was recreated as Siedlce Governorate.
