= Lublin Governorate =

1837–1915 unit of Poland

Coordinates: 51°14′00″N 22°34′00″E

Lublin Governorate Люблинская губерния Gubernia lubelska
- Governorate of Congress Poland
- 1837–1915
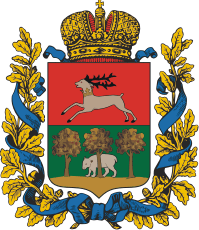
- Coat of arms

- Location in the Russian Empire
- Capital: Lyublin
- Area
- 16,831.3 km^{2} (6,498.6 sq mi)
- Population
  - 1897: 1,160,662
- History
  - Established: 1837
  - Disestablished: 1915
Preceded by	Succeeded by
Lublin Voivodeship	1912: Kholm Governorate; 1915: Government General of Warsaw

Lublin Governorate (Note: Russian: Люблинская губерния, romanized: Lyublinskaya guberniya; Polish: Gubernia Lubelska) was an administrative-territorial unit (guberniya) of Congress Poland of the Russian Empire.

== History ==
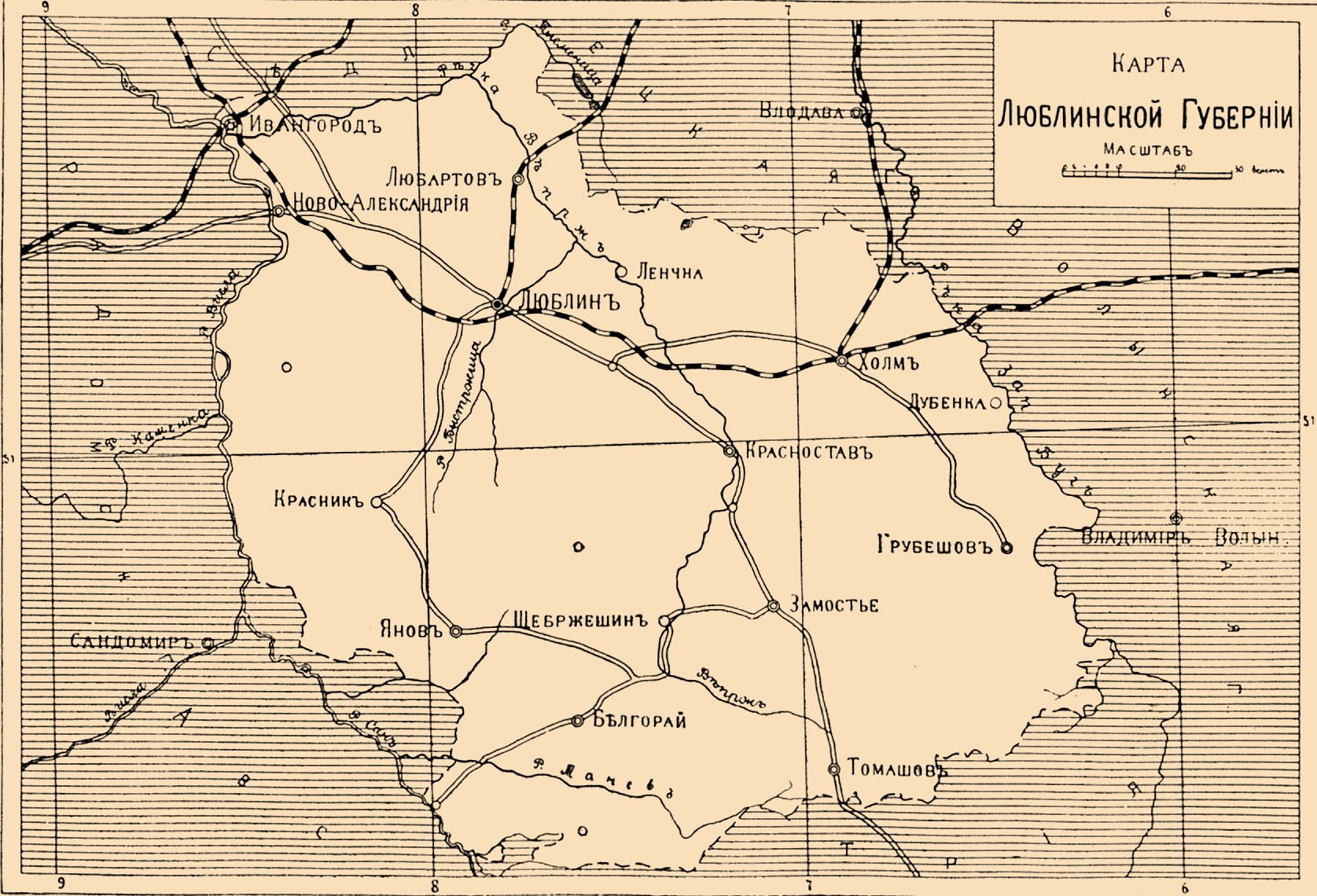

The Lublin Governorate was created in 1837 from the Lublin Voivodeship, and had the same borders and capital (Lublin) as the voivodeship.

Its lower levels of administration were also mostly unchanged, although renamed from obwóds to powiats. There were ten of those units named after their capital cities: Biłgorajski, Chełmski, Hrubieszowski, Janowski, Krasnystawski, Lubartowski, Lubelski, Puławski (from 1842: nowoaleksandryjski), Tomaszowski and Zamojski.

The Reform of 1844 merged the governorate with Podlasie Governorate, until the 1867 reform which reversed those changes (although Podlasie Governorate was renamed Siedlce Governorate). In 1912 some of the territories of the governorate were split off into the newly created Kholm Governorate.

== Language ==
- By the Imperial census of 1897. In **bold** are languages spoken by more people than the state language.

Language	Number	percentage (%)	males	females
**Polish**	729 529	62.85	360 700	368 829
**Ukrainian**	196 476	16.92	99 665	96 811
**Yiddish**	155 398	13.38	74 985	80 413
Russian	47 912	4.12	36 888	11 024
German	25 972	2.23	12 901	13 071
Estonian	2 197	0.18	2 197	0
Other	3 052	0.26	2 526	526
Persons that didn't name their native language	126	>0.01	99	27
Total	1 160 662	100	589 961	570 701
