= Shabrack =

Square saddle blanket

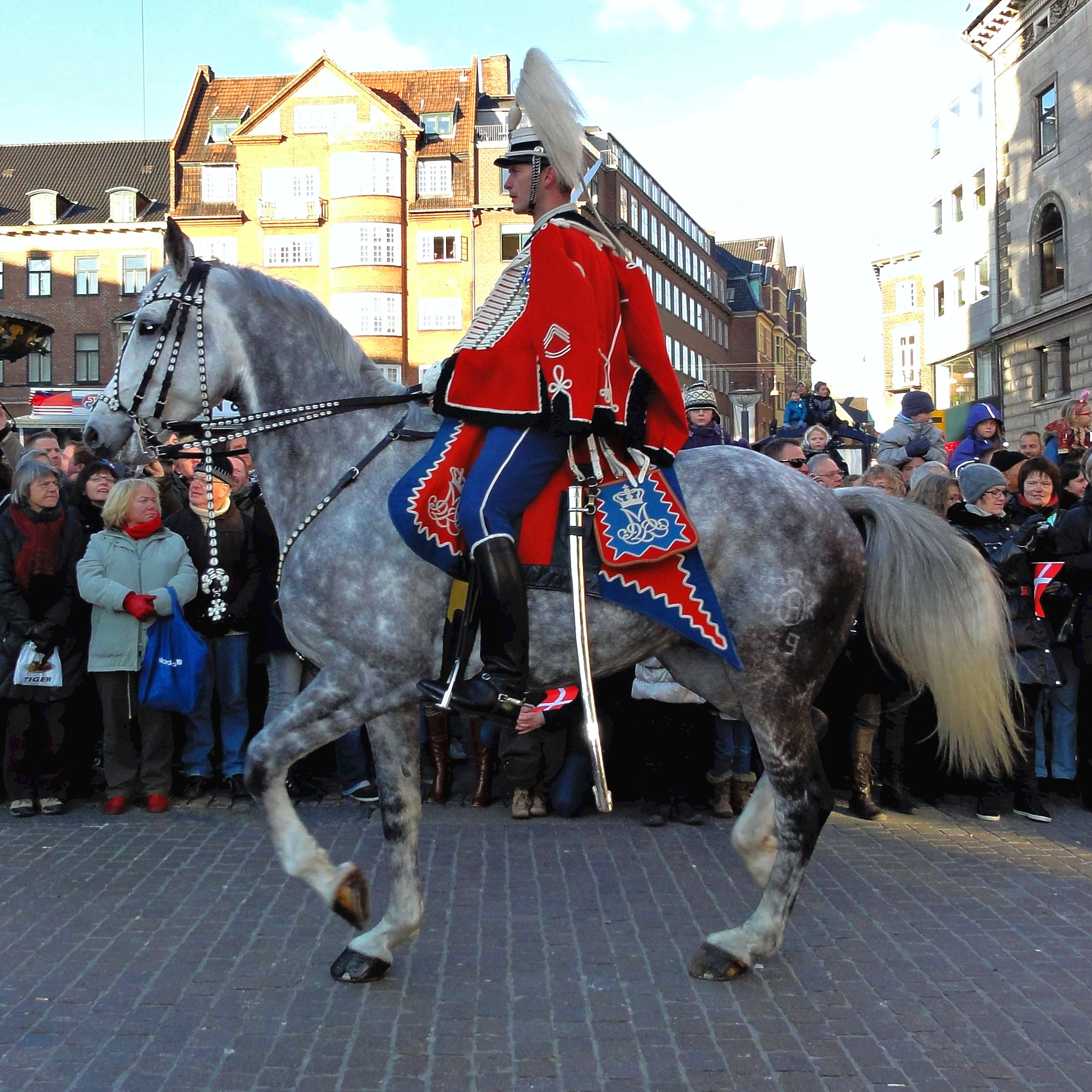
A Danish Guard Hussar with a traditional shabraque, decorated with a zig-zag border and royal cypher

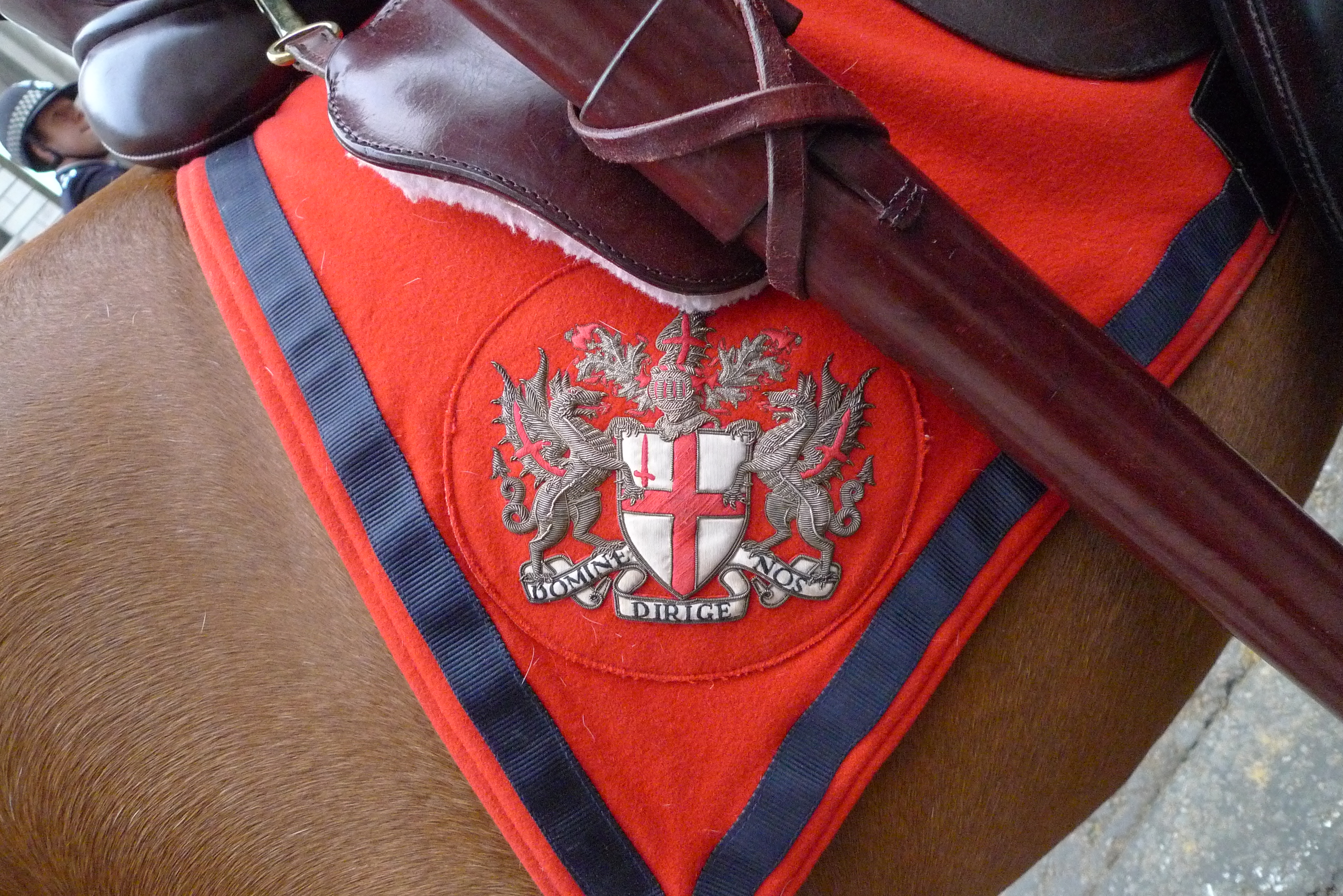
The arms of the City of London on a shabraque used on ceremonial occasions by the City of London Police

A shabrack or shabraque (Turkish: çaprak, Hungarian: csábrák) is a saddlecloth, formerly used by European light cavalry.

The shabraque was an accoutrement of the hussar cavalry, based on the Hungarian horsemen in Austrian service who were widely imitated in European armies in the 18th and 19th centuries. The shabraque was a large cloth, which in its original form covered the Hungarian-style saddle, and was itself surmounted by a sheep or goat skin. The corners of the shabraque were rounded at the front and elongated into long points at the rear. It could be elaborately decorated with a contrasting border and a royal cypher or regimental crest. It was often discarded while on active service, and by the start of the 20th century was confined to ceremonial use; in the British Army, it is used by the Household Cavalry and by General Staff officers.

== See also ==
- Caparison
