= Coat of arms of Białystok =

Official coat of arms of Białystok, Poland

Versions
- Greater Coat of arms of Białystok
- Armiger: Białystok
- Adopted: 1995
- Motto: CIVITAS BIALYSTOK

The Coat of arms of Białystok is one of the symbols of Białystok, the administrative center of Podlaskie Voivodeship located in north-eastern Poland. It was adopted on February 27, 1995, by virtue of Resolution No. XIII/76/95 of the Białystok City Council.

== History ==
Several versions of the coat of arms exist. Resolution No. X/68/67 of the Municipal National Council of February 27, 1967, the Municipal National Council in Białystok officially adopted the 1809 version of the Białystok District coat of arms as the city's coat of arms. The coat of arms was modified via Resolution No. XIII/76/95 of the City Council in Białystok on February 27, 1995.
