= Augustów Governorate =

1837–1867 unit of Poland

Augustów Governorate Августовская губерния
- Governorate of Congress Poland
- 1837–1867
- Coat of arms
- Capital: Suwałki
- Area
  - Coordinates: 53°10′N 22°5′E
- History
  - Established: 1837
  - Disestablished: 1867
Preceded by	Succeeded by
Augustów Voivodeship	Łomża Governorate; Suwałki Governorate
- Today part of: Poland; Lithuania; Belarus^{1}
- ^{1} Sopoćkinie area

Augustów Governorate (Note: Russian: Августовская губерния, romanized: Avgustovskaya guberniya; Polish: Gubernia augustowska; Lithuanian: Augustavo gubernija) was an administrative-territorial unit (guberniya) of Congress Poland of the Russian Empire.

It was created in 1837 from the Augustów Voivodship, and had the same borders and capital (Suwałki) as the voivodship. In 1867 territories of the Augustów Governorate and the Płock Governorate were divided into a smaller Płock Governorate, Suwałki Governorate (consisting mostly of the Augustów Governorate territories) and recreated Łomża Governorate.

== Administrative divisions ==
It was divided into 7 powiats:

- Biebrzańsk County (seat in Szczuczyn)
- Dąbrowski County (seat in Lipsk, later in Augustów)
- Kalvarija County
- Łomża County
- Marijampolė County
- Tykociń County
- Wigierski-Sejny County (seat in Sejny)

After 1918, the southern one-third of the governorate was included in Poland, the rest falling to Lithuania.
