= Siedlce Governorate =

1867–1912 unit of Poland

Coordinates: 52°09′00″N 22°16′00″E

Siedlce Governorate Седлецкая губерния Gubernia siedlecka
- Governorate of Congress Poland
- 1867–1912
- Coat of arms

- Location in the Russian Empire
- Capital: Sedlets
- Area
- 14,317.7 km^{2} (5,528.1 sq mi)
- Population
  - 1897: 772,146
- History
  - Established: 1867
  - Disestablished: 1912
Preceded by	Succeeded by
1867: Lublin Governorate	1912: Kholm Governorate; Lublin Governorate

Siedlce Governorate (Note: Russian: Седлецкая губерния, pre-1918: Сѣдлецкая губернія, romanized: Sedletskaya guberniya; Polish: Gubernia siedlecka) was an administrative-territorial unit (guberniya) of Congress Poland of the Russian Empire.

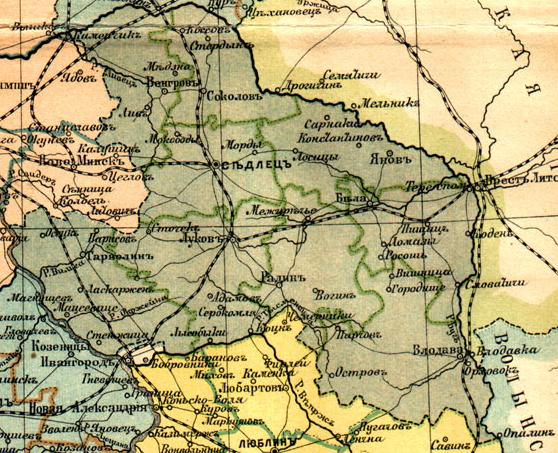
Siedlce Governorate map in 1896

== History ==
It was created in 1867 from the division of the Lublin Governorate. It was in fact a recreation of the older Podlasie Governorate, but now renamed to Siedlce Governorate. Siedlce Governorate was abolished in 1912 and its territory was divided between Lublin Governorate, Łomża Governorate and the newly created Kholm Governorate.

== Language ==
- By the Imperial census of 1897. In **bold** are languages spoken by more people than the state language.

Language	Number	percentage (%)	males	females
**Polish**	510 621	66.13	253 571	257 050
**Yiddish**	120 152	15.56	57 821	62 331
**Ukrainian**	107 785	13.95	54 219	53 566
Russian	19 613	2.54	14 856	4 757
German	11 645	1.5	5 911	5 734
Other	2 286	0.29	2 067	219
Persons that didn't name their native language	44	>0.01	21	23
Total	772 146	100	388 466	383 680

== See also ==
- Geographical Dictionary of the Kingdom of Poland
