= Łomża Governorate =

1867–1914 unit of Poland

Łomża Governorate Ломжинская губерния Gubernia łomżyńska
- Governorate of Congress Poland
- 1867–1914
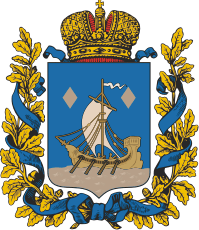
- Coat of arms

- Location in the Russian Empire
- Capital: Lomzha
- Area
  - Coordinates: 53°10′N 22°5′E
- 10,545.2 km^{2} (4,071.5 sq mi)
- Population
  - 1897: 579,592
- History
  - Established: 1867
  - Disestablished: 1914
Preceded by	Succeeded by
Augustów Governorate; Płock Governorate	Bialystok-Grodno District

Łomża Governorate (Note: Russian: Ломжинская губерния, pre-1918: Ломжинская губернія, romanized: Lomzhinskaya guberniya; Polish: Gubernia łomżyńska) was an administrative-territorial unit (guberniya) of Congress Poland of the Russian Empire, with its capital in Łomża.

== History ==
In 1867 territories of the Augustów Governorate and the Płock Governorate were divided into a smaller Płock Governorate, Suwałki Governorate (consisting mostly of the Augustów Governorate territories) and a recreated Łomża Governorate.

In 1893, a small amount of territory was transferred from the Łomża Governorate to the Warsaw Governorate.

== Governors ==
- 1893–95 Reinhold Roman von Essen (1836–95)

== Administrative divisions ==
It was divided into seven counties:

County	County Seat	Major Towns
Kolneński County	Kolno	Jedwabno • Stawiski
Łomża County	Łomża	Nowogród • Śniadowo • Wizna • Zambrów
Maków County	Maków	Krasnosielc • Różan
Wysokie Mazowieckie County	Mazowieck	Ciechanowiec • Sokoły • Tykocin
Ostrołęka County	Ostrołęka	Myszyniec
Ostrów County	Ostrów	Andrzejewo • Brok • Czyżew • Nur
Szczuczyn County	Szczuczyn	Grajewo • Radziłów • Rajgród • Wąsosz

== Language ==
- By the Imperial census of 1897. In **bold** are languages spoken by more people than the state language.

Language	Number	percentage (%)	males	females
**Polish**	448,065	77.3	220,787	227,278
**Yiddish**	91,236	15.74	44,669	46,567
Russian	27,941	4.82	25,233	2,708
German	4,651	0.8	2,387	2,264
Ukrainian	3,832	0.66	3750	82
Latvian	2,509	0.43	2,502	7
Other	1,336	0.23	1,137	199
Persons that didn't name their native language	14	>0.01	7	7
Total	579,592	100	300,487	279,105
