= Tadeusz Gajl =

Lithuanian and Polish artist (born 1940)

- Born: April 27, 1940 (age 86); Vilnius, Republic of Lithuania
- Education: The State Higher School of Fine Arts
- Website: gajl.wielcy.pl

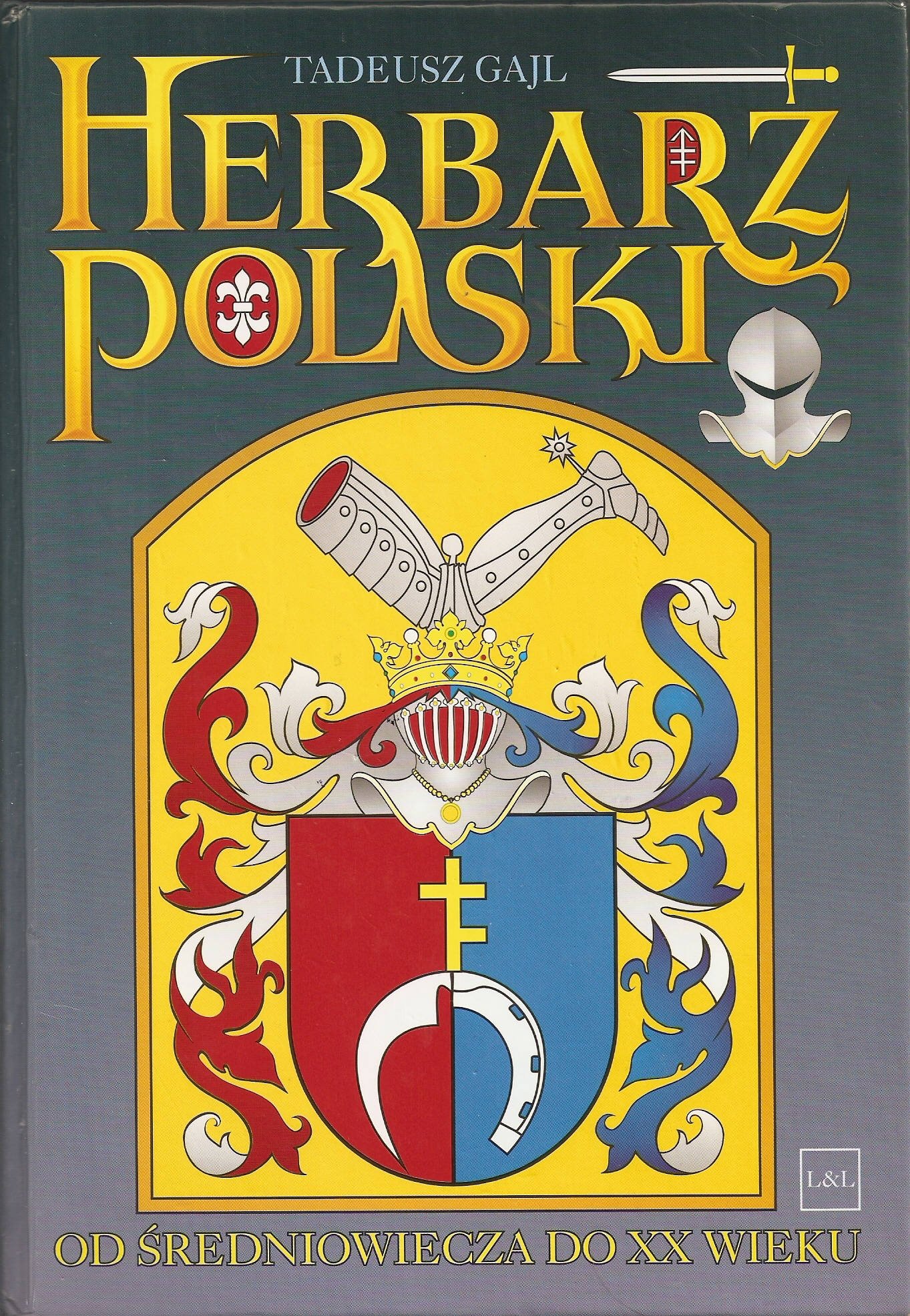
Front page of Herbarz Polski od Średniowiecza do XX wieku (transl. Polish Armorial from the Middle Ages to the 20th century), Gdańsk 2007, by Gajl

Tadeusz Gajl (born 27 April 1940 in Vilnius, Lithuania) is a Lithuanian-born Polish artist and graphic designer, notable for his contemporary illustrations on the coats of arms borne by the historical nobility (szlachta) of Poland.

After graduating from The State Higher School of Fine Arts in Łódź in 1966, he worked as a design specialist for the textile industry in Walim (1965-1966) and in Białystok (1966-1974). Between 1975 and martial law in Poland of 1981 he worked as head of graphics for the Kontrasty monthly, editor-in-chief and graphics for the weekly Plus (1989-1990). In 1990, he was also one of the co-founders of Tygodnik Białostocki, a Białystok-based local weekly. He has also authored the graphical and artistic finish of numerous books of various Polish publishing houses.

From 1983, Gajl became interested in Polish heraldry. For two of his books detailing the coats of arms of the nobility in the former Polish–Lithuanian Commonwealth he prepared more than 4,500 illustrations. He is also the author of modern emblems adopted by, among others, the city of Białystok and Podlaskie Voivodship.

== See also ==
- Polish heraldry
